= 1938 Iowa Senate election =

- November 8, 1938

22 out of 50 seats in the Iowa State Senate 26 seats needed for a majority
	Majority party	Minority party
Party	Republican	Democratic
Last election	28	22
Seats before	29 (Note: Democratic Senator Timothy Francis "T. F." Driscoll of District 1 died in early 1937. In the subsequent special election, Republican Stanley Lawrence Hart flipped the first district to his party.)	21
Seats after	38	12
Seat change	▲9	▼9
- Results; Republican gain Democratic hold Republican hold

The 1938 Iowa State Senate elections took place as part of the biennial 1938 United States elections. Iowa voters elected state senators in 22 of the state senate's 50 districts. State senators serve four-year terms in the Iowa State Senate.

A statewide map of the 50 state Senate districts in the 1938 elections is provided by the Iowa General Assembly here.

The primary election on June 6, 1938, determined which candidates appeared on the November 8, 1938 general election ballot.

Following the previous election, Republicans had control of the Iowa state Senate with 28 seats to Democrats' 22 seats. Following a special election in 1937 in district 1, Republicans flipped the first district to their party. Therefore, on election day in November 1938, Republicans held 29 seats to Democrats' 21.

To claim control of the chamber from Republicans, the Democrats needed to net 5 Senate seats.

Republicans maintained control of the Iowa State Senate following the 1938 general election with the balance of power shifting to Republicans holding 38 seats and Democrats having 12 seats (a net gain of 9 seats for Republicans).

== Summary of Results ==
- Note: The 28 holdover Senators not up for re-election are not listed on this table.

State Senate District	Incumbent	Party	Elected Senator	Party
1st	Stanley Lawrence Hart	Rep	Stanley Lawrence Hart	Rep
7th	Paul Lambert Millhone	Rep	Carl Oscar Sjulin	Rep
9th	James M. Bell	Dem	Frederick P. Cromwell	Rep
10th	Arthur Claire Dewey	Rep	Arthur Claire Dewey	Rep
12th	Eugene Irving Mason	Dem	John Edwin Talbott	Rep
13th	Roy E. Stevens	Dem	Elmer K. Bekman	Rep
18th	Frank Pelzer	Rep	Frank Pelzer	Rep
20th	Elmer Primer Corwin	Rep	Elmer Primer Corwin	Rep
21st	David W. Kimberly	Rep	Frank D. Martin	Rep
22nd	Harold L. Irwin	Dem	Otto H. Henningsen	Rep
29th	John W. Billingsley	Rep	Ross Rutledge Mowry	Rep
30th	James J. Gillespie	Dem	George M. Faul	Rep
32nd	Tom Ellis Murray	Dem	Linus Forsling	Rep
34th	Andrew Bell	Dem	Robert W. Harvey	Rep
35th	Howard C. Baldwin	Dem	Howard C. Baldwin	Dem
37th	George Raymond Hill	Rep	George Raymond Hill	Rep
38th	John Peter Berg	Rep	John Peter Berg	Rep
42nd	Samuel D. Goetsch (Note: Senator Goetsch switched parties and ran for re-election as a Republican. He lost in the general election to Democrat Ed Vrba.)	Dem	Edward Henry Vrba	Dem
44th	Edward P. Donohue	Rep	Edward P. Donohue	Rep
45th	Henry Julius Grunewald	Dem	Richard V. Leo	Rep
48th	I. G. Chrystal	Dem	Ralph E. Benson	Rep
50th	Albert Josiah Shaw	Rep	Albert Josiah Shaw	Rep

== Detailed Results ==
- NOTE: The 28 districts that did not hold elections in 1938 are not listed here.
- Note: If a district does not list a primary, then that district did not have a competitive primary (i.e., there may have only been one candidate file for that district).

=== District 1 ===
Iowa Senate, District 1 General Election, 1938
Party	Candidate	Votes	%
Republican	Stanley L. Hart (incumbent)	7,819	58.9
Democratic	J. O. Boyd	5,455	41.1
Total votes		13,274	100.0
Republican hold			

=== District 7 ===
Iowa Senate, District 7 General Election, 1938
Party	Candidate	Votes	%
Republican	Carl O. Sjulin	8,891	64.7
Democratic	Harold J. Teachout	4,841	35.3
Total votes		13,732	100.0
Republican hold			

=== District 9 ===
Iowa Senate, District 9 General Election, 1938
Party	Candidate	Votes	%
Republican	Fred Cromwell	6,830	63.5
Democratic	James M. Bell (incumbent)	3,919	36.5
Total votes		10,749	100.0
Republican gain from Democratic			

=== District 10 ===
Iowa Senate, District 10 General Election, 1938
Party	Candidate	Votes	%
Republican	A. Claire Dewey (incumbent)	7,930	66.4
Democratic	William Griffin	4,008	33.6
Total votes		11,938	100.0
Republican hold			

=== District 12 ===
Iowa Senate, District 12 Democratic Primary Election, 1938
Party	Candidate	Votes	%
Democratic	E. I. Mason (incumbent)	1,058	61.3
Democratic	Adkins	668	38.7
Total votes		1,726	100.0

Iowa Senate, District 12 General Election, 1938
Party	Candidate	Votes	%
Republican	John E. Talbott	7,616	58.1
Democratic	E. I. Mason (incumbent)	5,439	41.6
Farmer–Labor	Arthur VanZanty	43	0.3
Total votes		13,098	100.0
Republican gain from Democratic			

=== District 13 ===
Iowa Senate, District 13 General Election, 1938
Party	Candidate	Votes	%
Republican	E. K. Bekman	6,700	51.1
Democratic	Chester L. Johns	6,354	48.5
Farmer–Labor	D. W. Matheny	49	0.4
Total votes		13,103	100.0
Republican gain from Democratic			

=== District 18 ===
Iowa Senate, District 18 Republican Primary Election, 1938
Party	Candidate	Votes	%
Republican	Frank Pelzer (incumbent)	2,679	64.4
Republican	Hulsehus	1,482	35.6
Total votes		4,161	100.0

Iowa Senate, District 18 General Election, 1938
Party	Candidate	Votes	%
Republican	Frank Pelzer (incumbent)	7,466	52.5
Democratic	Walter Gregersen	6,747	47.5
Total votes		14,213	100.0
Republican hold			

=== District 20 ===
Iowa Senate, District 20 Republican Primary Election, 1938
Party	Candidate	Votes	%
Republican	E. P. Corwin (incumbent)	3,337	70.9
Republican	Hudler	1,367	29.1
Total votes		4,704	100.0

Iowa Senate, District 20 General Election, 1938
Party	Candidate	Votes	%
Republican	E. P. Corwin (incumbent)	8,222	65.0
Democratic	Henry Wildasin	4,420	35.0
Total votes		12,642	100.0
Republican hold			

=== District 21 ===
Iowa Senate, District 21 General Election, 1938
Party	Candidate	Votes	%
Republican	Frank D. Martin	11,795	51.1
Democratic	Nic LeGrand	11,293	48.9
Total votes		23,088	100.0
Republican hold			

=== District 22 ===
Iowa Senate, District 22 Republican Primary Election, 1938
Party	Candidate	Votes	%
Republican	O. H. Henningsen	2,862	57.6
Republican	Long	2,104	42.4
Total votes		4,966	100.0

Iowa Senate, District 22 General Election, 1938
Party	Candidate	Votes	%
Republican	O. H. Henningsen	9,526	53.9
Democratic	H. L. Irwin (incumbent)	8,146	46.1
Total votes		17,672	100.0
Republican gain from Democratic			

=== District 29 ===
Iowa Senate, District 29 Republican Primary Election, 1938
Party	Candidate	Votes	%
Republican	Ross R. Mowry	1,218	41.2
Republican	Decker	780	26.4
Republican	Baker	523	17.7
Republican	Hagen	434	14.7
Total votes		2,955	100.0

Iowa Senate, District 29 Democratic Primary Election, 1938
Party	Candidate	Votes	%
Democratic	J. E. Craven	855	35.6
Democratic	Hall	641	26.7
Democratic	Morgan	625	26.0
Democratic	Rigdon	280	11.7
Total votes		2,401	100.0

Iowa Senate, District 29 General Election, 1938
Party	Candidate	Votes	%
Republican	Ross R. Mowry	5,215	51.5
Democratic	J. E. Craven	4,910	48.5
Total votes		10,125	100.0
Republican hold			

=== District 30 ===
Iowa Senate, District 30 Republican Primary Election, 1938
Party	Candidate	Votes	%
Republican	George M. Faul (incumbent)	7,176	39.7
Republican	Brown	6,063	33.6
Republican	Miller	4,820	26.7
Total votes		18,059	100.0

Iowa Senate, District 30 General Election, 1938
Party	Candidate	Votes	%
Republican	George M. Faul	30,324	57.7
Democratic	James J. Gillespie (incumbent)	21,788	41.6
Farmer–Labor	Guy O. McElrea	272	0.5
Prohibition	Henry McCraven	126	0.2
Total votes		52,510	100.0
Republican gain from Democratic			

=== District 32 ===
Iowa Senate, District 32 Republican Primary Election, 1938
Party	Candidate	Votes	%
Republican	L. B. Forsling	5,378	79.7
Republican	Brand	1,368	20.3
Total votes		6,746	100.0

Iowa Senate, District 32 Democratic Primary Election, 1938
Party	Candidate	Votes	%
Democratic	P. H. McGrath	2,598	56.1
Democratic	Waller	2,033	43.9
Total votes		4,631	100.0

Iowa Senate, District 32 General Election, 1938
Party	Candidate	Votes	%
Republican	L. B. Forsling	16,576	57.2
Democratic	P. H. McGrath	11,923	41.2
Farmer–Labor	Earl Crowl	473	1.6
Total votes		28,972	100.0
Republican gain from Democratic			

=== District 34 ===
Iowa Senate, District 34 Republican Primary Election, 1938
Party	Candidate	Votes	%
Republican	Robert W. Harvey	3,073	64.9
Republican	Harshbarger	1,659	35.1
Total votes		4,732	100.0

Iowa Senate, District 34 General Election, 1938
Party	Candidate	Votes	%
Republican	Robert W. Harvey	11,600	51.7
Democratic	Andrew Bell (incumbent)	10,826	48.3
Total votes		22,426	100.0
Republican gain from Democratic			

=== District 35 ===
Iowa Senate, District 35 Democratic Primary Election, 1938
Party	Candidate	Votes	%
Democratic	Howard C. Baldwin (incumbent)	6,761	53.6
Democratic	Rhomberg	5,849	46.4
Total votes		12,610	100.0

Iowa Senate, District 35 General Election, 1938
Party	Candidate	Votes	%
Democratic	Howard C. Baldwin (incumbent)	12,122	100.0
Total votes		12,122	100.0
Democratic hold			

=== District 37 ===
Iowa Senate, District 37 Democratic Primary Election, 1938
Party	Candidate	Votes	%
Democratic	Dewey Gilbert	1,452	69.9
Democratic	Schmedeke	625	30.1
Total votes		2,077	100.0

Iowa Senate, District 37 General Election, 1938
Party	Candidate	Votes	%
Republican	G. R. Hill (incumbent)	10,290	57.1
Democratic	Dewey Gilbert	7,718	42.9
Total votes		18,008	100.0
Republican hold			

=== District 38 ===
Iowa Senate, District 38 General Election, 1938
Party	Candidate	Votes	%
Republican	John P. Berg (incumbent)	14,670	59.5
Democratic	J. E. Cundy	9,858	40.0
Farmer–Labor	Vance J. Price	116	0.5
Total votes		24,644	100.0
Republican hold			

=== District 42 ===
Iowa Senate, District 42 Republican Primary Election, 1938
Party	Candidate	Votes	%
Republican	Sam D. Goetsch (incumbent)	2,103	56.5
Republican	Miller	1,622	43.5
Total votes		3,725	100.0

Iowa Senate, District 42 General Election, 1938
Party	Candidate	Votes	%
Democratic	Edward H. Vrba	7,905	52.4
Republican	Sam D. Goetsch (incumbent)	7,180	47.6
Total votes		15,085	100.0
Democratic hold			

=== District 44 ===
Iowa Senate, District 44 Republican Primary Election, 1938
Party	Candidate	Votes	%
Republican	E. P. Donohue (incumbent)	2,793	55.2
Republican	Hill	2,267	44.8
Total votes		5,060	100.0

Iowa Senate, District 44 General Election, 1938
Party	Candidate	Votes	%
Republican	E. P. Donohue (incumbent)	7,719	100.0
Total votes		7,719	100.0
Republican hold			

=== District 45 ===
Iowa Senate, District 45 General Election, 1938
Party	Candidate	Votes	%
Republican	Richard V. Leo	8,322	54.3
Democratic	Henry J. Grunewald (incumbent)	7,016	45.7
Total votes		15,338	100.0
Republican gain from Democratic			

=== District 48 ===
Iowa Senate, District 48 General Election, 1938
Party	Candidate	Votes	%
Republican	Ralph E. Benson	10,304	58.9
Democratic	E. L. Zitzlsperger	7,180	41.1
Total votes		17,484	100.0
Republican gain from Democratic			

=== District 50 ===
Iowa Senate, District 50 General Election, 1938
Party	Candidate	Votes	%
Republican	Albert J. Shaw (incumbent)	8,723	64.1
Democratic	R. V. Neville	4,890	35.9
Total votes		13,613	100.0
Republican hold			

== See also ==
- United States elections, 1938
- United States House of Representatives elections in Iowa, 1938
- Elections in Iowa
