= 1942 Iowa Senate election =

- November 3, 1942

23 out of 50 seats in the Iowa State Senate 26 seats needed for a majority
	Majority party	Minority party
Party	Republican	Democratic
Last election	45	5
Seats after	45	5
Seat change	Steady	Steady
- Results; Democratic hold Republican hold

The 1942 Iowa State Senate elections took place as part of the biennial 1942 United States elections. Iowa voters elected state senators in 23 of the state senate's 50 districts. State senators serve four-year terms in the Iowa State Senate.

A statewide map of the 50 state Senate districts in the 1942 elections is provided by the Iowa General Assembly here.

The primary election on June 1, 1942, determined which candidates appeared on the November 3, 1942 general election ballot.

Following the previous election, Republicans had control of the Iowa state Senate with 45 seats to Democrats' 5 seats.

To claim control of the chamber from Republicans, the Democrats needed to net 21 Senate seats.

Republicans maintained control of the Iowa State Senate following the 1942 general election with the balance of power remaining unchanged with Republicans holding 45 seats and Democrats having 5 seats.

== Summary of Results ==
- Note: The 27 holdover Senators not up for re-election are not listed on this table.

State Senate District	Incumbent	Party	Elected Senator	Party
1st	Stanley Lawrence Hart	Rep	Stanley Lawrence Hart	Rep
7th	Carl Oscar Sjulin	Rep	Carl Oscar Sjulin	Rep
9th	Frederick P. Cromwell	Rep	Frederick P. Cromwell	Rep
10th	Arthur Claire Dewey	Rep	Harlan C. Foster	Rep
12th	John Edwin Talbott	Rep	Luke Vittetoe	Rep
13th	Elmer K. Bekman	Rep	Elmer K. Bekman	Rep
18th	Frank Pelzer	Rep	Frank Pelzer	Rep
20th	Elmer Primer Corwin	Rep	Floyd J. Pine	Rep
21st	Frank D. Martin	Rep	Frank D. Martin	Rep
22nd	Otto H. Henningsen	Rep	Otto H. Henningsen	Rep
24th	Marion Claire Hamiel	Rep	Edwin Charles Schluter	Rep
29th	Ross Rutledge Mowry	Rep	Ross Rutledge Mowry	Rep
30th	George M. Faul	Rep	George M. Faul	Rep
32nd	Robert Prentis Munger	Rep	Adrian D. Clem	Rep
34th	Robert W. Harvey	Rep	Robert W. Harvey	Rep
35th	Howard C. Baldwin	Dem	Robert C. Reilly	Dem
37th	George Raymond Hill	Rep	George Raymond Hill	Rep
38th	John Peter Berg	Rep	John Peter Berg	Rep
42nd	Edward Henry Vrba	Dem	Edward Henry Vrba	Dem
44th	Edward P. Donohue	Rep	Ralph W. Zastrow	Rep
45th	Richard V. Leo	Rep	Richard V. Leo	Rep
48th	Ralph E. Benson	Rep	Ralph E. Benson	Rep
50th	Albert Josiah Shaw	Rep	Albert Josiah Shaw	Rep

== Detailed Results ==
- NOTE: The 27 districts that did not hold elections in 1942 are not listed here.
- Note: If a district does not list a primary, then that district did not have a competitive primary (i.e., there may have only been one candidate file for that district).

=== District 1 ===
Iowa Senate, District 1 Republican Primary Election, 1942
Party	Candidate	Votes	%
Republican	Stanley L. Hart (incumbent)	1,466	62.1
Republican	Heinold	893	37.9
Total votes		2,359	100.0

Iowa Senate, District 1 General Election, 1942
Party	Candidate	Votes	%
Republican	Stanley L. Hart (incumbent)	7,582	100.0
Total votes		7,582	100.0
Republican hold			

=== District 7 ===
Iowa Senate, District 7 General Election, 1942
Party	Candidate	Votes	%
Republican	Carl O. Sjulin (incumbent)	6,465	60.7
Democratic	Mike Sondag	4,180	39.3
Total votes		10,645	100.0
Republican hold			

=== District 9 ===
Iowa Senate, District 9 General Election, 1942
Party	Candidate	Votes	%
Republican	Fred Cromwell (incumbent)	6,375	67.6
Democratic	Henry M. Hartman	3,053	32.4
Total votes		9,428	100.0
Republican hold			

=== District 10 ===
Iowa Senate, District 10 General Election, 1942
Party	Candidate	Votes	%
Republican	Harlan C. Foster	8,325	100.0
Total votes		8,325	100.0
Republican hold			

=== District 12 ===
Iowa Senate, District 12 General Election, 1942
Party	Candidate	Votes	%
Republican	Luke Vittetoe	8,111	65.9
Democratic	J. Forest Embree	4,194	34.1
Total votes		12,305	100.0
Republican hold			

=== District 13 ===
Iowa Senate, District 13 Democratic Primary Election, 1942
Party	Candidate	Votes	%
Democratic	Chester L. Johns	1,275	68.1
Democratic	Bradley	596	31.9
Total votes		1,871	100.0

Iowa Senate, District 13 General Election, 1942
Party	Candidate	Votes	%
Republican	E. K. Bekman (incumbent)	6,488	55.5
Democratic	Chester L. Johns	5,205	44.5
Total votes		11,693	100.0
Republican hold			

=== District 18 ===
Iowa Senate, District 18 General Election, 1942
Party	Candidate	Votes	%
Republican	Frank Pelzer (incumbent)	6,315	56.1
Democratic	George M. Olsen	4,936	43.9
Total votes		11,251	100.0
Republican hold			

=== District 20 ===
Iowa Senate, District 20 General Election, 1942
Party	Candidate	Votes	%
Republican	F. J. Pine	7,383	68.6
Democratic	C. R. Metcalf	3,376	31.4
Total votes		10,759	100.0
Republican hold			

=== District 21 ===
Iowa Senate, District 21 General Election, 1942
Party	Candidate	Votes	%
Republican	Frank D. Martin (incumbent)	10,623	61.2
Democratic	Henry O. Wichelmann	6,728	38.8
Total votes		17,351	100.0
Republican hold			

=== District 22 ===
Iowa Senate, District 22 Republican Primary Election, 1942
Party	Candidate	Votes	%
Republican	O. H. Henningsen (incumbent)	1,340	67.8
Republican	Harvey	636	32.2
Total votes		1,976	100.0

Iowa Senate, District 22 General Election, 1942
Party	Candidate	Votes	%
Republican	O. H. Henningsen (incumbent)	7,845	62.7
Democratic	Jay G. Sullivan	4,671	37.3
Total votes		12,516	100.0
Republican hold			

=== District 24 ===
Iowa Senate, District 24 General Election, 1942
Party	Candidate	Votes	%
Republican	Edwin C. Schluter	6,566	61.8
Democratic	Thomas Stimpson	4,060	38.2
Total votes		10,626	100.0
Republican hold			

=== District 29 ===
Iowa Senate, District 29 General Election, 1942
Party	Candidate	Votes	%
Republican	Ross R. Mowry (incumbent)	5,050	56.3
Democratic	G. Frank Wilson	3,927	43.7
Total votes		8,977	100.0
Republican hold			

=== District 30 ===
Iowa Senate, District 30 Republican Primary Election, 1942
Party	Candidate	Votes	%
Republican	George Faul (incumbent)	12,564	75.7
Republican	Harrison	4,032	24.3
Total votes		16,596	100.0

Iowa Senate, District 30 General Election, 1942
Party	Candidate	Votes	%
Republican	George Faul (incumbent)	26,430	61.1
Democratic	Vincent L. Browner	16,840	38.9
Total votes		43,270	100.0
Republican hold			

=== District 32 ===
Iowa Senate, District 32 General Election, 1942
Party	Candidate	Votes	%
Republican	A. D. Clem	12,435	59.1
Democratic	Arthur G. Hess	8,606	40.9
Total votes		21,041	100.0
Republican hold			

=== District 34 ===
Iowa Senate, District 34 General Election, 1942
Party	Candidate	Votes	%
Republican	Robert W. Harvey (incumbent)	9,574	59.1
Democratic	Sewell E. Allen	6,612	40.9
Total votes		16,186	100.0
Republican hold			

=== District 35 ===
Iowa Senate, District 35 Democratic Primary Election, 1942
Party	Candidate	Votes	%
Democratic	Robert C. Reilly	3,891	59.9
Democratic	Bitter	2,602	40.1
Total votes		6,493	100.0

Iowa Senate, District 35 General Election, 1942
Party	Candidate	Votes	%
Democratic	Robert C. Reilly	10,891	100.0
Total votes		10,891	100.0
Democratic hold			

=== District 37 ===
Iowa Senate, District 37 General Election, 1942
Party	Candidate	Votes	%
Republican	G. R. Hill (incumbent)	11,231	100.0
Total votes		11,231	100.0
Republican hold			

=== District 38 ===
Iowa Senate, District 38 Republican Primary Election, 1942
Party	Candidate	Votes	%
Republican	John P. Berg (incumbent)	3,433	55.7
Republican	Galloway	2,726	44.3
Total votes		6,159	100.0

Iowa Senate, District 38 General Election, 1942
Party	Candidate	Votes	%
Republican	John P. Berg (incumbent)	13,418	66.4
Democratic	H. W. Bergey	6,784	33.6
Total votes		20,202	100.0
Republican hold			

=== District 42 ===
Iowa Senate, District 42 General Election, 1942
Party	Candidate	Votes	%
Democratic	Ed Vrba (incumbent)	7,016	53.3
Republican	Ellis J. Hook	6,135	46.7
Total votes		13,151	100.0
Democratic hold			

=== District 44 ===
Iowa Senate, District 44 General Election, 1942
Party	Candidate	Votes	%
Republican	Ralph W. Zastrow	6,433	60.3
Democratic	Frank Brunner	4,242	39.7
Total votes		10,675	100.0
Republican hold			

=== District 45 ===
Iowa Senate, District 45 General Election, 1942
Party	Candidate	Votes	%
Republican	Richard V. Leo (incumbent)	8,076	62.6
Democratic	Paul Mathern	4,815	37.4
Total votes		12,891	100.0
Republican hold			

=== District 48 ===
Iowa Senate, District 48 General Election, 1942
Party	Candidate	Votes	%
Republican	Ralph E. Benson (incumbent)	8,341	62.5
Democratic	Claude Johnson	5,015	37.5
Total votes		13,356	100.0
Republican hold			

=== District 50 ===
Iowa Senate, District 50 General Election, 1942
Party	Candidate	Votes	%
Republican	Albert J. Shaw (incumbent)	8,203	72.4
Democratic	Messer Leith	3,121	27.6
Total votes		11,324	100.0
Republican hold			

== See also ==
- United States elections, 1942
- United States House of Representatives elections in Iowa, 1942
- Elections in Iowa
