= 1946 Iowa Senate election =

- November 5, 1946

23 out of 50 seats in the Iowa State Senate 26 seats needed for a majority
| | Majority party | Minority party |
|---|---|---|
| Party | Republican | Democratic |
| Last election | 45 | 5 |
| Seats after | 46 | 4 |
| Seat change | ▲1 | ▼1 |

The 1946 Iowa State Senate elections took place as part of the biennial 1946 United States elections. Iowa voters elected state senators in 23 of the state senate's 50 districts. State senators serve four-year terms in the Iowa State Senate.

A statewide map of the 50 state Senate districts in the 1946 elections is provided by the Iowa General Assembly here.

The primary election on June 3, 1946, determined which candidates appeared on the November 5, 1946 general election ballot.

Following the previous election, Republicans had control of the Iowa state Senate with 45 seats to Democrats' 5 seats.

To claim control of the chamber from Republicans, the Democrats needed to net 21 Senate seats.

Republicans maintained control of the Iowa State Senate following the 1946 general election with the balance of power shifting to Republicans holding 46 seats and Democrats having 4 seats (a net gain of 1 seat for Republicans).

== Summary of Results ==
- Note: The 27 holdover Senators not up for re-election are not listed on this table.

| State Senate District | Incumbent | Party | Incoming Senator | Party |
|---|---|---|---|---|
| 1st | Stanley Lawrence Hart | Rep | Stanley Lawrence Hart | Rep |
| 6th | Ole John Kirketeg | Rep | Kathlyn M. Kirketeg | Rep |
| 7th | Carl Oscar Sjulin | Rep | Earl C. Fishbaugh | Rep |
| 9th | Frederick P. Cromwell | Rep | William Nielsen Skourup | Rep |
| 10th | Harlan C. Foster | Rep | Harlan C. Foster | Rep |
| 12th | Luke Vittetoe | Rep | Luke Vittetoe | Rep |
| 13th | Elmer K. Bekman | Rep | Elmer K. Bekman | Rep |
| 16th | Harry Samuel Love | Rep | John Lyle Musmaker | Rep |
| 18th | Edward Speer White | Rep | Jay C. Colburn | Rep |
| 20th | Floyd J. Pine | Rep | Herman B. Lord | Rep |
| 21st | Frank D. Martin | Rep | Frank D. Martin | Rep |
| 22nd | Otto H. Henningsen | Rep | Otto H. Henningsen | Rep |
| 29th | Ross Rutledge Mowry | Rep | Fred Maytag | Rep |
| 30th | George M. Faul | Rep | George M. Faul | Rep |
| 34th | Robert W. Harvey | Rep | Eli Clarence Myrland | Rep |
| 35th | Robert C. Reilly | Dem | Robert C. Reilly | Dem |
| 37th | George Raymond Hill | Rep | Rex R. Bateson | Rep |
| 38th | John Peter Berg | Rep | John Peter Berg | Rep |
| 42nd | Edward Henry Vrba | Dem | William Linnevold | Rep |
| 44th | Ralph W. Zastrow | Rep | Ralph W. Zastrow | Rep |
| 45th | Richard V. Leo | Rep | Richard V. Leo | Rep |
| 48th | Ralph E. Benson | Rep | Ralph E. Benson | Rep |
| 50th | Albert Josiah Shaw | Rep | Jacob Frederick Miller | Rep |

== Detailed Results ==
- NOTE: The 27 districts that did not hold elections in 1946 are not listed here.
- Note: If a district does not list a primary, then that district did not have a competitive primary (i.e., there may have only been one candidate file for that district).

=== District 1 ===
Iowa Senate, District 1 General Election, 1946
| Party | Candidate | Votes | % |
|---|---|---|---|
| Republican | Stanley L. Hart (incumbent) | 6,445 | 56.9 |
| Democratic | Orville Meyer | 4,877 | 43.1 |
| Total votes | | 11,322 | 100.0 |
| Republican hold | | | |

=== District 6 ===
Iowa Senate, District 6 General Election, 1946
| Party | Candidate | Votes | % |
|---|---|---|---|
| Republican | Kathlyn M. Kirketeg | 4,486 | 100.0 |
| Total votes | | 4,486 | 100.0 |
| Republican hold | | | |

=== District 7 ===
Iowa Senate, District 7 General Election, 1946
| Party | Candidate | Votes | % |
|---|---|---|---|
| Republican | Earl C. Fishbaugh, Jr. | 5,896 | 100.0 |
| Total votes | | 5,896 | 100.0 |
| Republican hold | | | |

=== District 9 ===
Iowa Senate, District 9 General Election, 1946
| Party | Candidate | Votes | % |
|---|---|---|---|
| Republican | W. N. Skourup | 4,859 | 52.5 |
| Democratic | John Dunn Martin | 4,399 | 47.5 |
| Total votes | | 9,258 | 100.0 |
| Republican hold | | | |

=== District 10 ===
Iowa Senate, District 10 General Election, 1946
| Party | Candidate | Votes | % |
|---|---|---|---|
| Republican | Harlan C. Foster (incumbent) | 6,394 | 68.8 |
| Democratic | Ralph H. Smutz | 2,900 | 31.2 |
| Total votes | | 9,294 | 100.0 |
| Republican hold | | | |

=== District 12 ===
Iowa Senate, District 12 General Election, 1946
| Party | Candidate | Votes | % |
|---|---|---|---|
| Republican | Luke Vittetoe (incumbent) | 7,076 | 100.0 |
| Total votes | | 7,076 | 100.0 |
| Republican hold | | | |

=== District 13 ===
Iowa Senate, District 13 General Election, 1946
| Party | Candidate | Votes | % |
|---|---|---|---|
| Republican | E. K. Bekman (incumbent) | 6,583 | 53.6 |
| Democratic | John B. Shea | 5,700 | 46.4 |
| Total votes | | 12,283 | 100.0 |
| Republican hold | | | |

=== District 16 ===
Iowa Senate, District 16 General Election, 1946
| Party | Candidate | Votes | % |
|---|---|---|---|
| Republican | J. Lyle Musmaker | 4,621 | 69.1 |
| Democratic | John K. Sawyer | 2,071 | 30.9 |
| Total votes | | 6,692 | 100.0 |
| Republican hold | | | |

=== District 18 ===
Iowa Senate, District 18 Republican Primary Election, 1946
| Party | Candidate | Votes | % |
|---|---|---|---|
| Republican | Jay C. Colburn | 1,493 | 50.7 |
| Republican | Julius A. Lensch | 1,451 | 49.3 |
| Total votes | | 2,944 | 100.0 |

Iowa Senate, District 18 General Election, 1946
| Party | Candidate | Votes | % |
|---|---|---|---|
| Republican | Jay C. Colburn | 6,243 | 65.6 |
| Democratic | Lars P. Nielsen | 3,274 | 34.4 |
| Total votes | | 9,517 | 100.0 |
| Republican hold | | | |

=== District 20 ===
Iowa Senate, District 20 Republican Primary Election, 1946
| Party | Candidate | Votes | % |
|---|---|---|---|
| Republican | Herman B. Lord | 2,415 | 52.2 |
| Republican | F. A. (Ted) Latchaw | 2,211 | 47.8 |
| Total votes | | 4,626 | 100.0 |

Iowa Senate, District 20 General Election, 1946
| Party | Candidate | Votes | % |
|---|---|---|---|
| Republican | Herman B. Lord | 6,285 | 67.2 |
| Democratic | Gale McClean | 3,069 | 32.8 |
| Total votes | | 9,354 | 100.0 |
| Republican hold | | | |

=== District 21 ===
Iowa Senate, District 21 General Election, 1946
| Party | Candidate | Votes | % |
|---|---|---|---|
| Republican | Frank D. Martin (incumbent) | 12,226 | 59.9 |
| Democratic | Walter Dietz | 8,181 | 40.1 |
| Total votes | | 20,407 | 100.0 |
| Republican hold | | | |

=== District 22 ===
Iowa Senate, District 22 General Election, 1946
| Party | Candidate | Votes | % |
|---|---|---|---|
| Republican | O. H. Henningsen (incumbent) | 8,140 | 64.5 |
| Democratic | Robert C. Redman | 4,482 | 35.5 |
| Total votes | | 12,622 | 100.0 |
| Republican hold | | | |

=== District 29 ===
Iowa Senate, District 29 Republican Primary Election, 1946
| Party | Candidate | Votes | % |
|---|---|---|---|
| Republican | Fred Maytag | 2,417 | 77.1 |
| Republican | Ross R. Mowry (incumbent) | 719 | 22.9 |
| Total votes | | 3,136 | 100.0 |

Iowa Senate, District 29 General Election, 1946
| Party | Candidate | Votes | % |
|---|---|---|---|
| Republican | Fred Maytag | 4,799 | 60.7 |
| Democratic | W. Russell Hayes | 3,108 | 39.3 |
| Total votes | | 7,907 | 100.0 |
| Republican hold | | | |

=== District 30 ===
Iowa Senate, District 30 Republican Primary Election, 1946
| Party | Candidate | Votes | % |
|---|---|---|---|
| Republican | George Faul (incumbent) | 9,168 | 54.2 |
| Republican | Harris M. Coggeshall | 7,737 | 45.8 |
| Total votes | | 16,905 | 100.0 |

Iowa Senate, District 30 General Election, 1946
| Party | Candidate | Votes | % |
|---|---|---|---|
| Republican | George Faul (incumbent) | 24,563 | 56.7 |
| Democratic | George E. O'Malley | 18,721 | 43.3 |
| Total votes | | 43,284 | 100.0 |
| Republican hold | | | |

=== District 34 ===
Iowa Senate, District 34 General Election, 1946
| Party | Candidate | Votes | % |
|---|---|---|---|
| Republican | E. C. Myrland | 7,726 | 52.2 |
| Democratic | William M. Tatum | 7,065 | 47.8 |
| Total votes | | 14,791 | 100.0 |
| Republican hold | | | |

=== District 35 ===
Iowa Senate, District 35 General Election, 1946
| Party | Candidate | Votes | % |
|---|---|---|---|
| Democratic | Robert C. Reilly (incumbent) | 8,757 | 100.0 |
| Total votes | | 8,757 | 100.0 |
| Democratic hold | | | |

=== District 37 ===
Iowa Senate, District 37 General Election, 1946
| Party | Candidate | Votes | % |
|---|---|---|---|
| Republican | G. R. Hill (incumbent) | 9,068 | 100.0 |
| Total votes | | 9,068 | 100.0 |
| Republican hold | | | |

- Senator Hill resigned from the Senate before being sworn in to another term. This necessitated a special election.

Iowa Senate, District 37 Special Election, January 6, 1947
| Party | Candidate | Votes | % |
|---|---|---|---|
| Republican | R. R. Bateson | 2,440 | 47.8 |
| Democratic | Frank J. Lund | 2,258 | 44.2 |
| Independent | William Schmedika | 409 | 8.0 |
| Total votes | | 5,107 | 100.0 |
| Republican hold | | | |

=== District 38 ===
Iowa Senate, District 38 General Election, 1946
| Party | Candidate | Votes | % |
|---|---|---|---|
| Republican | John P. Berg (incumbent) | 12,246 | 64.1 |
| Democratic | Emery W. Loomis | 6,859 | 35.9 |
| Total votes | | 19,105 | 100.0 |
| Republican hold | | | |

=== District 42 ===
Iowa Senate, District 42 Republican Primary Election, 1946
| Party | Candidate | Votes | % |
|---|---|---|---|
| Republican | William Linnevold | 2,166 | 65.4 |
| Republican | E. T. Haugen | 1,148 | 34.6 |
| Total votes | | 3,314 | 100.0 |

Iowa Senate, District 42 General Election, 1946
| Party | Candidate | Votes | % |
|---|---|---|---|
| Republican | William Linnevold | 6,560 | 54.1 |
| Democratic | Ed Vrba (incumbent) | 5,568 | 45.9 |
| Total votes | | 12,128 | 100.0 |
| Republican gain from Democratic | | | |

=== District 44 ===
Iowa Senate, District 44 General Election, 1946
| Party | Candidate | Votes | % |
|---|---|---|---|
| Republican | Ralph W. Zastrow (incumbent) | 5,347 | 58.5 |
| Democratic | Stanley Keating | 3,800 | 41.5 |
| Total votes | | 9,147 | 100.0 |
| Republican hold | | | |

=== District 45 ===
Iowa Senate, District 45 General Election, 1946
| Party | Candidate | Votes | % |
|---|---|---|---|
| Republican | Richard V. Leo (incumbent) | 6,793 | 100.0 |
| Total votes | | 6,793 | 100.0 |
| Republican hold | | | |

=== District 48 ===
Iowa Senate, District 48 Republican Primary Election, 1946
| Party | Candidate | Votes | % |
|---|---|---|---|
| Republican | Ralph E. Benson (incumbent) | 1,968 | 50.6 |
| Republican | Carroll A. Lane | 1,924 | 49.4 |
| Total votes | | 3,892 | 100.0 |

Iowa Senate, District 48 General Election, 1946
| Party | Candidate | Votes | % |
|---|---|---|---|
| Republican | Ralph E. Benson (incumbent) | 6,711 | 55.2 |
| Democratic | Peter F. Hansen | 5,442 | 44.8 |
| Total votes | | 12,153 | 100.0 |
| Republican hold | | | |

=== District 50 ===
Iowa Senate, District 50 Republican Primary Election, 1946
| Party | Candidate | Votes | % |
|---|---|---|---|
| Republican | J. F. Miller | 3,209 | 51.4 |
| Republican | Guy E. Mack | 3,033 | 48.6 |
| Total votes | | 6,242 | 100.0 |

Iowa Senate, District 50 General Election, 1946
| Party | Candidate | Votes | % |
|---|---|---|---|
| Republican | J. F. Miller | 6,253 | 61.0 |
| Democratic | LeRoy A. Rader | 3,999 | 39.0 |
| Total votes | | 10,252 | 100.0 |
| Republican hold | | | |

== See also ==
- United States elections, 1946
- United States House of Representatives elections in Iowa, 1946
- Elections in Iowa
