= 1934 Iowa Senate election =

- November 6, 1934

22 out of 50 seats in the Iowa State Senate 26 seats needed for a majority
	Majority party	Minority party
Party	Democratic	Republican
Last election	25	25
Seats before	24 (Note: In district 45, Democratic Senator Harry Cook White was succeeded by Republican Richard V. Leo following a special election in 1933 (a gain of the district for the Republicans).)	26
Seats after	28	22
Seat change	▲4	▼4
- Results; Democratic gain Republican gain Democratic hold Republican hold

The 1934 Iowa State Senate elections took place as part of the biennial 1934 United States elections. Iowa voters elected state senators in 22 of the state senate's 50 districts. State senators serve four-year terms in the Iowa State Senate.

A statewide map of the 50 state Senate districts in the 1934 elections is provided by the Iowa General Assembly here.

The primary election on June 4, 1934, determined which candidates appeared on the November 6, 1934 general election ballot.

Following the previous election, Republicans and Democrats each held 25 seats. Lieutenant Governor Nelson Kraschel was a Democrat and wielded power as President of the Iowa Senate. Following a special election in 1933 in district 45, Republicans flipped the forty-fifth district to their party. Therefore, on election day in November 1934, Republicans held 26 seats to Democrats' 24.

To claim control of the chamber from Republicans, the Democrats needed to net 2 Senate seats.

Democrats gained control of the Iowa State Senate following the 1934 general election with the balance of power shifting to Democrats holding 28 seats and Republicans having 22 seats (a net gain of 4 seats for Democrats).

== Summary of Results ==
- Note: The 28 holdover Senators not up for re-election are not listed on this table.

State Senate District	Incumbent	Party	Elected Senator	Party
1st	Joseph R. Frailey	Rep	Timothy Francis Driscoll	Dem
7th	Frank Iradelle Coykendall	Dem	Paul Lambert Millhone	Rep
9th	Clyde Hamilton Topping	Rep	James M. Bell	Dem
10th	William Carden	Rep	Arthur Claire Dewey	Rep
12th	Frank M. Beatty	Rep	Eugene Irving Mason	Dem
13th	Roy E. Stevens	Dem	Roy E. Stevens	Dem
18th	Charles D. Booth	Rep	Charles E. Malone	Dem
20th	Edwin R. Hicklin	Rep	Elmer Primer Corwin	Rep
21st	David W. Kimberly	Rep	David W. Kimberly	Rep
22nd	Harold L. Irwin	Dem	Harold L. Irwin	Dem
29th	D. Myron Tripp	Dem	John W. Billingsley	Rep
30th	George Allison Wilson	Rep	George Allison Wilson	Rep
33rd	Warren F. Miller	Dem	George L. Parker	Rep
34th	Oliver P. Bennett	Rep	Andrew Bell	Dem
35th	Howard C. Baldwin	Dem	Howard C. Baldwin	Dem
37th	Irving H. Knudson	Rep	Irving H. Knudson	Rep
38th	Edward J. Wenner	Rep	John Peter Berg	Rep
42nd	William Henry Klemme	Rep	Samuel D. Goetsch	Dem
44th	Lafe Hill	Rep	Edward P. Donohue	Rep
45th	Richard V. Leo	Rep	Henry Julius Grunewald	Dem
48th	I. G. Chrystal	Dem	I. G. Chrystal	Dem
50th	William Robert Ritchie	Rep	Albert Josiah Shaw	Rep

== Detailed Results ==
- NOTE: The 28 districts that did not hold elections in 1934 are not listed here.
- Note: If a district does not list a primary, then that district did not have a competitive primary (i.e., there may have only been one candidate file for that district).

=== District 1 ===
Iowa Senate, District 1 General Election, 1934
Party	Candidate	Votes	%
Democratic	T. F. Driscoll	7,661	51.1
Republican	Joe R. Frailey (incumbent)	7,336	48.9
Total votes		14,997	100.0
Democratic gain from Republican			

=== District 7 ===
Iowa Senate, District 7 General Election, 1934
Party	Candidate	Votes	%
Republican	Paul L. Millhone	7,446	50.7
Democratic	Frank I. Coykendall (incumbent)	7,248	49.3
Total votes		14,694	100.0
Republican gain from Democratic			

=== District 9 ===
Iowa Senate, District 9 Republican Primary Election, 1934
Party	Candidate	Votes	%
Republican	Carl W. Setterberg	1,468	50.3
Republican	Clyde Hamilton Topping (incumbent)	1,451	49.7
Total votes		2,919	100.0

Iowa Senate, District 9 Democratic Primary Election, 1934
Party	Candidate	Votes	%
Democratic	James M. Bell	1,329	51.9
Democratic	Wells	1,232	48.1
Total votes		2,561	100.0

Iowa Senate, District 9 General Election, 1934
Party	Candidate	Votes	%
Democratic	James M. Bell	6,823	57.0
Republican	Carl W. Setterberg	5,150	43.0
Total votes		11,973	100.0
Democratic gain from Republican			

=== District 10 ===
Iowa Senate, District 10 Republican Primary Election, 1934
Party	Candidate	Votes	%
Republican	Claire Dewey	3,265	53.5
Republican	Speidel	2,839	46.5
Total votes		6,104	100.0

Iowa Senate, District 10 Democratic Primary Election, 1934
Party	Candidate	Votes	%
Democratic	Howard A. Baxter	997	56.2
Democratic	Miller	778	43.8
Total votes		1,775	100.0

Iowa Senate, District 10 General Election, 1934
Party	Candidate	Votes	%
Republican	Claire Dewey	7,188	55.6
Democratic	Howard A. Baxter	5,744	44.4
Total votes		12,932	100.0
Republican hold			

=== District 12 ===
Iowa Senate, District 12 Republican Primary Election, 1934
Party	Candidate	Votes	%
Republican	James Scovel	1,893	35.8
Republican	Hicks	1,755	33.2
Republican	Talbott	1,645	31.0
Total votes		5,293	100.0

Iowa Senate, District 12 Democratic Primary Election, 1934
Party	Candidate	Votes	%
Democratic	E. I. Mason	1,059	57.8
Democratic	Adkins	773	42.2
Total votes		1,832	100.0

Iowa Senate, District 12 General Election, 1934
Party	Candidate	Votes	%
Democratic	E. I. Mason	7,432	51.1
Republican	James Scovel	7,112	48.9
Total votes		14,544	100.0
Democratic gain from Republican			

=== District 13 ===
Iowa Senate, District 13 Democratic Primary Election, 1934
Party	Candidate	Votes	%
Democratic	Roy E. Stevens (incumbent)	963	51.2
Democratic	Nevin	918	48.8
Total votes		1,881	100.0

Iowa Senate, District 13 General Election, 1934
Party	Candidate	Votes	%
Democratic	Roy E. Stevens (incumbent)	7,605	57.3
Republican	Frank Shane	5,677	42.7
Total votes		13,282	100.0
Democratic hold			

=== District 18 ===
Iowa Senate, District 18 General Election, 1934
Party	Candidate	Votes	%
Democratic	C. E. Malone	7,827	51.1
Republican	Frank Pelzer	7,487	48.9
Total votes		15,314	100.0
Democratic gain from Republican			

=== District 20 ===
Iowa Senate, District 20 Democratic Primary Election, 1934
Party	Candidate	Votes	%
Democratic	Edward M. Baker	477	53.2
Democratic	Madden	419	46.8
Total votes		896	100.0

Iowa Senate, District 20 General Election, 1934
Party	Candidate	Votes	%
Republican	Elmer P. Corwin	7,049	54.0
Democratic	Edward M. Baker	6,012	46.0
Total votes		13,061	100.0
Republican hold			

=== District 21 ===
Iowa Senate, District 21 Republican Primary Election, 1934
Party	Candidate	Votes	%
Republican	D. W. Kimberly (incumbent)	3,285	63.4
Republican	Wissler	1,895	36.6
Total votes		5,180	100.0

Iowa Senate, District 21 General Election, 1934
Party	Candidate	Votes	%
Republican	D. W. Kimberly (incumbent)	10,608	95.7
Farmer–Labor	Frank E. Gertz	479	4.3
Total votes		11,087	100.0
Republican hold			

=== District 22 ===
Iowa Senate, District 22 Republican Primary Election, 1934
Party	Candidate	Votes	%
Republican	Merritt L. Sutton	2,758	59.3
Republican	Lee	1,157	24.9
Republican	Rice	738	15.8
Total votes		4,653	100.0

Iowa Senate, District 22 General Election, 1934
Party	Candidate	Votes	%
Democratic	Harold L. Irwin (incumbent)	9,348	54.8
Republican	Merritt L. Sutton	7,715	45.2
Total votes		17,063	100.0
Democratic hold			

=== District 29 ===
Iowa Senate, District 29 Republican Primary Election, 1934
Party	Candidate	Votes	%
Republican	J. W. Billingsley	1,902	62.0
Republican	Morgan	1,168	38.0
Total votes		3,070	100.0

Iowa Senate, District 29 General Election, 1934
Party	Candidate	Votes	%
Republican	J. W. Billingsley	5,616	51.9
Democratic	D. Myron Tripp (incumbent)	5,197	48.1
Total votes		10,813	100.0
Republican gain from Democratic			

=== District 30 ===
Iowa Senate, District 30 Republican Primary Election, 1934
Party	Candidate	Votes	%
Republican	George A. Wilson (incumbent)	7,639	40.8
Republican	Connolly, Jr.	6,486	34.6
Republican	Miller	4,597	24.6
Total votes		18,722	100.0

Iowa Senate, District 30 General Election, 1934
Party	Candidate	Votes	%
Republican	George A. Wilson (incumbent)	26,559	53.8
Democratic	E. Oren Wallace	22,780	46.2
Total votes		49,339	100.0
Republican hold			

=== District 33 ===
Iowa Senate, District 33 Republican Primary Election, 1934
Party	Candidate	Votes	%
Republican	George L. Parker	3,963	74.8
Republican	Rigby	1,338	25.2
Total votes		5,301	100.0

Iowa Senate, District 33 General Election, 1934
Party	Candidate	Votes	%
Republican	George L. Parker	7,640	52.7
Democratic	Dr. J. H. McGready	6,868	47.3
Total votes		14,508	100.0
Republican gain from Democratic			

=== District 34 ===
Iowa Senate, District 34 Democratic Primary Election, 1934
Party	Candidate	Votes	%
Democratic	Andrew Bell	3,929	63.0
Democratic	Rawlings	2,312	37.0
Total votes		6,241	100.0

Iowa Senate, District 34 General Election, 1934
Party	Candidate	Votes	%
Democratic	Andrew Bell	12,509	51.6
Republican	Hugo P. Saggan	9,548	39.4
Farmer–Labor	Charles Croghan	2,169	9.0
Total votes		24,226	100.0
Democratic gain from Republican			

=== District 35 ===
Iowa Senate, District 35 General Election, 1934
Party	Candidate	Votes	%
Democratic	H. C. Baldwin (incumbent)	14,348	71.5
Republican	Charles W. Datisman	5,729	28.5
Total votes		20,077	100.0
Democratic hold			

=== District 37 ===
Iowa Senate, District 37 Republican Primary Election, 1934
Party	Candidate	Votes	%
Republican	Irving H. Knudson (incumbent)	4,109	42.6
Republican	Oscar Ulstad	3,496	36.3
Republican	William Schmedika	2,031	21.1
Total votes		9,636	100.0

Iowa Senate, District 37 General Election, 1934
Party	Candidate	Votes	%
Republican	Irving H. Knudson (incumbent)	9,344	51.9
Democratic	Dewey Gilbert	8,665	48.1
Total votes		18,009	100.0
Republican hold			

=== District 38 ===
Iowa Senate, District 38 Republican Primary Election, 1934
Party	Candidate	Votes	%
Republican	John Berg	4,788	51.6
Republican	Edward J. Wenner (incumbent)	3,411	36.8
Republican	Aschenbrenner	1,079	11.6
Total votes		9,278	100.0

Iowa Senate, District 38 General Election, 1934
Party	Candidate	Votes	%
Republican	John Berg	13,581	52.6
Democratic	John G. Miller	12,235	47.4
Total votes		25,816	100.0
Republican hold			

=== District 42 ===
Iowa Senate, District 42 Democratic Primary Election, 1934
Party	Candidate	Votes	%
Democratic	Sam D. Goetsch	1,785	56.6
Democratic	Peckham	1,368	43.4
Total votes		3,153	100.0

Iowa Senate, District 42 General Election, 1934
Party	Candidate	Votes	%
Democratic	Sam D. Goetsch	8,386	53.0
Republican	C. C. Burgess	7,430	47.0
Total votes		15,816	100.0
Democratic gain from Republican			

=== District 44 ===
Iowa Senate, District 44 Republican Primary Election, 1934
Party	Candidate	Votes	%
Republican	E. P. Donohue	2,662	50.2
Republican	Lafe Hill (incumbent)	2,639	49.8
Total votes		5,301	100.0

Iowa Senate, District 44 General Election, 1934
Party	Candidate	Votes	%
Republican	E. P. Donohue (incumbent)	7,214	54.9
Democratic	H. M. Walleser	5,924	45.1
Total votes		13,138	100.0
Republican hold			

=== District 45 ===
Iowa Senate, District 45 Democratic Primary Election, 1934
Party	Candidate	Votes	%
Democratic	H. J. Grunewald	1,756	63.1
Democratic	Box	1,028	36.9
Total votes		2,784	100.0

Iowa Senate, District 45 General Election, 1934
Party	Candidate	Votes	%
Democratic	H. J. Grunewald	8,211	51.4
Republican	Richard V. Leo (incumbent)	7,765	48.6
Total votes		15,976	100.0
Democratic gain from Republican			

=== District 48 ===
Iowa Senate, District 48 Republican Primary Election, 1934
Party	Candidate	Votes	%
Republican	Albert D. Wiese	3,334	59.8
Republican	Akin	2,244	40.2
Total votes		5,578	100.0

Iowa Senate, District 48 General Election, 1934
Party	Candidate	Votes	%
Democratic	I. G. Chrystal (incumbent)	10,816	56.8
Republican	Albert D. Wiese	8,215	43.2
Total votes		19,031	100.0
Democratic hold			

=== District 50 ===
Iowa Senate, District 50 Republican Primary Election, 1934
Party	Candidate	Votes	%
Republican	A. J. Shaw	4,433	63.5
Republican	William Robert Ritchie (incumbent)	2,549	36.5
Total votes		6,982	100.0

Iowa Senate, District 50 Democratic Primary Election, 1934
Party	Candidate	Votes	%
Democratic	W. F. Hapsley	1,029	56.3
Democratic	Davis	798	43.7
Total votes		1,827	100.0

Iowa Senate, District 50 General Election, 1934
Party	Candidate	Votes	%
Republican	A. J. Shaw	8,322	55.6
Democratic	W. F. Hapsley	6,637	44.4
Total votes		14,959	100.0
Republican hold			

== See also ==
- United States elections, 1934
- United States House of Representatives elections in Iowa, 1934
- Elections in Iowa
