= 1914 Iowa Senate election =

- November 3, 1914

22 out of 50 seats in the Iowa State Senate 26 seats needed for a majority
	Majority party	Minority party
Party	Republican	Democratic
Last election	32	18
Seats after	35	15
Seat change	▲3	▼3
- Results; Democratic gain Republican gain Democratic hold Republican hold

The 1914 Iowa State Senate elections took place as part of the biennial 1914 United States elections. Iowa voters elected state senators in 22 of the state senate's 50 districts. State senators serve four-year terms in the Iowa State Senate.

A statewide map of the 50 state Senate districts in the 1914 elections is provided by the Iowa General Assembly here.

The primary election on June 1, 1914, determined which candidates appeared on the November 3, 1914 general election ballot.

Following the previous election, Republicans had control of the Iowa Senate with 32 seats to Democrats' 18 seats.

To claim control of the chamber from Republicans, the Democrats needed to net 8 Senate seats.

Republicans maintained control of the Iowa State Senate following the 1914 general election with the balance of power shifting to Republicans holding 35 seats and Democrats having 15 seats (a net gain of 3 seats for Republicans).

== Summary of Results ==
- Note: The 28 holdover Senators not up for re-election are not listed on this table.

State Senate District	Incumbent	Party	Elected Senator	Party
1st	Edward Patrick McManus	Dem	Joseph R. Frailey	Rep
7th	John J. Dunnegan	Dem	Herbert Inghram Foskett	Rep
9th	LaMonte Cowles	Rep	Frank E. Thompson	Rep
10th	Samuel Wakefield Neal	Rep	John Milton Lindl(e)y (Note: The Senator's name is listed as both "Lindly" and "Lindley" on the Iowa Senate website.)	Dem
12th	Henry W. Spaulding	Rep	Charles C. Laffer	Rep
13th	John Francis Webber	Dem	Chester W. Whitmore	Rep
17th	Anthony Milroy McColl	Rep	John Wasson Foster	Rep
18th	Thomas Henry White	Rep	John Cramer Voorhees	Dem
20th	Alexander Middleton Garrett	Dem	Frederick William Eversmeyer	Rep
21st	August A. Balluff	Dem	Fred G. Henigbaum	Rep
22nd	John Lowry Wilson	Dem	William J. Greene	Dem
29th	Edward Phillip Malmberg	Rep	David S. Fleck	Dem
30th	John Benedict Sullivan	Rep	Addison Melvin Parker	Rep
34th	Edward L. Crow	Dem	Grant L. Caswell	Dem
35th	Nicholas John Schrup	Dem	Nicholas John Schrup	Dem
37th	Daniel Cady Chase	Rep	Daniel Cady Chase	Rep
38th	Sherman W. DeWolf	Dem	Henry W. Grout	Rep
42nd	Philo Milton Jewell	Rep	Lauritz M. Enger	Rep
44th	John G. Legel	Dem	George Harold Jackson	Rep
45th	Asa L. Ames	Rep	Harry Cook White	Dem
48th	Joseph Mattes	Rep	Charles C. Helmer	Rep
50th	Joseph Holmes Allen	Rep	Joseph Holmes Allen	Rep

== Detailed Results ==
Popular vote share by district: Democratic 40–49% 50–59% 80–89% / Republican 40–49% 50–59% 60–69% 70–79%

- NOTE: The 28 districts that did not hold elections in 1914 are not listed here.
- Note: If a district does not list a primary, then that district did not have a competitive primary (i.e., there may have only been one candidate file for that district).

=== District 1 ===
Iowa Senate, District 1 Republican Primary Election, 1914
Party	Candidate	Votes	%
Republican	Joseph R. Frailey	1,354	100.00%
Total votes		1,354	100.00%

Iowa Senate, District 1 Democratic Primary Election, 1914
Party	Candidate	Votes	%
Democratic	J. P. Cruikshank	1,534	60.56%
Democratic	B. A. Dolan	999	39.44%
Total votes		2,533	100.00%

Iowa Senate, District 1 Progressive Primary Election, 1914
Party	Candidate	Votes	%
Progressive	W. H. Grimwood	9	100.00%
Total votes		9	100.00%

Iowa Senate, District 1 General Election, 1914
Party	Candidate	Votes	%
Republican	Joseph R. Frailey	4,080	57.79%
Democratic	J. P. Cruikshank	2,744	38.87%
Progressive	W. B. Roberts	236	3.34%
Total votes		7,060	100.00%
Republican gain from Democratic			

=== District 7 ===
Iowa Senate, District 7 Republican Primary Election, 1914
Party	Candidate	Votes	%
Republican	H. I. Foskett	1,333	64.15%
Republican	Remer C. Campbell	745	35.85%
Total votes		2,078	100.00%

Iowa Senate, District 7 Democratic Primary Election, 1914
Party	Candidate	Votes	%
Democratic	I. G. Scott	863	100.00%
Total votes		863	100.00%

Iowa Senate, District 7 Progressive Primary Election, 1914
Party	Candidate	Votes	%
Progressive	F. P. Spencer	99	100.00%
Total votes		99	100.00%

Iowa Senate, District 7 General Election, 1914
Party	Candidate	Votes	%
Republican	H. I. Foskett	3,774	54.58%
Democratic	I. G. Scott	2,674	38.68%
Progressive	F. P. Spencer	345	4.99%
Prohibition	James Davison	121	1.75%
Total votes		6,914	100.00%
Republican gain from Democratic			

=== District 9 ===
Iowa Senate, District 9 Republican Primary Election, 1914
Party	Candidate	Votes	%
Republican	Frank E. Thompson	608	50.33%
Republican	La Monte Cowles (incumbent)	600	49.67%
Total votes		1,208	100.00%

Iowa Senate, District 9 Democratic Primary Election, 1914
Party	Candidate	Votes	%
Democratic	C. M. Conrad	1,001	63.76%
Democratic	S. H. Sater	569	36.24%
Total votes		1,570	100.00%

Iowa Senate, District 9 Progressive Primary Election, 1914
Party	Candidate	Votes	%
Progressive	Roy H. Barrett	143	100.00%
Total votes		143	100.00%

Iowa Senate, District 9 Socialist Primary Election, 1914
Party	Candidate	Votes	%
Socialist	Frank Kubisch	96	100.00%
Total votes		96	100.00%

Iowa Senate, District 9 General Election, 1914
Party	Candidate	Votes	%
Republican	Frank E. Thompson	2,806	45.46%
Democratic	C. M. Conrad	2,457	39.80%
Progressive	Roy H. Barrett	465	7.53%
Socialist	Frank Kubisch	308	4.99%
Prohibition	Lee W. Mix	137	2.22%
Total votes		6,173	100.00%
Republican hold			

=== District 10 ===
Iowa Senate, District 10 Republican Primary Election, 1914
Party	Candidate	Votes	%
Republican	F. S. Finley	2,497	100.00%
Total votes		2,497	100.00%

Iowa Senate, District 10 Democratic Primary Election, 1914
Party	Candidate	Votes	%
Democratic	John M. Lindl(e)y	886	66.52%
Democratic	G. M. Van Ausdall	446	33.48%
Total votes		1,332	100.00%

Iowa Senate, District 10 Progressive Primary Election, 1914
Party	Candidate	Votes	%
Progressive	S. L. Musselman	174	100.00%
Total votes		174	100.00%

Iowa Senate, District 10 General Election, 1914
Party	Candidate	Votes	%
Democratic	John M. Lindl(e)y	3,642	46.35%
Republican	F. S. Finley	3,611	45.96%
Progressive	S. M. Musselman	496	6.31%
Prohibition	Charles Glattly	108	1.37%
Total votes		7,857	100.00%
Democratic gain from Republican			

=== District 12 ===
Iowa Senate, District 12 Republican Primary Election, 1914
Party	Candidate	Votes	%
Republican	Charles C. Laffer	1,602	67.71%
Republican	William C. Windett	764	32.29%
Total votes		2,366	100.00%

Iowa Senate, District 12 Democratic Primary Election, 1914
Party	Candidate	Votes	%
Democratic	J. H. Platt	1,452	100.00%
Total votes		1,452	100.00%

Iowa Senate, District 12 Progressive Primary Election, 1914
Party	Candidate	Votes	%
Progressive	U. S. Chacey	282	100.00%
Total votes		282	100.00%

Iowa Senate, District 12 Socialist Primary Election, 1914
Party	Candidate	Votes	%
Socialist	E. Brolliar	4	100.00%
Total votes		4	100.00%

Iowa Senate, District 12 General Election, 1914
Party	Candidate	Votes	%
Republican	Charles C. Laffer	4,328	49.04%
Democratic	J. H. Platt	3,406	38.59%
Progressive	U. S. Chacey	800	9.06%
Prohibition	Robert Lincoln	166	1.88%
Socialist	E. Brolliar	125	1.42%
Unknown (Note: No party was listed for this candidate.)	Frank Pine	1	0.01%
Total votes		8,826	100.00%
Republican hold			

=== District 13 ===
Iowa Senate, District 13 Republican Primary Election, 1914
Party	Candidate	Votes	%
Republican	Chester W. Whitmore	1,004	56.60%
Republican	Ed. J. Moore	770	43.40%
Total votes		1,774	100.00%

Iowa Senate, District 13 Democratic Primary Election, 1914
Party	Candidate	Votes	%
Democratic	John F. Webber (incumbent)	1,340	100.00%
Total votes		1,340	100.00%

Iowa Senate, District 13 Progressive Primary Election, 1914
Party	Candidate	Votes	%
Progressive	D. H. Emery	73	100.00%
Total votes		73	100.00%

Iowa Senate, District 13 Socialist Primary Election, 1914
Party	Candidate	Votes	%
Socialist	Elmer Bull	37	100.00%
Total votes		37	100.00%

Iowa Senate, District 13 General Election, 1914
Party	Candidate	Votes	%
Republican	Chester W. Whitmore	3,297	47.45%
Democratic	John F. Webber (incumbent)	3,000	43.17%
Socialist	Elmer Buce	376	5.41%
Progressive	D. H. Emery	276	3.97%
Total votes		6,949	100.00%
Republican gain from Democratic			

=== District 17 ===
Iowa Senate, District 17 Republican Primary Election, 1914
Party	Candidate	Votes	%
Republican	John W. Foster	4,044	70.27%
Republican	Edward E. Fitsimmons	1,711	29.73%
Total votes		5,755	100.00%

Iowa Senate, District 17 Democratic Primary Election, 1914
Party	Candidate	Votes	%
Democratic	M. T. Foley	669	51.54%
Democratic	Charles Hanna	629	48.46%
Total votes		1,298	100.00%

Iowa Senate, District 17 Progressive Primary Election, 1914
Party	Candidate	Votes	%
Progressive	Sam'l Gardner	29	100.00%
Total votes		29	100.00%

Iowa Senate, District 17 Socialist Primary Election, 1914
Party	Candidate	Votes	%
Socialist	Charles McLuen	1	50.00%
Socialist	E. E. Fitsimmons	1	50.00%
Total votes		2	100.00%

Iowa Senate, District 17 General Election, 1914
Party	Candidate	Votes	%
Republican	John W. Foster	5,435	57.76%
Democratic	M. T. Foley	3,394	36.07%
Progressive	Sam'l Gardner	457	4.86%
Socialist	Charles McLuen	123	1.31%
Total votes		9,409	100.00%
Republican hold			

=== District 18 ===
Iowa Senate, District 18 Republican Primary Election, 1914
Party	Candidate	Votes	%
Republican	Thomas H. "Tobe" Smith (incumbent)	1,625	100.00%
Total votes		1,625	100.00%

Iowa Senate, District 18 Democratic Primary Election, 1914
Party	Candidate	Votes	%
Democratic	J. C. Voorhees	1,306	100.00%
Total votes		1,306	100.00%

Iowa Senate, District 18 Progressive Primary Election, 1914
Party	Candidate	Votes	%
Progressive	N. Nielson	89	100.00%
Total votes		89	100.00%

Iowa Senate, District 18 General Election, 1914
Party	Candidate	Votes	%
Democratic	J. C. Voorhees	4,171	56.51%
Republican	Thomas H. "Tobe" Smith (incumbent)	2,994	40.56%
Progressive	N. Nielson	216	2.93%
Total votes		7,381	100.00%
Democratic gain from Republican			

=== District 20 ===
Iowa Senate, District 20 Republican Primary Election, 1914
Party	Candidate	Votes	%
Republican	F. W. Eversmeyer	2,107	100.00%
Total votes		2,107	100.00%

Iowa Senate, District 20 Democratic Primary Election, 1914
Party	Candidate	Votes	%
Democratic	A. M. Garrett (incumbent)	1,103	100.00%
Total votes		1,103	100.00%

Iowa Senate, District 20 Progressive Primary Election, 1914
Party	Candidate	Votes	%
Progressive	Frederick D. Steen	46	100.00%
Total votes		46	100.00%

Iowa Senate, District 20 General Election, 1914
Party	Candidate	Votes	%
Republican	F. W. Eversmeyer	4,124	49.56%
Democratic	A. M. Garrett (incumbent)	3,639	43.73%
Progressive	Frederick D. Steen	558	6.71%
Total votes		8,321	100.00%
Republican gain from Democratic			

=== District 21 ===
Iowa Senate, District 21 Republican Primary Election, 1914
Party	Candidate	Votes	%
Republican	Fred G. Henigbaum	1,619	100.00%
Total votes		1,619	100.00%

Iowa Senate, District 21 Democratic Primary Election, 1914
Party	Candidate	Votes	%
Democratic	August A. Balluff (incumbent)	1,216	63.70%
Democratic	Mathew J. Gorman	693	36.30%
Total votes		1,909	100.00%

Iowa Senate, District 21 Progressive Primary Election, 1914
Party	Candidate	Votes	%
Progressive	M. H. Calderwood	15	100.00%
Total votes		15	100.00%

Iowa Senate, District 21 Socialist Primary Election, 1914
Party	Candidate	Votes	%
Socialist	J. D. Selman	62	100.00%
Total votes		62	100.00%

Iowa Senate, District 21 General Election, 1914
Party	Candidate	Votes	%
Republican	Fred G. Henigbaum	6,221	53.14%
Democratic	August A. Balluff (incumbent)	4,897	41.83%
Socialist	J. D. Selman	588	5.02%
Total votes		11,706	100.00%
Republican gain from Democratic			

=== District 22 ===
Iowa Senate, District 22 Republican Primary Election, 1914
Party	Candidate	Votes	%
Republican	C. L. Root	433	100.00%
Total votes		433	100.00%

Iowa Senate, District 22 Democratic Primary Election, 1914
Party	Candidate	Votes	%
Democratic	William J. Greene	1,243	52.20%
Democratic	J. H. Ingwersen	1,138	47.80%
Total votes		2,381	100.00%

Iowa Senate, District 22 Progressive Primary Election, 1914
Party	Candidate	Votes	%
Progressive	S. D. Robb	5	100.00%
Total votes		5	100.00%

Iowa Senate, District 22 Socialist Primary Election, 1914
Party	Candidate	Votes	%
Socialist	Thomas Angell	13	100.00%
Total votes		13	100.00%

Iowa Senate, District 22 General Election, 1914
Party	Candidate	Votes	%
Democratic	William J. Greene	4,104	49.67%
Republican	C. L. Root	3,908	47.30%
Socialist	Thomas Angell	164	1.98%
Progressive	S. D. Robb	86	1.04%
Total votes		8,262	100.00%
Democratic hold			

=== District 29 ===
Iowa Senate, District 29 Republican Primary Election, 1914
Party	Candidate	Votes	%
Republican	Ross R. Mowry	905	57.57%
Republican	W. J. Miller	667	42.43%
Total votes		1,572	100.00%

Iowa Senate, District 29 Democratic Primary Election, 1914
Party	Candidate	Votes	%
Democratic	D. S. Fleck	867	100.00%
Total votes		867	100.00%

Iowa Senate, District 29 Progressive Primary Election, 1914
Party	Candidate	Votes	%
Progressive	M. A. Carrier	29	100.00%
Total votes		29	100.00%

Iowa Senate, District 29 Socialist Primary Election, 1914
Party	Candidate	Votes	%
Socialist	Perry Engle	2	100.00%
Total votes		2	100.00%

Iowa Senate, District 29 General Election, 1914
Party	Candidate	Votes	%
Democratic	D. S. Fleck	2,632	49.11%
Republican	Ross R. Mowry	2,470	46.09%
Progressive	M. A. Carrier	162	3.02%
Prohibition	J. M. Woodrow	95	1.77%
Total votes		5,359	100.00%
Democratic gain from Republican			

=== District 30 ===
Iowa Senate, District 30 Republican Primary Election, 1914
Party	Candidate	Votes	%
Republican	Addison M. Parker	3,543	50.76%
Republican	Thomas Fairweather	3,437	49.24%
Total votes		6,980	100.00%

Iowa Senate, District 30 Democratic Primary Election, 1914
Party	Candidate	Votes	%
Democratic	A. K. Stewart	683	54.25%
Democratic	A. H. Hoffman	576	45.75%
Total votes		1,259	100.00%

Iowa Senate, District 30 Progressive Primary Election, 1914
Party	Candidate	Votes	%
Progressive	M. J. Wragg	111	100.00%
Total votes		111	100.00%

Iowa Senate, District 30 Socialist Primary Election, 1914
Party	Candidate	Votes	%
Socialist	C. A. Danielson	189	100.00%
Total votes		189	100.00%

Iowa Senate, District 30 General Election, 1914
Party	Candidate	Votes	%
Republican	Addison M. Parker	7,543	60.69%
Democratic	A. K. Stewart	3,366	27.08%
Progressive	M. J. Wragg	982	7.90%
Socialist	C. A. Danielson	538	4.33%
Total votes		12,429	100.00%
Republican hold			

=== District 34 ===
Iowa Senate, District 34 Republican Primary Election, 1914
Party	Candidate	Votes	%
Republican	James S. Dewell	2,399	100.00%
Total votes		2,399	100.00%

Iowa Senate, District 34 Democratic Primary Election, 1914
Party	Candidate	Votes	%
Democratic	G. L. Caswell	2,623	100.00%
Total votes		2,623	100.00%

Iowa Senate, District 34 Progressive Primary Election, 1914
Party	Candidate	Votes	%
Progressive	G. S. Waterhouse	30	100.00%
Total votes		30	100.00%

Iowa Senate, District 34 General Election, 1914
Party	Candidate	Votes	%
Democratic	G. L. Caswell	5,884	50.14%
Republican	J. S. Dewell	5,267	44.88%
Progressive	G. S. Waterhouse	584	4.98%
Total votes		11,735	100.00%
Democratic hold			

=== District 35 ===
Iowa Senate, District 35 Republican Primary Election, 1914
Party	Candidate	Votes	%
Republican	R. P. Roedell	1	100.00%
Total votes		1	100.00%

Iowa Senate, District 35 Democratic Primary Election, 1914
Party	Candidate	Votes	%
Democratic	N. J. Schrupp (incumbent)	4,736	99.98%
Democratic	W. C. Leik	1	0.02%
Total votes		4,737	100.00%

Iowa Senate, District 35 Progressive Primary Election, 1914
Party	Candidate	Votes	%
Progressive	W. C. Leik	100	100.00%
Total votes		100	100.00%

Iowa Senate, District 35 Socialist Primary Election, 1914
Party	Candidate	Votes	%
Socialist	Adam Mueller	13	100.00%
Total votes		13	100.00%

Iowa Senate, District 35 General Election, 1914
Party	Candidate	Votes	%
Democratic	N. J. Schrup (incumbent)	6,279	83.59%
Progressive	William C. Leik	991	13.19%
Socialist	Adam Mueller	242	3.22%
Total votes		7,512	100.00%
Democratic hold			

=== District 37 ===
Iowa Senate, District 37 Republican Primary Election, 1914
Party	Candidate	Votes	%
Republican	D. C. Chase (incumbent)	3,460	56.01%
Republican	William Weldon	2,718	43.99%
Total votes		6,178	100.00%

Iowa Senate, District 37 General Election, 1914
Party	Candidate	Votes	%
Republican	D. C. Chase (incumbent)	6,229	71.43%
Democratic	William Wiemer	2,211	25.35%
Prohibition	Bruce Riley	281	3.22%
Total votes		8,721	100.00%
Republican hold			

=== District 38 ===
Iowa Senate, District 38 Republican Primary Election, 1914
Party	Candidate	Votes	%
Republican	H. W. Grout	2,386	58.91%
Republican	R. N. Cowin	1,664	41.09%
Total votes		4,050	100.00%

Iowa Senate, District 38 Democratic Primary Election, 1914
Party	Candidate	Votes	%
Democratic	Sherman W. De Wolf (incumbent)	1,322	93.16%
Democratic	Harvey J. Hess	97	6.84%
Total votes		1,419	100.00%

Iowa Senate, District 38 Progressive Primary Election, 1914
Party	Candidate	Votes	%
Progressive	Harvey J. Hess	114	99.13%
Progressive	George E. Boyce	1	0.87%
Total votes		115	100.00%

Iowa Senate, District 38 General Election, 1914
Party	Candidate	Votes	%
Republican	Henry W. Grout	5,133	47.25%
Democratic	Sherman W. De Wolf (incumbent)	5,099	46.94%
Progressive	Harvey J. Hess	631	5.81%
Total votes		10,863	100.00%
Republican gain from Democratic			

=== District 42 ===
Iowa Senate, District 42 Republican Primary Election, 1914
Party	Candidate	Votes	%
Republican	Lauritz M. Enger	909	57.60%
Republican	H. L. Spaulding	669	42.40%
Total votes		1,578	100.00%

Iowa Senate, District 42 Democratic Primary Election, 1914
Party	Candidate	Votes	%
Democratic	Herman Kull	882	100.00%
Total votes		882	100.00%

Iowa Senate, District 42 Socialist Primary Election, 1914
Party	Candidate	Votes	%
Socialist	C. J. Torgrimson	2	100.00%
Total votes		2	100.00%

Iowa Senate, District 42 General Election, 1914
Party	Candidate	Votes	%
Republican	Lauritz M. Enger	3,841	52.48%
Democratic	Hermann Kull	3,329	45.48%
Socialist	C. J. Torgrimson	85	1.16%
Prohibition	W. B. Perry	64	0.87%
Total votes		7,319	100.00%
Republican hold			

=== District 44 ===
Iowa Senate, District 44 Republican Primary Election, 1914
Party	Candidate	Votes	%
Republican	George H. Jackson	1,936	100.00%
Total votes		1,936	100.00%

Iowa Senate, District 44 Democratic Primary Election, 1914
Party	Candidate	Votes	%
Democratic	John G. Legel (incumbent)	1,173	100.00%
Total votes		1,173	100.00%

Iowa Senate, District 44 General Election, 1914
Party	Candidate	Votes	%
Republican	George H. Jackson	3,628	56.34%
Democratic	John G. Legel (incumbent)	2,812	43.66%
Total votes		6,440	100.00%
Republican gain from Democratic			

=== District 45 ===
Iowa Senate, District 45 Republican Primary Election, 1914
Party	Candidate	Votes	%
Republican	A. L. Ames (incumbent)	1,724	100.00%
Total votes		1,724	100.00%

Iowa Senate, District 45 Democratic Primary Election, 1914
Party	Candidate	Votes	%
Democratic	H. C. White	966	100.00%
Total votes		966	100.00%

Iowa Senate, District 45 Socialist Primary Election, 1914
Party	Candidate	Votes	%
Socialist	H. S. Von Lacun	1	100.00%
Total votes		1	100.00%

Iowa Senate, District 45 General Election, 1914
Party	Candidate	Votes	%
Democratic	H. C. White	4,756	49.63%
Republican	A. L. Ames (incumbent)	4,638	48.40%
Socialist	H. S. Von Lacun	189	1.97%
Total votes		9,583	100.00%
Democratic gain from Republican			

=== District 48 ===
Iowa Senate, District 48 Republican Primary Election, 1914
Party	Candidate	Votes	%
Republican	S. J. Sayers	1,259	32.92%
Republican	J. A. Henderson	1,225	32.03%
Republican	Charles C. Helmer (Note: Despite placing in third in the Primary, Helmer would go on to the General election.)	705	18.44%
Republican	J. B. Hungerford	635	16.61%
Total votes		3,824	100.00%

Iowa Senate, District 48 Democratic Primary Election, 1914
Party	Candidate	Votes	%
Democratic	Joseph J. Meyers	1,982	100.00%
Total votes		1,982	100.00%

Iowa Senate, District 48 Progressive Primary Election, 1914
Party	Candidate	Votes	%
Progressive	August Lundell	70	100.00%
Total votes		70	100.00%

Iowa Senate, District 48 General Election, 1914
Party	Candidate	Votes	%
Republican	Charles C. Helmer	4,452	48.47%
Democratic	Joseph J. Meyers	4,174	45.44%
Progressive	August Lundell	559	6.09%
Total votes		9,185	100.00%
Republican hold			

=== District 50 ===
Iowa Senate, District 50 Republican Primary Election, 1914
Party	Candidate	Votes	%
Republican	Joseph H. Allen (incumbent)	2,137	53.08%
Republican	Scott C. Bradford	1,889	46.92%
Total votes		4,026	100.00%

Iowa Senate, District 50 Democratic Primary Election, 1914
Party	Candidate	Votes	%
Democratic	Fred J. Kenning	70	100.00%
Total votes		70	100.00%

Iowa Senate, District 50 Progressive Primary Election, 1914
Party	Candidate	Votes	%
Progressive	Oscar Olson	13	100.00%
Total votes		13	100.00%

Iowa Senate, District 50 General Election, 1914
Party	Candidate	Votes	%
Republican	Joseph H. Allen (incumbent)	3,983	52.61%
Democratic	Fred J. Kenning	2,586	34.16%
Progressive	Oscar Olson	1,002	13.23%
Total votes		7,571	100.00%
Republican hold			

== See also ==
- United States elections, 1914
- United States House of Representatives elections in Iowa, 1914
- Elections in Iowa
