= 1910 Iowa Senate election =

- November 8, 1910

22 out of 50 seats in the Iowa State Senate 26 seats needed for a majority
	Majority party	Minority party
Party	Republican	Democratic
Last election	34	16
Seats after	34	16
Seat change	Steady	Steady
- Results; Democratic gain Republican gain Democratic hold Republican hold

The 1910 Iowa State Senate elections took place as part of the biennial 1910 United States elections. Iowa voters elected state senators in 22 of the state senate's 50 districts. State senators serve four-year terms in the Iowa State Senate.

A statewide map of the 50 state Senate districts in the 1910 elections is provided by the Iowa General Assembly here.

The primary election on June 7, 1910, determined which candidates appeared on the November 8, 1910 general election ballot.

Following the previous election, Republicans had control of the Iowa Senate with 34 seats to Democrats' 16 seats.

To claim control of the chamber from Republicans, the Democrats needed to net 10 Senate seats.

Republicans maintained control of the Iowa State Senate following the 1910 general election with the balance of power remaining unchanged with Republicans holding 34 seats and Democrats having 16 seats.

== Summary of Results ==
- Note: The 28 holdover Senators not up for re-election are not listed on this table.

State Senate District	Incumbent	Party	Elected Senator	Party
1st	Edward Patrick McManus	Dem	Edward Patrick McManus	Dem
7th	William Darius Jamieson	Dem	John J. Dunnegan	Dem
9th	Frederick Norton Smith	Dem	LaMonte Cowles	Rep
10th	William Beeler Seeley	Rep	Samuel Wakefield Neal	Rep
12th	Elbert Warren Clark	Rep	Henry W. Spaulding	Rep
13th	Edwin G. Moon	Dem	John Francis Webber	Dem
17th	George Cosson	Rep	Anthony Milroy McColl	Rep
18th	James E. Bruce	Rep	Thomas Henry Smith	Rep
20th	Jay Ira Nichols	Rep	Alexander Middleton Garrett	Dem
21st	John A. DeArmand	Dem	August A. Balluff	Dem
22nd	John Lowry Wilson	Dem	John Lowry Wilson	Dem
29th	Frederick Louis Maytag	Rep	Edward Phillip Malmberg	Rep
30th	Cassius Clay Dowell	Rep	John Benedict Sullivan	Rep
34th	William Criner Whiting	Dem	Edward L. Crow	Dem
35th	Arfst F. Frudden	Dem	Nicholas John Schrup	Dem
37th	Charles Fremont Peterson	Rep	Daniel Cady Chase	Rep
38th	Sherman W. DeWolf	Dem	Sherman W. DeWolf	Dem
42nd	Henry Clay Burgess	Rep	Philo Milton Jewell	Rep
44th	John Foley	Dem	John G. Legel	Dem
45th	William Perry Whipple	Rep	Asa Lee Ames	Rep
48th	Joseph Mattes	Rep	Joseph Mattes	Rep
50th	Joseph Holmes Allen	Rep	Joseph Holmes Allen	Rep

== Detailed Results ==
Popular vote share by district: Democratic 40–49% 50–59% 60–69% / Republican 40–49% 50–59% 60–69% 70–79% 90–100%

- NOTE: The 28 districts that did not hold elections in 1910 are not listed here.
- Note: If a district does not list a primary, then that district did not have a competitive primary (i.e., there may have only been one candidate file for that district).

=== District 1 ===
Iowa Senate, District 1 General Election, 1910
Party	Candidate	Votes	%
Democratic	E. P. McManus (incumbent)	4,115	57.65%
Republican	Joseph Carver	3,023	42.35%
Total votes		7,138	100.00%
Democratic hold			

=== District 7 ===
Iowa Senate, District 7 General Election, 1910
Party	Candidate	Votes	%
Democratic	J. J. Dunnegan	4,065	55.67%
Republican	Levi Baker	3,129	42.85%
Prohibition	James Davison	108	1.48%
Total votes		7,302	100.00%
Democratic hold			

=== District 9 ===
Iowa Senate, District 9 General Election, 1910
Party	Candidate	Votes	%
Republican	La Monte Cowles	3,348	47.17%
Democratic	Fred N. Smith (incumbent)	2,901	40.88%
Socialist	John Wemming	848	11.95%
Total votes		7,097	100.00%
Republican gain from Democratic			

=== District 10 ===
Iowa Senate, District 10 General Election, 1910
Party	Candidate	Votes	%
Republican	S. W. Neal	4,045	55.61%
Democratic	Owen A. Garretson	3,119	42.88%
Prohibition	Harvey Robinson	110	1.51%
Total votes		7,274	100.00%
Republican hold			

=== District 12 ===
Iowa Senate, District 12 Republican Primary Election, 1910
Party	Candidate	Votes	%
Republican	Henry W. Spaulding	1,986	61.51%
Republican	J. J. Terrell	1,243	38.49%
Total votes		3,229	100.00%

Iowa Senate, District 12 General Election, 1910
Party	Candidate	Votes	%
Republican	Henry W. Spaulding	4,825	55.65%
Democratic	J. P. Talley	3,693	42.59%
Prohibition	J. J. Mullen	153	1.76%
Total votes		8,671	100.00%
Republican hold			

=== District 13 ===
Iowa Senate, District 13 Republican Primary Election, 1910
Party	Candidate	Votes	%
Republican	Chester W. Whitmore	1,145	56.15%
Republican	L. H. Young	894	43.85%
Total votes		2,039	100.00%

Iowa Senate, District 13 Democratic Primary Election, 1910
Party	Candidate	Votes	%
Democratic	John F. Webber	990	64.79%
Democratic	C. A. Henry	538	35.21%
Total votes		1,528	100.00%

Iowa Senate, District 13 General Election, 1910
Party	Candidate	Votes	%
Democratic	John F. Webber	3,397	47.85%
Republican	Chester W. Whitmore	3,260	45.92%
Socialist	James McGahey	443	6.24%
Total votes		7,100	100.00%
Democratic hold			

=== District 17 ===
Iowa Senate, District 17 General Election, 1910
Party	Candidate	Votes	%
Republican	A. M. McColl	6,240	67.02%
Democratic	H. H. Crenshaw	3,071	32.98%
Total votes		9,311	100.00%
Republican hold			

=== District 18 ===
Iowa Senate, District 18 Republican Primary Election, 1910
Party	Candidate	Votes	%
Republican	Thomas H. Smith	1,919	58.12%
Republican	C. R. Benedict	1,383	41.88%
Total votes		3,302	100.00%

Iowa Senate, District 18 General Election, 1910
Party	Candidate	Votes	%
Republican	Thomas H. Smith	3,699	50.96%
Democratic	C. F. Swift	3,560	49.04%
Total votes		7,259	100.00%
Republican hold			

=== District 20 ===
Iowa Senate, District 20 General Election, 1910
Party	Candidate	Votes	%
Democratic	A. M. Garrett	4,182	47.37%
Republican	R. S. Johnston	4,083	46.25%
Socialist	Frank J. Coleman	564	6.39%
Total votes		8,829	100.00%
Democratic gain from Republican			

=== District 21 ===
Iowa Senate, District 21 General Election, 1910
Party	Candidate	Votes	%
Democratic	August A. Balluff	5,516	53.13%
Republican	F. D. Letts	4,186	40.32%
Socialist	Michael T. Kennedy	680	6.55%
Total votes		10,382	100.00%
Democratic hold			

=== District 22 ===
Iowa Senate, District 22 General Election, 1910
Party	Candidate	Votes	%
Democratic	John L. Wilson (incumbent)	4,214	55.54%
Republican	Charles W. Beeby	3,374	44.46%
Total votes		7,588	100.00%
Democratic hold			

=== District 29 ===
Iowa Senate, District 29 Republican Primary Election, 1910
Party	Candidate	Votes	%
Republican	Ed. P. Malmberg	1,168	52.49%
Republican	W. R. Cooper	1,057	47.51%
Total votes		2,225	100.00%

Iowa Senate, District 29 General Election, 1910
Party	Candidate	Votes	%
Republican	Ed. P. Malmberg	2,507	50.40%
Democratic	D. K. Mobberly	2,467	49.60%
Total votes		4,974	100.00%
Republican hold			

=== District 30 ===
Iowa Senate, District 30 Republican Primary Election, 1910
Party	Candidate	Votes	%
Republican	John B. Sullivan	5,825	50.90%
Republican	L. J. Kasson	2,361	20.63%
Republican	Charles L. Powell	1,807	15.79%
Republican	Edward A. Lingenfelter	1,451	12.68%
Total votes		11,444	100.00%

Iowa Senate, District 30 General Election, 1910
Party	Candidate	Votes	%
Republican	John B. Sullivan	7,915	52.53%
Democratic	Hubert Utterback	5,698	37.82%
Socialist	G. R. Jones	779	5.17%
Prohibition	D. J. Bunce	676	4.49%
Total votes		15,068	100.00%
Republican hold			

=== District 34 ===
Iowa Senate, District 34 Republican Primary Election, 1910
Party	Candidate	Votes	%
Republican	Carl F. Kuehnle	2,078	56.42%
Republican	George A. Kellogg	1,605	43.58%
Total votes		3,683	100.00%

Iowa Senate, District 34 General Election, 1910
Party	Candidate	Votes	%
Democratic	E. L. Crow	6,184	53.84%
Republican	Carl F. Kuehnle	5,302	46.16%
Total votes		11,486	100.00%
Democratic hold			

=== District 35 ===
Iowa Senate, District 35 Democratic Primary Election, 1910
Party	Candidate	Votes	%
Democratic	N. J. Schrup	2,188	63.26%
Democratic	A. F. Frudden (incumbent)	1,271	36.74%
Total votes		3,459	100.00%

Iowa Senate, District 35 General Election, 1910
Party	Candidate	Votes	%
Democratic	N. J. Schrup	5,485	63.76%
Republican	Joseph H. Trieb	2,682	31.18%
Socialist	L. A. Miller	435	5.06%
Total votes		8,602	100.00%
Democratic hold			

=== District 37 ===
Iowa Senate, District 37 Republican Primary Election, 1910
Party	Candidate	Votes	%
Republican	D. C. Chase	3,657	57.36%
Republican	Charles F. Peterson (incumbent)	2,719	42.64%
Total votes		6,376	100.00%

Iowa Senate, District 37 General Election, 1910
Party	Candidate	Votes	%
Republican	D. C. Chase	5,491	95.48%
Prohibition	S. D. Kennedy	260	4.52%
Total votes		5,751	100.00%
Republican hold			

=== District 38 ===
Iowa Senate, District 38 Republican Primary Election, 1910
Party	Candidate	Votes	%
Republican	H. Jacob Pfeiffer	1,462	56.58%
Republican	William H. Merner	1,122	43.42%
Total votes		2,584	100.00%

Iowa Senate, District 38 General Election, 1910
Party	Candidate	Votes	%
Democratic	S. W. DeWolf (incumbent)	4,767	50.35%
Republican	H. J. Pfeiffer	4,700	49.65%
Total votes		9,467	100.00%
Democratic hold			

=== District 42 ===
Iowa Senate, District 42 General Election, 1910
Party	Candidate	Votes	%
Republican	P. M. Jewell	3,552	51.48%
Democratic	Ben. E. Jewell	3,348	48.52%
Total votes		6,900	100.00%
Republican hold			

=== District 44 ===
Iowa Senate, District 44 Republican Primary Election, 1910
Party	Candidate	Votes	%
Republican	Frederick Schaub	872	36.30%
Republican	W. G. Shaffer	831	34.60%
Republican	Loren W. Inman	699	29.10%
Total votes		2,402	100.00%

Iowa Senate, District 44 General Election, 1910
Party	Candidate	Votes	%
Democratic	John G. Legel	2,937	51.52%
Republican	Frederick Schaub	2,764	48.48%
Total votes		5,701	100.00%
Democratic hold			

=== District 45 ===
Iowa Senate, District 45 General Election, 1910
Party	Candidate	Votes	%
Republican	Asa Lee Ames	4,578	49.98%
Democratic	W. J. Guinn	4,441	48.48%
Socialist	A. A. Miner	141	1.54%
Total votes		9,160	100.00%
Republican hold			

=== District 48 ===
Iowa Senate, District 48 General Election, 1910
Party	Candidate	Votes	%
Republican	Joseph Mattes (incumbent)	4,575	54.57%
Democratic	Peter Stephany	3,808	45.43%
Total votes		8,383	100.00%
Republican hold			

=== District 50 ===
Iowa Senate, District 50 General Election, 1910
Party	Candidate	Votes	%
Republican	Joseph H. Allen (incumbent)	4,549	71.29%
Democratic	F. K. Hawley	1,832	28.71%
Total votes		6,381	100.00%
Republican hold			

== See also ==
- United States elections, 1910
- United States House of Representatives elections in Iowa, 1910
- Elections in Iowa
