= 1950 Iowa Senate election =

- November 7, 1950

22 out of 50 seats in the Iowa State Senate 26 seats needed for a majority
	Majority party	Minority party
Party	Republican	Democratic
Last election	43	7
Seats after	41	9
Seat change	▼2	▲2

The 1950 Iowa State Senate elections took place as part of the biennial 1950 United States elections. Iowa voters elected state senators in 22 of the state senate's 50 districts. State senators serve four-year terms in the Iowa State Senate.

A statewide map of the 50 state Senate districts in the 1950 elections is provided by the Iowa General Assembly here.

The primary election on June 5, 1950, determined which candidates appeared on the November 7, 1950 general election ballot.

Following the previous election, Republicans had control of the Iowa state Senate with 43 seats to Democrats' 7 seats.

To claim control of the chamber from Republicans, the Democrats needed to net 19 Senate seats.

Republicans maintained control of the Iowa State Senate following the 1950 general election with the balance of power shifting to Republicans holding 41 seats and Democrats having 9 seats (a net gain of 2 seats for Democrats).

== Summary of Results ==
- Note: The 28 holdover Senators not up for re-election are not listed on this table.

State Senate District	Incumbent	Party	Incoming Senator	Party
1st	Stanley Lawrence Hart	Rep	Stanley Lawrence Hart	Rep
4th	Pearl Wayland McMurry	Rep	Ray Fletcher	Rep
7th	Earl C. Fishbaugh	Rep	Earl C. Fishbaugh	Rep
9th	William Nielsen Skourup	Rep	Thomas J. Dailey	Dem
10th	Harlan C. Foster	Rep	Carl T. Anderson	Rep
12th	Luke Vittetoe	Rep	Wilbur Cleland Molison	Rep
13th	Elmer K. Bekman	Rep	Elmer K. Bekman	Rep
18th	Jay C. Colburn	Rep	Jay C. Colburn	Rep
20th	Herman B. Lord	Rep	Herman B. Lord	Rep
21st	Frank D. Martin	Rep	Philip T. Hedin	Rep
22nd	Otto H. Henningsen	Rep	Otto H. Henningsen	Rep
29th	Fred Maytag	Rep	James Harold Nesmith	Rep
30th	George M. Faul	Rep	George E. O'Malley	Dem
34th	Eli Clarence Myrland	Rep	Eli Clarence Myrland	Rep
35th	Robert C. Reilly	Dem	Arnold Utzig	Dem
37th	Rex R. Bateson	Rep	Rex R. Bateson	Rep
38th	John Peter Berg	Rep	John Peter Berg	Rep
42nd	William Linnevold	Rep	William Linnevold	Rep
44th	Ralph W. Zastrow	Rep	Ralph W. Zastrow	Rep
45th	Richard V. Leo	Rep	Harry E. Weichman	Rep
48th	Ralph E. Benson	Rep	Alan William Vest	Rep
50th	Jacob Frederick Miller	Rep	R. J. Oltman	Rep

== Detailed Results ==
- NOTE: The 28 districts that did not hold elections in 1950 are not listed here.
- Note: The Iowa Secretary of State's website does not list vote totals for competitive primaries. Only names of candidates in each primary race are provided.

=== District 1 ===
Iowa Senate, District 1 General Election, 1950
Party	Candidate	Votes	%
Republican	Stanley L. Hart (incumbent)	7,617	54.2
Democratic	John M. Kudebeh	6,445	45.8
Total votes		14,062	100.0
Republican hold			

=== District 4 ===
Iowa Senate, District 4 General Election, 1950
Party	Candidate	Votes	%
Republican	Ray Fletcher	6,418	65.4
Democratic	Gordon A. Ward	3,391	34.6
Total votes		9,809	100.0
Republican hold			

=== District 7 ===
Iowa Senate, District 7 General Election, 1950
Party	Candidate	Votes	%
Republican	Earl C. Fishbaugh, Jr. (incumbent)	8,094	65.8
Democratic	Paul V. Nichols	4,213	34.2
Total votes		12,307	100.0
Republican hold			

=== District 9 ===
Iowa Senate, District 9 General Election, 1950
Party	Candidate	Votes	%
Democratic	Thomas J. Dailey	7,168	53.1
Republican	W. N. Skourup (incumbent)	6,321	46.9
Total votes		13,489	100.0
Democratic gain from Republican			

=== District 10 ===
Iowa Senate, District 10 General Election, 1950
Party	Candidate	Votes	%
Republican	Carl T. Anderson	8,867	68.8
Democratic	Gertrude S. Flickinger	4,027	31.2
Total votes		12,894	100.0
Republican hold			

=== District 12 ===
Iowa Senate, District 12 General Election, 1950
Party	Candidate	Votes	%
Republican	Wilbur C. Molison	7,779	59.5
Democratic	Jesse A. Breon	5,297	40.5
Total votes		13,076	100.0
Republican hold			

=== District 13 ===
Iowa Senate, District 13 General Election, 1950
Party	Candidate	Votes	%
Republican	Elmer K. Bekman (incumbent)	7,668	51.5
Democratic	John T. Brady, Jr.	7,227	48.5
Total votes		14,895	100.0
Republican hold			

=== District 18 ===
Iowa Senate, District 18 General Election, 1950
Party	Candidate	Votes	%
Republican	Jay C. Colburn (incumbent)	8,809	100.0
Total votes		8,809	100.0
Republican hold			

=== District 20 ===
Iowa Senate, District 20 General Election, 1950
Party	Candidate	Votes	%
Republican	Herman B. Lord (incumbent)	7,782	57.5
Democratic	William T. Newell	5,762	42.5
Total votes		13,544	100.0
Republican hold			

=== District 21 ===
Iowa Senate, District 21 General Election, 1950
Party	Candidate	Votes	%
Republican	Philip T. Hedin	14,885	57.8
Democratic	Harry Ward	10,881	42.2
Total votes		25,766	100.0
Republican hold			

=== District 22 ===
Iowa Senate, District 22 General Election, 1950
Party	Candidate	Votes	%
Republican	O. H. Henningsen (incumbent)	9,288	58.6
Democratic	Emmett P. Delaney	6,575	41.4
Total votes		15,863	100.0
Republican hold			

=== District 29 ===
Iowa Senate, District 29 General Election, 1950
Party	Candidate	Votes	%
Republican	James H. Nesmith	6,111	58.9
Democratic	Joe Cross	4,267	41.1
Total votes		10,378	100.0
Republican hold			

=== District 30 ===
Iowa Senate, District 30 General Election, 1950
Party	Candidate	Votes	%
Democratic	George E. O'Malley	32,826	52.8
Republican	James P. Irish	29,293	47.2
Total votes		62,119	100.0
Democratic gain from Republican			

=== District 34 ===
Iowa Senate, District 34 General Election, 1950
Party	Candidate	Votes	%
Republican	E. C. Myrland (incumbent)	10,163	56.3
Democratic	William H. Welch	7,890	43.7
Total votes		18,053	100.0
Republican hold			

=== District 35 ===
Iowa Senate, District 35 General Election, 1950
Party	Candidate	Votes	%
Democratic	Arnold Utzig	11,237	55.7
Republican	John H. Ford	8,941	44.3
Total votes		20,178	100.0
Democratic hold			

=== District 37 ===
Iowa Senate, District 37 General Election, 1950
Party	Candidate	Votes	%
Republican	R. R. Bateson (incumbent)	12,184	68.3
Democratic	Rodney Urdahl	5,660	31.7
Total votes		17,844	100.0
Republican hold			

=== District 38 ===
Iowa Senate, District 38 General Election, 1950
Party	Candidate	Votes	%
Republican	John P. Berg (incumbent)	20,084	62.2
Democratic	M. H. Kelly	12,216	37.8
Total votes		32,300	100.0
Republican hold			

=== District 42 ===
Iowa Senate, District 42 General Election, 1950
Party	Candidate	Votes	%
Republican	William Linnevold (incumbent)	7,333	54.6
Democratic	George Mikesh	6,097	45.4
Total votes		13,430	100.0
Republican hold			

=== District 44 ===
Iowa Senate, District 44 General Election, 1950
Party	Candidate	Votes	%
Republican	Ralph W. Zastrow (incumbent)	6,583	55.0
Democratic	Henry F. Hauth	5,394	45.0
Total votes		11,977	100.0
Republican hold			

=== District 45 ===
Iowa Senate, District 45 General Election, 1950
Party	Candidate	Votes	%
Republican	Harry E. Weichman	8,467	59.7
Democratic	Fred J. Hushak	5,715	40.3
Total votes		14,182	100.0
Republican hold			

=== District 48 ===
Iowa Senate, District 48 General Election, 1950
Party	Candidate	Votes	%
Republican	Alan Vest	9,828	57.6
Democratic	Francis L. Cudahy	7,221	42.4
Total votes		17,049	100.0
Republican hold			

=== District 50 ===
Iowa Senate, District 50 General Election, 1950
Party	Candidate	Votes	%
Republican	R. J. Oltman	9,094	61.0
Democratic	George Grau	5,824	39.0
Total votes		14,918	100.0
Republican hold			

== See also ==
- United States elections, 1950
- United States House of Representatives elections in Iowa, 1950
- Elections in Iowa
