= 1930 Iowa Senate election =

- November 4, 1930

21 out of 50 seats in the Iowa State Senate 26 seats needed for a majority
	Majority party	Minority party
Party	Republican	Democratic
Last election	48	2
Seats after	44	6
Seat change	▼4	▲4
- Results; Democratic gain Republican gain Republican hold

The 1930 Iowa State Senate elections took place as part of the biennial 1930 United States elections. Iowa voters elected state senators in 21 of the state senate's 50 districts. State senators serve four-year terms in the Iowa State Senate.

A statewide map of the 50 state Senate districts in the 1930 elections is provided by the Iowa General Assembly here.

The primary election on June 2, 1930, determined which candidates appeared on the November 4, 1930 general election ballot.

Following the previous election, Republicans had control of the Iowa state Senate with 48 seats to Democrats' 2 seats.

To claim control of the chamber from Republicans, the Democrats needed to net 24 Senate seats. (Note: It was impossible for Democrats to flip control of the Iowa state Senate in the 1930 election given that only 21 seats were up for election and 24 flips were needed for Democrats to take control.)

Republicans maintained control of the Iowa State Senate following the 1930 general election with the balance of power shifting to Republicans holding 44 seats and Democrats having 6 seats (a net gain of 4 seats for Democrats).

== Summary of Results ==
- Note: The 29 holdover Senators not up for re-election are not listed on this table.

State Senate District	Incumbent	Party	Elected Senator	Party
1st	Joseph R. Frailey	Rep	Joseph R. Frailey	Rep
7th	Denver Loring Wilson	Rep	Frank Iradelle Coykendall (Note: Coykendall won the 1930 general election in district 7 as a Democrat, but would switch parties to Republican once being sworn into the Iowa General Assembly.)	Rep
9th	Clyde Hamilton Topping	Rep	Clyde Hamilton Topping	Rep
10th	William Carden	Rep	William Carden	Rep
12th	Frank M. Beatty	Rep	Frank M. Beatty	Rep
13th	Frank B. Shane	Rep	Roy E. Stevens	Dem
18th	Charles D. Booth	Rep	Charles D. Booth	Rep
20th	Ralph U. Thompson	Dem	Edwin R. Hicklin	Rep
21st	David W. Kimberly	Rep	David W. Kimberly	Rep
22nd	John O. Shaff	Rep	Harold L. Irwin	Dem
29th	A. H. Bergman	Rep	Oliver Perry Myers	Dem
30th	George Allison Wilson	Rep	George Allison Wilson	Rep
34th	Oliver P. Bennett	Rep	Oliver P. Bennett	Rep
35th	Otto F. Lange	Rep	Matt D. Cooney	Dem
37th	Oscar Ulstad	Rep	Irving H. Knudson	Rep
38th	Charles Theodore Rogers	Rep	Edward J. Wenner	Rep
42nd	William Henry Klemme	Rep	William Henry Klemme	Rep
44th	Ansel Taylor Brookins	Rep	Lafe Hill	Rep
45th	Samuel Albert Brush	Rep	Harry Cook White	Dem
48th	John Grant Merritt	Rep	Lewis Thomas Quirk	Rep
50th	Fred Cramer Gilchrist	Rep	William Robert Ritchie	Rep

== Detailed Results ==
- NOTE: The 29 districts that did not hold elections in 1930 are not listed here.
- Note: If a district does not list a primary, then that district did not have a competitive primary (i.e., there may have only been one candidate file for that district).

=== District 1 ===
Iowa Senate, District 1 General Election, 1930
Party	Candidate	Votes	%
Republican	Joe R. Frailey (incumbent)	6,562	55.7
Democratic	J. O. Boyd	5,209	44.3
Total votes		11,771	100.0
Republican hold			

=== District 7 ===
- Though Coykendall won the general election running as a Democrat, he switched parties to Republican as he was sworn into the Iowa State Senate.

Iowa Senate, District 7 Republican Primary Election, 1930
Party	Candidate	Votes	%
Republican	Denver L. Wilson (incumbent)	2,059	37.8
Republican	Frank I. Coykendall	1,855	34.0
Republican	Adams	1,534	28.2
Total votes		5,448	100.0

Iowa Senate, District 7 General Election, 1930
Party	Candidate	Votes	%
Democratic	Frank I. Coykendall	6,021	57.3
Republican	Denver L. Wilson (incumbent)	4,490	42.7
Total votes		10,511	100.0
Republican hold			

=== District 9 ===
Iowa Senate, District 9 General Election, 1930
Party	Candidate	Votes	%
Republican	Clyde H. Topping (incumbent)	5,020	54.9
Democratic	Thomas J. Smith	4,121	45.1
Total votes		9,141	100.0
Republican hold			

=== District 10 ===
Iowa Senate, District 10 General Election, 1930
Party	Candidate	Votes	%
Republican	William A. Carden (incumbent)	6,363	100.0
Total votes		6,363	100.0
Republican hold			

=== District 12 ===
Iowa Senate, District 12 General Election, 1930
Party	Candidate	Votes	%
Republican	Frank M. Beatty (incumbent)	7,156	100.0
Total votes		7,156	100.0
Republican hold			

=== District 13 ===
Iowa Senate, District 13 Republican Primary Election, 1930
Party	Candidate	Votes	%
Republican	Frank Shane (incumbent)	2,290	47.2
Republican	Bluhm	2,017	41.6
Republican	Bradley	542	11.2
Total votes		4,849	100.0

Iowa Senate, District 13 General Election, 1930
Party	Candidate	Votes	%
Democratic	R. E. Stevens	4,963	51.1
Republican	Frank Shane (incumbent)	4,742	48.9
Total votes		9,705	100.0
Democratic gain from Republican			

=== District 18 ===
Iowa Senate, District 18 General Election, 1930
Party	Candidate	Votes	%
Republican	Charles D. Booth (incumbent)	6,655	100.0
Total votes		6,655	100.0
Republican hold			

=== District 20 ===
Iowa Senate, District 20 General Election, 1930
Party	Candidate	Votes	%
Republican	E. R. Hicklin	5,650	100.0
Total votes		5,650	100.0
Republican gain from Democratic			

=== District 21 ===
Iowa Senate, District 21 General Election, 1930
Party	Candidate	Votes	%
Republican	D. W. Kimberly (incumbent)	8,736	100.0
Total votes		8,736	100.0
Republican hold			

=== District 22 ===
Iowa Senate, District 22 General Election, 1930
Party	Candidate	Votes	%
Democratic	H. L. Irwin	8,287	56.8
Republican	J. O. Shaff (incumbent)	6,302	43.2
Total votes		14,589	100.0
Democratic gain from Republican			

=== District 29 ===
Iowa Senate, District 29 Republican Primary Election, 1930
Party	Candidate	Votes	%
Republican	A. H. Bergman (incumbent)	2,329	62.9
Republican	Morgan	1,375	37.1
Total votes		3,704	100.0

Iowa Senate, District 29 Democratic Primary Election, 1930
Party	Candidate	Votes	%
Democratic	O. P. Myers	285	63.3
Democratic	Sellman	165	36.7
Total votes		450	100.0

Iowa Senate, District 29 General Election, 1930
Party	Candidate	Votes	%
Democratic	O. P. Myers	3,846	57.0
Republican	A. H. Bergman (incumbent)	2,896	43.0
Total votes		6,742	100.0
Democratic gain from Republican			

=== District 30 ===
Iowa Senate, District 30 General Election, 1930
Party	Candidate	Votes	%
Republican	George A. Wilson (incumbent)	17,036	100.0
Total votes		17,036	100.0
Republican hold			

=== District 34 ===
Iowa Senate, District 34 General Election, 1930
Party	Candidate	Votes	%
Republican	O. P. Bennett (incumbent)	8,936	51.8
Democratic	George L. Harrison	8,306	48.2
Total votes		17,242	100.0
Republican hold			

=== District 35 ===
Iowa Senate, District 35 Democratic Primary Election, 1930
Party	Candidate	Votes	%
Democratic	Matt D. Cooney	2,990	57.2
Democratic	Swift	2,235	42.8
Total votes		5,225	100.0

Iowa Senate, District 35 General Election, 1930
Party	Candidate	Votes	%
Democratic	Mathew D. Cooney	6,587	55.4
Republican	J. Allen Wallis	5,307	44.6
Total votes		11,894	100.0
Democratic gain from Republican			

=== District 37 ===
Iowa Senate, District 37 Republican Primary Election, 1930
Party	Candidate	Votes	%
Republican	Irving H. Knudson	5,539	47.3
Republican	Needham	3,771	32.2
Republican	William Schmedika	2,392	20.5
Total votes		11,702	100.0

Iowa Senate, District 37 General Election, 1930
Party	Candidate	Votes	%
Republican	Irving H. Knudson	7,205	100.0
Total votes		7,205	100.0
Republican hold			

=== District 38 ===
Iowa Senate, District 38 Republican Primary Election, 1930
Party	Candidate	Votes	%
Republican	Edward J. Wenner	4,462	36.9
Republican	Charles Theodore Rogers (incumbent)	4,177	34.5
Republican	Howard	3,457	28.6
Total votes		12,096	100.0

Iowa Senate, District 38 General Election, 1930
Party	Candidate	Votes	%
Republican	Edward J. Wenner	8,788	100.0
Total votes		8,788	100.0
Republican hold			

=== District 42 ===
Iowa Senate, District 42 Republican Primary Election, 1930
Party	Candidate	Votes	%
Republican	William H. Klemme (incumbent)	2,374	45.4
Republican	Hook	1,882	36.0
Republican	Bailey	971	18.6
Total votes		5,227	100.0

Iowa Senate, District 42 General Election, 1930
Party	Candidate	Votes	%
Republican	William H. Klemme (incumbent)	6,241	100.0
Total votes		6,241	100.0
Republican hold			

=== District 44 ===
Iowa Senate, District 44 Republican Primary Election, 1930
Party	Candidate	Votes	%
Republican	Lafe Hill	2,217	36.7
Republican	Ansel Taylor Brookins (incumbent)	2,059	34.1
Republican	Kepple	1,762	29.2
Total votes		6,038	100.0

Iowa Senate, District 44 General Election, 1930
Party	Candidate	Votes	%
Republican	Lafe Hill	4,839	52.9
Democratic	T. C. Kelley	4,308	47.1
Total votes		9,147	100.0
Republican hold			

=== District 45 ===
Iowa Senate, District 45 Republican Primary Election, 1930
Party	Candidate	Votes	%
Republican	W. J. Breakenridge	1,766	30.6
Republican	Strippel	1,620	28.0
Republican	R. V. Leo (Note: Despite coming in third in the Republican Primary, Leo would run in the general election as an Independent.)	1,411	24.4
Republican	Samuel Albert Brush (incumbent)	980	17.0
Total votes		5,777	100.0

Iowa Senate, District 45 General Election, 1930
Party	Candidate	Votes	%
Democratic	H. C. White	3,131	38.5
Independent	R. V. Leo	2,946	36.2
Republican	W. J. Breakenridge	2,053	25.3
Total votes		8,130	100.0
Democratic gain from Republican			

=== District 48 ===
Iowa Senate, District 48 Republican Primary Election, 1930
Party	Candidate	Votes	%
Republican	L. T. Quirk	2,793	40.4
Republican	John Grant Merritt (incumbent)	2,688	38.9
Republican	Piper	1,434	20.7
Total votes		6,915	100.0

Iowa Senate, District 48 General Election, 1930
Party	Candidate	Votes	%
Republican	L. T. Quirk	6,317	100.0
Total votes		6,317	100.0
Republican hold			

=== District 50 ===
Iowa Senate, District 50 Republican Primary Election, 1930
Party	Candidate	Votes	%
Republican	W. R. Ritchie	5,116	51.8
Republican	Van Alstine	4,762	48.2
Total votes		9,878	100.0

Iowa Senate, District 50 General Election, 1930
Party	Candidate	Votes	%
Republican	W. R. Ritchie	6,593	100.0
Total votes		6,593	100.0
Republican hold			

== See also ==
- United States elections, 1930
- United States House of Representatives elections in Iowa, 1930
- Elections in Iowa
