= 1926 Iowa Senate election =

- November 2, 1926

21 out of 50 seats in the Iowa State Senate 26 seats needed for a majority
	Majority party	Minority party	Third party
Party	Republican	Democratic	Independent
Last election	45	4	1
Seats after	49	1	0
Seat change	▲4	▼3	▼1
- Results Republican gain Republican hold

The 1926 Iowa State Senate elections took place as part of the biennial 1926 United States elections. Iowa voters elected state senators in 21 of the state senate's 50 districts. State senators serve four-year terms in the Iowa State Senate.

A statewide map of the 50 state Senate districts in the 1926 elections is provided by the Iowa General Assembly here.

The primary election on June 7, 1926, determined which candidates appeared on the November 2, 1926 general election ballot.

Following the previous election, Republicans had control of the Iowa state Senate with 45 seats, the Democrats had 4 seats, and 1 seat was held by an independent.

Republicans maintained control of the Iowa State Senate following the 1926 general election with the balance of power shifting to Republicans holding 49 seats and Democrats having 1 seat (a net gain of 4 seats for Republicans). Like 6 years prior, Democrats lost every district up for election, including four held by them. After the election, Lloyd Ellis of the 3rd Senate District was the only Democrat in the chamber.

== Summary of Results ==
- Note: The 29 holdover Senators not up for re-election are not listed on this table.

State Senate District	Incumbent	Party	Elected Senator	Party
1st	Isaac N. Snook	Dem	Joseph R. Frailey	Rep
7th	Sylvester Calvin Rees	Rep	Denver Loring Wilson	Rep
9th	Edward William Romkey	Rep	Clyde Hamilton Topping	Rep
10th	James L. Brookhart	Rep	William Carden	Rep
12th	Theodore Charles Cessna	Rep	Frank M. Beatty	Rep
13th	Frank B. Shane	Rep	Frank B. Shane	Rep
18th	Julius A. Nelson	Rep	Charles D. Booth	Rep
20th	Jonas DeMoss Buser	Rep	Samuel Franklin Wilson	Rep
21st	David W. Kimberly	Rep	David W. Kimberly	Rep
22nd	John O. Shaff	Rep	John O. Shaff	Rep
29th	A. H. Bergman	Rep	A. H. Bergman	Rep
30th	William J. Goodwin	Rep	George Allison Wilson	Rep
34th	Andrew Jackson Shinn	Rep	Andrew Jackson Shinn	Rep
35th	Bernard J. Horchem	Dem	Otto F. Lange	Rep
37th	William Schmedika	Ind	Oscar Ulstad	Rep
38th	Melville L. Bowman	Rep	Arch Wallace McFarlane	Rep
42nd	Carl Webster Reed	Rep	William Henry Klemme	Rep
44th	Ansel Taylor Brookins	Rep	Ansel Taylor Brookins	Rep
45th	Harry Cook White	Dem	Samuel Albert Brush	Rep
48th	George B. Perkins	Rep	John Grant Merritt	Rep
50th	Fred Cramer Gilchrist	Rep	Fred Cramer Gilchrist	Rep

== Detailed Results ==
- NOTE: The 29 districts that did not hold elections in 1926 are not listed here.
- Note: If a district does not list a primary, then that district did not have a competitive primary (i.e., there may have only been one candidate file for that district).

=== District 1 ===
Iowa Senate, District 1 General Election, 1926
Party	Candidate	Votes	%
Republican	Joseph R. Frailey	5,614	55.82%
Democratic	H. J. Kennedy	4,444	44.18%
Total votes		10,058	100.00%
Republican gain from Democratic			

=== District 7 ===
Iowa Senate, District 7 Republican Primary Election, 1926
Party	Candidate	Votes	%
Republican	Denver L. Wilson	2,990	52.12%
Republican	T. E. Powers	2,747	47.88%
Total votes		5,737	100.00%

Iowa Senate, District 7 General Election, 1926
Party	Candidate	Votes	%
Republican	Denver L. Wilson	5,302	58.62%
Democratic	M. A. Krasehel	3,742	41.38%
Total votes		9,044	100.00%
Republican hold			

=== District 9 ===
Iowa Senate, District 9 Republican Primary Election, 1926
Party	Candidate	Votes	%
Republican	Clyde H. Topping	2,989	62.04%
Republican	E. W. Romkey (incumbent)	1,829	37.96%
Total votes		4,818	100.00%

Iowa Senate, District 9 General Election, 1926
Party	Candidate	Votes	%
Republican	Clyde H. Topping	4,693	59.68%
Democratic	W. D. Dodds	3,171	40.32%
Total votes		7,864	100.00%
Republican hold			

=== District 10 ===
Iowa Senate, District 10 Republican Primary Election, 1926
Party	Candidate	Votes	%
Republican	William Carden	4,723	60.71%
Republican	J. L. Brookhart (incumbent)	3,057	39.29%
Total votes		7,780	100.00%

Iowa Senate, District 10 General Election, 1926
Party	Candidate	Votes	%
Republican	William Carden	6,387	64.18%
Democratic	Herman E. Elgar	3,564	35.82%
Total votes		9,951	100.00%
Republican hold			

=== District 12 ===
Iowa Senate, District 12 Republican Primary Election, 1926
Party	Candidate	Votes	%
Republican	Frank M. Beatty	4,029	57.53%
Republican	Robert J. Shaw	2,974	42.47%
Total votes		7,003	100.00%

Iowa Senate, District 12 General Election, 1926
Party	Candidate	Votes	%
Republican	Frank M. Beatty	7,963	100.00%
Total votes		7,963	100.00%
Republican hold			

=== District 13 ===
Iowa Senate, District 13 General Election, 1926
Party	Candidate	Votes	%
Republican	Frank Shane (incumbent)	6,067	64.33%
Democratic	J. E. Hull	3,364	35.67%
Total votes		9,431	100.00%
Republican hold			

=== District 18 ===
Iowa Senate, District 18 General Election, 1926
Party	Candidate	Votes	%
Republican	Charles D. Booth	5,651	55.18%
Democratic	C. A. Zellmer	4,590	44.82%
Total votes		10,241	100.00%
Republican hold			

=== District 20 ===
Iowa Senate, District 20 Republican Primary Election, 1926
Party	Candidate	Votes	%
Republican	Sam F. Wilson	3,393	52.97%
Republican	Jonas D. Buser (incumbent)	3,012	47.03%
Total votes		6,405	100.00%

Iowa Senate, District 20 General Election, 1926
Party	Candidate	Votes	%
Republican	Sam F. Wilson	4,819	51.52%
Independent	Jonas Buser (Note: After losing the Republican primary, Senator Buser ran in the general election as an independent.) (incumbent)	2,659	28.43%
Democratic	Henry Wildasin	1,876	20.06%
Total votes		9,354	100.00%
Republican hold			

=== District 21 ===
Iowa Senate, District 21 General Election, 1926
Party	Candidate	Votes	%
Republican	D. W. Kimberly (incumbent)	8,778	100.00%
Total votes		8,778	100.00%
Republican hold			

=== District 22 ===
Iowa Senate, District 22 General Election, 1926
Party	Candidate	Votes	%
Republican	J. O. Shaff (incumbent)	7,076	58.40%
Democratic	John W. Smith	5,041	41.60%
Total votes		12,117	100.00%
Republican hold			

=== District 29 ===
Iowa Senate, District 29 Republican Primary Election, 1926
Party	Candidate	Votes	%
Republican	A. H. Bergman (incumbent)	2,578	65.07%
Republican	Richard M. Burroughs	1,384	34.93%
Total votes		3,962	100.00%

Iowa Senate, District 29 Democratic Primary Election, 1926
Party	Candidate	Votes	%
Democratic	O. P. Meyers	386	59.38%
Democratic	J. E. Craven	264	40.62%
Total votes		650	100.00%

Iowa Senate, District 29 General Election, 1926
Party	Candidate	Votes	%
Republican	A. H. Bergman (incumbent)	3,477	51.19%
Democratic	O. P. Meyers	3,315	48.81%
Total votes		6,792	100.00%
Republican hold			

=== District 30 ===
Iowa Senate, District 30 Republican Primary Election, 1926
Party	Candidate	Votes	%
Republican	George A. Wilson	7,713	33.35%
Republican	Guy A. Miller	5,110	22.10%
Republican	E. A. Lingenfelter	4,469	19.32%
Republican	John B. Hammond	2,972	12.85%
Republican	David W. Fletcher	2,862	12.38%
Total votes		23,126	100.00%

Iowa Senate, District 30 General Election, 1926
Party	Candidate	Votes	%
Republican	George A. Wilson	16,241	84.23%
Democratic	C. N. O. Leir	3,040	15.77%
Total votes		19,281	100.00%
Republican hold			

=== District 34 ===
Iowa Senate, District 34 Republican Primary Election, 1926
Party	Candidate	Votes	%
Republican	A. J. Shinn (incumbent)	2,884	46.08%
Republican	P. J. Klinker	2,213	35.36%
Republican	L. A. Longman	1,162	18.57%
Total votes		6,259	100.00%

Iowa Senate, District 34 Democratic Primary Election, 1926
Party	Candidate	Votes	%
Democratic	Levi McNeill	1,061	50.60%
Democratic	George L. Harrison	1,036	49.40%
Total votes		2,097	100.00%

Iowa Senate, District 34 General Election, 1926
Party	Candidate	Votes	%
Republican	A. J. Shinn (incumbent)	8,421	52.36%
Democratic	Levi McNeill	7,662	47.64%
Total votes		16,083	100.00%
Republican hold			

=== District 35 ===
Iowa Senate, District 35 General Election, 1926
Party	Candidate	Votes	%
Republican	Otto F. Lange	6,153	51.19%
Democratic	B. J. Horchem (incumbent)	5,867	48.81%
Total votes		12,020	100.00%
Republican gain from Democratic			

=== District 37 ===
Iowa Senate, District 37 Republican Primary Election, 1926
Party	Candidate	Votes	%
Republican	Oscar Ulstad	4,316	37.07%
Republican	W. F. Cole	3,955	33.97%
Republican	William Schmedika (Note: Senator Schmedika was an independent politician who ran for re-election as a Republican.) (incumbent)	3,371	28.96%
Total votes		11,642	100.00%

Iowa Senate, District 37 General Election, 1926
Party	Candidate	Votes	%
Republican	Oscar Ulstad	8,191	86.79%
Democratic	J. L. Peppers	1,247	13.21%
Total votes		9,438	100.00%
Republican gain from Independent			

=== District 38 ===
Iowa Senate, District 38 Republican Primary Election, 1926
Party	Candidate	Votes	%
Republican	Arch W. McFarlane	6,042	49.19%
Republican	H. A. Willoughby	4,794	39.03%
Republican	W. Minor Lemon	1,448	11.79%
Total votes		12,284	100.00%

Iowa Senate, District 38 General Election, 1926
Party	Candidate	Votes	%
Republican	Arch W. McFarlane	8,686	71.63%
Democratic	Sherman W. DeWolf	3,440	28.37%
Total votes		12,126	100.00%
Republican hold			

=== District 42 ===
Iowa Senate, District 42 Republican Primary Election, 1926
Party	Candidate	Votes	%
Republican	William H. Klemme	3,308	57.19%
Republican	O. Gilbertson	2,476	42.81%
Total votes		5,784	100.00%

Iowa Senate, District 42 General Election, 1926
Party	Candidate	Votes	%
Republican	William H. Klemme	6,549	100.00%
Total votes		6,549	100.00%
Republican hold			

=== District 44 ===
Iowa Senate, District 44 Republican Primary Election, 1926
Party	Candidate	Votes	%
Republican	A. T. Brookins (incumbent)	3,868	72.46%
Republican	W. C. Kingfield	1,470	27.54%
Total votes		5,338	100.00%

Iowa Senate, District 44 General Election, 1926
Party	Candidate	Votes	%
Republican	A. T. Brookins (incumbent)	5,269	58.34%
Democratic	Grover H. Galvin	3,762	41.66%
Total votes		9,031	100.00%
Republican hold			

=== District 45 ===
Iowa Senate, District 45 Republican Primary Election, 1926
Party	Candidate	Votes	%
Republican	S. A. Brush	3,736	58.79%
Republican	Werner Strippel	2,619	41.21%
Total votes		6,355	100.00%

Iowa Senate, District 45 General Election, 1926
Party	Candidate	Votes	%
Republican	S. A. Brush	7,412	100.00%
Total votes		7,412	100.00%
Republican gain from Democratic			

=== District 48 ===
Iowa Senate, District 48 Republican Primary Election, 1926
Party	Candidate	Votes	%
Republican	J. G. Merritt	3,708	47.15%
Republican	George L. Miller	2,223	28.27%
Republican	Paul N. Robson	1,933	24.58%
Total votes		7,864	100.00%

Iowa Senate, District 48 General Election, 1926
Party	Candidate	Votes	%
Republican	J. G. Merritt	7,610	100.00%
Total votes		7,610	100.00%
Republican hold			

=== District 50 ===
Iowa Senate, District 50 General Election, 1926
Party	Candidate	Votes	%
Republican	F. C. Gilchrist (incumbent)	7,669	100.00%
Total votes		7,669	100.00%
Republican hold			

== See also ==
- United States elections, 1926
- United States House of Representatives elections in Iowa, 1926
- Elections in Iowa
