= Senator Mowry =

Senator Mowry may refer to:

- John L. Mowry (1905–1995), Iowa State Senate
- Ross Mowry (1882–1957), Iowa State Senate

== See also ==
- Harold Mowery (1930–2014), Pennsylvania State Senate
