= Thomas Henry Smith =

Thomas Henry Smith may refer to:

- Thomas Henry Smith (Canadian politician) (1848–1919), English-born Canadian politician from Manitoba
- Thomas Henry Smith (American politician) (1854–1936), American politician from Iowa
- Thomas Henry Smith (poet) (1824–1907), New Zealand poet and judge
- Thomas H. Smith (1830–?), Irish-Australian footballer
