= Charles Malone =

Charles Malone may refer to:

- Charles E. Malone (1881–1945), American politician in Iowa
- Charles R. Malone (born c. 1954), chief justice of the Supreme Court of Alabama
- Charley Malone (1910–1992), American football player
