= Crookham =

Crookham may refer to:

- Crookham, Berkshire
- Crookham, Northumberland
- Church Crookham, Hampshire
- Crookham Village, Hampshire
- Greenham and Crookham Commons

== Surname ==
- Charles Crookham (1923–2004), American lawyer and judge from Oregon
- J. A. L. Crookham (1817–1901), American politician and judge from Iowa
