= Senator Voorhees (disambiguation) =

Daniel W. Voorhees (1827–1897) was a U.S. Senator from Indiana from 1877 to 1897. Senator Voorhees may also refer to:

- Foster McGowan Voorhees (1856–1927), New Jersey State Senate
- John Cramer Voorhees (1865–1918), Iowa State Senate
