= Edward Speer White =

American politician (1871–1965)

Edward Speer White (October 27, 1871 – September 1, 1965) was an American lawyer and politician.

White was born in Benton County, Iowa, on October 27, 1871. After graduating from Harlan High School, White earned a Bachelor of Arts from the University of Iowa College of Law, and obtained a Bachelor of Law at the University of Michigan Law School.

Between 1989 and 1901, White was the superintendent of schools in Harlan, Iowa. He was also the Shelby County attorney for three terms, and led the county branch of the Republican Party for several terms. White attended the 1920 Republican National Convention as a delegate, and was a member of the Electoral College during the 1944 presidential election. From 1945 to 1947, White served in the Iowa Senate for District 18, completing the term of Frank Pelzer, who had died in office.

White died at the age of 93 on September 1, 1965.
