= Liz Mathis =

American politician and journalist (born 1958)

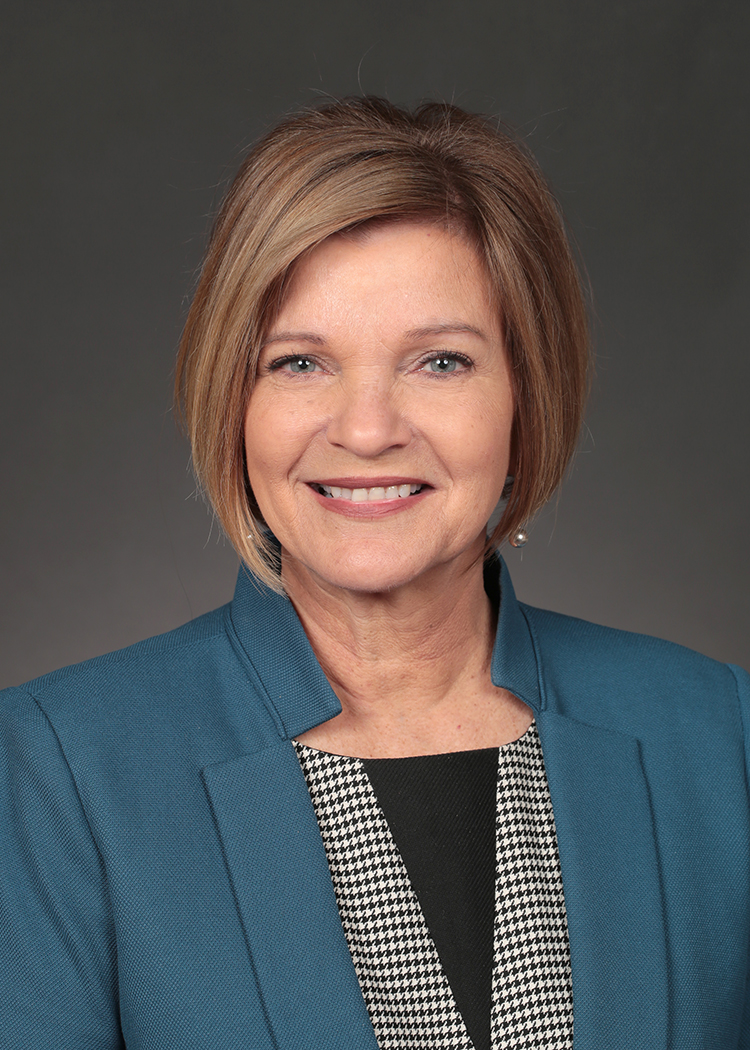

Member of the Iowa Senate from the 34th district
- Incumbent
- Assumed office November 21, 2011
- Preceded by: Swati Dandekar
- Constituency: 18th (2011–2013)

Personal details
- Born: Elizabeth Ann Rumann; 1958 (age 67–68) DeWitt, Iowa, U.S.
- Party: Democratic
- Spouse: Mark Mathis
- Education: University of Iowa (BA)
- Website: Campaign website

Elizabeth Ann Mathis (née Rumann, 1958) is an American politician, non-profit executive and former broadcast journalist who has served as an Iowa State Senator since 2011. A member of the Democratic Party, she was elected to represent the 18th district in a November 2011 special election and re-elected to the redrawn 34th district in 2012. Mathis was the Democratic nominee for Iowa's 2nd congressional district (1st district at the time of the campaign) in 2022, losing the general election to incumbent Republican Ashley Hinson.

Mathis, who co-chairs the Administration and Regulation Appropriations Subcommittee, serves on Education, Commerce, Economic Growth, Human Resources and full Appropriations committees. She is also the legislative liaison to the Iowa Department of Public Health. Mathis is the chief community officer for a child welfare and juvenile justice agency, Four Oaks.

== Early life and education ==
Mathis was born on a farm in rural DeWitt, Iowa, in 1958. Her mother, Mary Eleanor Rumann, was a schoolteacher and nurse who served in World War II. Her father, James Edward Rumann, was a farmer and school board member who also served in the war. Mathis received her bachelor's degree in 1980 from the University of Iowa, where she double-majored in broadcasting and film and in journalism. To put herself through college, she worked weekends as a production assistant at WMT-TV.

== Career ==
=== Journalism ===
After graduating from college, she joined KWWL as a reporter and anchor, doing "a little bit of everything" from their newly opened Cedar Rapids bureau. Soon after joining the station, she moved to Waterloo to become an evening co-anchor alongside Ron Steele at the age of 23. Taking a break from broadcasting, she joined the faculty of Wartburg College in Waverly, Iowa in August 1996, where she taught electronic media. In 1998 she became a news anchor, reporter and producer at KCRG-TV, where she remained for nine years. In July 2007, she retired from broadcasting to become vice president for community relations for Horizons—A Family Service Alliance, a non-profit counseling and assistance agency in Cedar Rapids. She later became chief community officer for Four Oaks.

=== Iowa Senate ===
Mathis was nominated in September 2011 by the Iowa Democratic Party to run for the state senate seat vacated by Democrat Swati Dandekar. Mathis faced Republican candidate Cindy Golding in a special election held on November 8, 2011. The election was politically significant for the state, as the Republican Party controlled the Iowa governorship and General Assembly, and the Democrats stood to lose their one-seat majority in the state Senate. Mathis won the election by 56 to 44 percent and was sworn in on November 21, 2011. She sat on the Commerce, Economic Growth, Human Resources, and Ways and Means committees.

She was challenged for re-election in November 2012 by Ryan Flood, a libertarian Super PAC director and financial services representative. She ran in the newly drawn 34th district, and largely agreed with her challenger on lowering Iowa's property taxes and opposing a gas tax increase. Neither candidate took a stance on a proposed casino in nearby Cedar Rapids. Mathis was elected with around 60 percent of the vote.

=== U.S. House campaign ===
In 2021, Mathis announced her intent to run for Iowa's 2nd congressional district in the 2022 election. She lost the general election to incumbent Republican Ashley Hinson.

== Personal life ==
She is married to Mark Mathis III, who owns the advertising agency ME&V. They live outside the city of Robins, and have two children, Mark IV and Mary Fran. Mathis has also taught part-time at the University of Iowa's School of Journalism and Mass Communication, and remains a member of the Wartburg Board of Regents.

== See also ==
- KWWL (TV)
- KCRG-TV

Iowa Senate
Preceded by Swati Dandekar	Member of the Iowa Senate from the 18th district 2011–2013	Succeeded by Janet Petersen
Preceded by Dick Dearden	Member of the Iowa Senate from the 34th district 2013–present	Incumbent
