= J. A. L. Crookham =

American politician (1817–1901)

John Abbott Lake Crookham (30 October 1817 – 2 May 1901) was an American politician.

Crookham was born in Jackson County, Ohio, on 30 October 1817, to parents George L. Crookham and Sarah Lake. Two months before he turned eighteen, Crookham left his native Ohio for work in Kanawha, Iowa. He sent out for Oskaloosa, Iowa in August 1845, after selling land he had owned in Ohio and Illinois. Soon after reaching Oskaloosa, Crookham moved near Burlington, Illinois, where he taught school and studied law for a full year. He began his legal career in Lee County, Iowa, and resettled permanently in Oskaloosa by August 1847. Between 1851 and 1855, Crookham held a judgeship in Mahaska County. In March 1855, Crookham was appointed to serve on a commission coveneved by James W. Grimes to select a location for Iowa's capital city. When Des Moines was chosen, Crookham drove a stake to mark the area in which the Iowa State Capitol would be built. He won election to the Iowa Senate in 1863 and served through 1868 as a Republican legislator from District 18. Crookham died on 2 May 1901.
