= John L. Mowry =

American politician (1905–1995)

John L. Mowry (December 15, 1905 – November 1, 1995) was an American politician.

== Early life and education ==
A native of Baxter, Iowa, John Mowry was born on December 15, 1905 to parents William Mowry and Grace Lindsay Conn. Mowry graduated from Marshalltown High School in 1924, then enrolled at Ohio State University before transferring to the University of Iowa. After completing his bachelor's degree in 1928, Mowry earned a Juris Doctor at Iowa's College of Law in 1930.

== Federal Bureau of Investigation and military career ==
Mowry was a special agent of the Federal Bureau of Investigation from 1930 to 1934, assigned to investigate racketeering. Following Thomas E. Dewey's appointment as special prosecutor in 1935, Mowry became special agent responsible for Manhattan, serving through 1938. Between 1941 and 1944, Mowry served stateside in the United States Army Air Forces, and was stationed in Philadelphia. The following year, he served a term as national president of the Society of Former Agents of the FBI.

== Political career in Iowa ==
Mowry began a four-year term as Marshall County attorney in 1938, and was mayor of Marshalltown from 1950 to 1955. Between 1957 and 1965, Mowry was a Republican legislator for District 51 of the Iowa House of Representatives. In 1963 and 1964, he was house majority leader. Mowry returned to the state house, again for District 51, from 1967 to 1969. He was subsequently elected to Iowa Senate from 1969 to 1973, serving two years in each in District 26 and District 18 due to redistricting.

In 1961, Mowry opposed a bill allowing for Iowa Supreme Court and district court judges to be gubernatorial appointments, rather than popularly elected.

== Personal life and death ==
Mowry's uncle Ross also served in the Iowa Legislature. John Mowry married Irene Lounsberry, a daughter of fellow lawyer Harold C. Lounsberry, on June 7, 1941. The couple had one daughter, Madelyn. He died at the Marshalltown Medical and Surgical Center on November 1, 1995, aged 89.
