= James M. Bell =

American politician

Member of the Iowa Senate from the 9th district
- In office January 14, 1935 – January 8, 1939
- Preceded by: Clyde Topping
- Succeeded by: Frederick Cromwell

Mayor of Burlington, Iowa
- In office 1916–1920

Personal details
- Born: March 28, 1878 New Boston, Illinois, U.S.
- Died: August 3, 1953 (aged 75) Burlington, Iowa, U.S.
- Party: Democratic
- Spouse: Julia Leake Steinbrecher (m. 1925)
- Children: 2 biological, 1 stepchild
- Occupation: Politician

James M. Bell (March 28, 1878 – August 3, 1953) was an American politician from Iowa.

James M. Bell was born in New Boston, Illinois on March 28, 1878, to parents Vashti Willets Bell and Omer H. Bell. For a time, Bell's family lived in Chicago, where James worked for Marshall Field. They later moved to Burlington, Iowa. Bell enlisted in the Iowa National Guard at the age of fifteen. Bell was later employed by the Borden Milk Company for sixteen years, and subsequently sold insurance.

In 1901, Bell became deputy auditor for Des Moines County. From 1912 to 1916, he chaired the county branch of the Democratic Party. Bell then became involved in municipal politics, serving as the mayor of Burlington through 1920. Throughout the early 1930s, Bell was considered a potential candidate for the Burlington mayoralty. He was elected to the Iowa Senate in 1934, and represented District 9. During his single term as a state senator, Bell unsuccessfully campaigned for the Democratic nomination in Iowa's 1st congressional district in 1936 and 1938. He died on August 3, 1953.
