= John Cramer Voorhees =

American politician (1865–1918)

John Cramer Voorhees (May 18, 1865 – November 21, 1918) was an American politician.

Voorhees was a native of the Whitehouse section of Readington Township, New Jersey, born on May 18, 1865. He was a student of the common schools of the area. Voorhees moved westward in 1881, settling in Anita, Iowa, at the age of sixteen and started working at a hardware store. He later became a banker, farmer, and landowner.

Voorhees was affiliated with the Democratic Party. From 1877 to 1878, he served as a page within the New Jersey General Assembly. After moving to Iowa, Voorhees served a total of sixteen years on the Anita city council, then won election to the Iowa Senate in 1914. He did not complete a full term as a state senator for District 18, as he died on November 21, 1918, while at home in Anita.
