= Charles E. Malone =

American politician (1881–1945)

Charles Edward Malone (October 24, 1881 – March 22, 1945) was an American politician.

Malone was born to parents B. F. and Rebecca Malone on October 24, 1881, and raised on the family farm near Wiota, Iowa. After marrying Edna Harris of Atlantic in 1906, he moved to be nearer her hometown. The couple raised two sons, and moved into Atlantic in 1936.

During his own career in agriculture, Malone established the eponymous Malone Seed Company, served as assistant superintendent of the Iowa Department of Agriculture and Iowan representative at the Louisiana Purchase Exposition, and was appointed by Dante Pierce, the editor of the Iowa Homestead, to represent farmers of the Midwest in a 1931 ceremony marking the installation of new equipment on the Chicago, Rock Island and Pacific and Pennsylvania Railroads. For four decades, Malone was responsible for the Cass County exhibit at the Iowa State Fair.

In 1930 and 1932, Malone was elected as a Democratic legislator for District 30 of the Iowa House of Representatives. He sat in the Iowa Senate for District 18 from 1935 to 1936, stepping down to become postmaster of Atlantic.

He died on March 22, 1945, of a heart attack in Atlantic.
