= Frank Pelzer =

American politician (1876–1944)

Iowa State Senate
- In office 1936 – August 28, 1944

Personal details
- Born: January 28, 1876
- Died: August 28, 1944 (aged 68)
- Party: Republican

Frank Pelzer (January 28, 1876 – August 28, 1944) was an American politician in Iowa.

Frank Pelzer was born on January 28, 1876, to parents Henry Pelzer and Sophia Wolenhaus. He was raised and later ran the family farm in Noble Township. Pelzer married Mary Louise Borth on June 20, 1900, with whom he raised six sons and a daughter. The Pelzers moved to a farm north of Marne in 1909.

Pelzer, a Republican, served on the Cass County board of supervisors for six years, and a decade on the county school board. In 1936, Pelzer was elected to the Iowa Senate and served District 18 until his death on August 28, 1944.
