= Otto Henningsen =

American politician (1883–1961)

Otto H. Henningsen (September 15, 1883 – December 22, 1961) was an American politician.

Henningsen was a native of Clinton, Iowa, born on September 15, 1883, to parents Henning and Anna Henningsen. He attended public and business school in his hometown. Henningson then worked for the Peterson–Bell Box Factory, followed by Curtis Bros. & Co. Between 1922 and 1958, Henningsen was involved in insurance and real estate, serving fifteen years as secretary and treasurer for the Clinton real estate board, and seventeen years as secretary and general manager of the Clinton Plate Glass Association.

Henningsen held several local offices in Clinton, including city council member from the second ward, for four years, and three years as school board member, including a one-year tenure as board president. He worked for the post office for fourteen years, and in 1932, was appointed postmaster in Clinton by Herbert Hoover, and served in the position for four years. Subsequently, Henningsen was elected to the Iowa Senate from District 22 in 1938, 1942, 1946, and 1950 as a Republican. Henningsen stepped down from the state senate in January 1953, to accept a gubernatorial appointment from William S. Beardsley to the Iowa Board of Parole.

Henningsen married Ethel May Bohart in 1909, with whom he had one son, the astronomer Artemus B. Henningsen. Otto Henningsen died at Jane Lamb Hospital in Clinton on December 22, 1961.
