= Thomas Henry Smith (American politician) =

American politician and lawyer (1854–1936)

Thomas Henry Smith (30 September 1854 – 17 September 1936) was an American politician and lawyer.

Smith, known as Tobe, was born on 30 September 1854 to Paris S. and Nancy Jane Smith, who were living in Appanoose County, Iowa, at the time. His mother was originally from West Virginia, and his father was raised in Ohio. Smith's great-grandfather was an American Revolutionary War veteran. Smith himself grew up in Davis County, and later studied at the Southern Iowa Normal School in Bloomfield. Upon turning eighteen, Smith began teaching country school and read law with M. H. Jones, a Bloomfield lawyer. Five years later, Smith passed the bar exam and moved to Harlan on horseback to practice law alongside George W. Cullison, his former instructor at the Southern Iowa Normal School. Smith married Josephine Wonn in 1880, with whom he raised three daughters.

From 1886 to 1888, Smith served as Shelby County attorney, after which he became Harlan's city attorney. He was subsequently elected to the Harlan school board for a single term as a member, and the body's president. Smith was active in party politics as well, serving two terms on the central committee of Shelby County's Republican Party. In 1910, Smith was elected to one four-year term, representing District 18 of the Iowa Senate. He had previously run for the office in 1897, and lost to Joseph Martin Emmert by eleven votes. Smith died in Harlan on 17 September 1936.
