= Ross Mowry =

American politician (1882–1957)

Ross Rutledge Mowry (March 5, 1882 – September 28, 1957) was an American lawyer and politician.

Ross Mowry was born to parents John F. Mowry and Louisa Wilkins on March 5, 1882, and educated in his hometown of Baxter, Iowa. He graduated from the University of Iowa College of Law in 1903, passed the Iowa bar exam that same year, then started privately practicing law in Newton, with the firm Mowry and Cross until 1910.

Mowry, a Republican, left his firm to serve one four-year term as prosecutor in Jasper County, then completed a one-year term as an assistant Attorney General of Iowa. Between 1924 and 1932, Mowry was a United States Attorney for the Southern District of Iowa. Mowry was subsequently elected to two consecutive terms in the Iowa Senate, both for District 29, from 1939 to 1945.

Mowry married Edith Mathews in 1908. The couple raised two daughters, Virginia and Gertrude. He died on September 28, 1957, during his nephew John L. Mowry’s first term in the Iowa House of Representatives.
