= Iowa's 18th Senate district =

American legislative district

Iowa's 18th State Senate district
Senator
Janet Petersen; D

The 18th District of the Iowa Senate is located in central Iowa, and is currently composed of part of Polk County.

== Current elected officials ==
Janet Petersen is the senator currently representing the 18th District.

The area of the 18th District contains two Iowa House of Representatives districts:

- The 35th District (represented by Sean Bagniewski)
- The 36th District (represented by Austin Baeth)

The district is also located in Iowa's 3rd congressional district, which is represented by Zach Nunn.

== List of representatives ==
Representative	Party	Dates	Residence	Notes
William Leffingwell	Democrat	1852-1853	DeWitt, Iowa	
Julius J. Matthews	Whig	1854-1855	Lyons, Iowa	
Marquis Lafayette McPherson	Republican	1856-1859	Winterset, Iowa	
Jairus Edward Neal	Democrat	1860-1863	Knoxville, Iowa	
John Abbott Lake Crookham	Republican	1864-1867	Oskaloosa, Iowa	
John R. Needham	Republican	1868	Oskaloosa, Iowa	Senator Needham died in office in 1868.
John Nicholas Dixon	Republican	1870-1871	Mahaska County, Iowa	
James Addison Young	Republican	1872-1875	Oskaloosa, Iowa	Senator Young died in office in 1875.
Thomas Ritchie Gilmore	Republican	1876-1877	Mahaska County, Iowa	
Lafayette Young	Republican	1878-1881	Albia, Iowa	
Cephas B. Hunt	Republican	1882-1885	Greenfield, Iowa	
Lafayette Young	Republican	1886-1889	Albia, Iowa	
William Fiske Cleveland	Democrat	1890-1893	Harlan, Iowa	
Julian Phelps	Republican	1894-1897	Atlantic, Iowa	
Joseph Martin Emmert	Democrat	1898-1901	Atlantic, Iowa	
James E. Bruce	Republican	1902-1910	Atlantic, Iowa	
Thomas Henry Smith	Republican	1911-1914	Harlan, Iowa	
John Cramer Voorhees	Democrat	1915-1918	Anita, Iowa	Senator Voorhees died in office in 1918.
Julius A. Nelson	Republican	1919-1926	Cass County, Iowa	
Charles D. Booth	Republican	1927-1934	Harlan, Iowa	
Charles E. Malone	Democrat	1935-1936	Atlantic, Iowa	Senator Malone resigned in 1936 to become the postmaster of Atlantic.
Frank Pelzer	Republican	1937-1944	Marne, Iowa	Senator Pelzer died in office in 1944.
Edward Speer White	Republican	1945-1946	Harlan, Iowa	
Jay C. Colburn	Republican	1947-1954	Harlan, Iowa	
John David Shoeman	Republican	1955-1962	Atlantic, Iowa	
David Shaff	Republican	1963-1966	Clinton, Iowa	
Kenneth Benda	Republican	1967-1969	Hartwick, Iowa	resigned to chair the Iowa Commerce Commission
Joann Yessler Orr	Democrat	1969-1970	Grinnell, Iowa	
John L. Mowry	Republican	1971-1972	Marshalltown, Iowa	
Willard R. Hansen	Republican	1973-1980	Cedar Falls, Iowa	
Ted J. Anderson	Democrat	1981-1982	Waterloo, Iowa	
Robert M. Carr	Democrat	1983-1989	Dubuque, Iowa	Senator Carr resigned in 1989 to accept a position as Dubuque County Treasurer.
Michael W. Connolly	Democrat	1990-2002	Dubuque, Iowa	Senator Connolly was elected to district 18 during a special election in 1989.
Mary Lundby	Republican	2003-2008	Linn County, Iowa	
Swati A. Dandekar	Democrat	2009-2011	Marion, Iowa	Senator Dandekar resigned in 2011 to accept a position on the Iowa Utilities Board.
Liz Mathis	Democrat	2011-2012	DeWitt, Iowa	
Janet Petersen	Democrat	2013-present	Des Moines, Iowa	

== Historical district boundaries ==
Map	Description	Years effective	Notes
	Cedar County Clinton County	1852-1855	From 1846 to 1857, district numbering was not utilized by the Iowa State Legislature. This convention was added with the passing of the 1857 Iowa Constitution. Numbering of districts pre-1857 is done as a matter of historic convenience.
	Adair County Cass County; Madison County; Warren County	1856-1859	
	Marion County	1860-1863	
	Mahaska County	1864-1877	
	Adair County Cass County; Madison County	1878-1883	
	Adair County Adams County; Cass County	1884-1887	
	Cass County Shelby County	1888-1962	
	Clinton County	1963-1966	
	Iowa County Poweshiek County	1967-1970	
	Grundy County Marshall County	1971-1972	In 1970, the Iowa Legislature passed an amendment to the Iowa Constitution setting forth the rules for legislative redistricting in order to abide by the rules established by the Reynolds v. Sims Supreme Court case. The first reapportionment map created by the Republican controlled legislature was deemed unconstitutional, but was still used for the 1970 election.
	Black Hawk County (partial): Primarily composed of Cedar Falls	1973-1982	
	Dubuque County (partial): Primarily composed of Dubuque	1983-2002	Some minor boundary changes may have occurred after the redistricting of 1992.
	Linn County (partial): Excluding; Bertram Township; College Township; Marion Township (partial); Marion Township south of Marion and west of US-151 was not part of Senate District 18; the remainder was.; Putnam Township; Bertram; Cedar Rapids; Ely	2003-2012	
	Polk County (partial): Webster Township (partial); Small section between I-35/I-80, the Des Moines River and Des Moines; Des Moines (partial); Northwestern portions of the City	2013-2022	
	Polk County (partial): Des Moines (partial); Western portions of the city	2023-present	

== See also ==
- Iowa General Assembly
- Iowa Senate
