= Iowa's 42nd Senate district =

American legislative district

Senate District 42
- Type: District of the Upper House
- Location: Southeastern Iowa
- Senator: Jeff Reichman (R)
- Parent organization: Iowa General Assembly

The 42nd District of the Iowa Senate is located in eastern Iowa, and is currently composed of part of Benton and Linn counties.

== Current elected officials ==
Jeff Reichman is the senator currently representing the 42nd District.

The area of the 42nd District contains two Iowa House of Representatives districts:

- The 83rd District (represented by Martin Graber)
- The 84th District (represented by Joe Mitchell)

The district is also located in Iowa's 2nd congressional district, which is represented by Mariannette Miller-Meeks.

== Past senators ==
The district has previously been represented by:

- David Readinger, 1983–1988
- Elaine Szymoniak, 1989–1992
- Mike Gronstal, 1993–2002
- Bryan Sievers, 2003–2004
- Frank Wood, 2005–2008
- Shawn Hamerlinck, 2009–2012
- Rich Taylor, 2013-2021
- Jeff Reichman, 2021–present

== See also ==
- Iowa General Assembly
- Iowa Senate
