= Iowa's 44th Senate district =

American legislative district

Senate District 44
- Type: District of the Upper House
- Location: Southeastern Iowa
- Senator: Adrian Dickey (R)
- Parent organization: Iowa General Assembly

The 44th District of the Iowa Senate is located in southeastern Iowa, and is currently composed of Keokuk, Jefferson, and Van Buren counties, as well as part of Mahaska and Henry counties.

== Current elected officials ==
Adrian Dickey is the senator currently representing the 44th District.

The area of the 44th District contains two Iowa House of Representatives districts:

- The 87th District (represented by Dennis Cohoon)
- The 88th District (represented by David Kerr)

The district is also located in Iowa's 2nd congressional district, which is represented by Mariannette Miller-Meeks.

== Past senators ==
The district has previously been represented by:

- John Nystrom, 1983–1991
- Albert Sorensen, 1992
- Leonard Boswell, 1993–1996
- Jeff Angelo, 1997–2002
- Thomas G. Courtney, 2003–2017
- Thomas Greene, 2017–2021
- Tim Goodwin, 2021–2023

== See also ==
- Iowa General Assembly
- Iowa Senate
