= Iowa's 48th Senate district =

American legislative district

Senate District 48
- Type: District of the Upper House
- Location: Eastern Iowa
- Senator: Dan Zumbach (R)
- Parent organization: Iowa General Assembly

The 48th District of the Iowa Senate is located in eastern Iowa, and is currently composed of Louisa County, as well as parts of Des Moines, Henry, and Muscatine counties.

== Current elected officials ==
Dan Zumbach is the senator currently representing the 48th District.

The area of the 48th District contains two Iowa House of Representatives districts:

- The 95th District (represented by Charlie McClintock)
- The 96th District (represented by Lee Hein)

The district is also located in Iowa's 1st congressional district, which is represented by Marianette Miller-Meeks.

== Past senators ==
The district has previously been represented by:

- Jack Kibbie, 1965–1966
- H. Kenneth Nurse, 1967–1968
- Marvin W. Smith, 1969–1970
- Quentin V. Anderson, 1971–1972
- James E. Briles, 1973–1982
- Charles W. Hutchins, 1983–1992
- H. Kay Hedge, 1993–2000
- Sandy Greiner, 2001–2002
- Jeff Angelo, 2003–2008
- Kim Reynolds, 2009–2010, later Iowa Lieutenant Governor (2011-2017) and Governor (2017-2027)
- Joni Ernst, 2011–2012, later US Senator (2015-present)
- Dan Zumbach, 2013–present
