= Iowa's 34th Senate district =

American legislative district

Senate District 34
- Type: District of the Upper House
- Location: Eastern Iowa
- Senator: Liz Mathis (D)
- Parent organization: Iowa General Assembly

The 34th District of the Iowa Senate is located in eastern Iowa, and is currently composed of Buchanan and Delaware counties, as well as part of Black Hawk, Fayette, and Dubuque counties.

== Current elected officials ==
Liz Mathis is the senator currently representing the 34th District.

The area of the 34th District contains two Iowa House of Representatives districts:

- The 67th District (represented by Eric Gjerde)
- The 68th District (represented by Molly Donahue)

The district is also located in Iowa's 1st congressional district, which is represented by Ashley Hinson.

== Past senators ==
The district has previously been represented by:

- Bass Van Gilst, 1983–1984
- John Neighbour, 1985
- John Peterson, 1986–1992
- Tony Bisignano, 1993–1996
- Matt McCoy, 1997–2002
- Dick Dearden, 2003–2012
- Liz Mathis, 2013–present

== See also ==
- Iowa General Assembly
- Iowa Senate
