= 1996 Iowa Senate election =

- November 5, 1996

25 out of 50 seats in the Iowa State Senate 26 seats needed for a majority
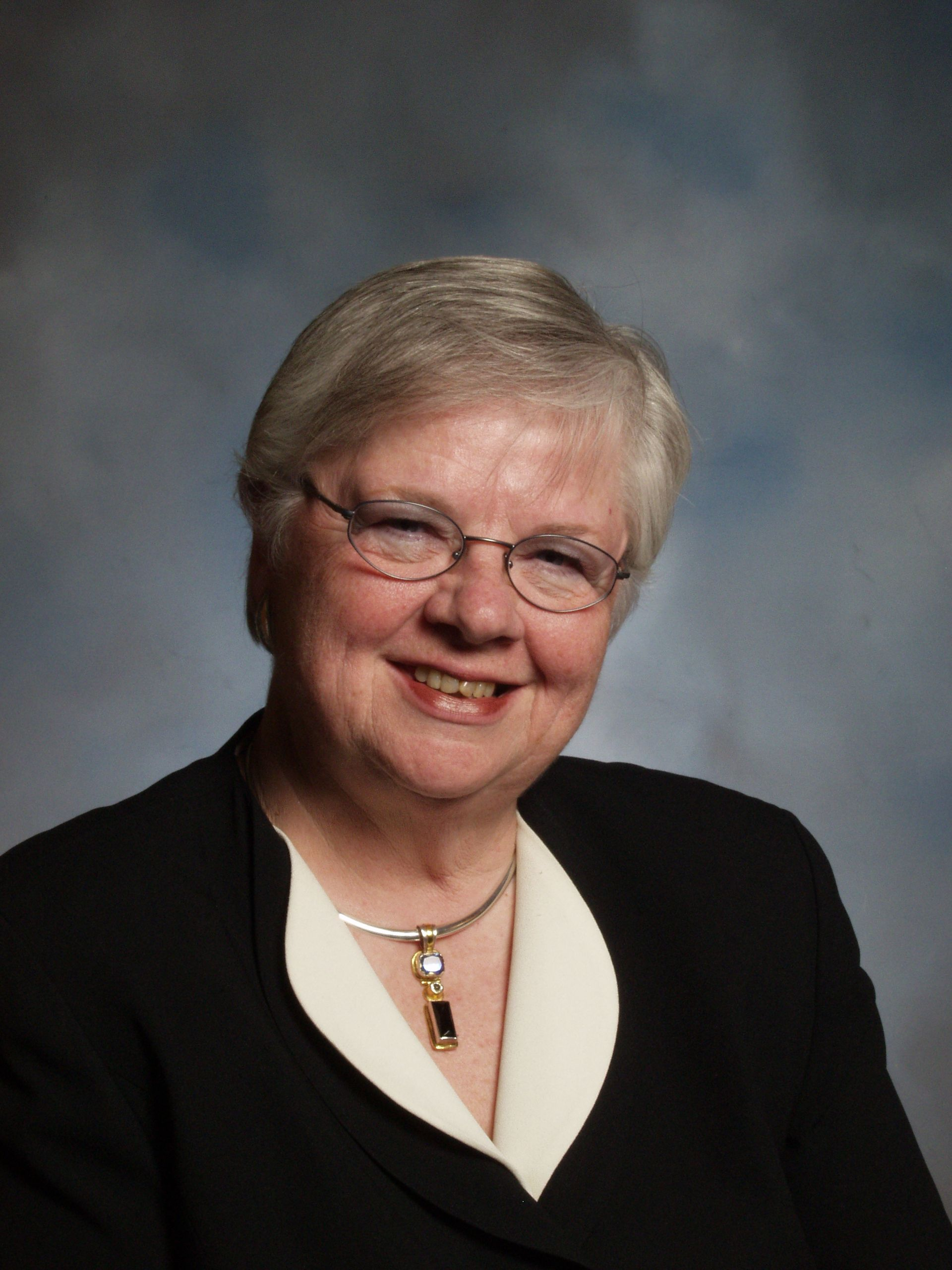

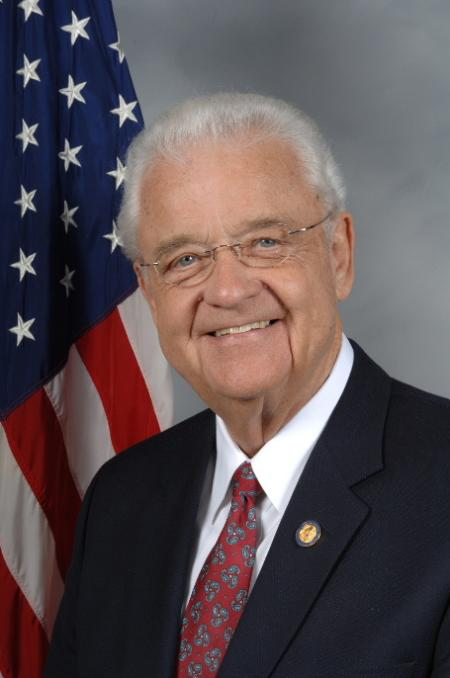
	Majority party	Minority party
Leader	Mary Kramer	Leonard Boswell
Party	Republican	Democratic
Leader's seat	37th	44th (retired)
Last election	23	27
Seats before	23	27
Seats after	29	21
Seat change	▲6	▼6
President of the Senate before election
Leonard Boswell
Democratic
Elected President of the Senate
Mary Kramer
Republican

The 1996 Iowa State Senate elections took place as part of the biennial 1996 United States elections. Iowa voters elected state senators in half of the state senate's districts—the 25 even-numbered state senate districts. State senators serve four-year terms in the Iowa State Senate, with half of the seats up for election each cycle. A statewide map of the 50 state Senate districts in the year 1996 is provided by the Iowa General Assembly here.

The primary election on June 4, 1996 determined which candidates appeared on the November 5, 1996 general election ballot. Primary election results can be obtained here. General election results can be obtained here.

Following the previous election, Democrats had control of the Iowa state Senate with 27 seats to Republicans' 23 seats.

To take control of the chamber from Democrats, the Republicans needed to net three Senate seats.

Republicans claimed control of the Iowa State Senate following the 1996 general election by netting 6sixseats, resulting in Republicans holding 29 seats and Democrats having 21 seats.

== Results ==
- NOTE: The 25 odd-numbered districts did not have elections in 1996, so they are not listed here.

State senate district	Incumbent	Party	Elected senator	Party
2nd	Bradly C. Banks	Rep	John Redwine	Republican
4th	Jack Kibbie	Dem	Jack Kibbie	Democratic
6th	Wayne D. Bennett	Rep	Steve King	Republican
8th	Berl Priebe	Dem	James E. Black	Republican
10th	Merlin Bartz	Rep	Merlin Bartz	Republican
12th	Donald Redfern	Rep	Donald Redfern	Republican
14th	Larry Murphy	Dem	Kitty Rehberg	Republican
16th	Lyle Zieman	Rep	Lyle Zieman	Republican
18th	Mike Connolly	Dem	Mike Connolly	Democratic
20th	Jack Rife	Rep	Jack Rife	Republican
22nd	Patrick J. Deluhery	Dem	Patrick J. Deluhery	Democratic
24th	Richard F. Drake	Rep	Richard F. Drake	Republican
26th	Mary Lundby	Rep	Mary Lundby	Republican
28th	Andy McKean	Rep	Andy McKean	Republican
30th	Emil J. Husak	Dem	Neal Schuerer	Republican
32nd	Randal Giannetto	Dem	Larry McKibben	Republican
34th	Tony Bisignano	Dem	Matt McCoy	Democratic
36th	Elaine Szymoniak	Dem	Elaine Szymoniak	Democratic
38th	Gene Maddox	Rep	Gene Maddox	Republican
40th	Albert Sorensen	Dem	Jerry Behn	Republican
42nd	Michael Gronstal	Dem	Michael Gronstal	Democratic
44th	Leonard Boswell	Dem	Jeff Angelo	Republican
46th	Patty Judge	Dem	Patty Judge	Democratic
48th	H. Kay Hedge	Rep	H. Kay Hedge	Republican
50th	Gene Fraise	Dem	Gene Fraise	Democratic

== Detailed results ==
- Reminder: Only even-numbered Iowa Senate seats were up for election in 1996; therefore, odd-numbered seats did not have elections in 1996 and are not shown.
- Note: If a district does not list a primary, then that district did not have a competitive primary (i.e., there may have only been one candidate file for that district).

=== District 2 ===
Iowa Senate, District 2 Democratic primary election, 1996
Party	Candidate	Votes	%
Democratic	Sandra K. Atkinson	378	56.7
Democratic	Fred J. Sparr	289	43.3
Total votes		667	100.0

Iowa Senate, District 2 general election, 1996
Party	Candidate	Votes	%
Republican	John Redwine	14,437	63.5
Democratic	Sandra K. Atkinson	6,915	30.4
Independent	Fred Sparr	1,397	6.1
Total votes		22,749	100.0
Republican hold			

=== District 4 ===
Iowa Senate, District 4 general election, 1996
Party	Candidate	Votes	%
Democratic	Jack Kibbie (incumbent)	13,810	57.8
Republican	Dan Payne	10,074	42.2
Total votes		23,884	100.0
Democratic hold			

=== District 6 ===
Iowa Senate, District 6 Republican primary election, 1996
Party	Candidate	Votes	%
Republican	Steve King	3,570	68.4
Republican	Wayne D. Bennett (incumbent)	1,651	31.6
Total votes		5,221	100.0

Iowa Senate, District 6 general election, 1996
Party	Candidate	Votes	%
Republican	Steve King	14,440	64.5
Democratic	Eileen Heiden	7,936	35.5
Total votes		22,376	100.0
Republican hold			

=== District 8 ===
Iowa Senate, District 8 Democratic primary election, 1996
Party	Candidate	Votes	%
Democratic	Berl Priebe (incumbent)	1,641	63.3
Democratic	Doug Thompson	951	36.7
Total votes		2,592	100.0

Iowa Senate, District 8 general election, 1996
Party	Candidate	Votes	%
Republican	James Edward Black	13,150	53.3
Democratic	Berl Priebe (incumbent)	11,536	46.7
Total votes		24,686	100.0
Republican gain from Democratic			

=== District 10 ===
Iowa Senate, District 10 general election, 1996
Party	Candidate	Votes	%
Republican	Merlin Bartz (incumbent)	16,031	63.2
Democratic	Robert Perry	9,340	36.8
Total votes		25,371	100.0
Republican hold			

=== District 12 ===
Iowa Senate, District 12 general election, 1996
Party	Candidate	Votes	%
Republican	Donald Redfern (incumbent)	13,692	57.1
Democratic	Michael James Carroll	10,286	42.9
Total votes		23,978	100.0
Republican hold			

=== District 14 ===
Iowa Senate, District 14 general election, 1996
Party	Candidate	Votes	%
Republican	Kitty Rehberg	12,064	51.2
Democratic	Larry Murphy (incumbent)	11,478	48.8
Total votes		23,542	100.0
Republican gain from Democratic			

=== District 16 ===
Iowa Senate, District 16 general election, 1996
Party	Candidate	Votes	%
Republican	Lyle Zieman (incumbent)	13,092	57.6
Democratic	Arthur Walter Moellering	9,632	42.4
Total votes		22,724	100.0
Republican hold			

=== District 18 ===
Iowa Senate, District 18 general election, 1996
Party	Candidate	Votes	%
Democratic	Mike Connolly (incumbent)	14,501	63.0
Republican	Greg Yoko	8,522	37.0
Total votes		23,023	100.0
Democratic hold			

=== District 20 ===
Iowa Senate, District 20 general election, 1996
Party	Candidate	Votes	%
Republican	Jack Rife (incumbent)	12,813	59.9
Democratic	Jill Cirivello	8,589	40.1
Total votes		21,402	100.0
Republican hold			

=== District 22 ===
Iowa Senate, District 22 general election, 1996
Party	Candidate	Votes	%
Democratic	Patrick J. Deluhery (incumbent)	10,669	50.5
Republican	Neil P. Harrison	10,445	49.5
Total votes		21,114	100.0
Democratic hold			

=== District 24 ===
Iowa Senate, District 24 general election, 1996
Party	Candidate	Votes	%
Republican	Richard F. Drake (incumbent)	15,269	100.0
Total votes		15,269	100.0
Republican hold			

=== District 26 ===
Iowa Senate, District 26 general election, 1996
Party	Candidate	Votes	%
Republican	Mary Lundby (incumbent)	18,068	63.6
Democratic	Charlie Brown	10,330	36.4
Total votes		28,398	100.0
Republican hold			

=== District 28 ===
Iowa Senate, District 28 general election, 1996
Party	Candidate	Votes	%
Republican	Andy McKean (incumbent)	19,632	100.0
Total votes		19,632	100.0
Republican hold			

=== District 30 ===
Iowa Senate, District 30 Republican primary election, 1996
Party	Candidate	Votes	%
Republican	Neal Schuerer	1,403	50.4
Republican	Wayne T. Newton	1,378	49.6
Total votes		2,781	100.0

Iowa Senate, District 30 general election, 1996
Party	Candidate	Votes	%
Republican	Neal Schuerer	13,060	52.0
Democratic	Emil J. Husak (incumbent)	12,053	48.0
Total votes		25,113	100.0
Republican gain from Democratic			

=== District 32 ===
Iowa Senate, District 32 general election, 1996
Party	Candidate	Votes	%
Republican	Larry McKibben	13,706	53.6
Democratic	Randy Giannetto (incumbent)	11,393	44.5
Reform	Ronn Young	480	1.9
Total votes		25,579	100.0
Republican gain from Democratic			

=== District 34 ===
Iowa Senate, District 34 Republican primary election, 1996
Party	Candidate	Votes	%
Republican	Chuck Austin	819	60.4
Republican	Rose Scarpino	536	39.6
Total votes		1,355	100.0

Iowa Senate, District 34 general election, 1996
Party	Candidate	Votes	%
Democratic	Matt McCoy	13,262	68.5
Republican	Chuck Austin	6,102	31.5
Total votes		19,364	100.0
Democratic hold			

=== District 36 ===
Iowa Senate, District 36 Republican primary election, 1996
Party	Candidate	Votes	%
Republican	Ronald N. Langston	1,857	67.5
Republican	Pat Anderson	896	32.5
Total votes		2,753	100.0

Iowa Senate, District 36 general election, 1996
Party	Candidate	Votes	%
Democratic	Elaine Szymoniak (incumbent)	12,541	53.0
Republican	Ronald N. Langston	11,116	47.0
Total votes		23,657	100.0
Democratic hold			

=== District 38 ===
Iowa Senate, District 38 general election, 1996
Party	Candidate	Votes	%
Republican	Gene Maddox (incumbent)	20,682	64.8
Democratic	Frank Steinbach	11,241	35.2
Total votes		31,923	100.0
Republican hold			

=== District 40 ===
Iowa Senate, District 40 general election, 1996
Party	Candidate	Votes	%
Republican	Jerry Behn	12,561	52.3
Democratic	Albert Sorensen (incumbent)	11,455	47.7
Total votes		24,016	100.0
Republican gain from Democratic			

=== District 42 ===
Iowa Senate, District 42 general election, 1996
Party	Candidate	Votes	%
Democratic	Michael Gronstal (incumbent)	9,911	50.4
Republican	Carl L. Heinrich	9,761	49.6
Total votes		19,672	100.0
Democratic hold			

=== District 44 ===
Iowa Senate, District 44 Republican primary election, 1996
Party	Candidate	Votes	%
Republican	Jeff Angelo	4,109	55.9
Republican	Pete Wenstrand	3,241	44.1
Total votes		7,350	100.0

Iowa Senate, District 44 Democratic primary election, 1996
Party	Candidate	Votes	%
Democratic	J. Kelly Tobin	1,743	52.8
Democratic	Kevin L. Wynn	1,557	47.2
Total votes		3,300	100.0

Iowa Senate, District 44 general election, 1996
Party	Candidate	Votes	%
Republican	Jeff Angelo	14,517	60.6
Democratic	J. Kelly Tobin	9,437	39.4
Total votes		23,954	100.0
Republican gain from Democratic			

=== District 46 ===
Iowa Senate, District 46 general election, 1996
Party	Candidate	Votes	%
Democratic	Patty Judge (incumbent)	14,181	61.1
Republican	Claude R. Neill	9,012	38.9
Total votes		23,193	100.0
Democratic hold			

=== District 48 ===
Iowa Senate, District 48 general election, 1996
Party	Candidate	Votes	%
Republican	H. Kay Hedge (incumbent)	15,325	69.9
Democratic	John A. Peterson	6,606	30.1
Total votes		21,931	100.0
Republican hold			

=== District 50 ===
Iowa Senate, District 50 general election, 1996
Party	Candidate	Votes	%
Democratic	Gene Fraise (incumbent)	12,721	56.4
Republican	Mike Fesler	9,817	43.6
Total votes		22,538	100.0
Democratic hold			

== See also ==
- United States elections, 1996
- United States House of Representatives elections in Iowa, 1996
- Elections in Iowa
