= 2000 Iowa Senate election =

- November 7, 2000

25 out of 50 seats in the Iowa State Senate 26 seats needed for a majority
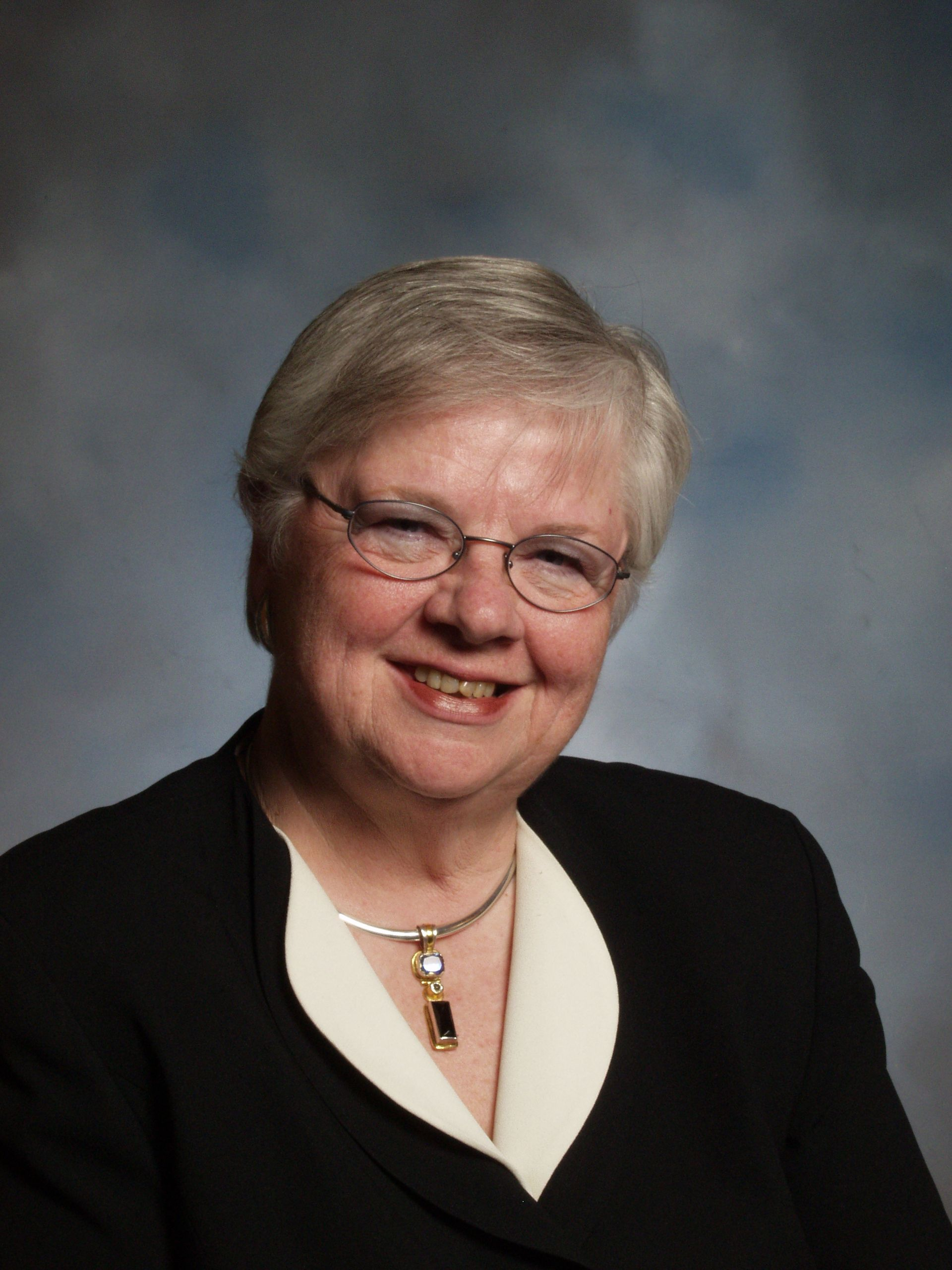

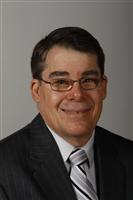
	Majority party	Minority party
Leader	Mary Kramer	Michael Gronstal
Party	Republican	Democratic
Leader's seat	37th	42nd
Last election	30	20
Seats before	30	20
Seats after	30	20
Seat change	Steady	Steady
President of the Senate before election
Mary Kramer
Republican
Elected President of the Senate
Mary Kramer
Republican

The 2000 Iowa State Senate elections took place as part of the biennial 2000 United States elections. Iowa voters elected state senators in half of the state senate's districts—the 25 even-numbered state senate districts. State senators serve four-year terms in the Iowa State Senate, with half of the seats up for election each cycle. A statewide map of the 50 state Senate districts in the year 2000 is provided by the Iowa General Assembly here.

The primary election on June 6, 2000, determined which candidates appeared on the November 7, 2000 general election ballot. Primary election results can be obtained here. General election results can be obtained here.

Following the previous election, Republicans had control of the Iowa state Senate with 30 seats to Democrats' 20 seats.

To reclaim control of the chamber from Republicans, the Democrats needed to net 6 Senate seats.

Republicans maintained control of the Iowa State Senate following the 2000 general election with the balance of power remaining unchanged with Republicans holding 30 seats and Democrats having 20 seats.

== Summary of Results ==
- NOTE: The 25 odd-numbered districts did not have elections in 2000 so they are not listed here.

State Senate District	Incumbent	Party	Elected Senator	Party
2nd	John Redwine	Rep	John Redwine	Republican
4th	Jack Kibbie	Dem	Jack Kibbie	Democratic
6th	Steve King	Rep	Steve King	Republican
8th	E. Thurman Gaskill	Rep	E. Thurman Gaskill	Republican
10th	Merlin Bartz	Rep	Merlin Bartz	Republican
12th	Donald Redfern	Rep	Donald Redfern	Republican
14th	Kitty Rehberg	Rep	Kitty Rehberg	Republican
16th	Lyle Zieman	Rep	Mark Zieman	Republican
18th	Mike Connolly	Dem	Mike Connolly	Democratic
20th	Jack Rife	Rep	Tom Fiegen	Democratic
22nd	Patrick J. Deluhery	Dem	Patrick J. Deluhery	Democratic
24th	Richard F. Drake	Rep	Richard F. Drake	Republican
26th	Mary Lundby	Rep	Mary Lundby	Republican
28th	Andy McKean	Rep	Andy McKean	Republican
30th	Neal Schuerer	Rep	Neal Schuerer	Republican
32nd	Larry McKibben	Rep	Larry McKibben	Republican
34th	Matt McCoy	Dem	Matt McCoy	Democratic
36th	Elaine Szymoniak	Dem	Jack Holveck	Democratic
38th	Gene Maddox	Rep	Gene Maddox	Republican
40th	Jerry Behn	Rep	Jerry Behn	Republican
42nd	Michael Gronstal	Dem	Michael Gronstal	Democratic
44th	Jeff Angelo	Rep	Jeff Angelo	Republican
46th	John Judge	Dem	Paul McKinley	Republican
48th	H. Kay Hedge	Rep	Sandy Greiner	Republican
50th	Gene Fraise	Dem	Gene Fraise	Democratic

== Detailed Results ==
- Reminder: Only even-numbered Iowa Senate seats were up for election in 2000; therefore, odd-numbered seats did not have elections in 2000 & are not shown.
- Note: If a district does not list a primary, then that district did not have a competitive primary (i.e., there may have only been one candidate file for that district).

=== District 2 ===
Iowa Senate, District 2 General Election, 2000
Party	Candidate	Votes	%
Republican	John Redwine (incumbent)	18,397	100.0
Total votes		18,397	100.0
Republican hold			

=== District 4 ===
Iowa Senate, District 4 General Election, 2000
Party	Candidate	Votes	%
Democratic	Jack Kibbie (incumbent)	15,246	61.5
Republican	Jeffrey Thee	9,561	38.5
Total votes		24,807	100.0
Democratic hold			

=== District 6 ===
Iowa Senate, District 6 Democratic Primary Election, 2000
Party	Candidate	Votes	%
Democratic	Dennis J. Ryan	643	51.1
Democratic	Donald Mason	615	48.9
Total votes		1,258	100.0

Iowa Senate, District 6 General Election, 2000
Party	Candidate	Votes	%
Republican	Steve King (incumbent)	14,842	69.6
Democratic	Dennis J. Ryan	6,470	30.4
Total votes		21,312	100.0
Republican hold			

=== District 8 ===
Iowa Senate, District 8 Republican Primary Election, 2000
Party	Candidate	Votes	%
Republican	E. Thurman Gaskill (incumbent)	2,083	75.7
Republican	Lyle Spencer	669	24.3
Total votes		2,752	100.0

Iowa Senate, District 8 General Election, 2000
Party	Candidate	Votes	%
Republican	E. Thurman Gaskill (incumbent)	13,943	56.8
Democratic	William S. Farnham	10,588	43.2
Total votes		24,531	100.0
Republican hold			

=== District 10 ===
Iowa Senate, District 10 General Election, 2000
Party	Candidate	Votes	%
Republican	Merlin Bartz (incumbent)	16,948	65.0
Democratic	Jerry Theilen	9,145	35.0
Total votes		26,093	100.0
Republican hold			

=== District 12 ===
Iowa Senate, District 12 General Election, 2000
Party	Candidate	Votes	%
Republican	Donald Redfern (incumbent)	15,077	59.5
Democratic	John Padget	10,247	40.5
Total votes		25,324	100.0
Republican hold			

=== District 14 ===
Iowa Senate, District 14 General Election, 2000
Party	Candidate	Votes	%
Republican	Kitty Rehberg (incumbent)	14,445	59.5
Democratic	Jeanette Randall	9,824	40.5
Total votes		24,269	100.0
Republican hold			

=== District 16 ===
Iowa Senate, District 16 Republican Primary Election, 2000
Party	Candidate	Votes	%
Republican	Mark Zieman	3,261	69.4
Republican	Dave Duncklee	1,435	30.6
Total votes		4,696	100.0

Iowa Senate, District 16 General Election, 2000
Party	Candidate	Votes	%
Republican	Mark Zieman	13,847	56.2
Democratic	Roger Thomas	10,807	43.8
Total votes		24,654	100.0
Republican hold			

=== District 18 ===
Iowa Senate, District 18 General Election, 2000
Party	Candidate	Votes	%
Democratic	Mike Connolly (incumbent)	16,816	57.3
Republican	Stephen Potts	12,528	42.7
Total votes		29,344	100.0
Democratic hold			

=== District 20 ===
Iowa Senate, District 20 General Election, 2000
Party	Candidate	Votes	%
Democratic	Tom Fiegen	12,641	51.4
Republican	Jack Rife (incumbent)	11,971	48.6
Total votes		24,612	100.0
Democratic gain from Republican			

=== District 22 ===
Iowa Senate, District 22 Democratic Primary Election, 2000
Party	Candidate	Votes	%
Democratic	Patrick J. Deluhery (incumbent)	554	87.8
Democratic	Tina M. Clawson	77	12.2
Total votes		631	100.0

Iowa Senate, District 22 General Election, 2000
Party	Candidate	Votes	%
Democratic	Patrick J. Deluhery (incumbent)	13,080	58.3
Republican	Patrick J. Gibbs	9,366	41.7
Total votes		22,446	100.0
Democratic hold			

=== District 24 ===
Iowa Senate, District 24 General Election, 2000
Party	Candidate	Votes	%
Republican	Richard F. Drake (incumbent)	12,147	54.9
Democratic	Anne Lesnet	9,963	45.1
Total votes		22,110	100.0
Republican hold			

=== District 26 ===
Iowa Senate, District 26 General Election, 2000
Party	Candidate	Votes	%
Republican	Mary Lundby (incumbent)	20,773	65.2
Democratic	Harvey S. Ross	11,095	34.8
Total votes		31,868	100.0
Republican hold			

=== District 28 ===
Iowa Senate, District 28 General Election, 2000
Party	Candidate	Votes	%
Republican	Andy McKean (incumbent)	17,577	57.1
Democratic	Gary Hart	13,210	42.9
Total votes		30,787	100.0
Republican hold			

=== District 30 ===
Iowa Senate, District 30 General Election, 2000
Party	Candidate	Votes	%
Republican	Neal Schuerer (incumbent)	14,994	54.7
Democratic	Ronald F. Donald	12,406	45.3
Total votes		27,400	100.0
Republican hold			

=== District 32 ===
Iowa Senate, District 32 General Election, 2000
Party	Candidate	Votes	%
Republican	Larry McKibben (incumbent)	15,803	58.7
Democratic	John M. Cahill	11,131	41.3
Total votes		26,934	100.0
Republican hold			

=== District 34 ===
Iowa Senate, District 34 General Election, 2000
Party	Candidate	Votes	%
Democratic	Matt McCoy (incumbent)	16,393	100.0
Total votes		16,393	100.0
Democratic hold			

=== District 36 ===
Iowa Senate, District 36 General Election, 2000
Party	Candidate	Votes	%
Democratic	Jack Holveck	14,178	59.9
Republican	Ronald N. Langston	9,501	40.1
Total votes		23,679	100.0
Democratic hold			

=== District 38 ===
Iowa Senate, District 38 General Election, 2000
Party	Candidate	Votes	%
Republican	Gene Maddox (incumbent)	23,762	64.7
Democratic	Joe Cataldo	12,949	35.3
Total votes		36,711	100.0
Republican hold			

=== District 40 ===
Iowa Senate, District 40 General Election, 2000
Party	Candidate	Votes	%
Republican	Jerry Behn (incumbent)	14,287	57.9
Democratic	Joan Phillips	10,404	42.1
Total votes		24,691	100.0
Republican hold			

=== District 42 ===
Iowa Senate, District 42 General Election, 2000
Party	Candidate	Votes	%
Democratic	Michael Gronstal (incumbent)	10,963	54.2
Republican	Linda Primmer	9,272	45.8
Total votes		20,235	100.0
Democratic hold			

=== District 44 ===
Iowa Senate, District 44 General Election, 2000
Party	Candidate	Votes	%
Republican	Jeff Angelo (incumbent)	15,367	65.0
Democratic	Warren Woods	8,260	35.0
Total votes		23,627	100.0
Republican hold			

=== District 46 ===
Iowa Senate, District 46 General Election, 2000
Party	Candidate	Votes	%
Republican	Paul McKinley	12,787	53.1
Democratic	John Judge (incumbent)	11,276	46.9
Total votes		24,063	100.0
Republican gain from Democratic			

=== District 48 ===
Iowa Senate, District 48 General Election, 2000
Party	Candidate	Votes	%
Republican	Sandy Greiner	16,565	70.0
Democratic	William E. Kuntz	7,101	30.0
Total votes		23,666	100.0
Republican hold			

=== District 50 ===
Iowa Senate, District 50 General Election, 2000
Party	Candidate	Votes	%
Democratic	Gene Fraise (incumbent)	18,585	100.0
Total votes		18,585	100.0
Democratic hold			

== See also ==
- United States elections, 2000
- United States House of Representatives elections in Iowa, 2000
- Elections in Iowa
