= 1992 Iowa Senate election =

- November 3, 1992

32 out of 50 seats in the Iowa State Senate 26 seats needed for a majority
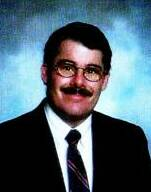

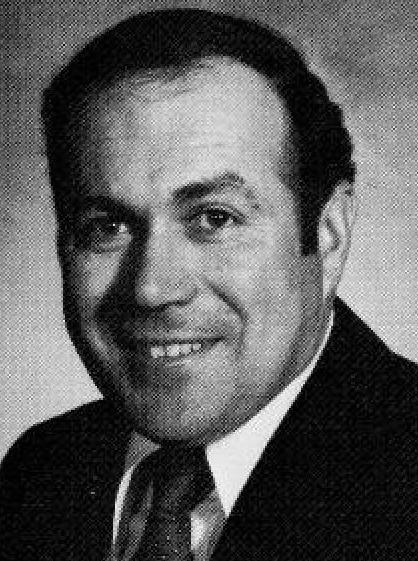
	Majority party	Minority party
Leader	Michael Gronstal	Jack Rife
Party	Democratic	Republican
Leader's seat	42nd	20th
Last election	28	22
Seats before	29 (Note: Democrat Albert Sorensen won a special election on December 17, 1991 to fill a vacancy in District 44 that had been held by Republican Jack Nystrom.)	21
Seats after	27	23
Seat change	▼2	▲2
President of the Senate before election
Michael Gronstal
Democratic
Elected President of the Senate
Leonard Boswell
Democratic

The 1992 Iowa State Senate elections took place as part of the biennial 1992 United States elections. Iowa voters elected state senators in 32 of the state senate's 50 districts—all 25 of the even-numbered seats were up for regularly scheduled elections and, due to the oddities of redistricting following the 1990 Census, seven of the odd-numbered seats were up as well. State senators serve four-year terms in the Iowa State Senate, with half of the seats traditionally up for election each cycle.

The Iowa General Assembly provides statewide maps of each district. To compare the effect of the 1991 redistricting process on the location of each district, contrast the previous map with the map used for 1992 elections.

The primary election on June 2, 1992, determined which candidates appeared on the November 3, 1992 general election ballot. Primary election results can be obtained here. General election results can be obtained here.

Following the previous election, Democrats had control of the Iowa state Senate with 28 seats to Republicans' 22 seats. On December 17, 1991, a special election in district 44 resulted in Albert Sorensen flipping a seat in favor of the Democrats. Therefore, on election day in November 1992, Democrats controlled 29 seats and Republicans had 21.

To reclaim control of the chamber from Democrats, the Republicans needed to net 5 Senate seats.

Democrats maintained control of the Iowa State Senate following the 1992 general election with the balance of power shifting to Democrats holding 27 seats and Republicans having 23 seats (a net gain of 2 seats for the Republicans).

== Results ==
- NOTE: Most of the 25 odd-numbered districts did not have elections in 1992 so they are not listed here.
- Also note, an asterisk (*) after a Senator's name indicates they were an incumbent re-elected, but to a new district number due to redistricting.

State Senate District	Incumbent	Party	Elected Senator	Party
2nd	Donald V. Doyle	Dem	Bradly C. Banks	Republican
3rd	Wilmer Rensink	Rep	Wilmer Rensink	Republican
4th	Richard Vande Hoef	Rep	Jack Kibbie* (Note: Redistricted from district 6 to 4.)	Democratic
6th	Jack Kibbie	Dem	Wayne D. Bennett	Republican
8th	Berl Priebe	Dem	Berl Priebe	Democratic
10th	Alvin V. Miller	Dem	Merlin Bartz	Republican
12th	Harry G. Slife	Rep	Harry G. Slife	Republican
14th	Larry Murphy	Dem	Larry Murphy	Democratic
16th	Dale L. Tieden	Rep	Lyle Zieman	Republican
18th	Mike Connolly	Dem	Mike Connolly	Democratic
20th	Maggie Tinsman	Rep	Jack Rife* (Note: Redistricted from district 29 to 20.)	Republican
21st	Patrick J. Deluhery	Dem	Maggie Tinsman* (Note: Redistricted from district 20 to 21.)	Republican
22nd	Beverly Hannon	Dem	Patrick J. Deluhery* (Note: Redistricted from district 21 to 22.)	Democratic
24th	Paul Pate	Rep	Richard F. Drake* (Note: Redistricted from district 28 to 24.)	Republican
26th	Richard V. Running	Dem	Paul Pate* (Note: Redistricted from district 24 to 26.)	Republican
27th	Richard J. Varn	Dem	Wally Horn* (Note: Redistricted from district 25 to 27.)	Democratic
28th	Richard F. Drake	Rep	Andy McKean	Republican
30th	Mark R. Hagerla	Rep	Emil J. Husak* (Note: Redistricted from district 38 to 30.)	Democratic
32nd	H. Kay Hedge	Rep	Randal Giannetto	Democratic
34th	John A. Peterson	Dem	Tony Bisignano	Democratic
36th	John E. Soorholtz	Rep	Elaine Szymoniak* (Note: Redistricted from district 42 to 36.)	Democratic
37th	Ralph Rosenberg	Dem	Mary Kramer* (Note: Redistricted from district 41 to 37.)	Republican
38th	Emil J. Husak	Dem	Gene Maddox	Republican
40th	George Kinley	Dem	Albert Sorensen* (Note: Redistricted from district 44 to 40.)	Democratic
41st	Mary Kramer	Rep	Jack W. Hester* (Note: Redistricted from district 49 to 41.)	Republican
42nd	Elaine Szymoniak	Dem	Michael Gronstal* (Note: Redistricted from district 50 to 42.)	Democratic
44th	Albert Sorensen	Dem	Leonard Boswell* (Note: Redistrict from district 46 to 44.)	Democratic
45th	James R. Riordan	Dem	Bill Fink	Democratic
46th	Leonard Boswell	Dem	Patty Judge	Democratic
48th	Charles W. Hutchins	Dem	H. Kay Hedge* (Note: Redistricted from district 32 to 48.)	Republican
49th	Jack W. Hester	Rep	Tom Vilsack	Democratic
50th	Michael Gronstal	Dem	Gene Fraise* (Note: Redistricted from district 31 to 50.)	Democratic

== Detailed Results ==
- Reminder: All even-numbered Iowa Senate seats were up for election in 1992 as well as 7 odd-numbered districts due to the oddities caused by redistricting.
- Note: If a district does not list a primary, then that district did not have a competitive primary (i.e., there may have only been one candidate file for that district).

=== District 2 ===
Iowa Senate, District 2 General Election, 1992
Party	Candidate	Votes	%
Republican	Brad Banks	15,659	63.4
Democratic	Donald V. Doyle (incumbent)	9,039	36.6
Total votes		24,698	100.0
Republican gain from Democratic			

=== District 3 ===
Iowa Senate, District 3 General Election, 1992
Party	Candidate	Votes	%
Republican	Wilmer Rensink (incumbent)	20,066	100.0
Total votes		20,066	100.0
Republican hold			

=== District 4 ===
Iowa Senate, District 4 General Election, 1992
Party	Candidate	Votes	%
Democratic	Jack Kibbie (incumbent)	15,139	60.5
Republican	Lannie Miller	9,866	39.5
Total votes		25,005	100.0
Democratic gain from Republican			

=== District 6 ===
Iowa Senate, District 6 Democratic Primary Election, 1992
Party	Candidate	Votes	%
Democratic	Louis J. Muhlbauer	1,267	50.6
Democratic	Clifford Friedrichsen	1,237	49.4
Total votes		2,504	100.0

Iowa Senate, District 6 General Election, 1992
Party	Candidate	Votes	%
Republican	Wayne D. Bennett	12,914	54.1
Democratic	Louis J. Muhlbauer	10,950	45.9
Total votes		23,864	100.0
Republican gain from Democratic			

=== District 8 ===
Iowa Senate, District 8 General Election, 1992
Party	Candidate	Votes	%
Democratic	Berl Priebe (incumbent)	13,223	50.6
Republican	Larry B. Miller	12,910	49.4
Total votes		26,133	100.0
Democratic hold			

=== District 10 ===
Iowa Senate, District 10 General Election, 1992
Party	Candidate	Votes	%
Republican	Merlin Bartz	15,093	54.4
Democratic	John Groninga	12,658	45.6
Total votes		27,751	100.0
Republican gain from Democratic			

=== District 12 ===
Iowa Senate, District 12 General Election, 1992
Party	Candidate	Votes	%
Republican	Harry Slife (incumbent)	14,313	100.0
Total votes		14,313	100.0
Republican hold			

=== District 14 ===
Iowa Senate, District 14 General Election, 1992
Party	Candidate	Votes	%
Democratic	Larry Murphy (incumbent)	12,455	50.03
Republican	Joseph M. Kremer	12,439	49.97
Total votes		24,894	100.0
Democratic hold			

=== District 16 ===
Iowa Senate, District 16 Republican Primary Election, 1992
Party	Candidate	Votes	%
Republican	Lyle Zieman	3,316	66.3
Republican	Jere Probert	1,685	33.7
Total votes		5,001	100.0

Iowa Senate, District 16 General Election, 1992
Party	Candidate	Votes	%
Republican	Lyle Zieman	13,546	55.0
Democratic	Paul W. Johnson	11,092	45.0
Total votes		24,638	100.0
Republican hold			

=== District 18 ===
Iowa Senate, District 18 General Election, 1992
Party	Candidate	Votes	%
Democratic	Mike Connolly (incumbent)	19,578	100.0
Total votes		19,578	100.0
Democratic hold			

=== District 20 ===
Iowa Senate, District 20 General Election, 1992
Party	Candidate	Votes	%
Republican	Jack Rife (incumbent)	12,414	51.2
Democratic	Beverly Hannon (incumbent) (Note: Redistricted from district 22 to 20.)	11,815	48.8
Total votes		24,229	100.0
Republican hold			

=== District 21 ===
Iowa Senate, District 21 General Election, 1992
Party	Candidate	Votes	%
Republican	Maggie Tinsman (incumbent)	17,490	66.7
Democratic	Thomas C. Fritzsche	8,720	33.3
Total votes		26,210	100.0
Republican gain from Democratic			

=== District 22 ===
Iowa Senate, District 22 General Election, 1992
Party	Candidate	Votes	%
Democratic	Patrick J. Deluhery (incumbent)	12,706	55.3
Republican	Paul W. Janecek	10,274	44.7
Total votes		22,980	100.0
Democratic hold			

=== District 24 ===
Iowa Senate, District 24 General Election, 1992
Party	Candidate	Votes	%
Republican	Richard F. Drake (incumbent)	14,919	100.0
Total votes		14,919	100.0
Republican hold			

=== District 26 ===
Iowa Senate, District 26 General Election, 1992
Party	Candidate	Votes	%
Republican	Paul Pate (incumbent)	17,854	60.1
Democratic	Sylvia D. Kelley	11,843	39.9
Total votes		29,697	100.0
Republican gain from Democratic			

=== District 27 ===
Iowa Senate, District 27 General Election, 1992
Party	Candidate	Votes	%
Democratic	Wally Horn (incumbent)	20,077	100.0
Total votes		20,077	100.0
Democratic hold			

=== District 28 ===
Iowa Senate, District 28 General Election, 1992
Party	Candidate	Votes	%
Republican	Andy McKean	16,912	61.7
Democratic	Shawn Gallagher	10,476	38.3
Total votes		27,388	100.0
Republican hold			

=== District 30 ===
Iowa Senate, District 30 Republican Primary Election, 1992
Party	Candidate	Votes	%
Republican	Daniel J. Bruene	1,394	74.2
Republican	Galen Delfs	484	25.8
Total votes		1,878	100.0

Iowa Senate, District 30 Democratic Primary Election, 1992
Party	Candidate	Votes	%
Democratic	Emil J. Husak (incumbent)	2,326	77.4
Democratic	Clinton Berryhill	680	22.6
Total votes		3,006	100.0

Iowa Senate, District 30 General Election, 1992
Party	Candidate	Votes	%
Democratic	Emil J. Husak (incumbent)	16,398	65.1
Republican	Daniel J. Bruene	8,778	34.9
Total votes		25,176	100.0
Democratic gain from Republican			

=== District 32 ===
Iowa Senate, District 32 Republican Primary Election, 1992
Party	Candidate	Votes	%
Republican	Philip H. Lewis	1,312	39.3
Republican	Bill Crews	1,256	37.6
Republican	Mike Riemenschneider	773	23.1
Total votes		3,341	100.0

Iowa Senate, District 32 Democratic Primary Election, 1992
Party	Candidate	Votes	%
Democratic	Randal John Giannetto	1,000	65.7
Democratic	Dick Kay	521	34.3
Total votes		1,521	100.0

Iowa Senate, District 32 General Election, 1992
Party	Candidate	Votes	%
Democratic	Randal John Giannetto	14,184	55.1
Republican	Philip H. Lewis	11,554	44.9
Total votes		25,738	100.0
Democratic gain from Republican			

=== District 34 ===
Iowa Senate, District 34 General Election, 1992
Party	Candidate	Votes	%
Democratic	Tony Bisignano	17,851	100.0
Total votes		17,851	100.0
Democratic hold			

=== District 36 ===
Iowa Senate, District 36 Democratic Primary Election, 1992
Party	Candidate	Votes	%
Democratic	Elaine Szymoniak (incumbent)	2,192	53.9
Democratic	Jack Hatch	1,876	46.1
Total votes		4,068	100.0

Iowa Senate, District 36 General Election, 1992
Party	Candidate	Votes	%
Democratic	Elaine Szymoniak (incumbent)	16,077	59.8
Republican	Kathryn S. Freilinger	10,829	40.2
Total votes		26,906	100.0
Democratic gain from Republican			

=== District 37 ===
Iowa Senate, District 37 General Election, 1992
Party	Candidate	Votes	%
Republican	Mary Kramer (incumbent)	20,746	65.5
Democratic	Mike A. Murillo, Jr.	10,942	34.5
Total votes		31,688	100.0
Republican gain from Democratic			

=== District 38 ===
Iowa Senate, District 38 Republican Primary Election, 1992
Party	Candidate	Votes	%
Republican	Gene Maddox	1,888	66.1
Republican	Doug Stout	969	33.9
Total votes		2,857	100.0

Iowa Senate, District 38 Democratic Primary Election, 1992
Party	Candidate	Votes	%
Democratic	Marlene K. Kavan	994	53.6
Democratic	Richard Groth	860	46.4
Total votes		1,854	100.0

Iowa Senate, District 38 General Election, 1992
Party	Candidate	Votes	%
Republican	Gene Maddox	19,092	59.5
Democratic	Marlene K. Kavan	12,979	40.5
Total votes		32,071	100.0
Republican gain from Democratic			

=== District 40 ===
Iowa Senate, District 40 General Election, 1992
Party	Candidate	Votes	%
Democratic	Albert Sorensen (incumbent)	14,080	57.4
Republican	Don Riemenschneider	10,471	42.6
Total votes		24,551	100.0
Democratic hold			

=== District 41 ===
Iowa Senate, District 41 General Election, 1992
Party	Candidate	Votes	%
Republican	Jack W. Hester (incumbent)	13,102	53.5
Democratic	Orv Roecker	11,405	46.5
Total votes		24,507	100.0
Republican hold			

=== District 42 ===
Iowa Senate, District 42 General Election, 1992
Party	Candidate	Votes	%
Democratic	Michael Gronstal (incumbent)	11,030	53.6
Republican	William A. Ballenger	9,546	46.4
Total votes		20,576	100.0
Democratic hold			

=== District 44 ===
Iowa Senate, District 44 General Election, 1992
Party	Candidate	Votes	%
Democratic	Leonard Boswell (incumbent)	16,021	62.4
Republican	Gordon Kokenge	9,674	37.6
Total votes		25,695	100.0
Democratic hold			

=== District 45 ===
Iowa Senate, District 45 Republican Primary Election, 1992
Party	Candidate	Votes	%
Republican	David V. Gorsche	884	66.7
Republican	William J. Mahon	442	33.3
Total votes		1,326	100.0

Iowa Senate, District 45 Democratic Primary Election, 1992
Party	Candidate	Votes	%
Democratic	Bill Fink	1,600	47.3
Democratic	John A. Peterson (incumbent) (Note: Redistricted from district 34 to 45.)	996	29.4
Democratic	Mike Barker	789	23.3
Total votes		3,385	100.0

Iowa Senate, District 45 General Election, 1992
Party	Candidate	Votes	%
Democratic	Bill Fink	12,300	50.4
Republican	David V. Gorsche	12,102	49.6
Total votes		24,402	100.0
Democratic hold			

=== District 46 ===
Iowa Senate, District 46 Republican Primary Election, 1992
Party	Candidate	Votes	%
Republican	Richard Arnold	2,002	61.3
Republican	Howard W. Greiner	1,262	38.7
Total votes		3,264	100.0

Iowa Senate, District 46 Democratic Primary Election, 1992
Party	Candidate	Votes	%
Democratic	Patty Judge	3,198	59.8
Democratic	F. David Rinehart	2,154	40.2
Total votes		5,352	100.0

Iowa Senate, District 46 General Election, 1992
Party	Candidate	Votes	%
Democratic	Patty Judge	13,280	52.3
Republican	Richard Arnold	12,135	47.7
Total votes		25,415	100.0
Democratic hold			

=== District 48 ===
Iowa Senate, District 48 General Election, 1992
Party	Candidate	Votes	%
Republican	H. Kay Hedge (incumbent)	15,529	100.0
Total votes		15,529	100.0
Republican gain from Democratic			

=== District 49 ===
Iowa Senate, District 49 General Election, 1992
Party	Candidate	Votes	%
Democratic	Tom Vilsack	12,544	50.1
Republican	Dave Heaton	10,551	42.1
Independent	Dan Reed	1,945	7.8
Total votes		25,040	100.0
Democratic gain from Republican			

=== District 50 ===
Iowa Senate, District 50 General Election, 1992
Party	Candidate	Votes	%
Democratic	Gene Fraise (incumbent)	14,234	55.2
Republican	Mark R. Hagerla (incumbent) (Note: Redistricted from district 30 to 50.)	11,536	44.8
Total votes		25,770	100.0
Democratic hold			

== See also ==
- United States elections, 1992
- United States House of Representatives elections in Iowa, 1992
- Elections in Iowa
