= List of special elections to the Iowa Senate =

Special elections to the Iowa Senate are called by the Governor of Iowa when a vacancy arises within the State Senate. If there is a vacancy in the Iowa General Assembly (i.e., the Iowa state legislature), the vacant seat must be filled by special election. If the vacancy occurs while the General Assembly is in session, the Governor must call within five days of the occurrence of the vacancy for an election as expeditiously as feasible, with a minimum 18-day notice. If the vacancy happens while the General Assembly is out of session, the special election must follow a 45-day notice, as long as the election does not coincide with a school election. All special elections must be held on a Tuesday.

== List of special elections ==
District	Election Date	Predecessor	Special Election Winner
39th	February 17, 1913	Charles Gates (R)	F. P. Hagemann (D)
37th	March 31, 1923	Daniel Cady Chase (R)	William Schmedika (D)
4th	February 1, 1933	John Henry Judd (D)	Joseph E. Doze (D)
29th	March 24, 1933	Oliver Perry Myers (D)	D. Myron Tripp (D)
35th	August 22, 1933	Matt D. Cooney (D)	Howard C. Baldwin (D)
45th	October 3, 1933	Harry Cook White (D)	Richard V. Leo (R)
2nd	January 17, 1944	Sanford Zeigler (R)	Charles W. Wade (R)
5th	January 17, 1944	Stephen Ray Emerson (R)	T. M. Thompson (R)
28th	January 26, 1945	Benjamin Chase Whitehill (R)	Robert A. Rockhill (R)
37th	January 6, 1947	George Raymond Hill (R)	Rex R. Bateson (R)
15th	January 10, 1963	L. C. Shivvers (R)	Vera H. Shivvers (R)
18th	June 20, 1969	Kenneth Benda (R)	Joann Yessler Orr (D)
1st	September 9, 1969	Seeley G. Lodwick (R)	Wilson L. Davis (R)
45th	October 28, 1969	Walter B. Hammer (R)	S. J. Brownlee (R)
14th	November 15, 1969	David M. Stanley (R)	W. R. Rabedeaux (R)
6th	November 18, 1969	Charles Vernon Lisle (R)	Earl Bass (R)
12th	December 16, 1969	Joseph Flatt (R)	Glen E. Bortell (R)
22nd	December 1970	J. Donald Weimer (D) (Note: J. Donald Weimer won the general election in district 22 in 1970; however, Weimer did not take office. Robinson won a special election to the seat.)	Cloyd E. Robinson (D)
47th	December 1972	James B. Turner (R) (Note: James Turner won the general election in district 47 in 1972; however, Turner was deceased and this necessitated a special election.)	Richard R. Ramsey (R)
10th	November 5, 1974	Mike Blouin (D)	Robert M. "Bob" Carr (D)
15th	November 2, 1976	Steve Sovern (D)	Bob Rush (D)
11th	December 28, 1976	Richard John Norpel (D)	Steve Bisenius (R)
41st	December 28, 1976	Bill Gluba (D)	Forrest F. Ashcraft (R)
36th	November 8, 1983	Michael R. Lura (R)	John Soorholtz (R)
45th	September 10, 1985	Norman Rodgers (D)	James R. Riordan (D)
34th	December 17, 1985	John A. Neighbour (D)	John A. Peterson (D)
31st	January 7, 1986	Lowell Junkins (D)	Gene Fraise (D)
13th	January 28, 1986	Thomas A. Lind (R)	Jim Lind (R)
18th	September 26, 1989	Robert M. Carr (D)	Mike Connolly (D)
12th	December 18, 1990	Joy Corning (R)	Harry G. Slife (R)
44th	December 17, 1991	Jack Nystrom (R)	Albert Sorensen (D)
12th	August 31, 1993	Harry G. Slife (R)	Donald Redfern (R)
5th	February 22, 1994	Linn Fuhrman (R)	Mary Lou Freeman (R)
25th	February 22, 1994	Richard J. Varn (D)	Robert Dvorsky (D)
26th	December 20, 1994	Paul Pate (R)	Mary Lundby (R)
13th	April 1997 (Note: Senator Jim Lind (R) resigned in March 1997. In a special election in April 1997, Patricia "Pat" Harper (D) won a special election in Iowa Senate, District 13. The Iowa General Assembly's website notes Lind's resignation & Harper's elevation to the position, but the Iowa Secretary of State's website does not list election data for this seat as of April 11, 2020. I can only find an article in the Waterloo, IA local newspaper documenting the special election victory for Harper.)	Jim Lind (R)	Patricia M. "Pat" Harper (D)
8th	February 3, 1998	James E. Black (R)	E. Thurman Gaskill (R)
46th	January 12, 1999	Patty Judge (D)	John Judge (D)
43rd	June 12, 2001	Derryl McLaren (R)	Hubert Houser (R)
39th	February 19, 2002	Jo Ann M. Johnson (R)	David G. Lord (R)
10th	March 12, 2002	Merlin Bartz (R)	Amanda Ragan (D)
26th	January 14, 2003	Steve King (R) (Note: Following the 2000 Census and 2002 redistricting, King would have been redistricted from state senate district 6 to district 26; however, he was elected to the US Congress in 2002, thus necessitating a special election in the Iowa Senate.)	Steve Kettering (R)
30th	February 3, 2004	Mary Kramer (R)	Pat Ward (R)
48th	January 4, 2011	Kim Reynolds (R)	Joni Ernst (R)
35th	January 18, 2011	Larry Noble (R)	Jack Whitver (R)
18th	November 8, 2011	Swati Dandekar (D)	Liz Mathis (D)
22nd	December 11, 2012	Pat Ward (R) (Note: Senator Ward had been redistricted from district 30 to 22 following the 2010 Census and 2011 redistricting process. She was running for re-election to in the newly-numbered district 22 when she died less than a month before the 2012 general election. She 'won' the 2012 general election for district 22 posthumously. Thus necessitating this special election. This explains why the election of Senator Schneider is considered a hold for Republicans, even though the immediately preceding senator from district 22 was technically a Democrat. Given the intricacies of renumbering after the redistricting process, he technically succeeded the posthumously re-elected Senator Ward.)	Charles Schneider (R)
13th	November 19, 2013	Kent Sorenson (R)	Julian Garrett (R)
12th	December 30, 2014	Joni Ernst (R)	Mark Costello (R)
45th	December 27, 2016	Joe Seng (D)	Jim Lykam (D)
3rd	December 12, 2017	Bill Anderson (R)	Jim Carlin (R)
25th	April 10, 2018	Bill Dix (R)	Annette Sweeney (R)
30th	March 19, 2019	Jeff Danielson (D)	Eric Giddens (D)
41st	January 26, 2021	Mariannette Miller-Meeks (R)	Adrian Dickey (R)
35th	January 28, 2025	Chris Cournoyer (R)	Mike Zimmer (D)
1st	August 26, 2025	Rocky De Witt (R)	Catelin Drey (D)
16th	December 30, 2025	Claire Celsi (D)	Renee Hardman (D)

== Results ==
=== 1913: District 39 ===
Iowa Senate, District 39 Special Election, February 17, 1913
Party	Candidate	Votes	%
Democratic	F. P. Hagemann	2,670	53.50%
Republican	Benjamin Boardman	1,490	29.85%
Progressive	Harry A. Morey	831	16.65%
Total votes		4,991	100.0
Democratic gain from Republican			

=== 1923: District 37 ===
Iowa Senate, District 37 Special Election, March 31, 1923
Party	Candidate	Votes	%
Democratic	William Schmedika	2,006	54.88%
Republican	Rube McFeren	1,649	45.12%
Total votes		3,655	100.0
Democratic gain from Republican			

=== 1933: District 4 ===
Iowa Senate, District 4 Special Election, February 1, 1933
Party	Candidate	Votes	%
Democratic	Joseph E. Doze	3,047	54.2
Republican	H. C. Condra	2,579	45.8
Total votes		5,626	100.0
Democratic hold			

=== 1933: District 29 ===
Iowa Senate, District 29 Special Election, March 24, 1933
Party	Candidate	Votes	%
Democratic	D. Myron Tripp	3,756	55.6
Republican	John E. Cross	2,999	44.4
Total votes		6,755	100.0
Democratic hold			

=== 1933: District 35 ===
Iowa Senate, District 35 Special Election, August 22, 1933
Party	Candidate	Votes	%
Democratic	Howard Baldwin	936	100.0
Total votes		936	100.0
Democratic hold			

=== 1933: District 45 ===
Iowa Senate, District 45 Special Election, October 3, 1933
Party	Candidate	Votes	%
Republican	Richard V. Leo	6,718	52.1
Democratic	M. W. Hyland	6,181	47.9
Total votes		12,899	100.0
Republican gain from Democratic			

=== 1944: District 2 ===
Iowa Senate, District 2 Special Election, January 17, 1944
Party	Candidate	Votes	%
Republican	Charles W. Wade	1,464	73.1
Democratic	S.C. Simmons	540	26.9
Total votes		2,004	100.0
Republican hold			

=== 1944: District 5 ===
Iowa Senate, District 5 Special Election, January 17, 1944
Party	Candidate	Votes	%
Republican	T.M. Thompson	904	100.0
Total votes		904	100.0
Republican hold			

=== 1945: District 28 ===
Iowa Senate, District 28 Special Election, January 26, 1945
Party	Candidate	Votes	%
Republican	Robert A. Rockhill	1,783	72.9
Democratic	C. E. Wicklund	663	27.1
Total votes		2,446	100.0
Republican hold			

=== 1947: District 37 ===
Iowa Senate, District 37 Special Election, January 6, 1947
Party	Candidate	Votes	%
Republican	R. R. Bateson	2,440	47.8
Democratic	Frank J. Lund	2,258	44.2
Independent	William Schmedika	409	8.0
Total votes		5,107	100.0
Republican hold			

=== 1963: District 15 ===
Iowa Senate, District 15 Special Election, January 10, 1963
Party	Candidate	Votes	%
Republican	Vera H. Shivvers	2,921	53.0
Democratic	Howard H. Myers	2,586	47.0
Total votes		5,507	100.0
Republican hold			

=== 1970: District 22 ===
Iowa Senate, District 22 Special Election, December 1970
Party	Candidate	Votes	%
Democratic	Cloyd E. Robinson (Note: Democratic Senator J. Donald Weimer was redistricted from district 24 to 22 and Weimer won the 22nd district general election in November 1970. However, he did not take office. In a special election in December, Democrat Cloyd E. Robinson won and kept the seat for the Democratic Party.)	2,782	55.8
Republican	Jesse G. Hunter	2,201	44.2
Total votes		4,983	100.0
Democratic hold			

=== 1972: District 47 ===
Iowa Senate, District 47 Special Election, December 1972
Party	Candidate	Votes	%
Republican	Richard Ramsey	4,016	50.2
Democratic	Arlo Hullinger	3,989	49.8
Total votes		8,005	100.0
Republican hold			

=== 1974: District 10 ===
Iowa Senate, District 10 Special Election, November 5, 1974
Party	Candidate	Votes	%
Democratic	Robert M. "Bob" Carr	6,273	59.5
Republican	James L. Esmoil	4,270	40.5
Total votes		10,543	100.0
Democratic hold			

=== 1976: District 15 ===
Iowa Senate, District 15 Special Election, November 2, 1976
Party	Candidate	Votes	%
Democratic	Bob Rush	13,777	59.8
Republican	Andrew Gordon Holmes	9,254	40.2
Total votes		23,031	100.0
Democratic hold			

=== 1976: District 11 ===
Iowa Senate, District 11 Special Election, December 28, 1976
Party	Candidate	Votes	%
Republican	Steve Bisenius	3,925	50.8
Democratic	Maurice Hennessey	3,800	49.2
Total votes		7,725	100.0
Republican gain from Democratic			

=== 1976: District 41 ===
Iowa Senate, District 41 Special Election, December 28, 1976
Party	Candidate	Votes	%
Republican	Forrest F. Ashcraft	3,028	61.6
Democratic	Michael McDonald	1,886	38.4
Total votes		4,914	100.0
Republican gain from Democratic			

=== 1983: District 36 ===
Iowa Senate, District 36 Special Election, November 8, 1983
Party	Candidate	Votes	%
Republican	John Soorholtz	6,525	50.1
Democratic	Tom Swartz	6,492	49.9
Total votes		13,017	100.0
Republican hold			

=== 1985: District 45 ===
Iowa Senate, District 45 Special Election, September 10, 1985
Party	Candidate	Votes	%
Democratic	Jim R. Riordan	6,720	51.2
Republican	Don Lienemann	5,931	45.2
Populist	Johnny E. Vogel	472	3.6
Total votes		13,123	100.0
Democratic hold			

=== 1985: District 34 ===
Iowa Senate, District 34 Special Election, December 17, 1985
Party	Candidate	Votes	%
Democratic	John A. Peterson	3,709	60.5
Republican	Bill G. Anders	2,423	39.5
Total votes		6,132	100.0
Democratic hold			

=== 1986: District 31 ===
Iowa Senate, District 31 Special Election, January 7, 1986
Party	Candidate	Votes	%
Democratic	Gene Fraise	3,972	55.3
Republican	Judson B. Seeley	3,212	44.7
Total votes		7,184	100.0
Democratic hold			

=== 1986: District 13 ===
Iowa Senate, District 13 Special Election, January 28, 1986
Party	Candidate	Votes	%
Republican	Jim Lind	5,947	53.5
Democratic	Steve Rapp	5,159	46.5
Total votes		11,106	100.0
Republican hold			

=== 1989: District 18 ===
Iowa Senate, District 18 Special Election, September 26, 1989
Party	Candidate	Votes	%
Democratic	Mike Connolly	4,601	100.0
Total votes		4,601	100.0
Democratic hold			

=== 1990: District 12 ===
Iowa Senate, District 12 Special Election, December 18, 1990
Party	Candidate	Votes	%
Republican	Harry Slife	4,734	58.8
Democratic	Rose Angel	3,313	41.2
Total votes		8,047	100.0
Republican hold			

=== 1991: District 44 ===
Iowa Senate, District 44 Special Election, December 17, 1991
Party	Candidate	Votes	%
Democratic	Albert Sorensen	4,588	59.3
Republican	George Maybee	3,143	40.7
Total votes		7,731	100.0
Democratic gain from Republican			

=== 1993: District 12 ===
Iowa Senate, District 12 Special Election, August 31, 1993
Party	Candidate	Votes	%
Republican	Donald Redfern	6,863	54.3
Democratic	Sandra Glenn	5,776	45.7
Total votes		12,639	100.0
Republican hold			

=== 1994: District 5 ===
Iowa Senate, District 5 Special Election, February 22, 1994
Party	Candidate	Votes	%
Republican	Mary Lou Freeman	4,212	61.1
Democratic	Donald Schossow	2,680	38.9
Total votes		6,892	100.0
Republican hold			

=== 1994: District 25 ===
Iowa Senate, District 25 Special Election, February 22, 1994
Party	Candidate	Votes	%
Democratic	Robert Dvorsky	2,073	54.0
Republican	Rosie Dalton	1,763	46.0
Total votes		3,836	100.0
Democratic hold			

=== 1994: District 26 ===
Iowa Senate, District 26 Special Election, December 20, 1994
Party	Candidate	Votes	%
Republican	Mary Lundby	4,170	59.1
Democratic	Charlie Brown	2,890	40.9
Total votes		7,060	100.0
Republican hold			

=== 1998: District 8 ===
Iowa Senate, District 8 Special Election, February 3, 1998
Party	Candidate	Votes	%
Republican	E. Thurman Gaskill	5,647	54.7
Democratic	Christine G. Louscher	3,907	37.8
Independent	Paul Bernhard	770	7.5
Total votes		10,324	100.0
Republican hold			

=== 1999: District 46 ===
Iowa Senate, District 46 Special Election, January 12, 1999
Party	Candidate	Votes	%
Democratic	John Judge	4,494	47.9
Republican	Claude Neill	4,377	46.6
Reform	Garry Lee Klicker	514	5.5
Total votes		9,385	100.0
Democratic hold			

=== 2001: District 43 ===
Iowa Senate, District 43 Special Election, June 12, 2001
Party	Candidate	Votes	%
Republican	Hubert Houser	4,144	71.8
Democratic	John J. O'Brien	1,630	28.2
Total votes		5,774	100.0
Republican hold			

=== 2002: District 39 ===
Iowa Senate, District 39 Special Election, February 19, 2002
Party	Candidate	Votes	%
Republican	David G. Lord	3,475	70.8
Democratic	Steve Shelley	1,433	29.2
Total votes		4,908	100.0
Republican hold			

=== 2002: District 10 ===
Iowa Senate, District 10 Special Election, March 12, 2002
Party	Candidate	Votes	%
Democratic	Amanda Ragan	6,453	62.8
Republican	Mary Ellen Miller	3,554	34.6
Independent	Kevin Smith	262	2.6
Total votes		10,269	100.0
Democratic gain from Republican			

=== 2003: District 26 ===
Iowa Senate, District 26 Special Election, January 14, 2003
Party	Candidate	Votes	%
Republican	Steve Kettering	4,461	59.8
Democratic	Don Mason	3,000	40.2
Total votes		7,461	100.0
Republican hold			

=== 2004: District 30 ===
Iowa Senate, District 30 Special Election, February 3, 2004
Party	Candidate	Votes	%
Republican	Pat Ward	4,037	55.0
Democratic	Alicia Claypool	3,073	41.8
Independent	Eric Kinman	192	2.6
Independent	Satro Narayan	42	0.6
Total votes		7,344	100.0
Republican hold			

=== 2011: District 48 ===
Iowa Senate, District 48 Special Election, January 4, 2011
Party	Candidate	Votes	%
Republican	Joni Ernst	4,990	67.5
Democratic	Ruth Smith	2,407	32.5
Total votes		7,397	100.0
Republican hold			

=== 2011: District 35 ===
Iowa Senate, District 35 Special Election, January 18, 2011
Party	Candidate	Votes	%
Republican	Jack Whitver	4,773	63.5
Democratic	John Calhoun	2,739	36.5
Total votes		7,512	100.0
Republican hold			

=== 2011: District 18 ===
Iowa Senate, District 18 Special Election, November 8, 2011
Party	Candidate	Votes	%
Democratic	Liz Mathis	13,324	56.0
Republican	Cindy Golding	10,322	43.4
Constitution	Jon Tack	151	0.6
Total votes		23,797	100.0
Democratic hold			

=== 2012: District 22 ===
Iowa Senate, District 22 Special Election, December 11, 2012
Party	Candidate	Votes	%
Republican	Charles Schneider	5,378	56.5
Democratic	Desmund Adams	4,136	43.5
Total votes		9,514	100.0
Republican hold			

=== 2013: District 13 ===
Iowa Senate, District 13 Special Election, November 19, 2013
Party	Candidate	Votes	%
Republican	Julian Garrett	4,908	58.2
Democratic	Mark Davitt	3,522	41.8
Total votes		8,430	100.0
Republican hold			

=== 2014: District 12 ===
Iowa Senate, District 12 Special Election, December 30, 2014
Party	Candidate	Votes	%
Republican	Mark Costello	3,138	74.7
Democratic	Steven L. Adams	932	22.2
Libertarian	Don W. Brantz	132	3.1
Total votes		4,202	100.0
Republican hold			

=== 2016: District 45 ===
Iowa Senate, District 45 Special Election, December 27, 2016
Party	Candidate	Votes	%
Democratic	Jim Lykam	3,803	73.2
Republican	Michael Gonzales	1,315	25.3
Libertarian	Severin B. Gilbert	77	1.5
Total votes		5,195	100.0
Democratic hold			

=== 2017: District 3 ===
Iowa Senate, District 3 Special Election, December 12, 2017
Party	Candidate	Votes	%
Republican	Jim Carlin	3,707	54.6
Democratic	Todd Wendt	3,083	45.4
Total votes		6,790	100.0
Republican hold			

=== 2018: District 25 ===
Iowa Senate, District 25 Special Election, April 10, 2018
Party	Candidate	Votes	%
Republican	Annette Sweeney	5,211	60.5
Democratic	Tracy Freese	3,397	39.5
Total votes		8,608	100.0
Republican hold			

=== 2019: District 30 ===
Iowa Senate, District 30 Special Election, March 19, 2019
Party	Candidate	Votes	%
Democratic	Eric Giddens	7,611	56.8
Republican	Walt Rogers	5,635	42.1
Libertarian	Fred Perryman	143	1.1
Total votes		13,389	100.0
Democratic hold			

=== 2021: District 41 ===
Iowa Senate, District 41 Special Election, January 26, 2021
Party	Candidate	Votes	%
Republican	Adrian Dickey	5,091	55.32%
Democratic	Mary Stewart	4,111	44.68%
Total votes		9,202	100.0
Republican hold			

=== 2025: District 35 ===
Iowa Senate, District 35 Special Election, January 28, 2025
Party	Candidate	Votes	%
Democratic	Mike Zimmer	4,812	51.72%
Republican	Katie Elizabeth Whittington	4,473	48.08%
Write-in		19	0.20%
Total votes		9,304	100.0%
Democratic gain from Republican			

=== 2025: District 1 ===
Iowa Senate, District 1 Special Election, August 26, 2025
Party	Candidate	Votes	%
Democratic	Catelin Drey	4,212	55.21%
Republican	Christopher A. Prosch	3,412	44.72%
Write-in		5	0.07%
Total votes		7,629	100.0%
Democratic gain from Republican			

=== 2025: District 16 ===
Iowa Senate, District 16 Special Election, December 30, 2025
Party	Candidate	Votes	%
Democratic	Renee Hardman	7,341	71.40%
Republican	Lucas Loftin	2,930	28.50%
Write-in		11	0.11%
Total votes		10,282	100.0%
Democratic hold			
