= Senator Maddox =

Senator Maddox may refer to:

- Gene Maddox (1938–2015), Iowa State Senate
- Jim Maddox (1938–2024), Oklahoma State Senate
- John W. Maddox (1848–1922), Georgia State Senate

== See also ==
- Jared Maddux (1911–1971), Tennessee State Senate
