= John Groninga =

American politician (1945–2025)

Member of the Iowa House of Representatives from the 20th district
- In office January 10, 1983 – January 10, 1993
- Preceded by: Mike Connolly
- Succeeded by: Dennis May

Personal details
- Born: May 5, 1945 Hackensack, New Jersey, U.S.
- Died: January 24, 2025 (aged 79) Mason City, Iowa, U.S.
- Party: Democratic

John D. Groninga (May 5, 1945 – January 24, 2025) was an American politician who served in the Iowa House of Representatives from the 20th district from 1983 to 1993.

== Death ==
He died in Mason City, Iowa, on January 24, 2025, at the age of 79.
