= Thomas Townsend (Iowa politician) =

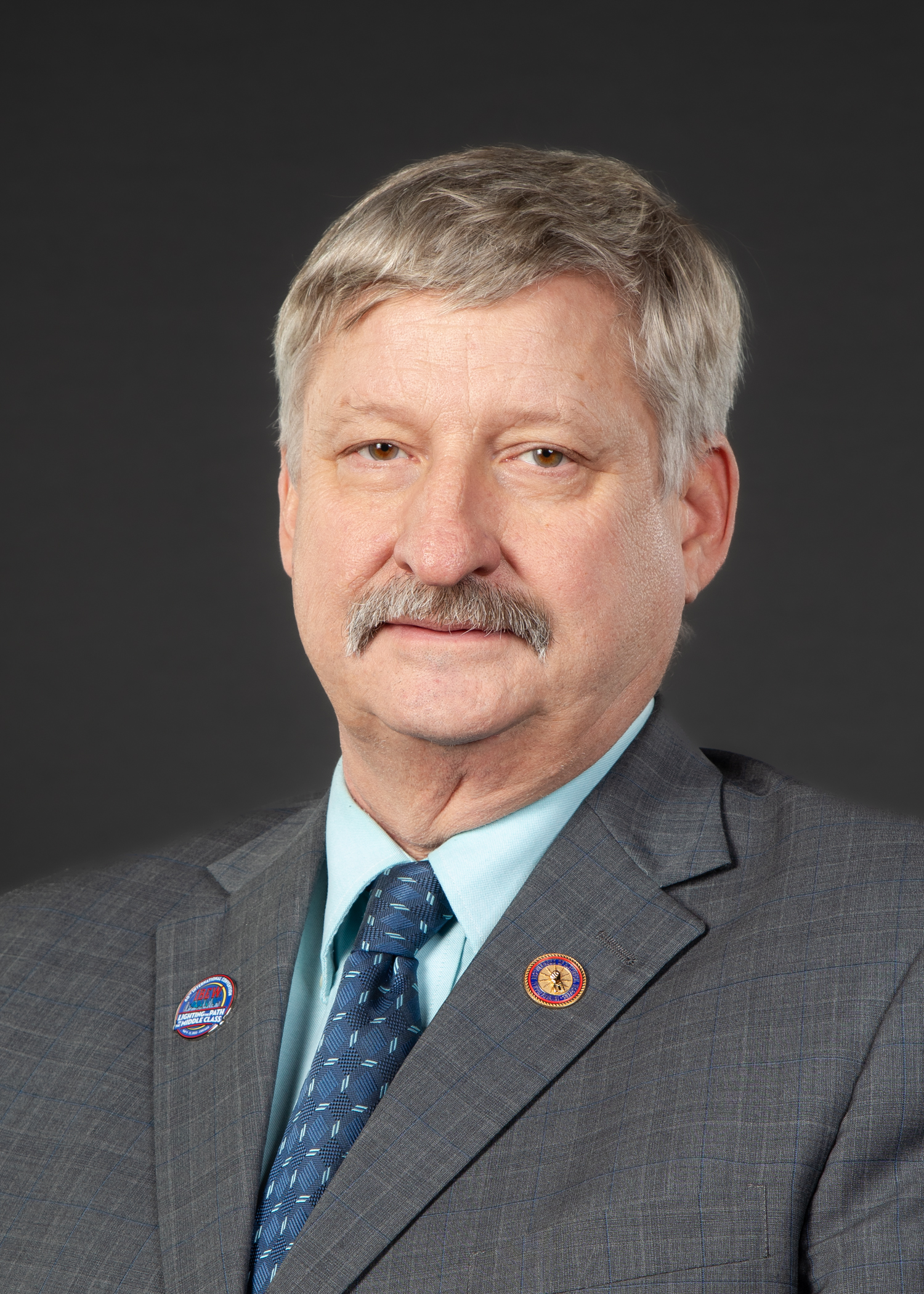
Thomas Townsend

Thomas Townsend (born c. 1967) is an American politician.

Prior to pursuing political office, Townsend served in the United States Navy for six years, then apprenticed as an electrician for five years before receiving his license in 1997. He is a member of the International Brotherhood of Electrical Workers and president of the Dubuque Federation of Labor, affiliated with the AFL–CIO.

Following the retirement of Pam Jochum, Townsend was elected as a Democrat to represent District 36 of the Iowa Senate in November 2024, defeating Republican candidate Nick Molo 50.5% to 49.5%.
