= Amanda Ragan =

American politician

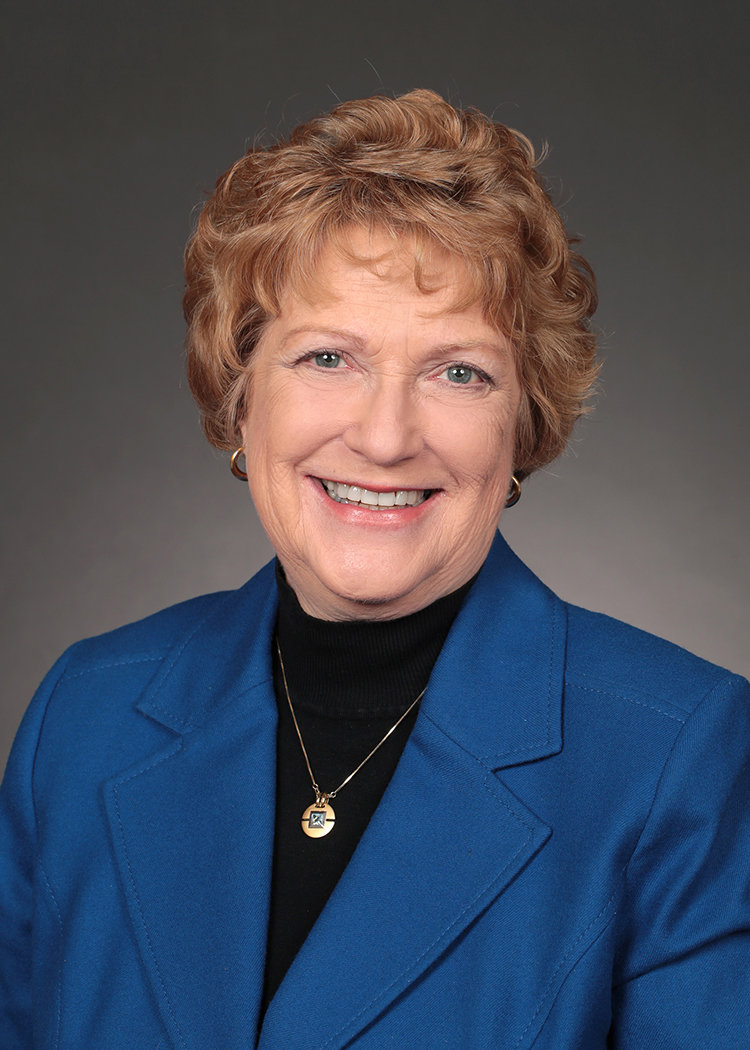

Member of the Iowa Senate from the 27th district 10th (2002 – 2013)
- Incumbent
- Assumed office March 18, 2002
- Preceded by: Merlin Bartz

Personal details
- Born: September 20, 1954 (age 71) Mason City, Iowa, U.S.
- Party: Democratic
- Website: Amanda Ragan for Iowa Senate

Amanda Ragan (born September 20, 1954) is an Iowan State Senator from the 27th District. A member of the Democratic Party, she has served in the Iowa Senate since 2002. In 2016 Ragan was appointed Iowa Senate Democratic Whip. She has also served as the Executive Director of Meals on Wheels and of Community Kitchen of Northern Iowa.

Ragan served on several committees in the Iowa Senate – the Appropriation committee; the Natural Resources committee; the Rules and Administration committee; the Veterans Affairs committee; and the Human Resources committee, where she is chair. She also serves on the Health and Human Services Appropriations Subcommittee, where she is vice chair.

== Iowa State Senate ==
Ragan is currently an assistant majority leader in the Senate. Ragan first joined the Senate when she won a special election to fill the vacancy caused by Republican Senator Merlin Bartz's resignation.

In 2005 Ragan was targeted by several groups for her opposition to a proposed amendment banning gay marriage in the state of Iowa.

Ragan was re-elected in 2006 with 15,138 votes (70%), defeating Republican opponent Kenneth D. Young.

In 2008 as chair of the Senate Human Resources Committee Ragan was a direct player in the formulation of health care legislation that would cover more Iowan children and fix health care problems in the state of Iowa.

Ragan was again re-election to the Iowa State Senate in 2010. Ragan defeated Republican candidate James Mills by a margin of 12,908 (60.4%) to 8,452 (39.4%).

Iowa Senate
Preceded by Merlin Bartz	10th District; March 18, 2002 – January 10, 2005	Succeeded by Donald Redfern
Preceded by Mike Sexton	7th District; January 10, 2005 – January 14, 2013	Succeeded by Rick Bertrand
