= Larry McKibben =

American politician (1947–2025)

Larry E. McKibben
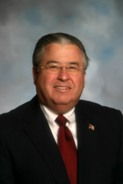

Member of the Iowa Senate from the 22nd district 32nd (1997-2003)
- In office January 13, 1997 – 2010
- Preceded by: Randal Giannetto
- Succeeded by: Steve Sodders

Personal details
- Born: January 5, 1947 Marshalltown, Iowa, U.S.
- Died: November 9, 2025 (aged 78) Marshalltown, Iowa, U.S.
- Party: Republican
- Spouse: Marki
- Occupation: Lawyer
- Website: McKibben's website

Larry E. McKibben (January 5, 1947 – November 9, 2025) was an American politician and an Iowa State Senator from the 22nd District. He served in the Iowa Senate from 1997 and was an assistant minority leader until he retired in 2008.

== Life and career ==
McKibben received his B.A. (1970) from the University of Northern Iowa and his J.D. (1972) from the University of Iowa College of Law. He was admitted to the Iowa bar in 1973. McKibben served on several committees in the Iowa Senate - the Commerce committee; the State Government committee; the Veterans Affairs committee; the Judiciary committee, where he was ranking member; and the Ways and Means committee, where he was ranking member. He also served on the Transportation, Infrastructure, and Capitals Appropriations Subcommittee. McKibben was a candidate for the United States House of Representatives, District 3, in 1998. McKibben was re-elected in 2004 with 14,185 votes (51%), defeating Democratic opponent Wayne Sawtelle. He did not rerun in the 2008 Iowa Senate elections. From 2013 to 2019, McKibben served as a member of the Iowa Board of Regents. In 2017, he considered running for the board presidency, as Bruce Rastetter decided to step down. Michael Richards was elected to succeed Rastetter as board president.

McKibben died on November 9, 2025, at the age of 78.

== Publications ==
- Granting Parole in Iowa: A Time for Change, Iowa Advocate, Vol. X, No. 3, Spring, 1972

Iowa Senate
Preceded by Randal Giannetto	32nd District; 1997–2003	Succeeded by Jack Hovleck
Preceded by Patrick Deluhery	22nd District; 2003–2008	Succeeded by Steve Sodders
