= Iowa's 32nd Senate district =

American legislative district

Senate District 32
- Type: District of the Upper House
- Location: Northeast Iowa
- Senator: Mike Klimesh (R)
- Parent organization: Iowa General Assembly

The 32nd District of the Iowa Senate is located in northeast Iowa, and is currently composed of Howard, Winneshiek, Allamakee, and Clayton counties, as well as part of Fayette County and Dubuque counties.

== Current elected officials ==
Mike Klimesh is the senator currently representing the 32nd District.

The area of the 32nd District contains two Iowa House of Representatives districts:

- The 63rd District (represented by Michael Bergan)
- The 64th District (represented by Anne Osmundson)

The district is also located in Iowa's 2nd congressional district, which is represented by Ashley Hinson.

== Past senators ==
The district has previously been represented by:

- Forrest Schwengels, 1983–1988
- H. Kay Hedge, 1989–1992
- Randal Giannetto, 1993–1996
- Larry McKibben, 1997–2002
- Jack Holveck, 2003–2004
- Brad Zaun, 2005–2012
- Brian Schoenjahn, 2013–2016
- Craig Johnson, 2017–2023

== Recent election results from statewide races ==
Year	Office	Results
2008	President	Obama 58–39%
2012	President	Obama 55–45%
2016	President	Trump 55–39%
2016	Senate	Grassley 63–33%
2018	Governor	Reynolds 55–41%
2018	Attorney General	Miller 78–22%
2018	Secretary of State	Pate 58–40%
2018	Treasurer	Fitzgerald 53–44%
2018	Auditor	Sand 52–46%
2020	President	Trump 60–39%
2020	Senate	Ernst 57–40%
2022	Senate	Grassley 62–38%
2022	Governor	Reynolds 66–32%
2022	Attorney General	Bird 55–45%
2022	Secretary of State	Pate 67–33%
2022	Treasurer	Smith 56–44%
2022	Auditor	Halbur 51–49%
2024	President	Trump 62–36%

== See also ==
- Iowa General Assembly
- Iowa Senate
