= Michael Lura =

American politician (1948–2004)

Michael R. Lura (24 August 1948 – 4 May 2004) was an American politician.

Lura was born in Marshalltown, Iowa, on 24 August 1948, to parents Geahard R. Lura and Opal M. Herbert. He graduated from Marshalltown High School in 1966 and married Susan Revell the next year. The couple raised four children. Lura served in the United States Army for four years during the Vietnam War. He studied accounting at Columbus College and worked for the Mississippi Gaming Commission as well as the Iowa Racing and Gaming Commission.

Lura was a Republican precinct committeeman for four years before serving the Marshall County Republican Party as finance chair from 1977 to 1978. He contested the legislative elections in November 1978, and won election to the Iowa House of Representatives from District 39. In 1981, Lura was seated to the Iowa Senate, as the legislator representing District 20. In 1983, he was redistricted to represent District 36. Lura's resignation from the seat took effect on 30 June 1983. He moved to Las Vegas, Nevada, with his wife, and at the time of his death on 4 May 2004, was working for the Flamingo Hotel and Casino.
