= Iowa's 36th Senate district =

American legislative district

Iowa's 36th State Senate district
Senator
Thomas Townsend; D–Dubuque

The 36th District of the Iowa Senate is located in northeastern Iowa, and is currently composed of part of Dubuque County.

== Current elected officials ==
Thomas Townsend is the senator currently representing the 36th District.

The area of the 36th District contains two Iowa House of Representatives districts:

- The 71st District (represented by Lindsay James)
- The 72nd District (represented by Jennifer Smith)

The district is also located in Iowa's 2nd congressional district, which is represented by Ashley Hinson.

== Past senators ==
The district has previously been represented by:

- C. Joseph Coleman, 1965–1967
- Michael Lura, 1983
- John Soorholtz, 1984–1992
- Elaine Szymoniak, 1993–2000
- Jack Holveck, 2001–2002
- Paul McKinley, 2003–2012
- Steve Sodders, 2013–2016
- Jeff Edler, 2017–2023
- Pam Jochum, 2023–2025
- Thomas Townsend, 2025-present

== Recent election results from statewide races ==
Year	Office	Results
2008	President	Obama 63–36%
2012	President	Obama 61–39%
2016	President	Clinton 51–42%
2016	Senate	Grassley 51–45%
2018	Governor	Hubbell 55–42%
2018	Attorney General	Miller 79–21%
2018	Secretary of State	DeJear 54–43%
2018	Treasurer	Fitzgerald 61–36%
2018	Auditor	Sand 61–37%
2020	President	Biden 53–44%
2020	Senate	Greenfield 53–43%
2022	Senate	Franken 53–47%
2022	Governor	Reynolds 50–47%
2022	Attorney General	Miller 57–43%
2022	Secretary of State	Pate 51–49%
2022	Treasurer	Fitzgerald 55–45%
2022	Auditor	Sand 58–42%
2024	President	Harris 51–48%

== See also ==
- Iowa General Assembly
- Iowa Senate
