= John Redwine =

American politician (born 1950)

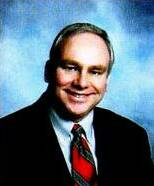
John Redwine's official portrait as part of the 79th Iowa General Assembly

John Redwine (born October 28, 1950) is an American physician and politician from Iowa.

== Biography ==
Born in Pratt, Kansas, Redwine received his bachelor's degree from University of Kansas, He then went to the University of Texas Health Science Center at Houston and Kansas City University of Medicine and Biosciences. He practiced osteopathetic medicine in Sioux City, Iowa where he lived. Redwine served on the Sioux City Community School Board. From 1997 to 2003, Redwine served in the Iowa Senate from the 2nd District, and was a Republican. He ran in the Republican primary for Iowa's 5th congressional district in 2002, but was eliminated in the first round.
