= Wayne D. Bennett =

American politician (1927–2015)

Member of the Iowa Senate from the 6th district
- In office January 11, 1993 – January 12, 1997
- Preceded by: Jack Kibbie
- Succeeded by: Steve King

Member of the Iowa House of Representatives from the 4th district
- In office January 10, 1983 – January 10, 1993
- Preceded by: Lee Warren Holt
- Succeeded by: Ralph Klemme

Member of the Iowa House of Representatives from the 48th district
- In office January 8, 1973 – January 9, 1983
- Preceded by: Harold C. McCormick
- Succeeded by: Darrell Hanson

Personal details
- Born: Wayne Dresden Bennett; November 7, 1927 Schaller, Iowa, U.S.
- Died: September 3, 2015 (aged 87) Ida Grove, Iowa, U.S.
- Party: Republican
- Spouse(s): Barbara Noll; Lois Trieschman
- Education: Iowa State University
- Occupation: farmer

Wayne Dresden Bennett (November 7, 1927 – September 3, 2015) was an American politician in the state of Iowa.

Bennett was born in Schaller, Iowa. He attended Iowa State University and was a farmer. Bennett served in the Iowa House from 1973 to 1993 for district 48 from 1973 to 1983 and district 4 from 1983 to 1993. Bennett was also a state senator from the 6th district from 1993 to 1997. He died on September 3, 2015.
