= Mary Lundby =

American (Iowa) state politician (1948-2009)

Mary Adelaide Lundby
- Lundby in 2003

Member of the Iowa Senate from the 18th district 26th (1995 – 2003)
- In office January 9, 1995 – January 12, 2009
- Preceded by: Paul Pate
- Succeeded by: Swati Dandekar

Member of the Iowa House of Representatives from the 51st district 47th (1987 – 1993)
- In office January 12, 1987 – January 9, 1995
- Preceded by: Mike Oxley
- Succeeded by: Rosemary Thomson

Personal details
- Born: February 2, 1948 Carroll, Iowa, U.S.
- Died: January 17, 2009 (aged 60)
- Party: Republican
- Children: 1
- Education: Upper Iowa University
- Website: Lundby's website

Mary Adelaide Lundby (née Hoehl; February 2, 1948 – January 17, 2009) was an American politician who served in the Iowa General Assembly from 1987 to 2009 as a member of the Republican Party.

== Early life and education ==
Mary Adelaide Hoehl was born on February 2, 1948, in Carroll, Iowa. She graduated from Kuemper Catholic High School in 1966 and received a Bachelor of Arts in political science and history from Upper Iowa University in 1971.

== Political career ==
Prior to her election to the Iowa House, Lundby served as the co-chair of the Linn County Republican Party, as a member of the Linn County Republican Central Committee, and as a staff assistant to then-senator Roger Jepsen.

Lundby was first elected to the Iowa House of Representatives from the 51st district in 1986, and was reelected in 1988, 1990, and 1992. In 1994, she was elected to the Iowa Senate from the 26th district to fill the vacancy left by Paul Pate's resignation, and was reelected in 1996, 2000, and 2004. She declined to run for reelection in 2008, opting to run for Linn County supervisor instead. She withdrew from the supervisor race in June 2008 due to her worsening cancer diagnosis.

Lundby served as Minority Leader of the Iowa Senate from 2006 to 2007 and as Co-Majority Leader in 2006. She also served as Speaker pro Tempore of the Iowa House from 1992 to 1994. She also served on several committees in the Iowa Senate, incluing the Government Oversight committee, the Natural Resources and Environment committee, and the Rules and Administration Committee.

== Personal life ==
Lundby married Michael Lundby in 1971 and moved to Marion, Iowa, where she resided for the rest of her life. They had one child, Daniel Lundby, who was later elected to the Iowa House of Representatives in 2012.

Lundby died on January 17, 2009, at the age of 60 after a three-year battle with cervical cancer.

Political offices
Preceded by ??	Speaker pro Tempore of the Iowa House of Representatives; 1993 – 1995	Succeeded by ??
Party political offices
Preceded by Stewart Iverson	Co-Majority Leader of the Iowa Senate; 2006 serving alongside Mike Gronstal	Succeeded by Mike Gronstal as Majority Leader & Mary Lundby as Minority Leader
Preceded by Mary Lundby (R) & Mike Gronstal (D) as Co-Majority Leaders	Minority Leader of the Iowa Senate; 2006 – 2007	Succeeded by Ron Wieck
Iowa House of Representatives
Preceded by Mike Oxley	47th District; 1987 – 1993	Succeeded by Barry Brauns
Preceded by Philip Brammer	51st District; 1993 – 1995	Succeeded by Rosemary Thomson
Iowa Senate
Preceded by Paul Pate	26th District; 1995 – 2003	Succeeded by Steve Kettering
Preceded by Mike Connolly	18th District; 2003 – 2009	Succeeded by Swati Dandekar
