= Patrick J. Deluhery =

American politician (born 1942)

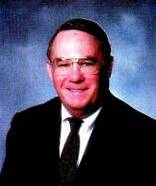

Member of the Iowa Senate from the 22nd district 21st (1983–1993) 41st (1979–1983)
- In office January 11, 1993 – January 12, 2003
- Succeeded by: Larry McKibben

Personal details
- Born: January 31, 1942 (age 84) Birmingham, Alabama, U.S.
- Party: Democrat
- Spouse: Margaret Morris
- Occupation: College teacher

Patrick J. Deluhery (born January 31, 1942) is an American academic and politician from Iowa. He served in the Iowa Senate from 1979 to 2003, and was a longtime instructor at St. Ambrose University.

== Biography ==
Patrick J. Deluhery was born in Birmingham, Alabama, on January 31, 1942, to Frank B. and Lucille (Donovan) Deluhery. He grew up in Davenport, Iowa, and attended schools there, graduating from Assumption High School in 1960. He matriculated at the University of Notre Dame in South Bend, Indiana, and graduated with honors in 1964 with a Bachelor of arts. He studied at the London School of Economics and graduated with a Bachelor of Science in 1967.

Returning to Davenport, Deluhery was named a teacher in the Department of Economics and Business Administration at St. Ambrose University. In 1969, Deluhery took a position as a legislative assistant to Senator Harold Hughes. In 1973, he married Margaret Morris in Washington, D.C.; they had three daughters. Deluhery remained as a legislative assistant to Hughes' successor John Culver for one year, then returned to St. Ambrose. He was a chairperson on the faculty from 1977 to 1978.

On November 7, 1978, he was elected to the Iowa Senate from the 41st district as a Democrat. In his second session, he was elected assistant minority leader, then assistant majority leader in his third session in 1983. Deluhery would be elected to serve in the Senate seven times, serving from 1979 to 2003. Deluhery is now retired and resides in Des Moines, Iowa.

Party political offices
Vacant Title last held by Dan Gray	Democratic nominee for Iowa Auditor of State; 2002	Vacant Title next held by Jon Murphy
