= Mary E. Kramer =

American politician and diplomat (born 1935)

Mary Kramer
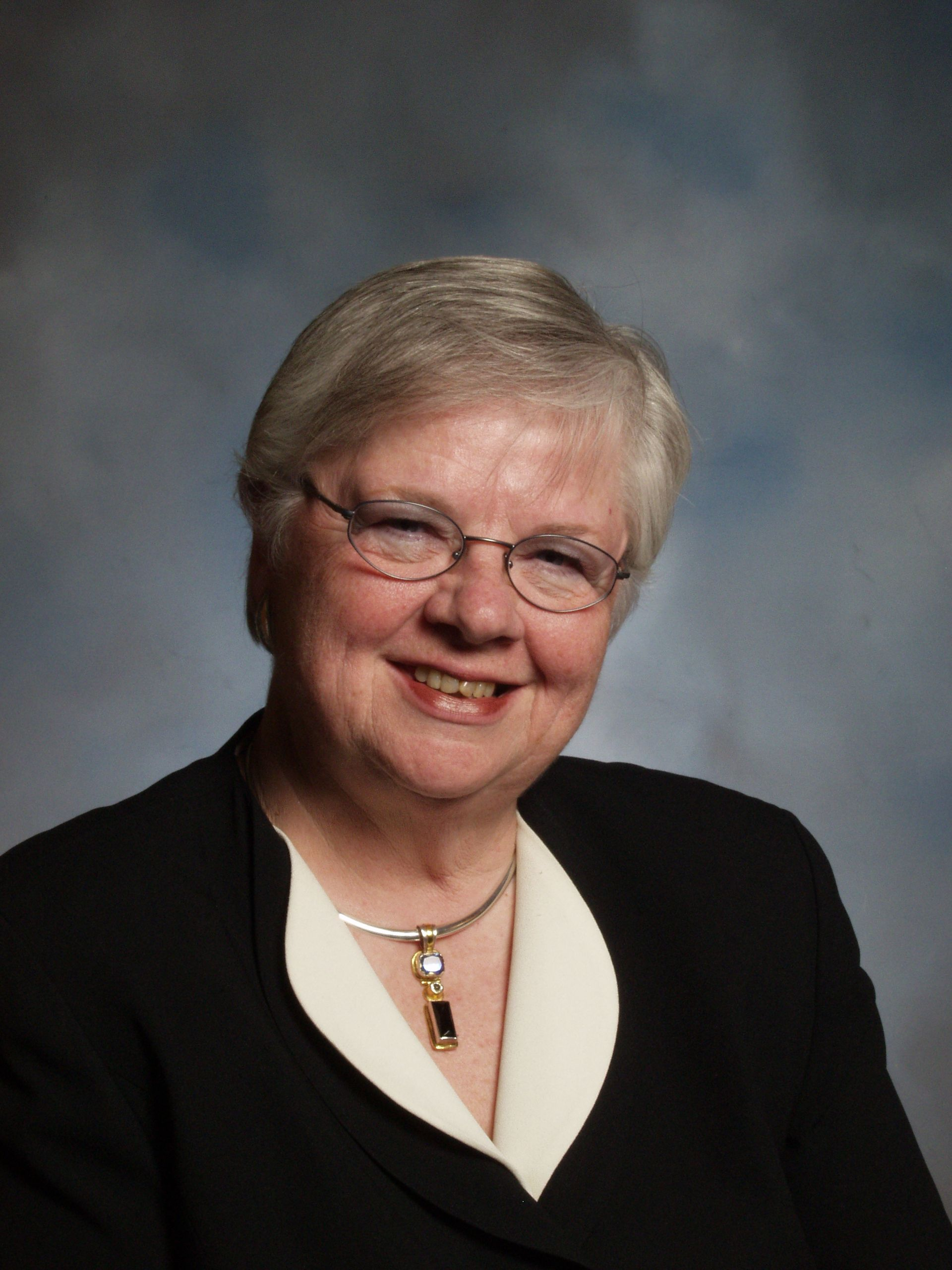

8th United States Ambassador to Barbados
- In office March 30, 2004 – October 30, 2006
- President: George W. Bush
- Preceded by: Earl Norfleet Phillips
- Succeeded by: Mary Martin Ourisman

Member of the Iowa Senate from the 30th district
- In office January 2003 – February 4, 2004
- Preceded by: Neal Schuerer
- Succeeded by: Pat Ward

Member of the Iowa Senate from the 37th district
- In office January 1993 – January 2003
- Preceded by: Ralph Rosenberg
- Succeeded by: Douglas Shull

Member of the Iowa Senate from the 41st district
- In office January 1991 – January 1993
- Preceded by: Julia Gentleman
- Succeeded by: Jack W. Hester

Personal details
- Born: June 14, 1935 (age 91) Burlington, Iowa, U.S.
- Party: Republican
- Spouse: Kay Kramer
- Children: Son; Daughter
- Education: University of Iowa
- Profession: Teacher, Politician, Diplomat

Mary E. Kramer (born June 14, 1935) is an American former politician. A member of the Republican Party, she served as an Iowa State Senator from 1990 to 2003. She was elected President of the Senate in 1997, becoming the first independently elected woman to fill the post. In 2003 Kramer was nominated by President George W. Bush to serve as U.S. Ambassador to Barbados and the Eastern Caribbean; she was confirmed by the United States Senate and served from 2004 to 2006.

== Early life and education ==
Mary Kramer was born in Burlington, Iowa on June 14, 1935, and grew up in Iowa City. She holds a Bachelor of Arts degree from the University of Iowa in piano performance and a Master of Arts degree in education, also from the University of Iowa.

For nearly twenty years Kramer worked as a teacher and school administrator in Iowa. In 1975 she entered the corporate sector when she became the Corporate Personnel Director for Younkers, Inc. She joined Wellmark Blue Cross and Blue Shield in 1981, and during her eighteen years with the company served as Vice President of Human Resources and as Vice President of Community Investments.

== Career ==
Kramer's political career began in 1990 when she was first elected to the Iowa Senate, succeeding Julia Gentleman and representing Clive, Des Moines and West Des Moines. Her special interests were in education, economic development, and health care. She was elected Assistant Minority Leader in 1992 and President in 1997.

In 2002, President George W. Bush appointed Kramer Chairperson of the White House Commission for Presidential Scholars, and in 2003, the President nominated her as the United States Ambassador to the Seven Island Nations of the Eastern Caribbean. Kramer held the latter post from 2004 until her retirement in 2006.

In August 2009, Kramer was inducted into the Iowa Women's Hall of Fame.

== Recognition ==
Kramer has served on the Board of the Directors for the State Legislative Leaders Foundation and was the chairman of the board for the Senate President's Forum. She was a member of the Reforming States Group of the Milbank Fund, a group dedicated to population-wide health improvement. Additionally, she has served as a member of the Board of the Des Moines Club, the Des Moines Area Community College, the Greater Des Moines Chamber of Commerce, United Way of Central Iowa, the Polk County Child Care Resource Center, Brenton Bank, and Mercy Hospital. She is also a lifetime member of the Society for Human Resource Management (SHRM) in Iowa and received the Society's highest national award in June 1996.

== Personal life ==
Kramer and her late husband, Kay Kramer, married in 1958. They have a son and a daughter and four grandchildren. Kay Kramer died in November 2018.

Kramer is currently working on a memoir of her experiences in politics.

Iowa Senate
Preceded by Julia Gentleman	Member of the Iowa Senate from the 41st district 1991–1993	Succeeded by Jack W. Hester
Preceded by Ralph Rosenberg	Member of the Iowa Senate from the 37th district 1993–2003	Succeeded by Douglas Shull
Preceded by Neal Schuerer	Member of the Iowa Senate from the 30th district 2003–2004	Succeeded by Pat Ward
Diplomatic posts
Preceded by Earl Norfleet Phillips	United States Ambassador to Barbados; 2004-2006	Succeeded by Mary Martin Ourisman
Preceded by Earl Norfleet Phillips	United States Ambassador to Dominica; 2004-2006	Succeeded by Mary Martin Ourisman
Preceded by Earl Norfleet Phillips	United States Ambassador to Saint Lucia; 2004-2006	Succeeded by Mary Martin Ourisman
Preceded by Earl Norfleet Phillips	United States Ambassador to Saint Vincent and the Grenadines; 2004-2006	Succeeded by Mary Martin Ourisman
Preceded by Earl Norfleet Phillips	United States Ambassador to Antigua and Barbuda; 2004-2006	Succeeded by Mary Martin Ourisman
Preceded by Earl Norfleet Phillips	United States Ambassador to Grenada; 2004-2006	Succeeded by Mary Martin Ourisman
Preceded by Earl Norfleet Phillips	United States Ambassador to Saint Kitts and Nevis; 2004-2006	Succeeded by Mary Martin Ourisman
