= Randal Giannetto =

American politician (born 1956)

Randal J. Giannetto (born 27 December 1956) is an American lawyer and politician.

Randal Giannetto was born on 27 December 1956 to parents Carl and Barbara Giannetto. He attended Marshalltown High School. After graduating in 1975, Giannetto served in the United States Army from 1977 to 1980. He subsequently enrolled at Marshalltown Community College, completing his studies there in 1983. By 1985, he had earned a degree in political science and history from the University of Iowa. After completing his juris doctor degree at the University of Iowa College of Law in 1988, Giannetto began practicing law in Marshalltown. Between 1993 and 1997, Giannetto was a Democratic member of the Iowa Senate, representing District 32. During his tenure as state senator, Giannetto served as a chair of the senate's judiciary committee. He was opposed to the reinstatement of the death penalty in Iowa. In April 1995, Giannetto proposed an amendment regarding prison labor which was rejected by legislative colleagues. In February 1996, Giannetto drafted a bill that classified taking nude or semi-nude pictures of a minor as a Class D felony, in response to an incident in Ogden.
