= Iowa's 50th Senate district =

American legislative district

Iowa's 50th State Senate district
Senator
Pam Jochum; D

The 50th District of the Iowa Senate is located in southeastern Iowa, and is currently composed of Lee County and part of Des Moines County.

== Current elected officials ==
Jeff Reichman is the senator currently representing the 50th District.

The area of the 50th District contains two Iowa House of Representatives districts:

- The 99th District (represented by Matthew Rinker)
- The 100th District (represented by Blaine Watkins)

The district is also located in Iowa's 1st congressional district, which is represented by Mariannette Miller-Meeks.

== Recent election results from statewide races ==
Year	Office	Results
2008	President	Obama 60–38%
2012	President	Obama 60–40%
2016	President	Trump 51–42%
2016	Senate	Grassley 53–42%
2018	Governor	Hubbell 54–44%
2018	Attorney General	Miller 76–24%
2018	Secretary of State	DeJear 51–47%
2018	Treasurer	Fitzgerald 56–42%
2018	Auditor	Sand 55–43%
2020	President	Trump 54–44%
2020	Senate	Greenfield 48.0–47.8%
2022	Senate	Grassley 56–44%
2022	Governor	Reynolds 58–39%
2022	Attorney General	Bird 53–47%
2022	Secretary of State	Pate 58–42%
2022	Treasurer	Smith 53–47%
2022	Auditor	Halbur 53–47%
2024	President	Trump 58–40%

== Past senators ==
The district has previously been represented by:

- Donald Beneke, 1961–1963
- Wilson Davis, 1971–1973
- Mike Gronstal, 1985–1992
- Eugene Fraise, 1993–2002
- Mike Gronstal, 2003–2012
- Pam Jochum, 2013–2023
