= Jack Holveck =

American politician

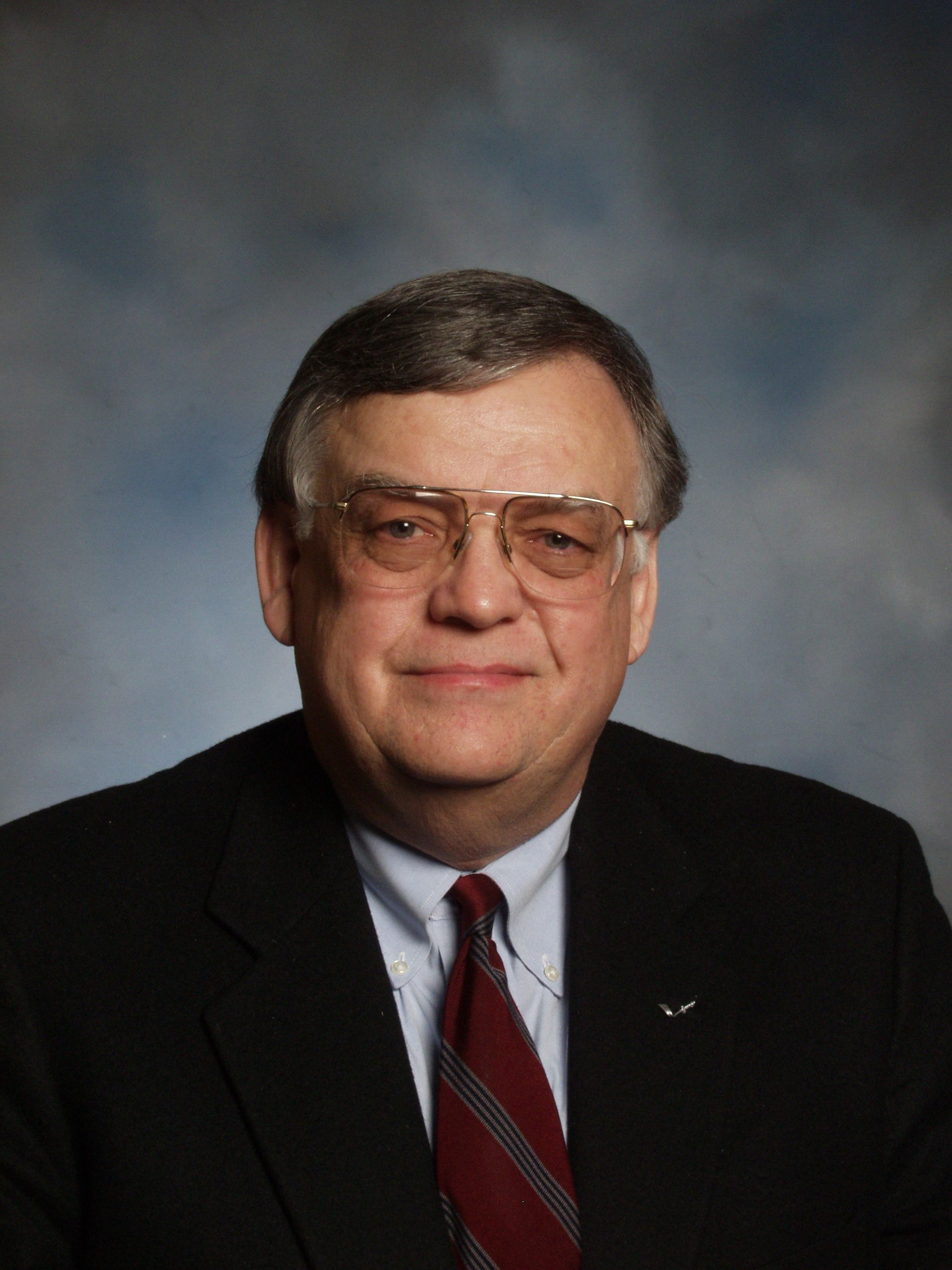
- Official portrait, 2003

Member of the Iowa State Senate
- In office January 8, 2001 – January 9, 2005

Member of the Iowa State House of Representatives
- In office January 10, 1983 – January 7, 2001

Personal details
- Born: May 26, 1943 (age 83) Marshalltown, Iowa, U.S.
- Party: Democrat
- Spouse: Andrea White
- Occupation: lawyer

Jack Holveck (born May 26, 1943) is an American politician in the state of Iowa.

Holveck was born in Marshalltown, Iowa. He attended William Penn College and University of Iowa and is a lawyer. A Democrat, he served in the Iowa House of Representatives from 1983 to 1995 (84th district from 1983 to 1993 and 72nd district from 1993 to 2001) Iowa Senate from 1995 to 2003 (36th district 2001 to 2003 and 32nd district from 2003 to 2005).
