= Michael Gronstal =

American politician

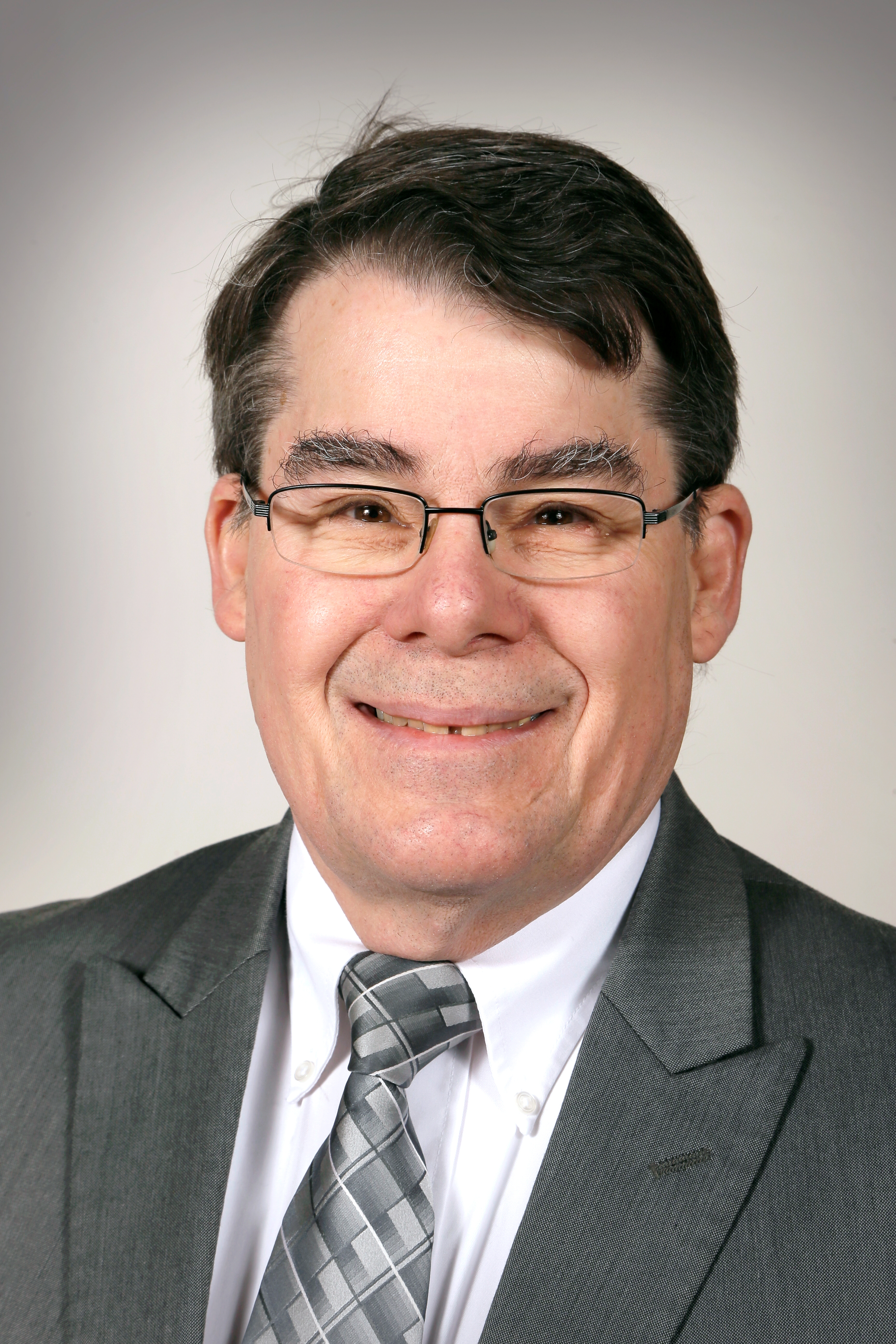

Member of the Iowa Senate from the 8th district 50th (1985–1993; 2003–2013) 42nd (1993–2003)
- In office January 14, 1985 – January 8, 2017
- Preceded by: Tom Slater
- Succeeded by: Dan Dawson

President of the National Conference of State Legislatures
- In office 2016
- Preceded by: Curt Bramble
- Succeeded by: Dan Blue

Member of the Iowa House of Representatives from the 99th district
- In office January 10, 1983 – January 13, 1985
- Preceded by: Emil Pavich
- Succeeded by: Brent Siegrist

Personal details
- Born: January 29, 1950 (age 76) Council Bluffs, Iowa, U.S.
- Party: Democratic
- Spouse: Connie Meisenbach
- Children: Kate; Sarah
- Education: Loyola University, Chicago; Antioch College
- Website: Government website

Michael E. Gronstal (born January 29, 1950) is a former Iowa State Senator who represented the 8th district in the Iowa Senate. He served from 1985 to 2017 and was the majority leader and chairman of the Rules and Administration committee. He was also chairman of the Democratic Legislative Campaign Committee (DLCC), the national organization to elect Democratic state legislators.

== Personal life and education ==
Gronstal was born on January 29, 1950. He received his B.A. from Antioch College. Gronstal and his wife, Connie, have two daughters: Kate, who is a transportation engineer at Stantec in Chicago; and Sara, who is currently Director of Forensics at Eastern Illinois University.

== Political career ==
Gronstal was re-elected in 2004 with 12,480 votes (54%), defeating Republican opponent Loren Knauss. He won re-election again in 2008 with 58% of the votes.

Prior to serving in the Senate, he served one term in the Iowa House of Representatives. He also served as the chair of the Pottawattamie County Democratic Party from 1986 to 1988.

Gronstal supported efforts to increase renewable fuels in Iowa and in 2006, Iowa passed the nation's strongest ethanol legislation. Gronstal also supported legislation to increase funding for community colleges and school districts.

After the Iowa Supreme Court ruled in favor of gay marriage in the Varnum v. Brien decision in April 2009, Gronstal blocked a Republican attempt to overturn the Court's decision with a constitutional amendment. He released a YouTube video in which he quoted his daughter's statement that opponents of same-sex marriage in Iowa had already lost because her generation does not care about the issue.

In 2016, he served as president of the National Conference of State Legislatures.

Gronstal lost his bid for re-election to the Iowa Senate in 2016, and was replaced by Republican Dan Dawson. As of 2022, he is a lobbyist for the Iowa State Building and Construction Trades.

Iowa Senate
Preceded by Tom Slater	Member of the Iowa Senate from the 50th district 1985–1993	Succeeded by Gene Fraise
Preceded by Elaine Szymoniak	Member of the Iowa Senate from the 42nd district 1993–2003	Succeeded by Bryan Sievers
Preceded by Gene Fraise	Member of the Iowa Senate from the 50th district 2003–2013	Succeeded by Pam Jochum
Preceded by Mary Jo Wilhelm	Member of the Iowa Senate from the 8th district 2013–2017	Succeeded by Dan Dawson
