= Iowa's 30th Senate district =

American legislative district

Senate District 30
- Type: District of the Upper House
- Location: Northeast Iowa
- Senator: Doug Campbell (R)
- Parent organization: Iowa General Assembly

The 30th District of the Iowa Senate is located in northern Iowa, and is currently composed of Worth, Cerro Gordo, and Mitchell Counties, as well as part of Floyd County.

== Current elected officials ==
Eric Giddens is the senator currently representing the 30th District.

The area of the 30th District contains two Iowa House of Representatives districts:

- The 59th District (represented by Bob Kressig)
- The 60th District (represented by Dave Williams)

The district is also located in Iowa's 1st congressional district, which is represented by Ashley Hinson.

== Past senators ==
The district has previously been represented by:

- Charles Peter Miller, 1983–1988
- Mark R. Hagerla, 1989–1992
- Emil Husak, 1993–1996
- Neal Schuerer, 1997–2002
- Mary Kramer, 2003
- Pat Ward, 2004–2012
- Jeff Danielson, 2013–2019
- Eric Giddens 2019–2025
- Doug Campbell 2025-Present

== Recent election results from statewide races ==
Year	Office	Results
2008	President	Obama 59–39%
2012	President	Obama 56–44%
2016	President	Trump 53–40%
2016	Senate	Grassley 62–34%
2018	Governor	Reynolds 53–45%
2018	Attorney General	Miller 76–24%
2018	Secretary of State	Pate 54–43%
2018	Treasurer	Fitzgerald 56–42%
2018	Auditor	Mosiman 52–45%
2020	President	Trump 56–42%
2020	Senate	Ernst 51–46%
2022	Senate	Grassley 58–42%
2022	Governor	Reynolds 60–38%
2022	Attorney General	Bird 54–46%
2022	Secretary of State	Pate 61–39%
2022	Treasurer	Smith 52–48%
2022	Auditor	Halbur 56–44%
2024	President	Trump 58–40%

== See also ==
- Iowa General Assembly
- Iowa Senate
