= Mike Connolly (Iowa politician) =

American politician

Michael W. Connolly
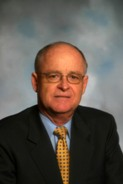

Member of the Iowa Senate from the 14th district
- In office 1990–2008
- Preceded by: Kitty Rehberg
- Succeeded by: Pam Jochum

Member of the Iowa House of Representatives from the 35th district
- In office 1978–1990
- Preceded by: Diane Brandt

Personal details
- Born: October 31, 1945 (age 80) Dubuque, Iowa, U.S.
- Party: Democratic
- Spouse: Martha
- Children: Maureen, John
- Education: Loras College
- Occupation: Legislator
- Website: Connolly's website

Michael W. Connolly (born October 31, 1945) was the Iowa State Senator from the 14th District. He served in the Iowa Senate from 1989 to 2008 and was an assistant majority leader.

== Education ==
He received his B.A. and M.A. from Loras College.

== Career ==
Connolly spent 30 years in the public service, 10 of which were spent in the Iowa House and 20 years in the Iowa Senate. Connolly served on several committees in the Iowa Senate - the Appropriations committee; the Education committee; the Ways and Means committee; the Ethics committee, where he was vice chair; the Government Oversight committee, where he was vice chair; the State Government committee, where he was chair and the Transportation committee, where he was chair. He served in the Iowa House of Representatives from 1979 to 1989.

Connolly ran unopposed for re-election in 2004, receiving 21,685 votes. He was not a candidate for reelection in 2008.

Iowa House of Representatives
Preceded by Tom Tauke	20th District; 1978 – 1982	Succeeded by John Groninga
Preceded by Diane Brandt	35th District; 1982 – 1990	Succeeded by ??
Iowa Senate
Preceded by Robert Carr	18th District; 1990 – 2002	Succeeded by Mary Lundby
Preceded by Kitty Rehberg	14th District; 2002 – 2008	Succeeded by Pam Jochum
