= Kitty Rehberg =

American politician (born 1938)

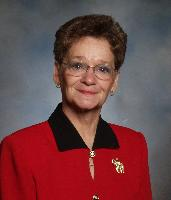

Member of the Iowa State Senate
- In office January 13, 1997 – January 9, 2005

Personal details
- Born: October 16, 1938 (age 87) Cedar Rapids, Iowa, U.S.
- Party: Republican
- Occupation: Farmer

Kathleen "Kitty" Rehberg (née Kaesser; born October 16, 1938) is an American politician in the state of Iowa. A Republican, she served in the Iowa Senate as the representative for the 14th district from 1997 to 2003 and as the representative for the 12th district from 2003 to 2005.

== Early life ==
Rehberg was born on October 16, 1938, in Cedar Rapids, Iowa. Her parents are Nina and Delbert Kaesser. She attended Rowley Consolidated School and Kirkwood Community College. Rehberg was a farmer. She continued to function in that capacity before and after serving as a state senator for the Republican Party in Buchanan County.

== Political career ==
Rehberg was first elected to the Iowa Senate as the representative for the 14th district in the 1996 general election, after successfully beating Democrat Larry Murphy.

Rehberg worked to eliminate parts of the inheritance tax and cut income taxes by 10 percent. She was also widely known for encouraging the development of entrepreneurs within her community. This stunt and other beliefs put her at stark odds with some of her party members. "What we all came on is we thought government was too intrusive into our lives and was taking too much of our money -- our hard-earned money," Rehberg said.
