= Lyle Zieman =

American farmer, businessman, and politician

Lyle Elmer Zieman (March 12, 1921 – January 25, 2003) was an American farmer, businessman, and politician.

Born on a farm, near Luana, Iowa, in Clayton County, Iowa, Zieman graduated from Postville High School in Postville, Iowa. He was a dairy and hog farmer in Allamakee County, Iowa. He was also involved with the banking and telephone businesses. Zieman served on the Allamakee County of Supervisors. He also served on the Postville Community School Board. From 1993 until 2001, Zieman served in the Iowa State Senate and was a Republican. Zieman died in a hospital in Rochester, Minnesota. His son Mark Zieman also served in the Iowa Senate.
