= Gene Fraise =

American politician (1932–2020)

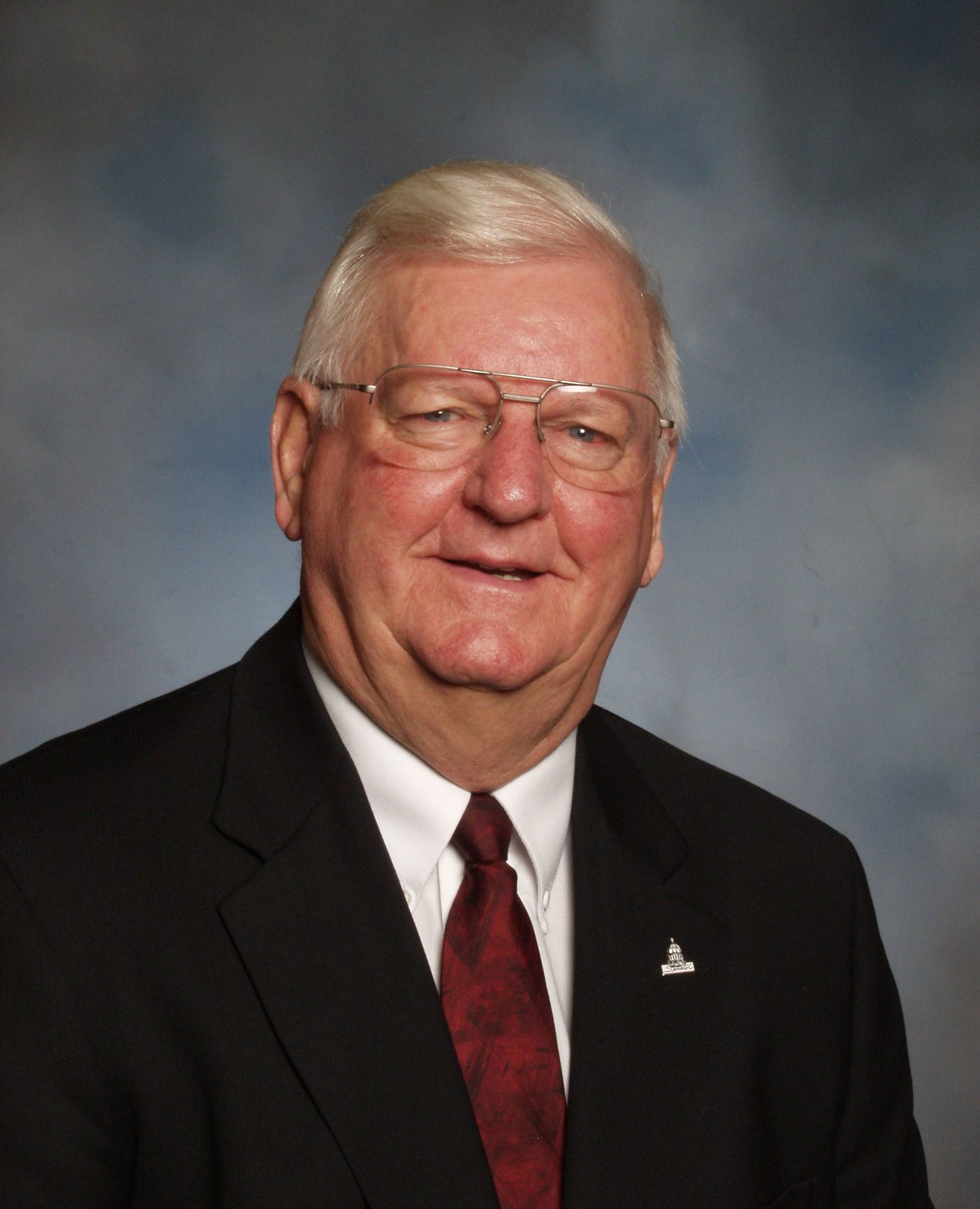

Member of the Iowa Senate
- In office January 7, 1986 – January 13, 2013
- Constituency: 31st district (1986–1993); 50th district (1993–2003); 46th district (2003–2013)

Personal details
- Born: Eugene Stace Fraise; May 7, 1932 West Point, Iowa, U.S.
- Died: November 27, 2020 (aged 88) West Burlington, Iowa, U.S.
- Party: Democratic
- Spouse: Faye Pumphrey
- Occupation: Politician, farmer
- Website: Fraise's website

Eugene Stace Fraise (May 7, 1932 – November 27, 2020) was an American politician from Iowa.

== Career ==
He served in the Iowa Senate from the 46th district from 1986, when he filled a vacancy left by Lowell Junkins' resignation, until 2013.

Fraise served on several committees in the Iowa Senate – the Appropriations committee; the Judiciary committee; and the Agriculture committee, of which he was the committee chairman. He also served as vice chair of the Justice System Appropriations Subcommittee. His prior political experience includes sitting on the Lee County Board of Supervisors for seven years.

Fraise was re-elected in 2004 with 14,272 votes (53%), defeating Republican opponent Doug P. Abolt.

== Death ==
Fraise died from COVID-19 in West Burlington, Iowa, on November 27, 2020, at age 88.

Iowa Senate
Preceded by Lowell Junkins	31st District; 1986 – 1993	Succeeded by Ralph Rosenberg
Preceded by Michael Gronstal	50th District; 1993 – 2003	Succeeded by Michael Gronstal
Preceded by Paul McKinley	46th District; 2003 – 2013	Succeeded by Chris Brase
