= Merlin Bartz =

American politician (born 1961)

Merlin E. Bartz
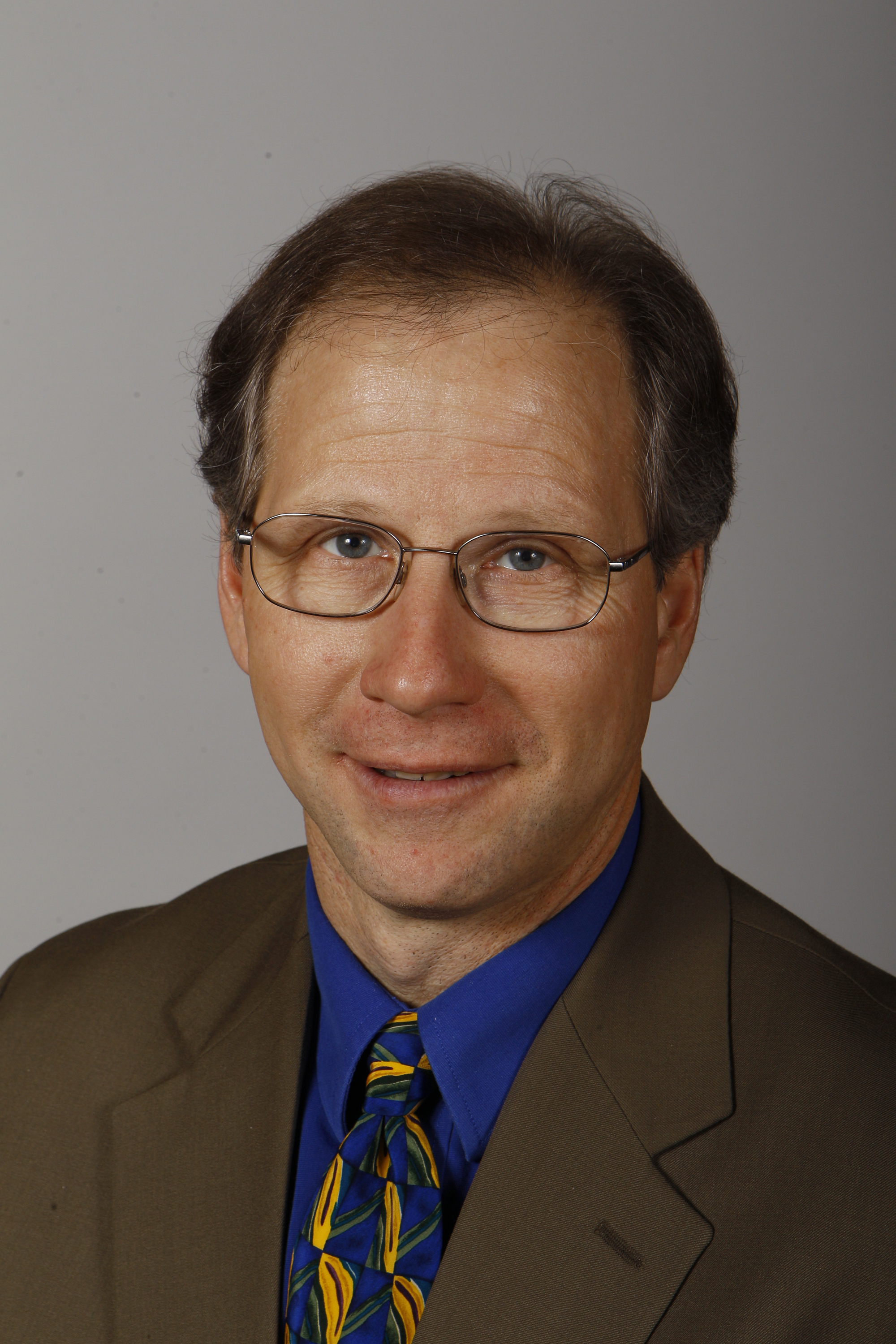

Member of the Iowa Senate from the 6th district
- In office January 12, 2009 – January 13, 2013
- Preceded by: E. Thurman Gaskill
- Succeeded by: Mark Segebart

Member of the Iowa Senate from the 10th district
- In office January 11, 1993 – February 11, 2002
- Preceded by: Alvin Miller
- Succeeded by: Amanda Ragan

Member of the Iowa House of Representatives from the 19th district
- In office January 14, 1991 – January 11, 1993
- Preceded by: Dennis May
- Succeeded by: Gary Blodgett

Personal details
- Born: March 16, 1961 (age 65) Mason City, Iowa, U.S.
- Party: Republican
- Spouse: Lisa Jorgensen
- Education: Luther College
- Occupation: Farmer
- Website: Bartz's website

Merlin E. Bartz (born March 16, 1961) is an American politician who served as an Iowa State Senator from the 6th District, elected in 2008 and serving for a single term. A Republican, he sat on the Appropriations, Human Resources, Natural Resources, and Ways and Means committees. He was the ranking member on the Administration and Regulation Appropriations Subcommittee.

Bartz lost his reelection bid in 2012 in a race where there were two incumbents redistricted together. Incumbent Mary Jo Wilhlem defeated Senator Bartz by 126 votes in a very contentious election, where at one point Bartz was accused of joining the War on Women and of being demeaning to women.

Previously he served in the Iowa House of Representatives (19th District, 1991 – 1993), and the Iowa Senate (10th District, 1993 – 2002). He was Senate Assistant Majority Leader in the 77th, 78th, and 79th General Assemblies. Bartz was appointed (January, 2002) Special Assistant to the Undersecretary, Natural Resources and Environment, U.S. Department of Agriculture in Washington, D.C. He is a sixth generation Iowa farmer. From July 2004, he was Regional Assistant Chief, Central, for the Natural Resources Conservation Service (NRCS). He was a management representative of the Chief, providing direction of NRCS programs and activities and overall leadership and supervision to state conservationists in Arkansas, Illinois, Iowa, Kansas, Louisiana, Minnesota, Missouri, Nebraska, North Dakota, Oklahoma, South Dakota, Texas, and Wisconsin. Bartz has a B.A. music and political science from Luther College.

== Issues ==
Bartz has focused on reining in expenditures. Bartz launched a drive to gather petitions asking County Recorders to deny marriage licenses for same-sex marriages after Democrats thwarted efforts to launch a constitutional amendment in the Iowa General Assembly following the Iowa Supreme Court's 2009 ruling in Varnum v. Brien authorizing same-sex marriage in Iowa.

== Electoral history ==
Iowa Senate elections, 2012
Party	Candidate	Votes	%
Democratic	Mary Jo Wilhelm	15,530	50.17
Republican	Merlin Bartz	15,404	49.17
Independent	Write in	18	.66

Iowa Senate elections, 2008
Party	Candidate	Votes	%
Republican	Merlin Bartz	14,268	49.26
Democratic	Doug Thompson	12,447	42.97
Independent	Kenneth J Abrams	2,232	7.71

Iowa House of Representatives
Preceded by Dennis May	19th District; January 14, 1991 – January 11, 1993	Succeeded by Gary Blodgett
Iowa Senate
Preceded by Alvin Miller	10th District; January 11, 1993 – February 11, 2002	Succeeded by Amanda Ragan
Preceded by E. Thurman Gaskill	6th District; January 12, 2009 – January 13, 2013	Succeeded by Mark Segebart
