= Donald Redfern =

American politician

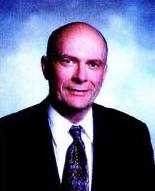

Member of the Iowa State Senate
- In office January 11, 1993 – January 9, 2005

Personal details
- Born: June 9, 1945 (age 81) Nebraska City, Nebraska, U.S.
- Party: Republican
- Occupation: lawyer

Donald B. Redfern (born June 9, 1945) is an American politician in the state of Iowa.

Redfern was born in Nebraska City, Nebraska. He attended Carleton College and Columbia University Law School and is a lawyer. He served Iowa Senate from 1991 to 2004, as a Republican (12th district from 1993 to 2003 and 10th district from 2003 to 2005).

Redfern's unsuccessful 1988 Congressional run is discussed in Chinese political theorist Wang Huning's book America Against America as an example of the dynamics of U.S. political campaigns.
