= H. Kay Hedge =

American politician

Member of the Iowa State Senate
- In office 1989–2001

Personal details
- Born: Harry Kay Hedge, Jr. April 2, 1928 Rose Hill, Iowa, U.S.
- Died: October 28, 2016 (aged 88) Ottumwa, Iowa, U.S.
- Party: Republican
- Occupation: farmer

Harry Kay Hedge, Jr. (April 2, 1928 – October 28, 2016) was an American politician in the state of Iowa.

Hedge was born in Rose Hill, Iowa. He attended University of Iowa and was a farmer. He served in the Iowa State Senate from 1989 to 2001, as a Republican. He served in the United States Army during the Korean War. Hedge served on the Fremont School Board and the Mahaska County School Board. Hedge died on October 28, 2016, in Ottumwa, Iowa.
