= Neal Schuerer =

American politician (born 1954)

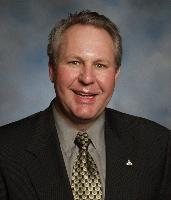

Member of the Iowa State Senate
- In office January 13, 1997 – January 9, 2005

Personal details
- Born: November 16, 1956 (age 69) Amana, Iowa, United States
- Party: Republican
- Spouse: Melissa
- Children: 2
- Occupation: businessman

Neal Schuerer (born November 16, 1954) is an American politician in the state of Iowa.

Schuerer was born in Amana, Iowa. He attended Central College and is a restaurateur. A Republican, he served in the Iowa State Senate from 1997 to 2005 (30th district from 1997 to 2003 and 38th district from 2003 to 2005).
