= Gene Maddox =

American politician and lawyer

O. Gene Maddox
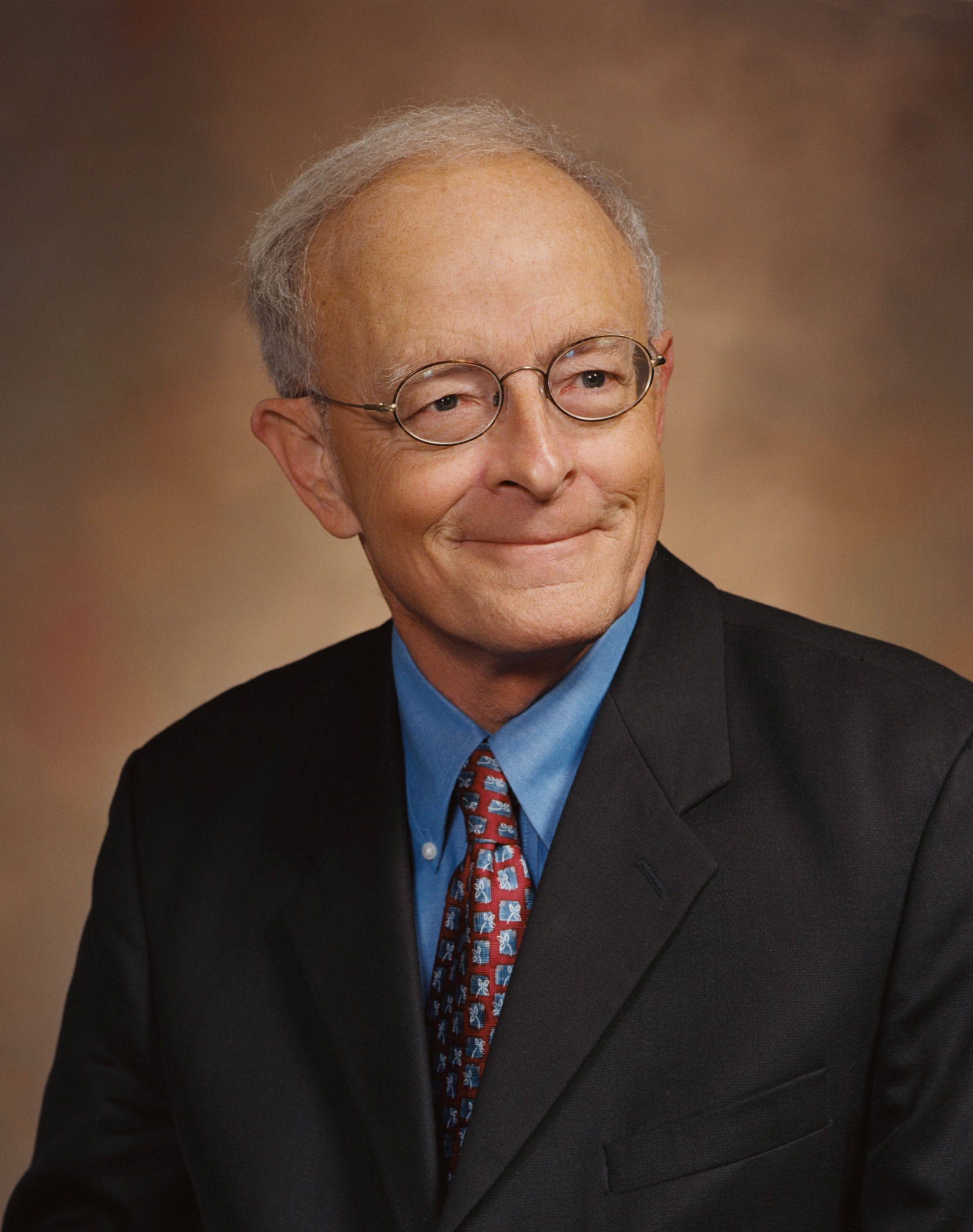

Member of the Iowa House of Representatives
- In office January 13, 2003 – January 7, 2007

Member of the Iowa Senate
- In office January 11, 1993 – January 12, 2003

Personal details
- Born: Orville Gene Maddox; August 23, 1938 Chillicothe, Illinois, United States
- Died: June 2, 2015 (aged 76) Des Moines, Iowa, United States
- Party: Republican
- Education: Northwestern University
- Occupation: Attorney

Orville Gene Maddox (August 23, 1938 – June 2, 2015) was an American politician and lawyer.

Born in Chillicothe, Illinois, Maddox graduated from Chillicothe High School in 1956. He then received his bachelor's degree from Northwestern University in 1960 and his law degree from Northwestern University School of Law in 1962. Maddox then moved to Des Moines, Iowa to practice law. In 1975, Maddox served on the Clive, Iowa City Council and then served as mayor of Clive, Iowa, from 1977 until 1992. Maddox was a Republican. From 1993 to 2003, Maddox served in the Iowa Senate and then served in the Iowa House of Representatives from 2003 to 2007. Maddox died in Des Moines, Iowa.
