= Elaine Szymoniak =

American politician

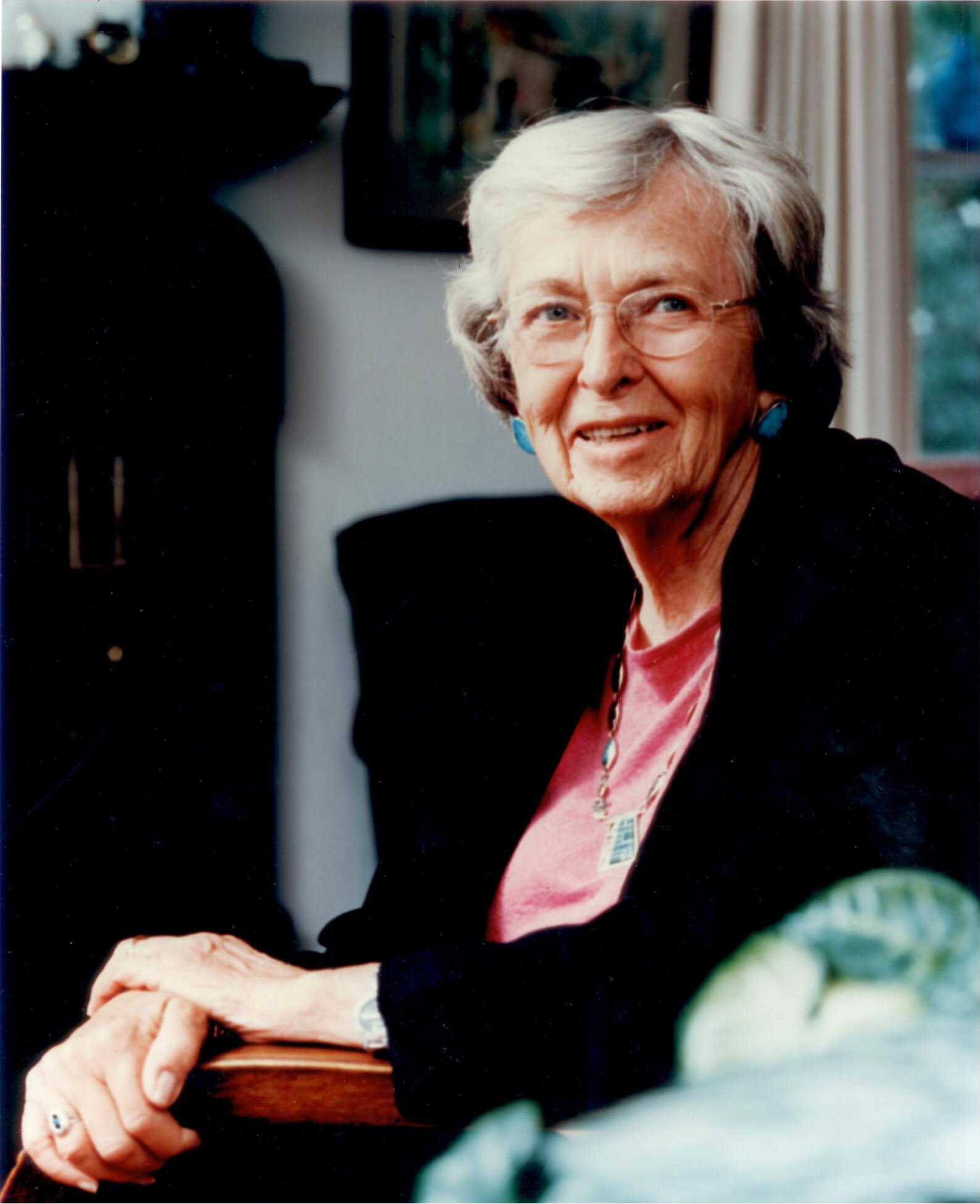

Member of the Iowa Senate from the 36th district 42nd (1988–1992)
- In office 1988–2000

Personal details
- Born: May 24, 1920 Boscobel, Wisconsin, US
- Died: May 20, 2009 (aged 88) Des Moines, Iowa, US
- Party: Democratic
- Spouse: Casimir D. Szymoniak (deceased)
- Children: 5
- Education: University of Wisconsin; Iowa State University

Elaine Eisfelder Szymoniak (May 24, 1920 – May 20, 2009) was a State Senator from the U.S. state of Iowa, a former City Council Member representing the city of Des Moines, Iowa and a retired hearing and speech specialist, counselor, and administrator for the Iowa Department of Vocational Rehabilitation.

Szymoniak, an elected Democrat, served in the Iowa State Senate from 1988 to 2000 (when she chose to retire and did not seek re-election) representing the northwest area of Greater Des Moines, Iowa (serving both 42nd and 36th Districts during her tenure). Her main areas of concern while serving in public office were in health, education, and human resources. She earned degrees from both the University of Wisconsin and Iowa State University.

== Biography ==
=== Early life and education ===
Szymoniak was born on May 24, 1920, to Hugo and Pauline Eisfelder in Boscobel, Wisconsin. Both her mother and father were deaf and this led to her interest in the science of audiology and later to pursue a career in speech therapy and in speech and hearing rehabilitation. She had two older brothers. One of these brothers was challenged with cerebral palsy and the other brother died during military service in World War II.

In 1941, Szymoniak earned a bachelor's degree in education and speech pathology from the University of Wisconsin. She married Casimir (Chuck) D. Szymoniak on December 7, 1943. Together they were to raise five children. One of their children, Tom Szymoniak, is an esteemed engineer working for the Washington State Department of Natural Resources.

=== Career ===
She worked in public school systems in the states of Wisconsin, New York and Kansas before moving to Iowa in the 1950s after her husband's military service came to an end. She also put her skills to use in the medical field, at one point working at Army Hospital Aural Rehabilitation Center in Oklahoma.

Elaine was a speech and hearing specialist, counselor, and administrator for the Iowa Department of Vocational Rehabilitation from 1957 to 1988 and she was dedicated to working for the benefit of those with disabilities. She actively worked with the deaf community and at one time was the state's sole rehab counselor for the deaf. In 1977, Elaine earned her master's degree in family environment from Iowa State University in Ames, Iowa.

Elaine participated in canoeing and whitewater rafting in the West with a group named the River Spirits. Her activities included sleeping outside, walking in the woods, and piloting a whitewater raft at the age of 77.

=== Political life ===
She served on the Des Moines City Council from 1977 to 1988 representing the First Ward. Szymoniak won a seat on her first attempt by defeating a twelve-year incumbent. She was the second woman to ever serve on the City Council and the only woman serving during her time on the council. As a member of the Des Moines City Council she worked to meet the needs of her constituents with a special emphasis in economic development, equality, and justice.

She unsuccessfully campaigned to become the mayor of Des Moines in 1979 and again in 1987. Following eleven consecutive years on the Des Moines City Council, Szymoniak set her goals on a different political office and started campaigning for the State Senate.

In the Iowa State Senate from 1988 to 2000, Szymoniak has represented both the forty-second and thirty-sixth districts. Szymoniak’s main areas of concern while serving in public office were in health, education and human resources. This is reflected in the committees she served on in the Senate: Appropriations Committee on Human Services (vice-chair), Education, Human Resources (chair), Judiciary, Local Government and the Ways and Means Committee Many of the bills that she authored and sponsored concerned education, family welfare, or care of the elderly and disabled.

Szymoniak played a key role in revamping Iowa's Welfare System in the early 1990s. Reported on the Iowa State University website is the following information:

"One of her more significant events as a State Senator was to shepherd through the Senate Iowa's Welfare Reform efforts of 1993. In her typical fashion, she read about an idea and decided Iowa was the place to attempt such a reform. She organized a process to design a program based upon the needs and expectations of Iowans. She played an active role in keeping all parties at the table and in finally passing the Iowa Human Investment Act with no dissenting votes in the Senate."

Elaine was known for her significant public service including crafting the legislation that funded and brought the World Food Prize to Iowa. She served on many nonprofit boards of directors or was a member of The Chrysalis Foundation, Iowa Council for International Understanding, United Way, Girl Scouts, the Nexus Executive Women's Alliance, and the Task Force for Iowa's Responsible Fathers program. She received numerous honors including the YWCA Woman of Achievement and she was inducted into the Iowa Women's Hall of Fame in 1999.

While acknowledging anguish on the issue, Szymoniak, a devout Roman Catholic, believed that abortion was a matter that should be left up to the conscience of the individual woman. A parental notification bill on abortion passed in the Iowa House of Representatives in 1994 and Szymoniak kept the bill in committee once it reached the Senate. A few lauded her for political savvy, but most criticized the move as an attempt of three committee members to forestall legislation by denying the Senate an opportunity to vote for or against the bill.

At the end of her legislative term in 2000, Szymoniak did not seek re-election.

== Additional information ==
A 1992 Des Moines Register editorial endorsing her re-election summed up Szymoniak's political service: "Szymoniak has been an extremely hardworking, dedicated and conscientious lawmaker who is regarded at the Statehouse as one of the more effective legislators."

"She is a woman who has done it all — she has been a wonderful, successful mother; has had a career; has been a dedicated volunteer and public servant; and has been a mentor and a role model. She is a woman who has truly made a difference."—Connie Wimer, 1991

Recreational interests: Travel, Camping, Canoeing, Whitewater rafting, Reading.

Former/Recent Organizations and Affiliations: The Chrysalis Foundation, Iowa Council of International Understanding, The United Way Foundation, Girl Scouts of the USA, Nexus Executive Women's Alliance, and the Task Force for Iowa's Responsible Fathers Program, Holy Trinity Catholic Church (Des Moines), YWCA Board, House of Mercy, Coalition for the Homeless, Planned Parenthood, National Organization of Women
