= 2020 Iowa Senate election =

- November 3, 2020

25 out of 50 seats in the Iowa State Senate 26 seats needed for a majority
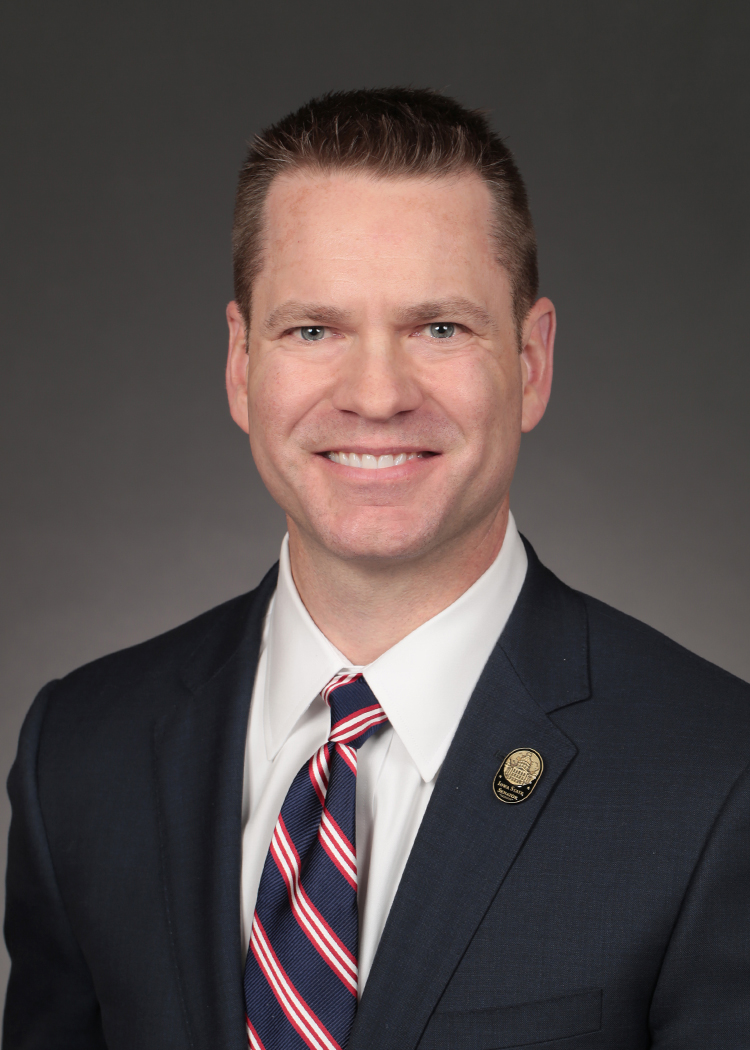

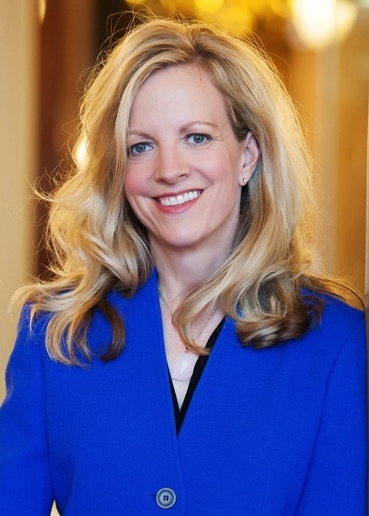
	Majority party	Minority party
Leader	Charles Schneider	Janet Petersen
Party	Republican	Democratic
Leader's seat	22nd district (retiring)	18th district
Last election	32	18
Seats after	32	18
Seat change	Steady	Steady
Popular vote	442,907	304,302
Percentage	58.87%	40.45%
- Results of the elections: Republican gain Democratic gain Republican hold Democratic hold No election
President of the Senate before election
Charles Schneider
Republican
Elected President of the Senate
Jake Chapman
Republican

The 2020 Iowa State Senate elections took place as part of the biennial 2020 United States state legislative elections. Iowa voters elected state senators in half of the state senate's districts – the 25 even-numbered state senate districts. State senators serve four-year terms in the Iowa Senate, with half of the seats up for election each cycle.

A statewide map of the 50 state Senate districts in the 2020 elections is provided by the Iowa General Assembly here.

The primary election on June 2, 2020, determined which candidates appeared on the November 3 general election ballot. The filing deadline was March 13.

Following the previous election in 2018, Republicans retained control of the Iowa Senate with 32 seats to Democrats' 18 seats. To reclaim control of the chamber from Republicans, the Democrats needed to net eight Senate seats.

Republicans retained control of the Iowa Senate following the 2020 general election, with the balance of power remaining unchanged.

== Predictions ==
Source	Ranking	As of
The Cook Political Report	Likely R	October 21, 2020

== Results ==
- NOTE: The 25 odd-numbered districts did not hold elections in 2020 so they are not listed here.

State Senate District	Incumbent	Party	Elected Senator	Party
2nd	Randy Feenstra	Rep	Jeff Taylor	Rep
4th	Dennis Guth	Rep	Dennis Guth	Rep
6th	Mark Segebart	Rep	Craig Steven Williams	Rep
8th	Dan Dawson	Rep	Dan Dawson	Rep
10th	Jake Chapman	Rep	Jake Chapman	Rep
12th	Mark Costello	Rep	Mark Costello	Rep
14th	Amy Sinclair	Rep	Amy Sinclair	Rep
16th	Nate Boulton	Dem	Nate Boulton	Dem
18th	Janet Petersen	Dem	Janet Petersen	Dem
20th	Brad Zaun	Rep	Brad Zaun	Rep
22nd	Charles Schneider	Rep	Sarah Trone Garriott	Dem
24th	Jerry Behn	Rep	Jesse Green	Rep
26th	Waylon Brown	Rep	Waylon Brown	Rep
28th	Michael Breitbach	Rep	Mike Klimesh	Rep
30th	Eric Giddens	Dem	Eric Giddens	Dem
32nd	Craig Johnson	Rep	Craig Johnson	Rep
34th	Liz Mathis	Dem	Liz Mathis	Dem
36th	Jeff Edler	Rep	Jeff Edler	Rep
38th	Tim Kapucian	Rep	Dawn Driscoll	Rep
40th	Ken Rozenboom	Rep	Ken Rozenboom	Rep
42nd	Rich Taylor	Dem	Jeff Reichman	Rep
44th	Thomas Greene	Rep	Tim Goodwin	Rep
46th	Mark Lofgren	Rep	Mark Lofgren	Rep
48th	Dan Zumbach	Rep	Dan Zumbach	Rep
50th	Pam Jochum	Dem	Pam Jochum	Dem

=== Closest races ===
Seats where the margin of victory was under 10%:

1. State Senate district 22, 0.36% gain
2. State Senate district 20, 2.28%
3. State Senate district 30, 3.02%
4. State Senate district 8, 4.42%

== Detailed results ==
- Reminder: Only even-numbered Iowa Senate seats were up for election in 2020; therefore, odd-numbered seats were not having elections in 2020 & are not shown.
- Note: If a district does not list a primary, then that district did not having a competitive primary (i.e., there may have only been one candidate file for that district).

=== District 2 ===
Iowa Senate, District 2 General Election, 2020
Party	Candidate	Votes	%
Republican	Jeff Taylor	26,395	100.0
Total votes		26,395	100.0
Republican hold			

=== District 4 ===
Iowa Senate, District 4 General Election, 2020
Party	Candidate	Votes	%
Republican	Dennis Guth (incumbent)	25,450	100.0
Total votes		25,450	100.0
Republican hold			

=== District 6 ===
Iowa Senate, District 6 Republican Primary Election, 2020
Party	Candidate	Votes	%
Republican	Craig Williams	3,132	60.9
Republican	Heath Hansen	2,007	39.1
Total votes		5,139	100.0

Iowa Senate, District 6 General Election, 2020
Party	Candidate	Votes	%
Republican	Craig Steven Williams	18,919	69.2
Democratic	C.J. Petersen	8,418	30.8
Total votes		27,337	100.0
Republican hold			

=== District 8 ===
Iowa Senate, District 8 General Election, 2020
Party	Candidate	Votes	%
Republican	Dan Dawson (incumbent)	12,391	52.2
Democratic	Steve Gorman	11,344	47.8
Total votes		23,735	100.0
Republican hold			

=== District 10 ===
Iowa Senate, District 10 General Election, 2020
Party	Candidate	Votes	%
Republican	Jake Chapman (incumbent)	24,538	62.5
Democratic	Warren Andrew Varley	14,704	37.5
Total votes		39,242	100.0
Republican hold			

=== District 12 ===
Iowa Senate, District 12 Republican Primary Election, 2020
Party	Candidate	Votes	%
Republican	Mark Costello (incumbent)	5,749	59.4
Republican	Richard Crouch	3,923	40.6
Total votes		9,672	100.0

Iowa Senate, District 12 General Election, 2020
Party	Candidate	Votes	%
Republican	Mark Costello (incumbent)	20,165	69.1
Democratic	Joseph "Joey" Norris	8,999	30.9
Total votes		29,164	100.0
Republican hold			

=== District 14 ===
Iowa Senate, District 14 General Election, 2020
Party	Candidate	Votes	%
Republican	Amy Sinclair (incumbent)	24,623	100.0
Total votes		24,623	100.0
Republican hold			

=== District 16 ===
Iowa Senate, District 16 General Election, 2020
Party	Candidate	Votes	%
Democratic	Nate Boulton (incumbent)	16,868	76.8
Libertarian	ToyA S. Johnson	5,097	23.2
Total votes		21,965	100.0
Democratic hold			

=== District 18 ===
Iowa Senate, District 18 General Election, 2020
Party	Candidate	Votes	%
Democratic	Janet Petersen (incumbent)	20,696	100.0
Total votes		20,696	100.0
Democratic hold			

=== District 20 ===
Iowa Senate, District 20 General Election, 2020
Party	Candidate	Votes	%
Republican	Brad Zaun (incumbent)	21,943	51.1
Democratic	Rhonda Martin	20,968	48.9
Total votes		42,911	100.0
Republican hold			

=== District 22 ===
Iowa Senate, District 22 Republican Primary Election, 2020
Party	Candidate	Votes	%
Republican	Scott Cirksena	3,683	79.3
Republican	Porsha Hart	964	20.7
Total votes		4,647	100.0

Iowa Senate, District 22 Democratic Primary Election, 2020
Party	Candidate	Votes	%
Democratic	Sarah Trone Garriott	4,300	47.9
Democratic	Tricia Gavin	3,480	38.7
Democratic	Michael Libbie	1,206	13.4
Total votes		8,986	100.0

Iowa Senate, District 22 General Election, 2020
Party	Candidate	Votes	%
Democratic	Sarah Trone Garriott	23,110	50.2
Republican	Scott Cirksena	22,946	49.8
Total votes		46,056	100.0
Democratic gain from Republican			

=== District 24 ===
Iowa Senate, District 24 Republican Primary Election, 2020
Party	Candidate	Votes	%
Republican	Jesse Green	2,350	40.8
Republican	Chad Behn	1,837	31.9
Republican	Todd Rasmussen	1,127	19.6
Republican	Joshua D. Dyer	442	7.7
Total votes		5,756	100.0

Iowa Senate, District 24 Democratic Primary Election, 2020
Party	Candidate	Votes	%
Democratic	Cynthia Oppedal Paschen	3,172	67.2
Democratic	Keith D. Puntenney	1,548	32.8
Total votes		4,720	100.0

Iowa Senate, District 24 General Election, 2020
Party	Candidate	Votes	%
Republican	Jesse Green	21,732	65.7
Democratic	Cynthia Oppedal Paschen	11,327	34.3
Total votes		33,059	100.0
Republican hold			

=== District 26 ===
Iowa Senate, District 26 General Election, 2020
Party	Candidate	Votes	%
Republican	Waylon Brown (incumbent)	20,655	65.5
Democratic	Deb Scharper	10,858	34.5
Total votes		31,513	100.0
Republican hold			

=== District 28 ===
Iowa Senate, District 28 General Election, 2020
Party	Candidate	Votes	%
Republican	Mike Klimesh	19,630	62.5
Democratic	Matt Tapscott	11,785	37.5
Total votes		31,415	100.0
Republican hold			

=== District 30 ===
Iowa Senate, District 30 General Election, 2020
Party	Candidate	Votes	%
Democratic	Eric Giddens (incumbent)	17,543	51.5
Republican	Harold Youngblut	16,516	48.5
Total votes		34,059	100.0
Democratic hold			

=== District 32 ===
Iowa Senate, District 32 General Election, 2020
Party	Candidate	Votes	%
Republican	Craig Johnson (incumbent)	19,990	61.2
Democratic	Pam Egli	12,700	38.8
Total votes		32,690	100.0
Republican hold			

=== District 34 ===
Iowa Senate, District 34 General Election, 2020
Party	Candidate	Votes	%
Democratic	Liz Mathis (incumbent)	29,342	100.0
Total votes		29,342	100.0
Democratic hold			

=== District 36 ===
Iowa Senate, District 36 General Election, 2020
Party	Candidate	Votes	%
Republican	Jeff Edler (incumbent)	16,841	60.6
Democratic	David Degner	10,957	39.4
Total votes		27,798	100.0
Republican hold			

=== District 38 ===
Iowa Senate, District 38 Republican Primary Election, 2020
Party	Candidate	Votes	%
Republican	Dawn Driscoll	2,402	45.0
Republican	Garrett Dozark	1,912	35.8
Republican	Bruce Adams	1,025	19.2
Total votes		5,339	100.0

Iowa Senate, District 38 Democratic Primary Election, 2020
Party	Candidate	Votes	%
Democratic	Ivy Schuster	3,642	81.7
Democratic	Alvin Aragon	815	18.3
Total votes		4,457	100.0

Iowa Senate, District 38 General Election, 2020
Party	Candidate	Votes	%
Republican	Dawn Driscoll	21,238	64.0
Democratic	Ivy Schuster	11,948	36.0
Total votes		33,186	100.0
Republican hold			

=== District 40 ===
Iowa Senate, District 40 General Election, 2020
Party	Candidate	Votes	%
Republican	Ken Rozenboom (incumbent)	22,022	71.5
Democratic	Lance Roorda	8,760	28.5
Total votes		30,782	100.0
Republican hold			

=== District 42 ===
Iowa Senate, District 42 Republican Primary Election, 2020
Party	Candidate	Votes	%
Republican	Jeff Reichman	3,338	73.8
Republican	Nancy Amos	1,187	26.2
Total votes		4,525	100.0

Iowa Senate, District 42 General Election, 2020
Party	Candidate	Votes	%
Republican	Jeff Reichman	16,766	59.9
Democratic	Rich Taylor (incumbent)	11,228	40.1
Total votes		27,994	100.0
Republican gain from Democratic			

=== District 44 ===
Iowa Senate, District 44 Republican Primary Election, 2020
Party	Candidate	Votes	%
Republican	Tim Goodwin	3,217	71.6
Republican	Matthew Rinker	1,277	28.4
Total votes		4,494	100.0

Iowa Senate, District 44 Democratic Primary Election, 2020
Party	Candidate	Votes	%
Democratic	Tom Courtney	3,623	72.4
Democratic	Kevin K. Warth	790	15.8
Democratic	Rex Troute	592	11.8
Total votes		5,005	100.0

Iowa Senate, District 44 General Election, 2020
Party	Candidate	Votes	%
Republican	Tim Goodwin	16,447	56.8
Democratic	Tom Courtney	12,493	43.2
Total votes		28,940	100.0
Republican hold			

=== District 46 ===
Iowa Senate, District 46 General Election, 2020
Party	Candidate	Votes	%
Republican	Mark S. Lofgren (incumbent)	18,479	59.4
Democratic	Chris Brase	12,653	40.6
Total votes		31,132	100.0
Republican hold			

=== District 48 ===
Iowa Senate, District 48 General Election, 2020
Party	Candidate	Votes	%
Republican	Dan Zumbach (incumbent)	22,544	65.2
Democratic	Eric Green	12,050	34.8
Total votes		34,594	100.0
Republican hold			

=== District 50 ===
Iowa Senate, District 50 General Election, 2020
Party	Candidate	Votes	%
Democratic	Pam Jochum (incumbent)	18,044	58.7
Republican	Jennifer Smith	12,677	41.3
Total votes		30,721	100.0
Democratic hold			

== See also ==
- 2020 Iowa elections
  - 2020 United States House of Representatives elections in Iowa
- Elections in Iowa
- 2020 United States elections
