= 2012 Iowa Senate election =

Iowa State Senate elections, 2012
- November 6, 2012

26 out of 50 seats in the Iowa State Senate 26 seats needed for a majority
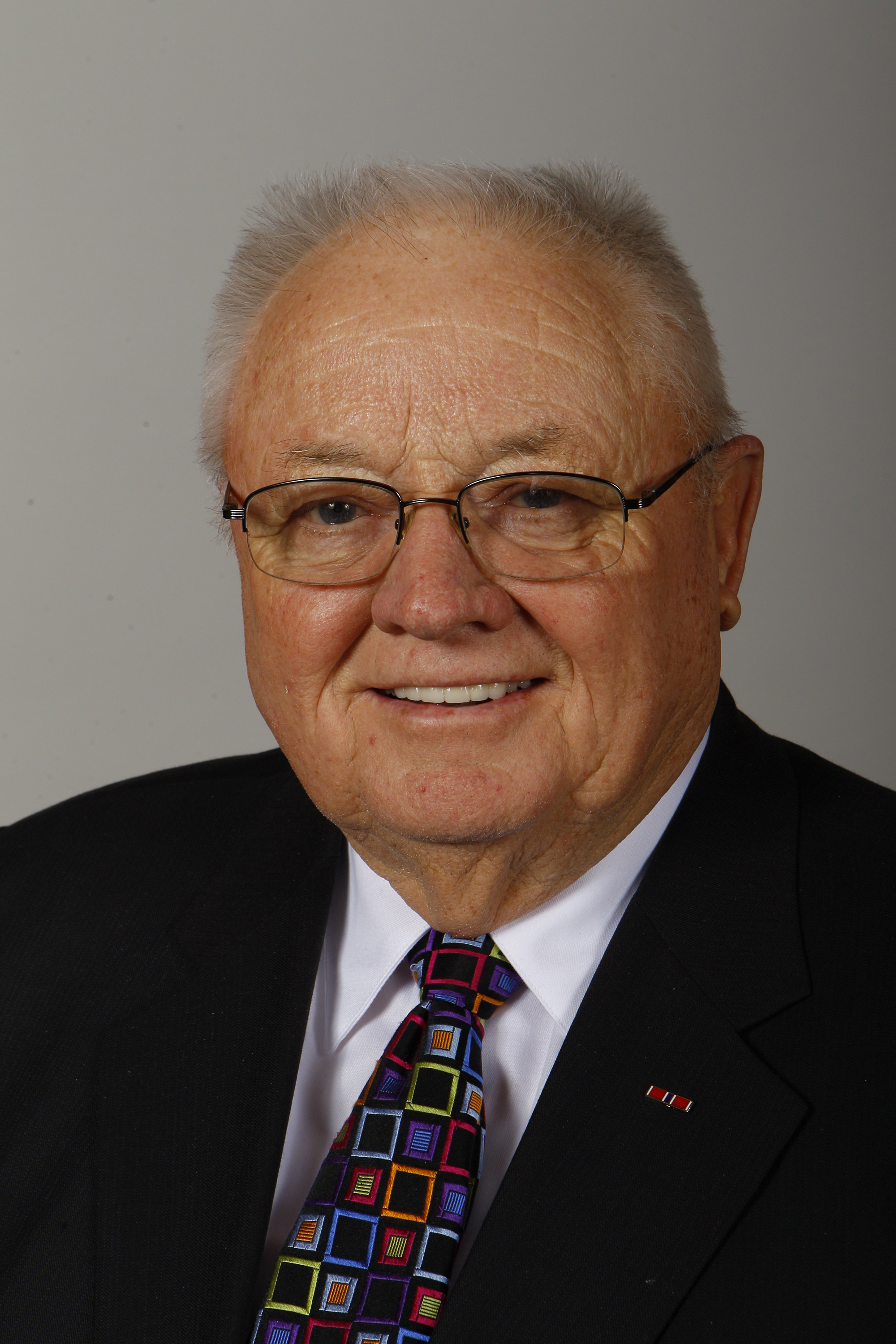

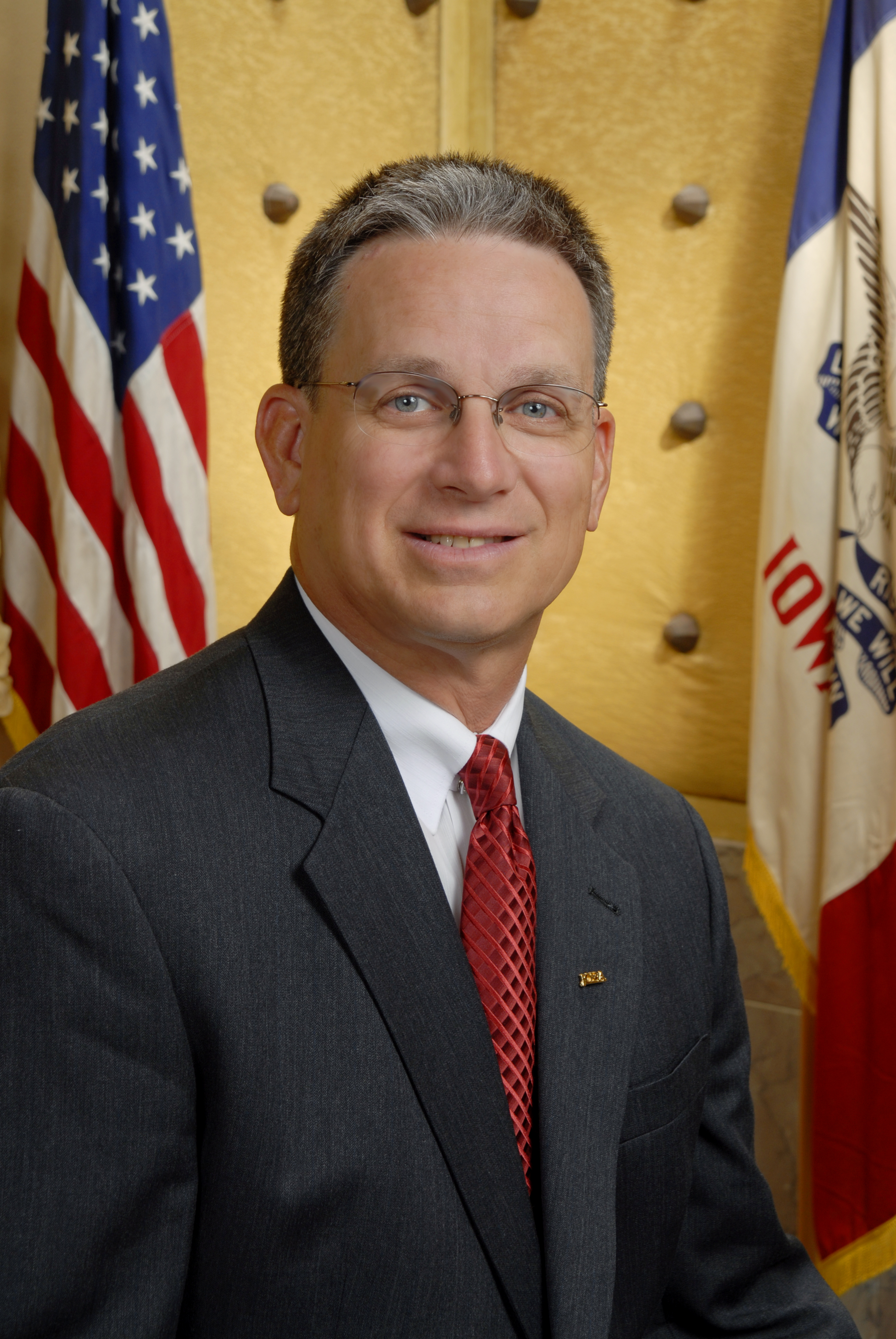
	Majority party	Minority party
Leader	Jack Kibbie	Jerry Behn
Party	Democratic	Republican
Leader's seat	4th district (retired)	24th district
Last election	26	24
Seats before	26	24
Seats after	26	24
Seat change	Steady	Steady
- Results of the elections: Democratic gain Republican gain Democratic hold Republican hold No election
President of the Senate before election
Jack Kibbie
Democratic
Elected President of the Senate
Pam Jochum
Democratic

The 2012 Iowa State Senate elections took place as part of the biennial 2012 United States elections. Iowa voters elected state senators in 26 of the state senate's 50 districts—the 25 even-numbered state senate districts and the 49th district. State senators serve four-year terms in the Iowa State Senate, with half of the seats up for election each cycle. This was the first election cycle following the 2010 census and 2011 redistricting process.

As a result of redistricting, many state senators were redrawn into new seats. This explains some incumbents being reelected, but into districts with new numbers following the redistricting process.

The primary election on June 5, 2012, determined which candidates appeared on the November 6, 2012 general election ballot. Primary election results can be obtained here.

Following the previous 2010 Iowa Senate election, Democrats maintained control of the Iowa state Senate with 26 seats.

To reclaim control of the chamber from Democrats, the Republicans needed to net 2 Senate seats.

Democrats kept control of the Iowa State Senate following the 2012 general election as the chamber's partisan composition remained unchanged with 26 Democrats to 24 Republicans.

State Senator Pat Ward was running in district 22 when she died on October 15, 2012, less than a month before the general election. A special election on Dec. 11, 2012 saw her seat retained by the Republicans.

== Summary of Results ==
- NOTE: Only even-numbered Iowa Senate seats were up for regularly scheduled election in 2012, so most of the odd-numbered seats are not included here. District 49 had a special election to fill a vacancy created by Senator Bacon's resignation.
- Also note, an asterisk (*) after a senator's name indicates they were an incumbent re-elected, but to a new district number due to redistricting.

State Senate District	Incumbent	Party	Elected Senator	Party
2nd	Randy Feenstra	Rep	Randy Feenstra	Republican
4th	Jack Kibbie	Dem	Dennis Guth	Republican
6th	Merlin Bartz	Rep	Mark Segebart	Republican
8th	Mary Jo Wilhelm	Dem	Michael E. Gronstal*	Democratic
10th	Jeff Danielson	Dem	Jake Chapman	Republican
12th	Brian Schoenjahn	Dem	Joni Ernst*	Republican
14th	Pam Jochum	Dem	Amy Sinclair	Republican
16th	Tom Hancock	Dem	Dick Dearden*	Democratic
18th	Liz Mathis	Dem	Janet Petersen	Democratic
20th	Tim Kapucian	Rep	Brad Zaun*	Republican
22nd	Steve Sodders	Dem	Charles Schneider	Republican
24th	Jerry Behn	Rep	Jerry Behn	Republican
26th	Steve Kettering	Rep	Mary Jo Wilhelm*	Democratic
28th	James A. Seymour	Rep	Michael Breitbach	Republican
30th	Pat Ward	Rep	Jeff Danielson*	Democratic
32nd	Brad Zaun	Rep	Brian Schoenjahn*	Democratic
34th	Dick Dearden	Dem	Liz Mathis*	Democratic
36th	Paul McKinley	Rep	Steve Sodders*	Democratic
38th	Tom Rielly	Dem	Tim Kapucian*	Republican
40th	James F. Hahn	Rep	Ken Rozenboom	Republican
42nd	Shawn Hamerlinck	Rep	Rich Taylor	Democratic
44th	Thomas G. Courtney	Dem	Thomas G. Courtney	Democratic
46th	Gene Fraise	Dem	Chris Brase	Democratic
48th	Joni Ernst	Rep	Dan Zumbach	Republican
49th	Hubert Houser	Rep	Rita Hart	Democratic
50th	Michael Gronstal	Dem	Pam Jochum*	Democratic

== Predictions ==
Source	Ranking	As of
Governing	Tossup	October 24, 2012

== Detailed Results ==
- Note: If a district does not list a primary, then that district did not have a competitive primary (i.e., there may have only been one candidate file for that district).

=== District 2 ===
Iowa Senate, District 2 General Election, 2012
Party	Candidate	Votes	%
Republican	Randy Feenstra (incumbent)	26,030	100.0
Total votes		26,030	100.0
Republican hold			

=== District 4 ===
Iowa Senate, District 4 Republican Primary, 2012
Party	Candidate	Votes	%
Republican	Dennis Guth	2,581	52.5
Republican	James E. Black	2,333	47.5
Total votes		4,914	100.0

Iowa Senate, District 4 General Election, 2012
Party	Candidate	Votes	%
Republican	Dennis Guth	16,033	52.9
Democratic	Bob Jennings	14,299	47.1
Total votes		30,332	100.0
Republican gain from Democratic			

=== District 6 ===
Iowa Senate, District 6 Republican Primary, 2012
Party	Candidate	Votes	%
Republican	Mark Segebart	1,273	47.0
Republican	Adam Schweers	1,082	40.0
Republican	Matthew Biede	352	13.0
Total votes		2,707	100.0

Iowa Senate, District 6 General Election, 2012
Party	Candidate	Votes	%
Republican	Mark Segebart	16,023	57.1
Democratic	Mary C. Bruner	12,058	42.9
Total votes		28,081	100.0
Republican hold			

=== District 8 ===
Iowa Senate, District 8 General Election, 2012
Party	Candidate	Votes	%
Democratic	Michael E. Gronstal (incumbent) (Note: Redistricted from district 50 to 8.)	12,632	55.3
Republican	Al Ringgenberg	10,198	44.7
Total votes		22,830	100.0
Democratic hold			

=== District 10 ===
Iowa Senate, District 10 Republican Primary, 2012
Party	Candidate	Votes	%
Republican	Jake Chapman	1,800	65.5
Republican	Matthew T. Mardesen	949	34.5
Total votes		2,749	100.0

Iowa Senate, District 10 General Election, 2012
Party	Candidate	Votes	%
Republican	Jack Chapman	22,594	100.0
Total votes		22,594	100.0
Republican gain from Democratic			

=== District 12 ===
Iowa Senate, District 12 General Election, 2012
Party	Candidate	Votes	%
Republican	Joni Ernst (incumbent) (Note: Redistricted from district 48 to 12.)	22,205	100.0
Total votes		22,205	100.0
Republican gain from Democratic			

=== District 14 ===
Iowa Senate, District 14 Republican Primary, 2012
Party	Candidate	Votes	%
Republican	Amy Sinclair	2,652	66.1
Republican	Steven Everly	1,116	27.8
Republican	Stephanie Jones	247	6.1
Total votes		4,015	100.0

Iowa Senate, District 14 Democratic Primary, 2012
Party	Candidate	Votes	%
Democratic	Dick Schrad	775	67.4
Democratic	Jason Demichelis	375	32.6
Total votes		1,150	100.0

Iowa Senate, District 14 General Election, 2012
Party	Candidate	Votes	%
Republican	Amy Sinclair	17,141	60.9
Democratic	Dick Schrad	11,011	39.1
Total votes		28,152	100.0
Republican gain from Democratic			

=== District 16 ===
Iowa Senate, District 16 General Election, 2012
Party	Candidate	Votes	%
Democratic	Dick Dearden (incumbent) (Note: Redistricted from district 34 to 16.)	16,065	65.5
Republican	David Scott Edwards	8,469	34.5
Total votes		24,534	100.0
Democratic hold			

=== District 18 ===
Iowa Senate, District 18 General Election, 2012
Party	Candidate	Votes	%
Democratic	Janet Petersen	18,954	69.2
Republican	Vicki Stogdill	8,455	30.8
Total votes		27,409	100.0
Democratic hold			

=== District 20 ===
Iowa Senate, District 20 General Election, 2012
Party	Candidate	Votes	%
Republican	Brad Zaun (incumbent) (Note: Redistricted from district 32 to 20.)	24,236	100.0
Total votes		24,236	100.0
Republican hold			

=== District 22 ===
Iowa Senate, District 22 Republican Primary, 2012
Party	Candidate	Votes	%
Republican	Pat Ward (incumbent) (Note: Redistricted from district 30 to 22.)	1,818	58.0
Republican	Jeff Mullen	1,314	42.0
Total votes		3,132	100.0

Iowa Senate, District 22 General Election, 2012
Party	Candidate	Votes	%
Republican	Pat Ward (incumbent)	19,067	56.6
Democratic	Desmund Adams	14,626	43.4
Total votes		33,693	100.0
Republican gain from Democratic			

- Senator Ward died less than a month before the 2012 general election and, since the ballots had already been printed, won this election after having already deceased. A special election was held due to these circumstances.

Iowa Senate, District 22 Special Election, December 11, 2012
Party	Candidate	Votes	%
Republican	Charles Schneider (Note: Won a special election in district 22 following the death of Senator Ward.)	5,378	56.5
Democratic	Desmund Adams	4,136	43.5
Total votes		9,514	100.0
Republican hold			

=== District 24 ===
Iowa Senate, District 24 General Election, 2012
Party	Candidate	Votes	%
Republican	Jerry Behn (incumbent)	17,035	54.8
Democratic	Shelly Stotts	14,049	45.2
Total votes		31,084	100.0
Republican hold			

=== District 26 ===
Iowa Senate, District 26 General Election, 2012
Party	Candidate	Votes	%
Democratic	Mary Jo Wilhelm (incumbent) (Note: Redistricted from district 8 to 26.)	15,530	50.2
Republican	Merlin Bartz (incumbent) (Note: Redistricted from district 6 to 26.)	15,404	49.8
Total votes		30,934	100.0
Democratic gain from Republican			

=== District 28 ===
Iowa Senate, District 28 General Election, 2012
Party	Candidate	Votes	%
Republican	Michael Breitbach	14,867	50.06
Democratic	John Beard	14,833	49.94
Total votes		29,700	100.0
Republican hold			

=== District 30 ===
Iowa Senate, District 30 General Election, 2012
Party	Candidate	Votes	%
Democratic	Jeff Danielson (incumbent) (Note: Redistricted from district 10 to 30.)	16,946	51.0
Republican	Matt Reisetter	16,265	49.0
Total votes		33,211	100.0
Democratic gain from Republican			

=== District 32 ===
Iowa Senate, District 32 General Election, 2012
Party	Candidate	Votes	%
Democratic	Brian Schoenjahn (incumbent) (Note: Redistricted from district 12 to 32.)	16,338	53.2
Republican	Elliott Henderson	14,346	46.8
Total votes		30,684	100.0
Democratic gain from Republican			

=== District 34 ===
Iowa Senate, District 34 General Election, 2012
Party	Candidate	Votes	%
Democratic	Liz Mathis (incumbent) (Note: Redistricted from district 18 to 34.)	21,178	61.2
Republican	Ryan Flood	13,401	38.8
Total votes		34,579	100.0
Democratic hold			

=== District 36 ===
Iowa Senate, District 36 Republican Primary, 2012
Party	Candidate	Votes	%
Republican	Jane A. Jech	1,880	58.8
Republican	Larry McKibben	1,316	41.2
Total votes		3,196	100.0

Iowa Senate, District 36 General Election, 2012
Party	Candidate	Votes	%
Democratic	Steve Sodders (incumbent) (Note: Redistricted from district 22 to 36.)	15,733	54.1
Republican	Jane A. Jech	13,360	45.9
Total votes		29,093	100.0
Democratic gain from Republican			

=== District 38 ===
Iowa Senate, District 38 Democratic Primary, 2012
Party	Candidate	Votes	%
Democratic	Shelley Parbs	735	57.9
Democratic	Nicholas G. Volk	299	23.6
Democratic	LaForest Sherman	235	18.5
Total votes		1,269	100.0

Iowa Senate, District 38 General Election, 2012
Party	Candidate	Votes	%
Republican	Tim Kapucian (incumbent) (Note: Redistricted from district 20 to 38.)	17,124	54.8
Democratic	Shelley Parbs	14,137	45.2
Total votes		31,261	100.0
Republican gain from Democratic			

=== District 40 ===
Iowa Senate, District 40 General Election, 2012
Party	Candidate	Votes	%
Republican	Ken Rozenboom	17,628	60.2
Democratic	Tim Tripp	11,670	39.8
Total votes		29,298	100.0
Republican hold			

=== District 42 ===
Iowa Senate, District 42 Democratic Primary, 2012
Party	Candidate	Votes	%
Democratic	Rich Taylor	1,446	49.8
Democratic	Donna Amandus	1,032	35.6
Democratic	Bob Morawitz	423	14.6
Total votes		2,901	100.0

Iowa Senate, District 42 Republican Primary, 2012
Party	Candidate	Votes	%
Republican	Larry W. Kruse	2,324	71.1
Republican	Lee Harder	943	28.9
Total votes		3,267	100.0

Iowa Senate, District 42 General Election, 2012
Party	Candidate	Votes	%
Democratic	Rich Taylor	15,058	50.6
Republican	Larry W. Kruse	13,281	44.7
Independent	Michael Garmoe	1,396	4.7
Total votes		29,735	100.0
Democratic gain from Republican			

=== District 44 ===
Iowa Senate, District 44 General Election, 2012
Party	Candidate	Votes	%
Democratic	Thomas G. Courtney (incumbent)	16,125	57.0
Republican	Brad Bourn	12,168	43.0
Total votes		28,293	100.0
Democratic hold			

=== District 46 ===
Iowa Senate, District 46 Republican Primary, 2012
Party	Candidate	Votes	%
Republican	Shawn Hamerlinck (incumbent) (Note: Redistricted from district 42 to 46.)	1,476	60.9
Republican	James F. Hahn (incumbent) (Note: Redistricted from district 40 to 46.)	947	39.1
Total votes		2,423	100.0

Iowa Senate, District 46 General Election, 2012
Party	Candidate	Votes	%
Democratic	Chris Brase	15,960	53.4
Republican	Shawn Hamerlinck (incumbent)	13,950	46.6
Total votes		29,910	100.0
Democratic hold			

=== District 48 ===
Iowa Senate, District 48 Republican Primary, 2012
Party	Candidate	Votes	%
Republican	Dan Zumbach	1,479	78.8
Republican	Brian W. Cook	399	21.2
Total votes		1,878	100.0

Iowa Senate, District 48 General Election, 2012
Party	Candidate	Votes	%
Republican	Dan Zumbach	16,415	50.9
Democratic	Nate Willems	15,858	49.1
Total votes		32,273	100.0
Republican hold			

=== District 49 ===
Iowa Senate, District 49 Democratic Primary, 2012
Party	Candidate	Votes	%
Democratic	Rita Hart	1,289	53.5
Democratic	Dorothy O'Brien	1,121	46.5
Total votes		2,410	100.0

Iowa Senate, District 49 General Election, 2012
Party	Candidate	Votes	%
Democratic	Rita Hart	17,305	54.6
Republican	Andrew Naeve	14,398	45.4
Total votes		31,703	100.0
Democratic gain from Republican			

=== District 50 ===
Iowa Senate, District 50 Republican Primary, 2012
Party	Candidate	Votes	%
Republican	William Johnson	745	56.1
Republican	John E. Hulsizer, Jr.	584	43.9
Total votes		1,329	100.0

Iowa Senate, District 50 General Election, 2012
Party	Candidate	Votes	%
Democratic	Pam Jochum (incumbent) (Note: Redistricted from district 14 to 50.)	20,808	68.0
Republican	William Johnson	9,790	32.0
Total votes		30,598	100.0
Democratic hold			

== See also ==
- United States elections, 2012
- United States House of Representatives elections in Iowa, 2012
- Elections in Iowa
