= 2016 Iowa Senate election =

Iowa State Senate elections, 2016
- November 8, 2016

25 out of 50 seats in the Iowa State Senate 26 seats needed for a majority
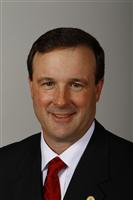

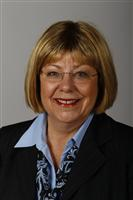

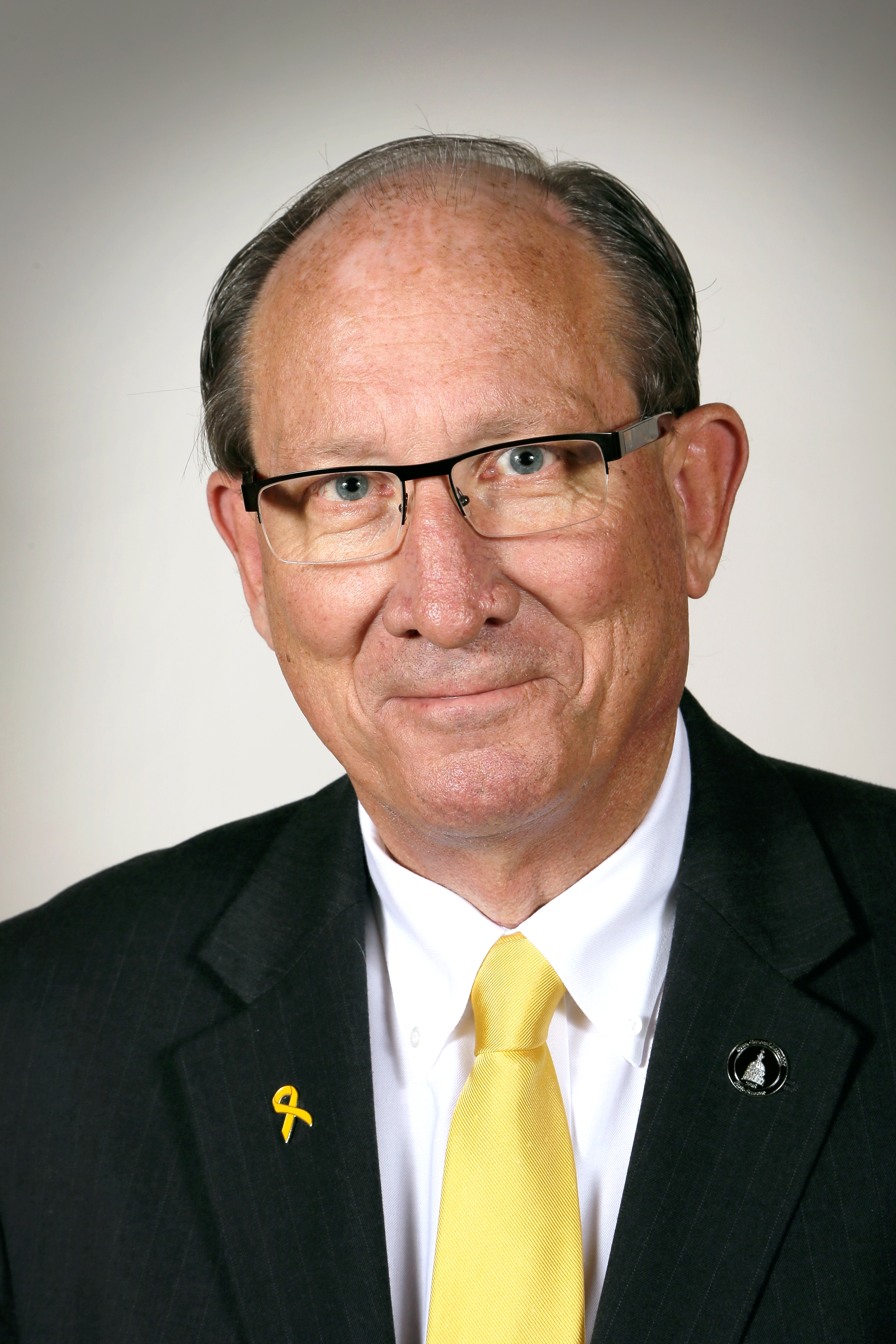
	Majority party	Minority party	Third party
Leader	Bill Dix	Pam Jochum	David Johnson
Party	Republican	Democratic	Independent
Leader's seat	25th district	50th district	1st district
Last election	24	26	0
Seats before	23	26	1
Seats after	29	20	1
Seat change	▲6	▼6	Steady
- Results of the elections: Republican gain Republican hold Democratic hold No election
President of the Senate before election
Pam Jochum
Democratic
Elected President of the Senate
Jack Whitver
Republican

The 2016 Iowa Senate election was held on November 8, 2016. The Senate seats for the twenty-five even-numbered districts were up for election. Senate terms are staggered so that half the membership is elected every two years, with each Senators serving a four-year term. Prior to the election, the Democrats were in the majority.

== Senate composition ==
Affiliation	Candidates	Votes	Vote %	Seats Won	Seats After
Republican	24	424,175	58.84%	19 (▲6)	29
Democratic	20	274,439	38.07%	6 (▼6)	20
Libertarian	6	15,512	2.15%	0	
Independent	1	6,755	0.94%	0	1
Total	51	720,881	100%	25	50

== Predictions ==
Source	Ranking	As of
Governing	Lean D	October 12, 2016

== Results ==
The election took place on November 8, 2016. Candidate list and results from the Iowa Secretary of State.

District	Party	Incumbent	Status	Party	Candidate	Votes	%
2	Republican	Randy Feenstra	Won re-election	Republican	Randy Feenstra	27,522	100%
4	Republican	Dennis Guth	Won re-election	Republican	Dennis Guth	18,359	60.7%
4	Republican	Dennis Guth	Won re-election	Democratic	Susan Bangert	11,880	39.3%
6	Republican	Mark Segebart	Won re-election	Republican	Mark Segebart	20,223	83.3%
6	Republican	Mark Segebart	Won re-election	Libertarian	Nick Serianni	4,044	16.7%
8	Democratic	Michael Gronstal	Lost re-election	Republican	Dan Dawson	12,379	54.1%
8	Democratic	Michael Gronstal	Lost re-election	Democratic	Michael Gronstal	10,510	45.9%
10	Republican	Jake Chapman	Won re-election	Republican	Jake Chapman	20,053	66.7%
10	Republican	Jake Chapman	Won re-election	Democratic	Matt Paladino	10,006	33.3%
12	Republican	Mark Costello	Won re-election	Republican	Mark Costello	20,012	78.4%
12	Republican	Mark Costello	Won re-election	Libertarian	Don W. Brantz	5,524	21.6%
14	Republican	Amy Sinclair	Won re-election	Republican	Amy Sinclair	19,482	74.3%
14	Republican	Amy Sinclair	Won re-election	Independent	Ruth Smith	6,755	25.7%
16	Democratic	Dick Dearden	Retired	Democratic	Nate Boulton	14,046	60%
16	Democratic	Dick Dearden	Retired	Republican	Mike Pryor	8,114	34.7%
16	Democratic	Dick Dearden	Retired	Libertarian	Christopher Whiteing	1,254	5.3%
18	Democratic	Janet Petersen	Won re-election	Democratic	Janet Petersen	20,388	100%
20	Republican	Brad Zaun	Won re-election	Republican	Brad Zaun	22,431	59.5%
20	Republican	Brad Zaun	Won re-election	Democratic	Miyoko Hikiji	15,238	40.5%
22	Republican	Charles Schneider	Won re-election	Democratic	Andrew Banes	15,343	44.1%
22	Republican	Charles Schneider	Won re-election	Republican	Charles Schneider	19,413	55.9%
24	Republican	Jerry Behn	Won re-election	Republican	Jerry Behn	19,435	63.8%
24	Republican	Jerry Behn	Won re-election	Democratic	Keith Puntenney	11,006	36.2%
26	Democratic	Mary Jo Wilhelm	Lost re-election	Republican	Waylon Brown	19,165	62.4%
26	Democratic	Mary Jo Wilhelm	Lost re-election	Democratic	Mary Jo Wilhelm	11,557	37.6%
28	Republican	Michael Breitbach	Won re-election	Democratic	Jan Heikes	10,823	36.1%
28	Republican	Michael Breitbach	Won re-election	Republican	Michael Breitbach	17,501	58.4%
28	Republican	Michael Breitbach	Won re-election	Libertarian	Troy Hageman	1,648	5.5%
30	Democratic	Jeff Danielson	Win re-election	Democratic	Jeff Danielson	19,568	58.7%
30	Democratic	Jeff Danielson	Win re-election	Republican	Bonnie Sadler	13,754	41.3%
32	Democratic	Brian Schoenjahn	Lost re-election	Republican	Craig Johnson	18,641	60%
32	Democratic	Brian Schoenjahn	Lost re-election	Democratic	Brian Schoenjahn	12,441	40%
34	Democratic	Liz Mathis	Won re-election	Democratic	Liz Mathis	20,008	56.1%
34	Democratic	Liz Mathis	Won re-election	Republican	Rene Gadelha	15,673	43.9%
36	Democratic	Steve Sodders	Lost re-election	Republican	Jeff Edler	14,731	52.9%
36	Democratic	Steve Sodders	Lost re-election	Democratic	Steve Sodders	13,111	47.1%
38	Republican	Tim Kapucian	Won re-election	Republican	Tim Kapucian	18,567	60%
38	Republican	Tim Kapucian	Won re-election	Democratic	Dennis Mathahs	10,524	34.1%
38	Republican	Tim Kapucian	Won re-election	Libertarian	John George	1,810	5.8%
40	Republican	Ken Rozenboom	Won re-election	Republican	Ken Rozenboom	23,768	100%
42	Democratic	Rich Taylor	Won re-election	Republican	Danny Graber	13,266	49.7%
42	Democratic	Rich Taylor	Won re-election	Democratic	Rich Taylor	13,434	50.3%
44	Democratic	Thomas G. Courtney	Lost re-election	Republican	Thomas A. Greene	14,410	52.6%
44	Democratic	Thomas G. Courtney	Lost re-election	Democratic	Thomas G. Courtney	13,000	47.4%
46	Democratic	Chris Brase	Lost re-election	Republican	Mark S. Lofgren	16,576	56.8%
46	Democratic	Chris Brase	Lost re-election	Democratic	Chris Brase	12,615	43.2%
48	Republican	Dan Zumbach	Won re-election	Republican	Dan Zumbach	20,065	62.9%
48	Republican	Dan Zumbach	Won re-election	Democratic	Scott Peterson	10,596	33.2%
48	Republican	Dan Zumbach	Won re-election	Libertarian	Brian W. Cook	1,232	3.9%
50	Democratic	Pam Jochum	Won re-election	Democratic	Pam Jochum	18,345	63.3%
50	Democratic	Pam Jochum	Won re-election	Republican	John Hulsizer Jr.	10,635	36.7%

== See also ==
- 2016 United States House of Representatives elections in Iowa
- Iowa Senate
- Iowa House of Representatives
- Iowa General Assembly
- Political party strength in U.S. states
