= 2018 Iowa Senate election =

2018 Iowa State Senate election
- November 6, 2018

25 out of 50 seats in the Iowa State Senate 26 seats needed for a majority
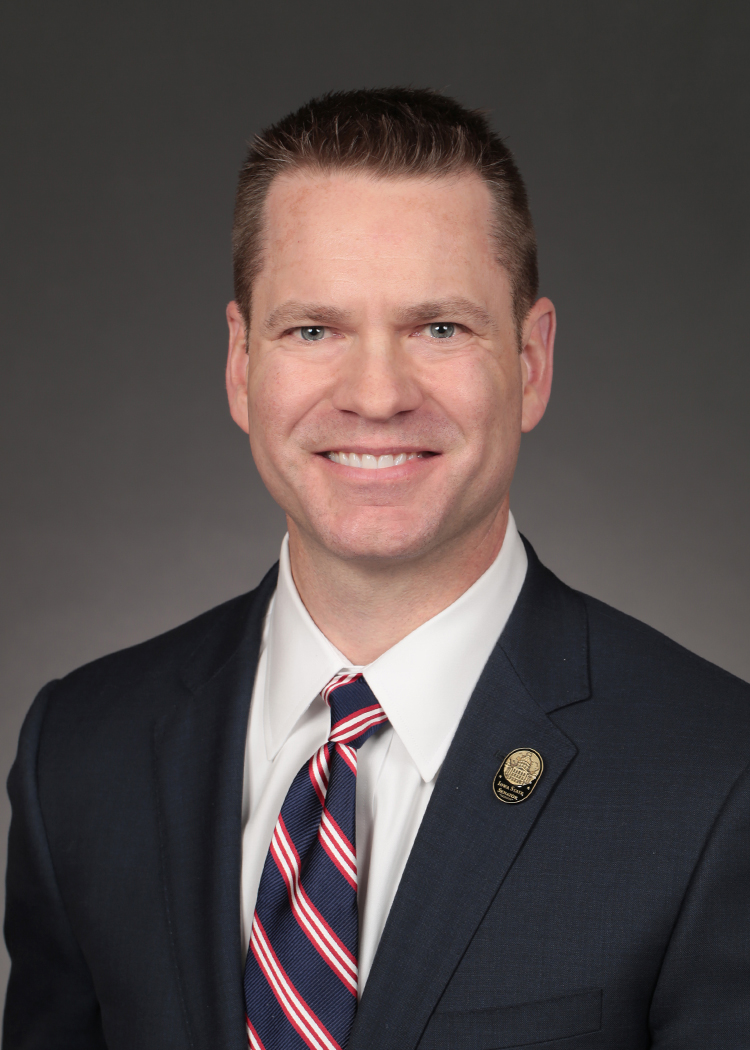

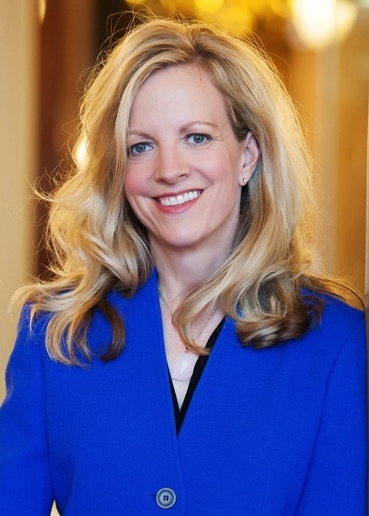

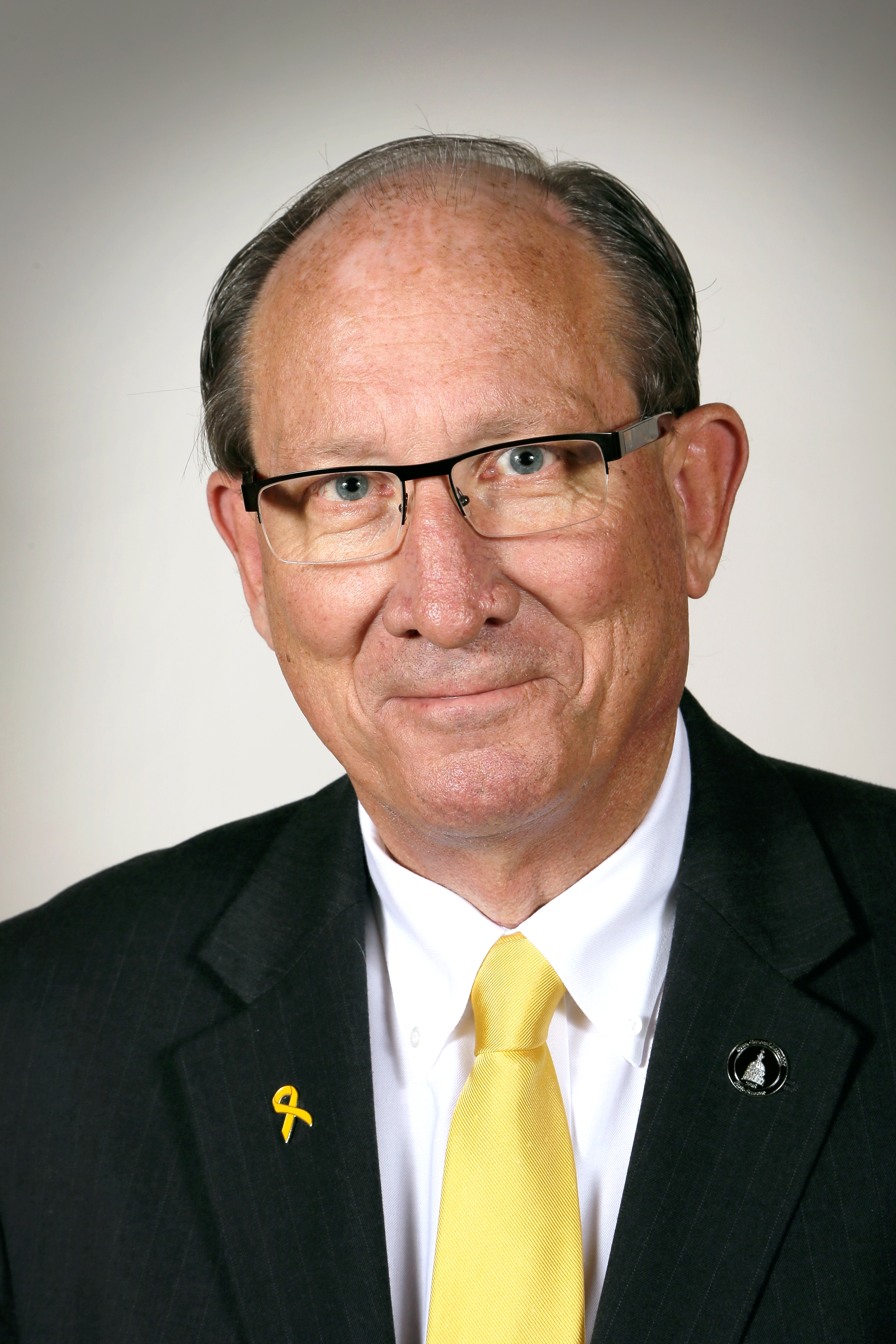
	Majority party	Minority party	Third party
Leader	Charles Schneider	Janet Petersen	David Johnson
Party	Republican	Democratic	Independent
Leader's seat	22nd district	18th district	1st district (retired)
Last election	29	20	1
Seats before	29	20	1
Seats after	32	18	0
Seat change	▲3	▼2	▼1
Popular vote	274,664	348,325
Percentage	44.09%	55.91%
- Results of the elections: Republican gain Democratic gain Republican hold Democratic hold No election
President of the Senate before election
Charles Schneider
Republican
Elected President of the Senate
Charles Schneider
Republican

The 2018 Iowa State Senate elections took place as part of the biennial 2018 United States elections. Iowa voters elected state senators in half of the state senate's districts—the 25 odd-numbered state senate districts. State senators serve four-year terms in the Iowa State Senate, with half of the seats up for election each cycle.

The primary election on June 5, 2018, determined which candidates appeared on the November 6, 2018 general election ballot. Primary election results can be obtained here.

Following the previous 2016 Iowa Senate election, Republicans flipped control of the Iowa State Senate, taking control away from the Democrats.

To reclaim control of the chamber from Republicans, the Democrats needed to net six Senate seats.

Republicans expanded their control of the Iowa State Senate following the 2018 general election, increasing their majority from 29 to 32 seats. Democrats saw their numbers dwindle from 20 to 18 seats. The lone independent member of the Iowa State Senate was replaced by a Republican as well.

== Results ==
- NOTE: Only odd-numbered Iowa Senate seats were up for election in 2018, so even-numbered seats are not included here.

State Senate district	Incumbent	Party	Elected Senator	Party
1st	David Johnson	Ind	Zach Whiting	Republican
3rd	Jim Carlin	Rep	Jim Carlin	Republican
5th	Tim Kraayenbrink	Rep	Tim Kraayenbrink	Republican
7th	Rick Bertrand	Rep	Jackie Smith	Democratic
9th	Jason Schultz	Rep	Jason Schultz	Republican
11th	Tom Shipley	Rep	Tom Shipley	Republican
13th	Julian Garrett	Rep	Julian Garrett	Republican
15th	Chaz Allen	Dem	Zach Nunn	Republican
17th	Tony Bisignano	Dem	Tony Bisignano	Democratic
19th	Jack Whitver	Rep	Jack Whitver	Republican
21st	Matt McCoy	Dem	Claire Celsi	Democratic
23rd	Herman Quirmbach	Dem	Herman Quirmbach	Democratic
25th	Annette Sweeney	Rep	Annette Sweeney	Republican
27th	Amanda Ragan	Dem	Amanda Ragan	Democratic
29th	Tod Bowman	Dem	Carrie Koelker	Republican
31st	William Dotzler	Dem	William Dotzler	Democratic
33rd	Rob Hogg	Dem	Rob Hogg	Democratic
35th	Wally Horn	Dem	Todd Taylor	Democratic
37th	Robert Dvorsky	Dem	Zach Wahls	Democratic
39th	Kevin Kinney	Dem	Kevin Kinney	Democratic
41st	Mark Chelgren	Rep	Mariannette Miller-Meeks	Republican
43rd	Joe Bolkcom	Dem	Joe Bolkcom	Democratic
45th	Jim Lykam	Dem	Jim Lykam	Democratic
47th	Roby Smith	Rep	Roby Smith	Republican
49th	Rita Hart	Dem	Chris Cournoyer	Republican

=== Closest races ===
Seats where the margin of victory was under 10%:

1. State Senate district 27, 2%
2. State Senate district 7, 2.6% gain
3. State Senate district 19, 2.8%
4. State Senate district 41, 3.6%
5. State Senate district 47, 5.6%
6. State Senate district 29, 7.2% gain
7. State Senate district 39, 9%
8. State Senate district 49, 9.8% gain

== Predictions ==
Source	Ranking	As of
Governing	Safe R	October 8, 2018

== Detailed results ==
- Reminder: Only odd-numbered Iowa Senate seats were up for election in 2018, so even-numbered seats are not included here.
- Note: If a district does not list a primary, then that district did not have a competitive primary (i.e., there may have only been one candidate file for that district).

=== District 1 ===
Iowa Senate, District 1 Republican primary, 2018
Party	Candidate	Votes	%
Republican	Zach Whiting	3,539	62.4
Republican	Brad D. Price	1,288	22.7
Republican	Jesse Wolfe	844	14.9
Total votes		5,671	100.0

Iowa Senate, District 1 general election, 2018
Party	Candidate	Votes	%
Republican	Zach Whiting	21,245	100.0
Total votes		21,245	100.0
Republican gain from Independent			

=== District 3 ===
Iowa Senate, District 3 general election, 2018
Party	Candidate	Votes	%
Republican	Jim Carlin (incumbent)	16,366	64.8
Democratic	Dave Dawson	8,884	35.2
Total votes		25,250	100.0
Republican hold			

=== District 5 ===
Iowa Senate, District 5 general election, 2018
Party	Candidate	Votes	%
Republican	Tim Kraayenbrink (incumbent)	14,571	62.0
Democratic	John J. O'Brien	8,935	38.0
Total votes		23,506	100.0
Republican hold			

=== District 7 ===
Iowa Senate, District 7 general election, 2018
Party	Candidate	Votes	%
Democratic	Jackie Smith	9,125	51.3
Republican	Rick Bertrand (incumbent)	8,676	48.7
Total votes		17,801	100.0
Democratic gain from Republican			

=== District 9 ===
Iowa Senate, District 9 general election, 2018
Party	Candidate	Votes	%
Republican	Jason Schultz (incumbent)	18,533	100.0
Total votes		18,533	100.0
Republican hold			

=== District 11 ===
Iowa Senate, District 11 general election, 2018
Party	Candidate	Votes	%
Republican	Tom Shipley (incumbent)	18,007	67.2
Democratic	Sara Ramsey	8,770	32.8
Total votes		26,777	100.0
Republican hold			

=== District 13 ===
Iowa Senate, District 13 general election, 2018
Party	Candidate	Votes	%
Republican	Julian Garrett (incumbent)	17,199	55.9
Democratic	Vicky Brenner	13,558	44.1
Total votes		30,757	100.0
Republican hold			

=== District 15 ===
Iowa Senate, District 15 general election, 2018
Party	Candidate	Votes	%
Republican	Zach Nunn	16,988	57.0
Democratic	Dan Nieland	12,830	43.0
Total votes		29,818	100.0
Republican gain from Democratic			

=== District 17 ===
Iowa Senate, District 17 general election, 2018
Party	Candidate	Votes	%
Democratic	Tony Bisignano (incumbent)	17,808	100.0
Total votes		17,808	100.0
Democratic hold			

=== District 19 ===
Iowa Senate, District 19 Republican primary, 2018
Party	Candidate	Votes	%
Republican	Jack Whitver (incumbent)	1,369	80.8
Republican	Brett H. Nelson	326	19.2
Total votes		1,695	100.0

Iowa Senate, District 19 general election, 2018
Party	Candidate	Votes	%
Republican	Jack Whitver (incumbent)	18,598	51.4
Democratic	Amber Gustafson	17,608	48.6
Total votes		36,206	100.0
Republican hold			

=== District 21 ===
Iowa Senate, District 21 Democratic primary, 2018
Party	Candidate	Votes	%
Democratic	Claire Celsi	5,287	58.1
Democratic	Connie Ryan	3,818	41.9
Total votes		9,105	100.0

Iowa Senate, District 21 general election, 2018
Party	Candidate	Votes	%
Democratic	Claire Celsi	20,499	66.1
Republican	Brian B. Bales	10,511	33.9
Total votes		31,010	100.0
Democratic hold			

=== District 23 ===
Iowa Senate, District 23 general election, 2018
Party	Candidate	Votes	%
Democratic	Herman C. Quirmbach (incumbent)	19,020	75.2
Libertarian	Eric Cooper	6,273	24.8
Total votes		25,293	100.0
Democratic hold			

=== District 25 ===
Iowa Senate, District 25 Republican primary, 2018
Party	Candidate	Votes	%
Republican	Annette Sweeney (incumbent)	2,731	82.8
Republican	Chad J. Buss	566	17.2
Total votes		3,297	100.0

Iowa Senate, District 25 general election, 2018
Party	Candidate	Votes	%
Republican	Annette Sweeney (incumbent)	16,621	61.6
Democratic	Tracy Freese	10,345	38.4
Total votes		26,966	100.0
Republican hold			

=== District 27 ===
Iowa Senate, District 27 general election, 2018
Party	Candidate	Votes	%
Democratic	Amanda Ragan (incumbent)	12,823	51.0
Republican	Shannon Latham	12,322	49.0
Total votes		25,145	100.0
Democratic hold			

=== District 29 ===
Iowa Senate, District 29 general election, 2018
Party	Candidate	Votes	%
Republican	Carrie Koelker	15,493	53.6
Democratic	Tod R. Bowman (incumbent)	13,437	46.4
Total votes		28,930	100.0
Republican gain from Democratic			

=== District 31 ===
Iowa Senate, District 31 general election, 2018
Party	Candidate	Votes	%
Democratic	Bill Dotzler (incumbent)	14,573	100.0
Total votes		14,573	100.0
Democratic hold			

=== District 33 ===
Iowa Senate, District 33 general election, 2018
Party	Candidate	Votes	%
Democratic	Robert M. Hogg (incumbent)	17,912	65.6
Republican	Edward Bernie Hayes	9,407	34.4
Total votes		27,319	100.0
Democratic hold			

=== District 35 ===
Iowa Senate, District 35 general election, 2018
Party	Candidate	Votes	%
Democratic	Todd Taylor	19,875	100.0
Total votes		19,875	100.0
Democratic hold			

=== District 37 ===
Iowa Senate, District 37 Democratic primary, 2018
Party	Candidate	Votes	%
Democratic	Zach Wahls	3,902	59.6
Democratic	Janice Weiner	2,281	34.9
Democratic	Eric Dirth	189	2.9
Democratic	Imad Youssif	169	2.6
Total votes		6,541	100.0

Iowa Senate, District 37 general election, 2018
Party	Candidate	Votes	%
Democratic	Zach Wahls	20,321	78.5
Libertarian	Carl A. Krambeck	5,566	21.5
Total votes		25,887	100.0
Democratic hold			

=== District 39 ===
Iowa Senate, District 39 general election, 2018
Party	Candidate	Votes	%
Democratic	Kevin Kinney (incumbent)	15,758	54.5
Republican	Heather Hora	13,130	45.5
Total votes		28,888	100.0
Democratic hold			

=== District 41 ===
Iowa Senate, District 41 Republican primary, 2018
Party	Candidate	Votes	%
Republican	Mariannette Miller-Meeks	1,706	85.9
Republican	Daniel Cesar	279	14.1
Total votes		1,985	100.0

Iowa Senate, District 41 Democratic primary, 2018
Party	Candidate	Votes	%
Democratic	Mary S. Stewart	2,916	58.4
Democratic	Ed Malloy	2,076	41.6
Total votes		4,992	100.0

Iowa Senate, District 41 general election, 2018
Party	Candidate	Votes	%
Republican	Mariannette Miller-Meeks	11,460	51.8
Democratic	Mary S. Stewart	10,652	48.2
Total votes		22,112	100.0
Republican hold			

=== District 43 ===
Iowa Senate, District 43 general election, 2018
Party	Candidate	Votes	%
Democratic	Joe Bolkcom (incumbent)	23,790	79.6
Republican	Patrick Joseph Wronkiewicz	6,107	20.4
Total votes		29,897	100.0
Democratic hold			

=== District 45 ===
Iowa Senate, District 45 general election, 2018
Party	Candidate	Votes	%
Democratic	Jim Lykam (incumbent)	14,629	100.0
Total votes		14,629	100.0
Democratic hold			

=== District 47 ===
Iowa Senate, District 47 general election, 2018
Party	Candidate	Votes	%
Republican	Roby Smith (incumbent)	16,125	52.8
Democratic	Marie Gleason	14,418	47.2
Total votes		30,543	100.0
Republican hold			

=== District 49 ===
Iowa Senate, District 49 general election, 2018
Party	Candidate	Votes	%
Republican	Chris Cournoyer	13,305	54.9
Democratic	Patti Robinson	10,916	45.1
Total votes		24,221	100.0
Republican gain from Democratic			

== See also ==
- United States elections, 2018
- United States House of Representatives elections in Iowa, 2018
- Elections in Iowa
