= Rich Taylor =

Rich Taylor may refer to:

- Richard E. Taylor (1929–2018), Canadian physicist
- Rich Taylor (politician) (born 1954), Iowa state senator
