= Segebart =

Segebart is a surname. Notable people with the surname include:

- Kyle Segebart (born 1987), American soccer player
- Mark Segebart (born 1950), American politician
