= Matt Reisetter =

American politician

Member of the Iowa House of Representatives from the 76th district
- Member-elect
- Assumed office January 1, 2027
- Preceded by: Derek Wulf

Personal details
- Party: Republican
- Education: University of Northern Iowa
- Website: mattforiowa.com

Matt Reisetter is an American politician. A member of the Republican Party, he was elected to the Iowa House of Representatives in 2026, representing the 76th district. He succeeded fellow Republican Derek Wulf in the 2026 election. Reisetter is the head girls basketball coach at Waterloo Christian High School. He was mayor of Hudson, Iowa. He was a candidate in the 2012 Iowa Senate election.
