= 2020 Iowa elections =

A general election was held in the U.S. state of Iowa on November 3, 2020.

== State offices ==
=== State senate ===
25 out of the 50 seats in the Iowa Senate, the even-numbered districts, were up for election. Out of the contested seats, the Republican Party won 19 districts and the Democratic Party won 6 districts. The resulting composition was 32 Republicans and 18 Democrats. The Republicans gained the 42nd district while the Democrats gained the 22nd district, resulting in no net seat change.

=== State House of Representatives ===
All 100 seats in the Iowa House of Representatives were up for election. Republicans won 59 seats and Democrats won 41 seats. Republicans gained 6 seats.

=== State Supreme Court ===
4 out of the 7 justices in the Iowa Supreme Court were up for retention election for a new term of up to 8 years.

Retain Justice Susan Kay Christensen
| Choice | Votes | % |
|---|---|---|
| For | 859,886 | 73.03 |
| Against | 317,598 | 26.97 |
| Total | 1,177,484 | 100.00 |
| Valid votes | 1,177,484 | 69.26 |
| Invalid/blank votes | 522,646 | 30.74 |
| Total votes | 1,700,130 | 100.00 |

Retain Justice Edward Mansfield
| Choice | Votes | % |
|---|---|---|
| For | 802,356 | 69.24 |
| Against | 356,374 | 30.76 |
| Total | 1,158,730 | 100.00 |
| Valid votes | 1,158,730 | 68.16 |
| Invalid/blank votes | 541,400 | 31.84 |
| Total votes | 1,700,130 | 100.00 |

Retain Justice Christopher McDonald
| Choice | Votes | % |
|---|---|---|
| For | 825,661 | 71.29 |
| Against | 332,499 | 28.71 |
| Total | 1,158,160 | 100.00 |
| Valid votes | 1,158,160 | 68.12 |
| Invalid/blank votes | 541,970 | 31.88 |
| Total votes | 1,700,130 | 100.00 |

Retain Justice Thomas Waterman
| Choice | Votes | % |
|---|---|---|
| For | 809,058 | 69.88 |
| Against | 348,665 | 30.12 |
| Total | 1,157,723 | 100.00 |
| Valid votes | 1,157,723 | 68.10 |
| Invalid/blank votes | 542,407 | 31.90 |
| Total votes | 1,700,130 | 100.00 |

=== State Court of Appeals ===
4 out of the 9 judges in the Iowa Court of Appeals were up for retention election for a new term of up to 6 years.

Retain Judge Thomas N. Bower
| Choice | Votes | % |
|---|---|---|
| For | 817,409 | 73.44 |
| Against | 295,628 | 26.56 |
| Total | 1,113,037 | 100.00 |
| Valid votes | 1,113,037 | 65.47 |
| Invalid/blank votes | 587,093 | 34.53 |
| Total votes | 1,700,130 | 100.00 |

Retain Judge David May
| Choice | Votes | % |
|---|---|---|
| For | 812,162 | 73.17 |
| Against | 297,854 | 26.83 |
| Total | 1,110,016 | 100.00 |
| Valid votes | 1,110,016 | 65.29 |
| Invalid/blank votes | 590,114 | 34.71 |
| Total votes | 1,700,130 | 100.00 |

Retain Judge Julie A. Schumacher
| Choice | Votes | % |
|---|---|---|
| For | 856,450 | 76.19 |
| Against | 267,699 | 23.81 |
| Total | 1,124,149 | 100.00 |
| Valid votes | 1,124,149 | 66.12 |
| Invalid/blank votes | 575,981 | 33.88 |
| Total votes | 1,700,130 | 100.00 |

Retain Judge Sharon Soorholtz Greer
| Choice | Votes | % |
|---|---|---|
| For | 825,999 | 74.20 |
| Against | 287,186 | 25.80 |
| Total | 1,113,185 | 100.00 |
| Valid votes | 1,113,185 | 65.48 |
| Invalid/blank votes | 586,945 | 34.52 |
| Total votes | 1,700,130 | 100.00 |

== Federal offices ==
=== President and vice president of the United States ===
Iowa had 6 electoral votes in the Electoral College. Republican Donald Trump won all of them with 53% of the popular vote.

=== U.S. Senate ===
One of the two United States Senators of Iowa was up for election. Incumbent Republican Joni Ernst won re-election with 52% of the votes.

=== U.S. House of Representatives ===
All 4 of Iowa's representatives in the United States House of Representatives were up for election. Republicans won 3 seats and Democrats won 1 seat. The Republicans gained two seats, the 1st and 2nd districts.

== Ballot measure ==
=== Constitutional Convention Question (2020) ===
Constitutional Convention Question (2020)
| Choice | Votes | % |
|---|---|---|
| For | 408,746 | 29.58 |
| Against | 972,930 | 70.42 |
| Total | 1,381,676 | 100.00 |
| Valid votes | 1,381,676 | 81.27 |
| Invalid/blank votes | 318,454 | 18.73 |
| Total votes | 1,700,130 | 100.00 |

Constitutional Convention Question results by county No: 80–90%; 70–80%; 60–70%

== See also ==
- Elections in Iowa
- Politics of Iowa
- Political party strength in Iowa
