= Sarah Trone Garriott =

American politician (born 1978)

The Reverend Sarah Trone Garriott
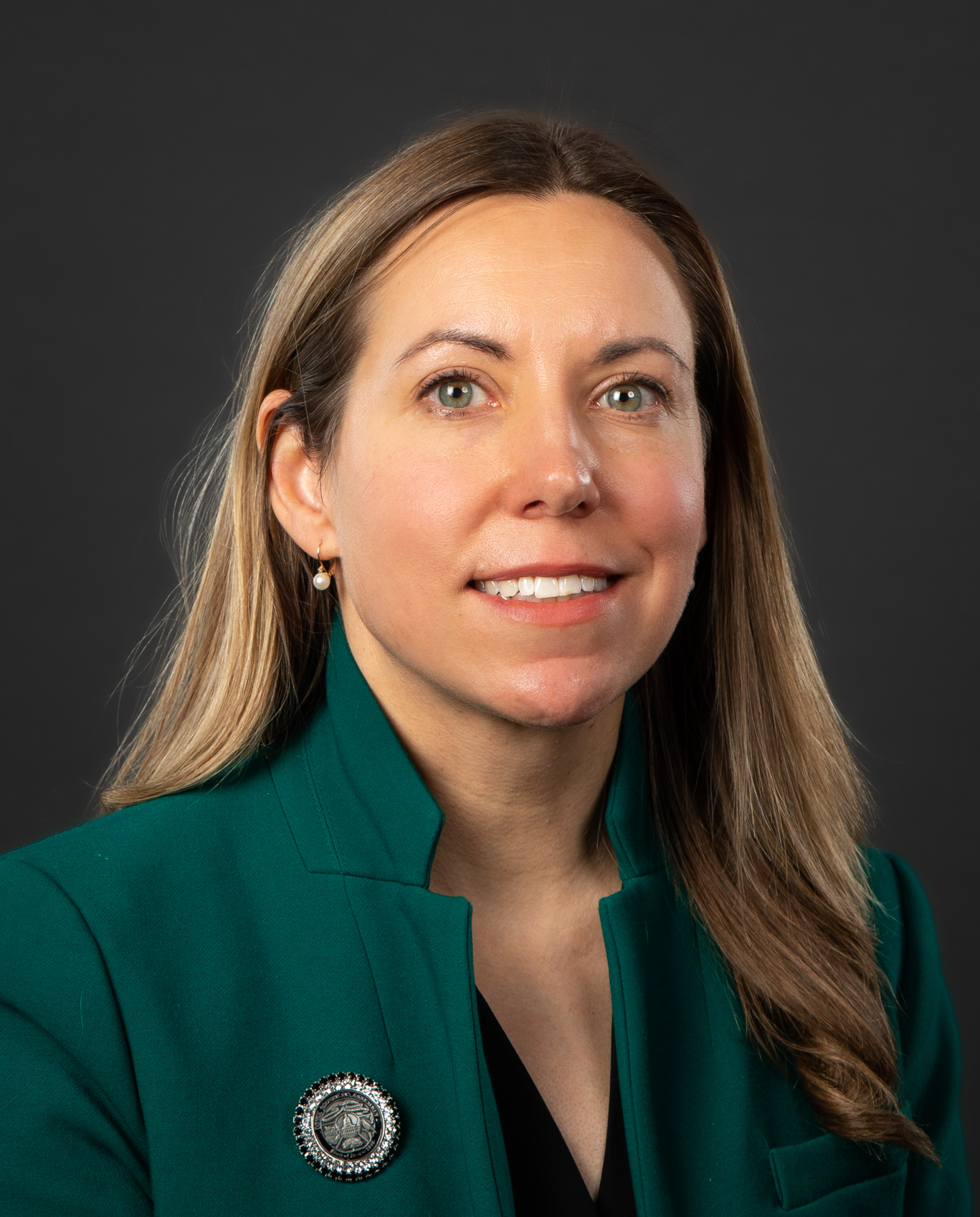
- Official portrait, 2023

Member-elect of the U.S. House of Representatives from Iowa's 3rd district
- Assuming office January 3, 2027
- Succeeding: Zach Nunn

Member of the Iowa Senate
- Incumbent
- Assumed office January 11, 2021
- Preceded by: Charles Schneider
- Constituency: 22nd district (2021–2023); 14th district (2023–present)

Personal details
- Born: Sarah Trone; May 21, 1978 (age 48) Minneapolis, Minnesota, U.S.
- Party: Democratic
- Spouse: William Garriott
- Children: 2
- Education: College of St. Scholastica (BA); Harvard University (MTS); Lutheran School of Theology (MDiv)
- Website: State Senate website Campaign website

Sarah Trone Garriott (born May 21, 1978) is an American politician and minister who is the U.S. representative-elect for Iowa's 3rd congressional district. A member of the Democratic Party, she is also serving as a member of the Iowa Senate from the 14th district since 2021, representing part of Dallas County in the Des Moines area and served previously as Senate minority whip.

== Early life and education ==
Garriott was born in Minneapolis. She earned a Bachelor of Arts degree in history from the College of St. Scholastica, a Master of Theological Studies from the Harvard Divinity School, and a Master of Divinity from the Lutheran School of Theology at Chicago. After earning her undergraduate degree, Garriott worked as a volunteer with AmeriCorps VISTA in New Mexico.

== Ministry career ==
Garriott is ordained in the Evangelical Lutheran Church in America (ELCA). In 2004 and 2005, Garriott was a chaplain at the Thomas Jefferson University Hospital in Philadelphia. From 2005 to 2008, she was a chaplain at Lurie Children's Hospital in Chicago. She later worked as a pastor at Lutheran churches in Bergton, Virginia, and Clive, Iowa. Since 2017, Garriott works as the coordinator of interfaith engagement at the Des Moines Area Religious Council.

== Iowa Senate ==
=== Elections ===
Garriott was elected to the Iowa Senate from the 22nd district in November 2020, winning the open seat following the retirement of incumbent Republican Charles Schneider. She defeated Clive mayor Scott Cirksena with 51.1% of the vote, after campaigning on expanding access to affordable health care.

In 2022, following redistricting that paired her with another Democratic incumbent, Garriott chose to run in the newly drawn 14th district, where she defeated the Iowa Senate president Jake Chapman by 51.5% to 48.5% of the vote in the most expensive Iowa legislative race of the year. She was reelected in 2024 after defeating Republican nominee Mark Hanson, a Dallas County supervisor, by 29 votes following a recount, receiving 20,467 votes to Hanson's 20,438.

=== Tenure ===
During the 90th General Assembly, Garriott served as the senate minority whip. In 2023, she introduced legislation to expand access to school-based mental health services through Medicaid by allowing students to receive services before receiving a formal diagnosis. Following the 2024 Perry High School shooting, she renewed calls to increase mental health resources in Iowa schools. During Senate debate of House File 954 in 2025, she introduced an unsuccessful amendment that would have allowed local governments to conduct elections using ranked-choice voting.

Garriott serves on the Education Committee and is ranking member of the Health and Human Services Committee. She previously served on the Commerce and Human Resources committees and the Health and Human Services Appropriations Subcommittee, and was ranking member of the Natural Resources and Environment Committee.

== 2026 U.S. House of Representatives campaign ==
On May 5, 2025, Garriott announced her candidacy for United States House of Representatives in Iowa's 3rd congressional district. She ran uncontested in the Democratic primary, advancing to the November 2026 general election.

During the general election campaign, she has emphasized health care issues, including restoring federal Medicaid funding and extending premium subsidies through the Affordable Care Act. She also supported expanding access to health insurance through a public option and opposed cuts to federal cancer research funding. She was able to unseat incumbent Zach Nunn, 53.6% oto 46.4%.

== Personal life ==
Garriott is married to William Garriott, a professor at Drake University. They live in West Des Moines with their two sons.

U.S. House of Representatives
Preceded by Zach Nunn	Member of the U.S. House of Representatives from Iowa's 3rd congressional district Taking office 2027	Elect
