= Jeff Reichman =

American politician

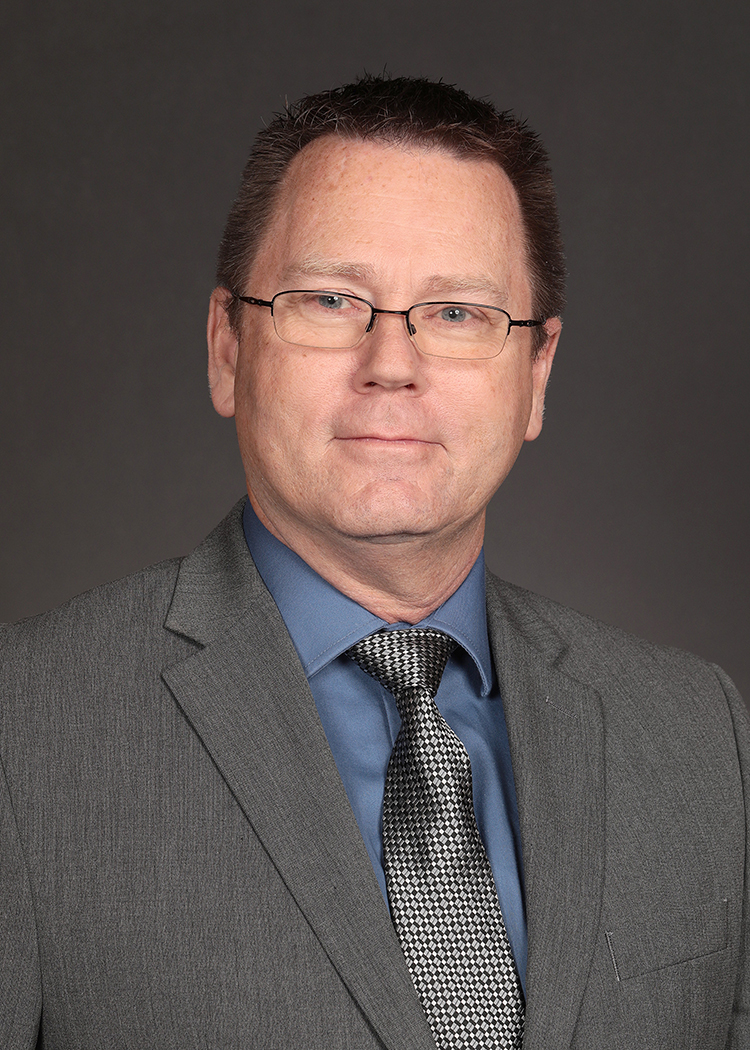

Member of the Iowa Senate from the 50th district
- Incumbent
- Assumed office January 11, 2021
- Preceded by: Rich Taylor
- Constituency: District 50 - (2023-Present); District 42 - (2021-2023)

Personal details
- Born: Jeffrey David Reichman; November 28, 1966 (age 59) Keokuk, Iowa, U.S.
- Party: Republican
- Education: Southeastern Community College (AS); Iowa Wesleyan University (BBA)

Military service
- Branch/service: United States Marine Corps
- Battles/wars: Iraq War

Jeff Reichman is an American politician serving as a member of the Iowa Senate from the 50th district. Elected in November 2020, he assumed office on January 11, 2021.

== Early life and education ==
Reichman was born in Keokuk, Iowa. After graduating from Keokuk High School, Reichman earned an associate degree from Southeastern Community College and a Bachelor of Business Administration from Iowa Wesleyan University.

== Career ==
Reichman served in the United States Marine Corps, retiring with the rank of Lieutenant Colonel. During his career, he served two tours in Iraq. After retiring from the military, he founded Tri-State Home Inspection. Reichman was elected to the Iowa Senate in November 2020 and assumed office on January 11, 2021. Reichman serves as vice chair of the state Senate Veterans Affairs Committee and is a member of the Iowa Innovation Council.

Iowa Senate
Preceded by Rich Taylor	42nd District; 2021 – 2023	Succeeded by Charlie McClintock
Preceded by Pam Jochum	50th District; 2023 – Present	Succeeded by Incumbent
