= Steve Sodders =

American politician

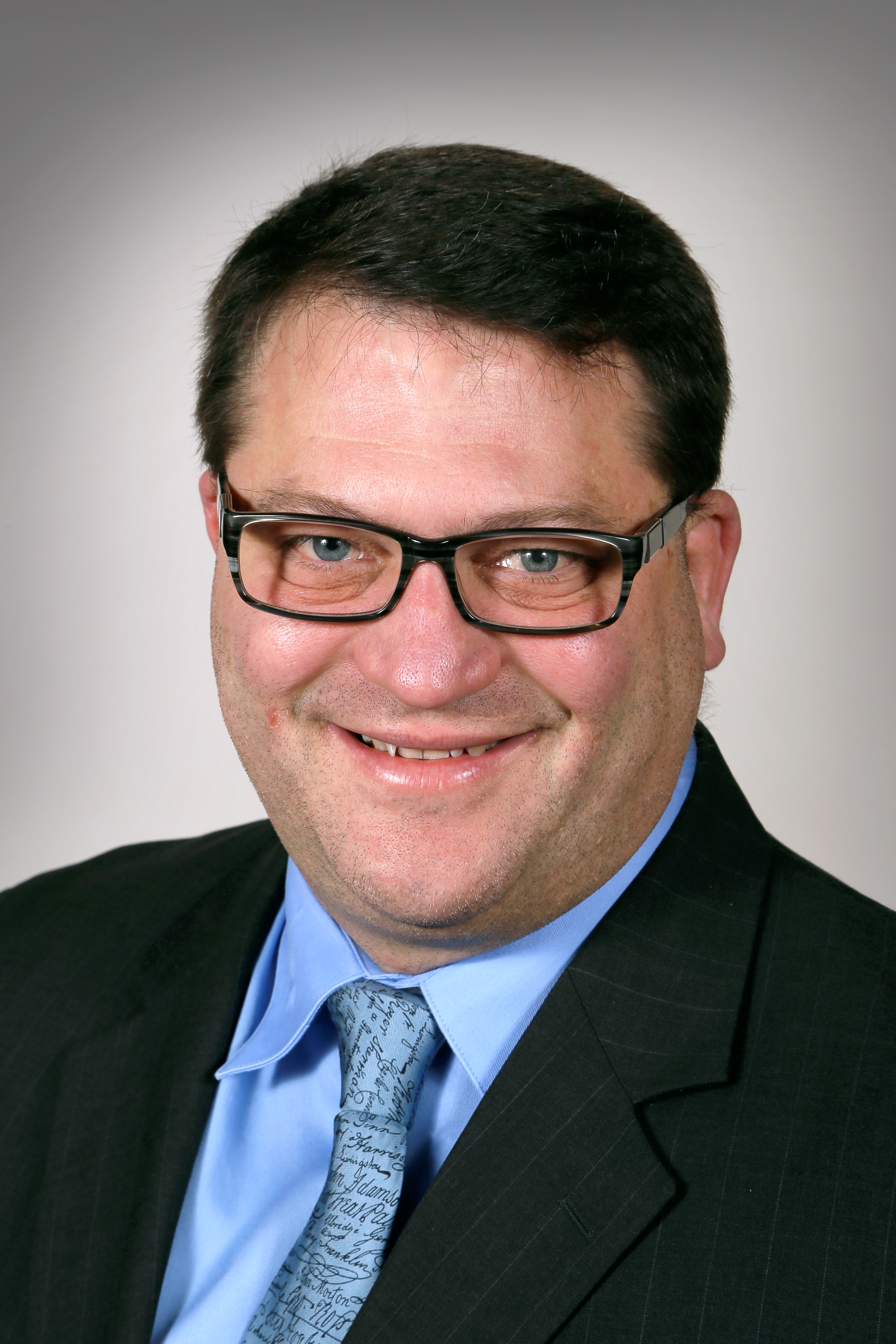
- Official portrait, 2015

Member of the Iowa Senate
- In office 9 January 2009 – 8 January 2017
- Preceded by: Larry McKibben
- Succeeded by: Jeff Edler
- Constituency: 22nd district (2009–2013); 36th district (2013–2017)

Personal details
- Born: 1968 (age 57–58) Ames, Iowa, U.S.
- Party: Democratic
- Spouse: Carrie
- Children: 2
- Education: Iowa State University (Attending); Iowa Valley Community College (A.S.)
- Occupation: Deputy Sheriff
- Website: Sodders' website

Steven J. "Steve" Sodders was a Democratic politician, who was a Mayor of State Center, Iowa. He also served as Deputy Sheriff in Marshall County until he was forced into early retirement for falsifying records. He represented the 22nd and 36th Districts in the Iowa Senate between 2009 and 2017. He received his A.S. from Iowa Valley Community College and is attending Iowa State University, pursuing a degree in Sociology. He received an honorary degree in Educational Leadership from Iowa Valley Community College. He currently is attending Bellevue University to receive a BA degree Security and Investigations studies.

Sodders served on several committees in the Iowa Senate - Chair Economic Growth committee; the Education committee; Vice-chair Government Oversight committee; the ChairJudiciary Committee; the State Government Committee; and the Veterans Affairs committee.

Sodders was elected in 2008 with 14,837 votes, defeating Republican opponent Jarret P. Heil.

Iowa Senate
Preceded by Larry McKibben	22nd District; 2009–2013	Succeeded by Charles Schneider
Preceded by Paul McKinley	36th District; 2013–2017	Succeeded by Jeff Edler
