= Pat Ward (politician) =

American politician

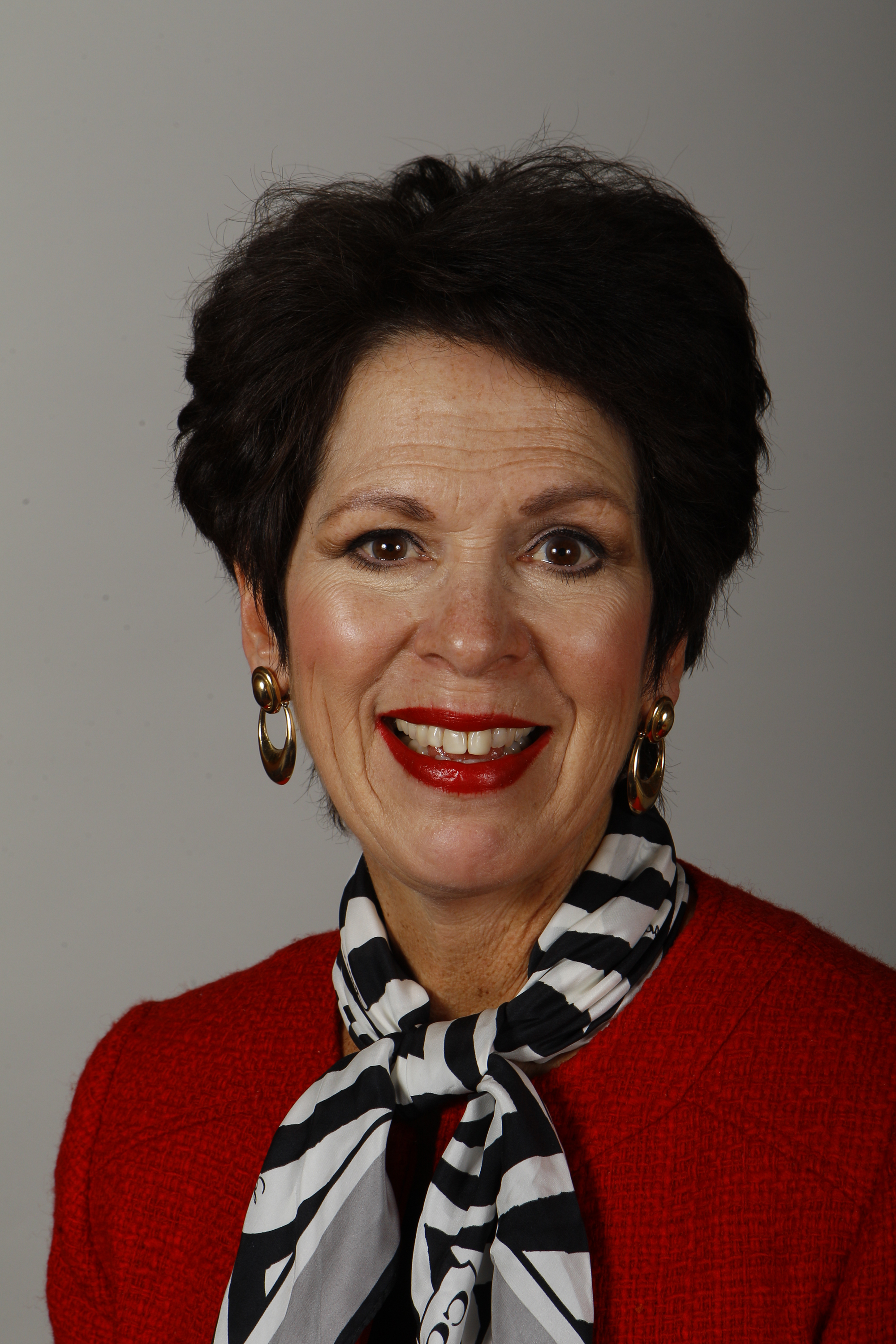

Member of the Iowa Senate from the 30 district
- In office 2004–2012
- Preceded by: Mary Kramer
- Succeeded by: Charles Schneider

Personal details
- Born: June 17, 1957 Clinton, Missouri, U.S.
- Died: October 15, 2012 (aged 55) Des Moines, Iowa, U.S.
- Party: Republican
- Spouse: John
- Children: 2
- Education: Central Missouri State University (B.S.)
- Occupation: Politician and government relations executive
- Website: Official website

Petricia S. "Pat" Ward (June 17, 1957 – October 15, 2012) was an Iowa State Senator from the 30th District. A Republican, her service in the Iowa Senate began in 2004, when she won a special election to fill the vacancy left when Mary Kramer was appointed to be U.S. Ambassador to Barbados. It ended with her death in 2012. She had a B.S. in Business and Legal Studies from Central Missouri State University.

== Senate career ==
Ward served on several committees in the Iowa Senate - the Commerce committee; the Environment and Energy Independence; the Judiciary committee; the Ways and Means committee; the Government Oversight committee, where she was the ranking member; and the Labor and Business Relations committee, where she was the ranking member. She ran unopposed in the Iowa Senate District 30 Republican Primary on June 8, 2004, and she took 62% of the vote in the general election November 2, 2004, defeating both Satro Narayan (Democrat) and Sean Edward Martin (Libertarian). Ward was last re-elected in 2008 with 21,842 votes, running unopposed. Ward was running for re-election when she died and remained on the November 2012 ballot. At the time of her death, she was serving as the Assistant Minority Leader of the Iowa Senate. As ballots for the 2012 election were already printed, she remained on the ballot for the election. State law mandated a special election be held to determine Ward's successor, which was held on December 11, 2012.

== Death ==
On October 15, 2012, Iowa state officials announced that Ward had died at the age of 55 following a battle with breast cancer.

Iowa Senate
Preceded by Mary Kramer	30th District; 2004 – 2012	Succeeded by Charles Schneider
