= Iowa's 28th Senate district =

American legislative district

Senate District 28
- Type: District of the Upper House
- Location: Northeast Iowa
- Senator: Mike Klimesh (R)
- Parent organization: Iowa General Assembly

The 28th District of the Iowa Senate is located in northern Iowa, and is currently composed of Hancock, Humboldt, Wright, Franklin, and Hamilton counties, as well as part of Story County.

== Current elected officials ==
Mike Klimesh is the senator currently representing the 28th District.

The area of the 28th District contains two Iowa House of Representatives districts:

- The 55th District (represented by Michael Bergan)
- The 56th District (represented by Anne Osmundson)

The district is also located in Iowa's 1st congressional district, which is represented by U.S. Representative Ashley Hinson.

== Past senators ==
The district has previously been represented by:

- Jeremiah Jenkins, 1856–1859
- D. Hammer, 1860–1863
- Josiah Hatch, 1864–1865
- Jonathan Cattell, 1866–1869
- Frank Campbell, 1870–1873
- Thomas Mitchell, 1874–1877
- John Nichols, 1878–1883
- Preston Sutton, 1884–1887
- William Mills, 1888–1891
- George Turner, 1892–1895
- J.L. Carney, 1896–1899
- J.B. Classen, 1900–1903
- Charles Eckles, 1904–1908
- Comfort Harvey Van Law, 1909–1912
- Wallace Arney, 1913–1918
- Ray Scott, 1919–1922
- William McLeland, 1923–1932
- Chris Reese, 1933–1936
- Benjamin Chase Whitehill, 1937–1946
- Robert Rockhill, 1947–1948
- W. Eldon Walter, 1949–1956
- Howard Buck, 1957–1964
- Warren Kruck, 1965–1968
- R. Dean Arbuckle, 1969–1972
- Karl Nolin, 1973–1976
- Bill Hutchins, 1977–1982
- Richard Drake, 1983–1992
- Andy McKean, 1993–2002
- James Seymour, 2003–2012
- Michael Breitbach, 2013–2021
- Mike Klimesh, 2021–present

Note: the boundaries of districts have changed over history. Previous politicians of a specific numbered district have represented a completely different geographic area, due to redistricting.

== See also ==
- Iowa General Assembly
- Iowa Senate
