= Jeff Edler =

American politician

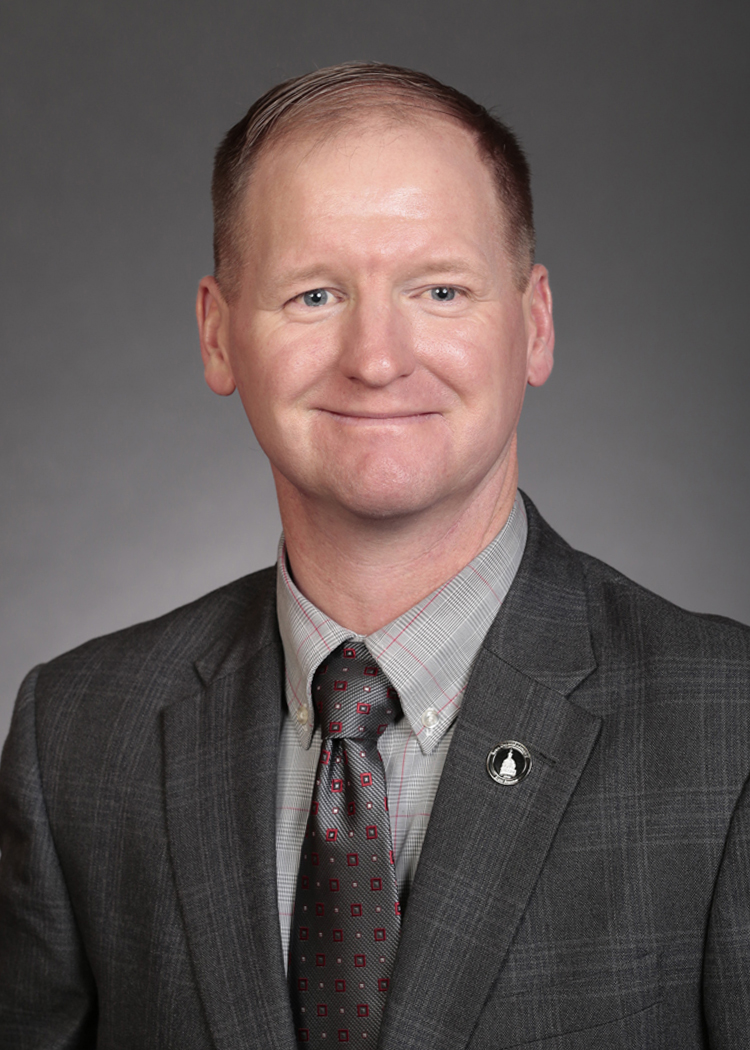

Member of the Iowa Senate from the 26th district
- In office January 14, 2017 – January 1, 2025
- Preceded by: Steve Sodders
- Succeeded by: Kara Warme
- Constituency: District 26 - (2023-Present); District 36 - (2017-2023)

Personal details
- Born: August 17, 1976 (age 50) State Center, Iowa, U.S.
- Party: Republican
- Spouse: Stephanie
- Children: 5
- Education: Iowa State University
- Occupation: Farmer

Jeff Edler (born August 17, 1976) is an Iowa politician who served as the State Senator from the 26th District. A Republican, he served in the Iowa Senate from the 2016 election, defeating Democratic incumbent Steve Sodders, to his retirement at the 2024 election. He is a resident of State Center, Iowa and is married to Stephanie with six children. Edler is a farmer and Consumers Energy Rural Electric Cooperative board president.

As of February 2020, Edler serves on the following committees: Local Government (Chair), Agriculture, Education, Human Resources, Veterans Affairs, and Ways and Means. He also serves on the Health and Human Services Appropriations Subcommittee (Vice Chair), as well as the International Relations Committee, the Children's Behavioral Health System State Board, Education Commission of the States, and the Mental Health and Disability Services Commission.

== Electoral history ==
Iowa Senate 36th District election, 2018
Party	Candidate	Votes	%
Republican	Jeff Edler	14,731	52.91%
Democratic	Steve Sodders	13,111	47.09%
Republican gain from Democratic			

Iowa Senate
Preceded by Waylon Brown	26th District; 2023 – 2025	Succeeded by Kara Warme
Preceded by Steve Sodders	36th District; 2017 – 2023	Succeeded by Pam Jochum
