= James Seymour (Iowa politician) =

American politician

James A. Seymour
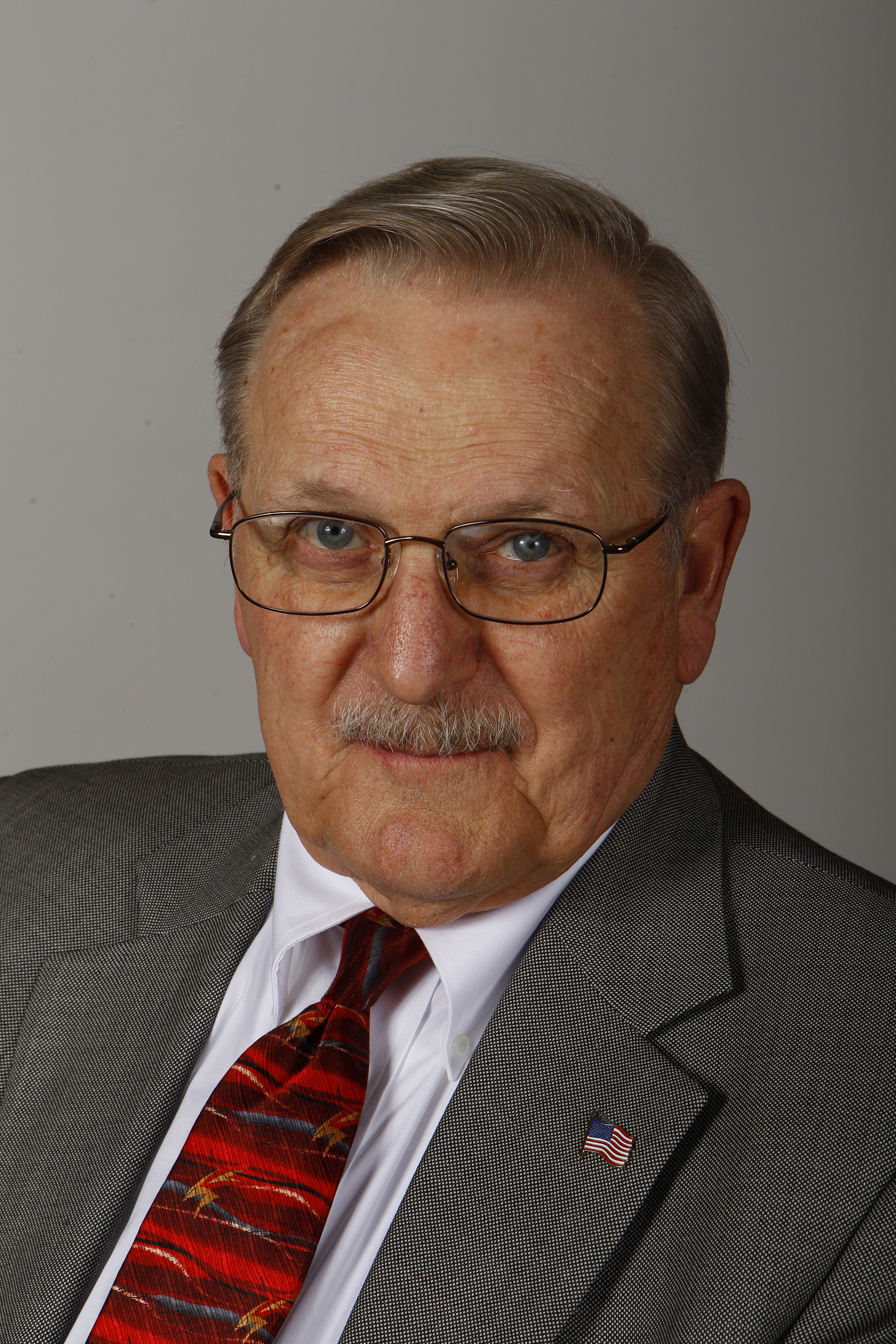

Member of the Iowa Senate from the 28th district
- In office January 13, 2003 – January 13, 2013
- Preceded by: Andy McKean
- Succeeded by: Michael Breitbach

Personal details
- Born: March 8, 1939 (age 87) Rockford, Illinois
- Party: Republican
- Spouse: Dottie
- Children: 3 children
- Occupation: Hospital Administrator/CEO
- Website: Seymour's website

James A. Seymour (born April 8, 1939) is the Iowa State Senator from the 28th District. A Republican, he has served in the Iowa Senate since 2003.

Seymour currently serves on several committees in the Iowa Senate - the Appropriations committee; and the Human Resources committee, the State Government committee; and the Veterans Affairs committee, where he is the ranking member. He also serves as ranking member of the Transportation, Infrastructure, and Capitals Appropriations Subcommittee.

Seymour was last re-elected in 2008 with 17,188 votes, running unopposed.

Iowa Senate
Preceded by Andy McKean	28th District; 2003 – 2013	Succeeded by Michael Breitbach
