= Dennis Guth =

American politician (born 1955)

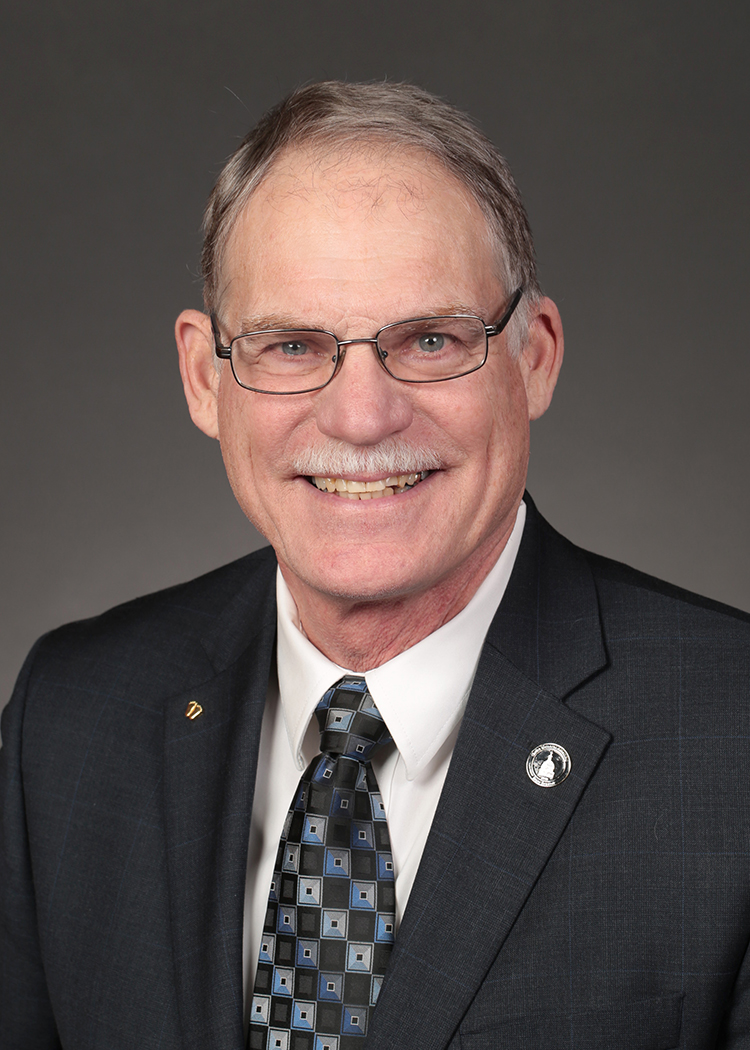

Member of the Iowa Senate from the 28th district
- Incumbent
- Assumed office January 14, 2013
- Preceded by: Jack Kibbie
- Constituency: District 28 - (2023-Present); District 4 - (2013-2023)

Personal details
- Born: 1955 (age 70–71) near Klemme, Iowa, U.S.
- Party: Republican
- Spouse: Margaret
- Children: 5
- Education: Iowa State University (BS)
- Occupation: Farmer

Dennis Guth (born 1955) is an American politician, currently the Iowa State Senator from the 28th District. A Republican, he has served in the Iowa Senate since winning an election against Bob Jennings in 2012, flipping the seat from Democratic to Republican.

Born in Klemme, Iowa Guth attended Klemme area Community School District. After graduating, Guth went go on to attend Iowa State University where he received a degree in Agricultural Mechanization. He first became involved in politics in 1994 when he was asked to be precinct chair the Ell Township Republican Committee, going on to serve 12 years as chair before going on to seek elected office. Guth currently resides in Klemme with his wife Margaret, they have five children, one of which they had adopted from Brazil.

As of February 2020, Guth serves on the following committees: Appropriations, Labor and Business Relations, and Local Government. He also serves on the Administration and Regulation Appropriations Subcommittee (Chair), as well as the Healthy and Well Kids in Iowa (HAWK-I) Board.

== Electoral history ==
Iowa Senate 4th District election, 2012
Party	Candidate	Votes	%
Republican	Dennis Guth	16,033	52.9%
Democratic	Bob Jennings	14,299	47.1%
Republican gain from Democratic			

Iowa Senate 4th District election, 2016
Party	Candidate	Votes	%
Republican	Dennis Guth	18,359	60.69%
Democratic	Susan Bangert	11,889	39.31%
Republican hold			

Iowa Senate
Preceded by Mike Klimesh	28th District; 2023 – present	Succeeded by Incumbent
Preceded by Jack Kibbie	4th District; 2013 – 2023	Succeeded by Tim Kraayenbrink
