= Dan Dawson (politician) =

American politician

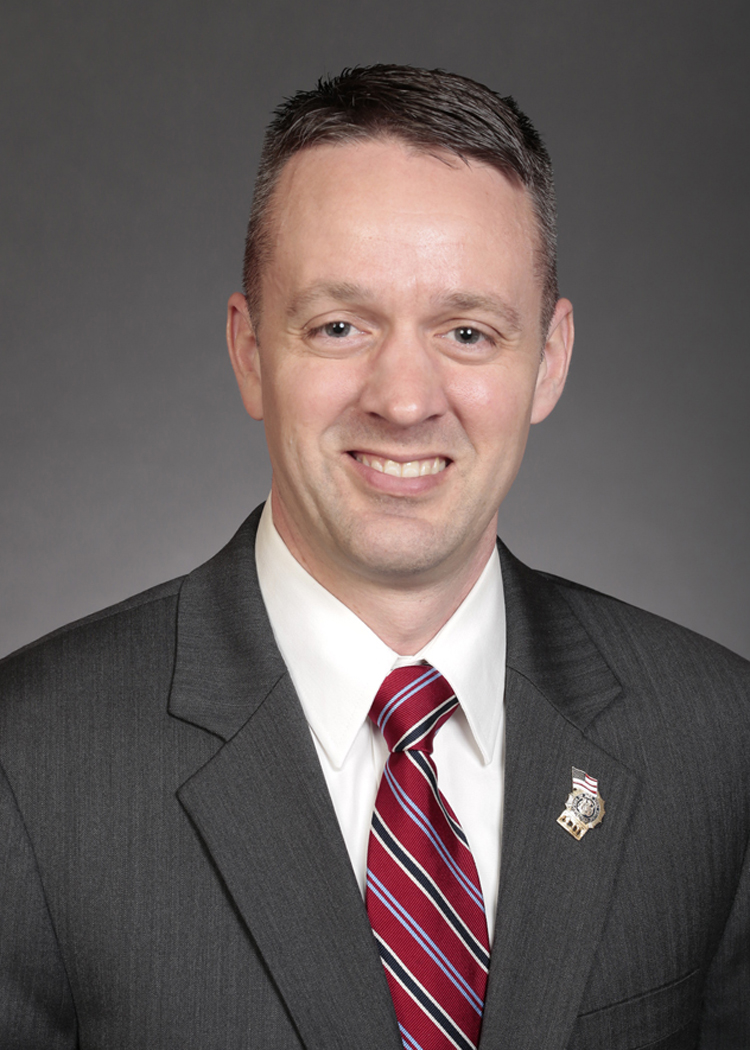

Member of the Iowa Senate from the 10th district
- Incumbent
- Assumed office January 14, 2017
- Preceded by: Michael Gronstal
- Constituency: 10th District - (2023-Present); 8th District - (2017-2023)

Personal details
- Born: 1978 (age 47–48) Omaha, Nebraska, U.S.
- Party: Republican
- Spouse: Chrystal
- Children: 2
- Education: Bellevue University (BS)

Dan Dawson (born 1978) is the Iowa State Senator from the 10th District. A Republican, he has served in the Iowa Senate since being elected in 2016. He is an investigation agent of the Iowa Division of Criminal Investigation and served in the United States Army in Iraq and Afghanistan. He was born in Omaha, Nebraska and currently resides in Council Bluffs, Iowa with his wife Chrystal and his two kids.

As of the 2025 legislative session, Dawson serves on the following committees: Ways & Means (Chair), Judiciary, and Veterans Affairs. He also serves on the Administrative Rules Review Joint Committee.

== Electoral history ==
Iowa Senate 8th District election, 2016
Party	Candidate	Votes	%
Republican	Dan Dawson	12,379	54.08%
Democratic	Michael Gronstal	10,510	44.92%
Republican gain from Democratic			

Iowa Senate
Preceded by Jake Chapman	10th District; 2023 –	Succeeded by Incumbent
Preceded by Michael Gronstal	8th District; 2017 – 2023	Succeeded by Mark Costello
