= Amy Sinclair =

American politician (born 1975)

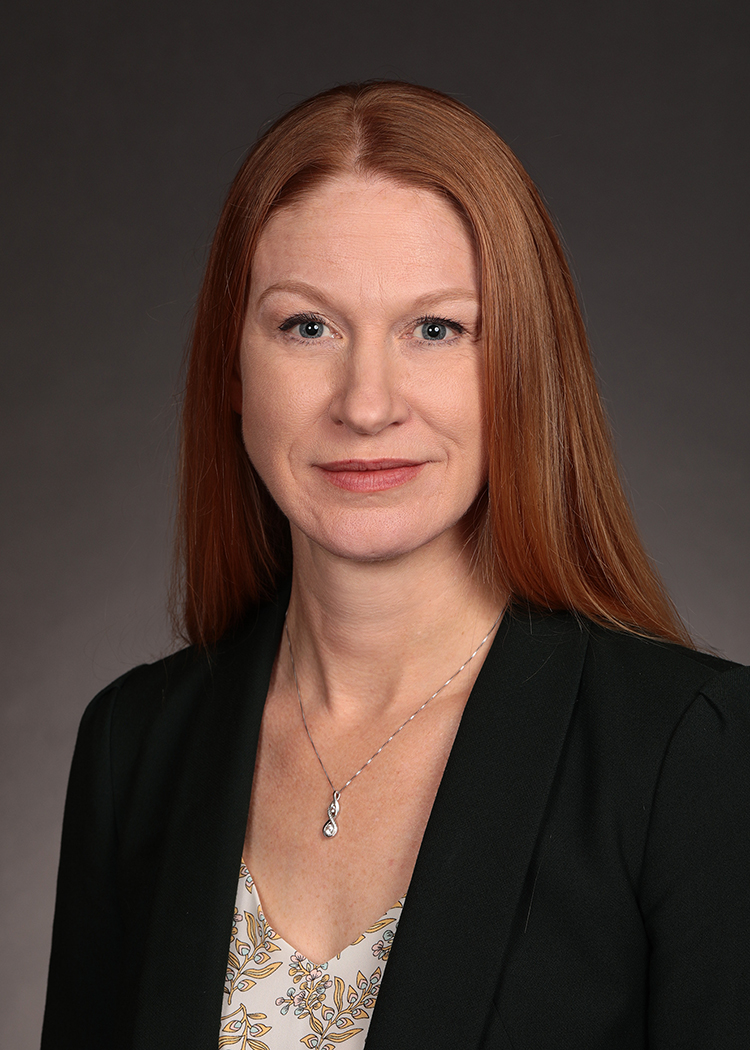
- Official portrait, 2021

Acting Lieutenant Governor of Iowa
- In office September 3, 2024 – December 16, 2024
- Governor: Kim Reynolds
- Preceded by: Adam Gregg
- Succeeded by: Chris Cournoyer

President of the Iowa Senate
- Incumbent
- Assumed office January 9, 2023
- Preceded by: Jake Chapman

Member of the Iowa Senate from the 12th district
- Incumbent
- Assumed office January 14, 2013
- Preceded by: Pam Jochum
- Constituency: 14th district (2013–2023); 12th district (2023–present)

Personal details
- Born: December 10, 1975 (age 50) Unionville, Missouri, U.S.
- Party: Republican
- Spouse: John Sinclair (divorced)
- Children: 3
- Education: Indian Hills Community College (AA)
- Website: State Senate website

Amy Beth Sinclair (née Jellison) (born December 10, 1975) is an American politician serving as the president of the Iowa Senate since 2023, having represented the 12th district since 2013. A member of the Republican Party, she briefly served as the acting lieutenant governor of Iowa in 2024 following the resignation of Adam Gregg.

== Career ==
Before her election to the Iowa Senate, she served two terms on the Wayne County Board of Supervisors.

=== Iowa Senate ===
In June 2016, Sinclair served on the following committees: Commerce, Education, and Judiciary, Government Oversight, and Rules and Administration. She also serves on the Legislative Council and the Violence in Iowa Study Committee.

In 2025, Sinclair served as Chair of the Rules and Administration Committee.

==== Senate leadership ====
In 2017, she served, along with Senators Michael Breitbach, Randy Feenstra, Dan Zumbach, as Assistant Majority Leader. Her son, Carter, was granted the opportunity to lead the chamber in reciting the Pledge of Allegiance on March 20, 2017.

She then served as Senate Majority Whip from March 15, 2018 until her accession to the Senate Presidency in 2023.

In November 2022, after Jake Chapman lost his bid for re-election, his position as President of the Senate was left vacant. Senator Jack Whitver nominated Sinclair for the position of President of the Senate. Sinclair was elected to that position by the Iowa Senate unanimously on January 9, 2023, and then was sworn in by Chief Justice Susan Christensen.

At the beginning of the 91st General Assembly, Senator Jason Schultz nominated Sinclair for President of the Senate and she was unanimously re-elected to that position on January 13, 2025. Iowa District Court Judge Dustria Relph swore her into office.

=== Lieutenant Governor ===
In September 2024, following the resignation of Adam Gregg as lieutenant governor of Iowa, Sinclair succeeded to the position of acting lieutenant governor and remained in her acting position until Governor Kim Reynolds appointed Chris Cournoyer in December 2024.

=== Hoover Award ===
In March 2023, Sinclair was awarded the Herbert Hoover Award.

== Personal life ==
She was born to Merlin Jellison (1932-2002) and Hilda "Rexine" Jellison (1935-2026) in 1975 in Unionville, Missouri. She has 5 siblings, 2 sisters and 3 brothers with one brother who died.

Sinclair was married to John Boyd Sinclair III, and later divorced, they have three sons together. She currently resides in Allerton, Iowa.

== Electoral history ==
Sinclair won her senate elections in 2012 with 58% of the vote, 2016 with 65% of the vote, 2020 with 78% of the vote and 2024 with 66% of the vote. She ran unopposed in her 2020 election.

2024 Iowa 12th District Senate Election Results
Party	Candidate	Votes	%	±%
Republican	Amy Sinclair	23,075	66.7%	
Democratic	Nancy Loew	9,682	27.98%	
Majority		23,075	66.7%	
Turnout		34,592	100%	

2020 Iowa 14th District Senate Election Results
Party	Candidate	Votes	%	±%
Republican	Amy Sinclair	24,623	78.68%	
Write-ins		6,667	21.3%	
Majority		24,623	78.68%	
Turnout		31,294	100%	

2016 Iowa 14th District Senate Election Results
Party	Candidate	Votes	%	±%
Republican	Amy Sinclair	19,482	65.88%	
Independent	Ruth Smith	6,755	22.84%	
Majority		19,482	65.88%	
Turnout		26,237	100%	
Republican gain from Independent		Swing		

2012 Iowa 14th District Senate Election Results
Party	Candidate	Votes	%	±%
Republican	Amy Sinclair	17,141	58.17%	
Democratic	Dick Schrad	11,011	37.36%	
Majority		17,141	58.17%	
Turnout		28,152	100%	

Political offices
Preceded by Jake Chapman	President of the Iowa Senate; 2023–present	Incumbent
Preceded by Adam Gregg	Lieutenant Governor of Iowa; Acting; 2024	Succeeded by Chris Cournoyer
