= Chris Brase =

American politician (born 1962)

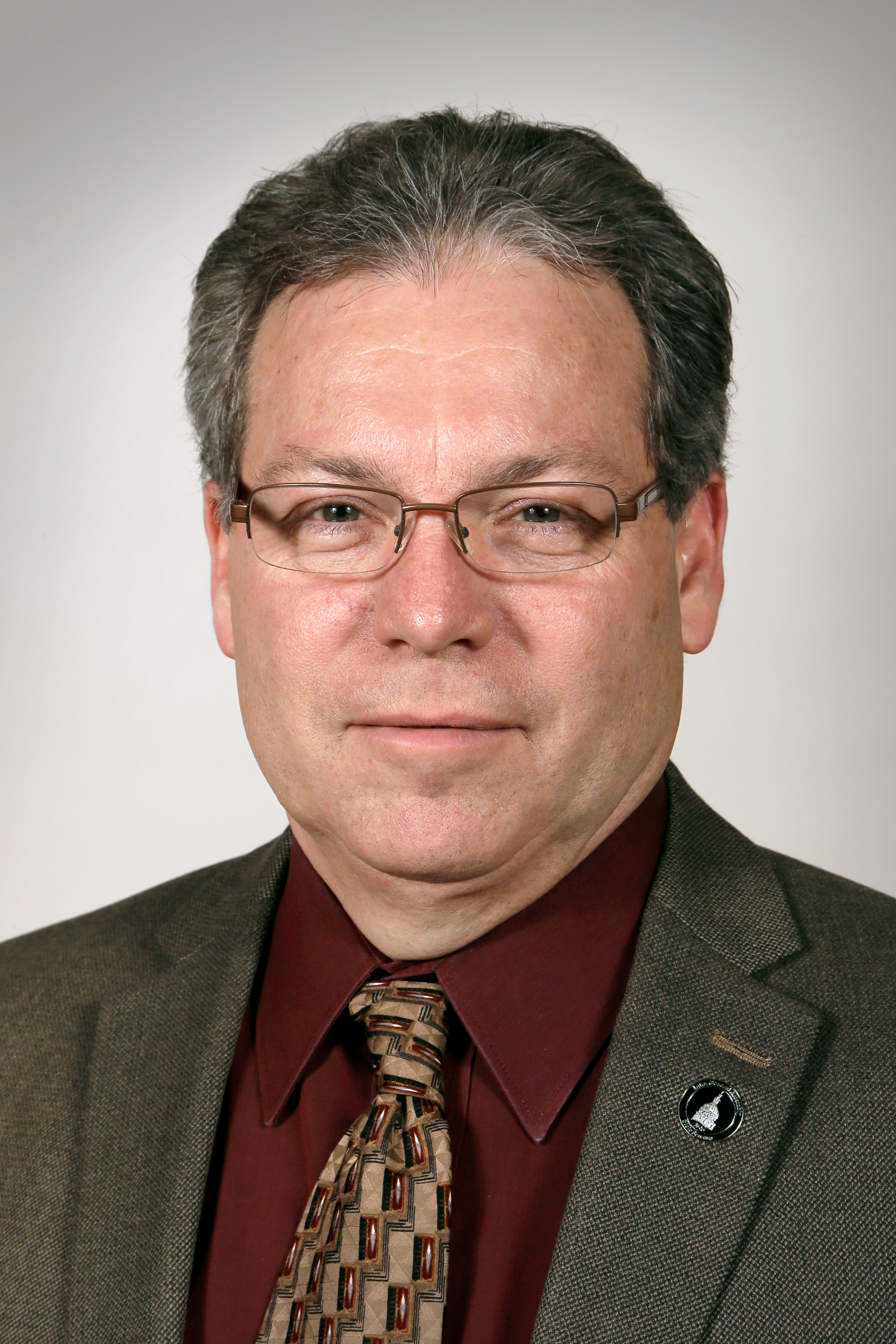

Member of the Iowa Senate from the 46th district
- In office January 14, 2013 – January 8, 2017
- Preceded by: Gene Fraise
- Succeeded by: Mark Lofgren

Personal details
- Born: 1962 (age 63–64) Donahue, Iowa
- Party: Democratic
- Spouse: Donna
- Children: Three
- Occupation: Firefighter
- Website: Brase's website

Chris Brase (born 1962) is a Democratic politician, who represented the 46th District in the Iowa Senate from 2013 until 2017. Brase served on the Agriculture, Labor and Business Relations, Local Government, Natural Resources and Environment, and Transportation Committees.

Before running for public office, Brase was a firefighter and paramedic for 21 years. Brase served as president and vice-president of the Muscatine Association of Firefighters Local 608.
