= Charles Schneider (politician) =

American politician (born 1973)

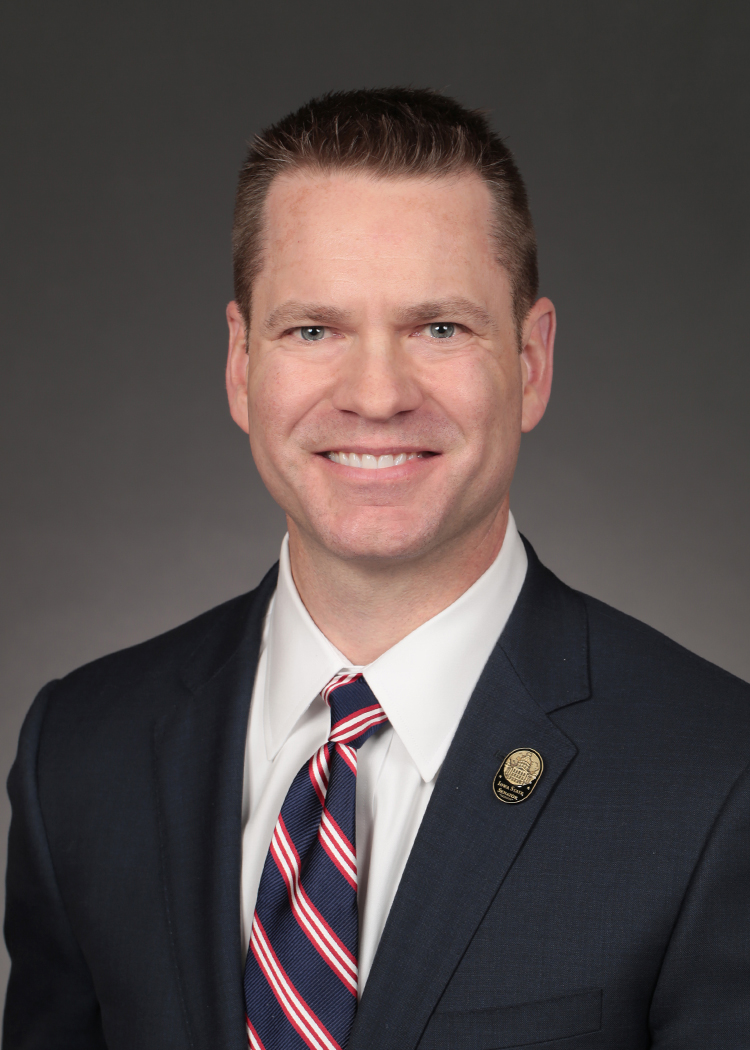

President of the Iowa Senate
- In office March 15, 2018 – January 11, 2021
- Preceded by: Jack Whitver
- Succeeded by: Jake Chapman

Member of the Iowa Senate from the 22nd district
- In office January 24, 2013 – January 11, 2021
- Preceded by: Pat Ward
- Succeeded by: Sarah Trone Garriott

Personal details
- Born: June 24, 1973 (age 53) Davenport, Iowa, U.S.
- Party: Republican
- Education: Creighton University (BA); University of Iowa (JD, MBA)

Charles Schneider (born June 24, 1973) is an American politician of the Republican Party, who served as a member of the Iowa Senate representing the state's 22nd district. He was the President of the Iowa Senate. He acted briefly as Majority Leader between Bill Dix's resignation and Jack Whitver's assumption of office.

Schneider previously served on the city council of West Des Moines, Iowa. He was first elected to the Iowa Senate in a 2012 special election to succeed Pat Ward, who died of cancer.

== Political campaigns ==
=== 2012 ===
In the 2012 Iowa Senate election, Republican Pat Ward died less than a month before the election and was re-elected to Iowa's 22nd Senate District even though she was deceased. A special election was held December 11, 2012, and Schneider received 56.5% of the vote, defeating Democrat Desmond Adams.

=== 2016 ===
In the 2016 Iowa Senate election, he ran for reelection in Iowa's 22nd Senate District and won with 55.9% of the vote, defeating Democrat Andrew Banes.

Political offices
Preceded by Jack Whitver	President of the Iowa Senate; 2018–2021	Succeeded by Jake Chapman
