= Jake Chapman (politician) =

American politician (born 1984)

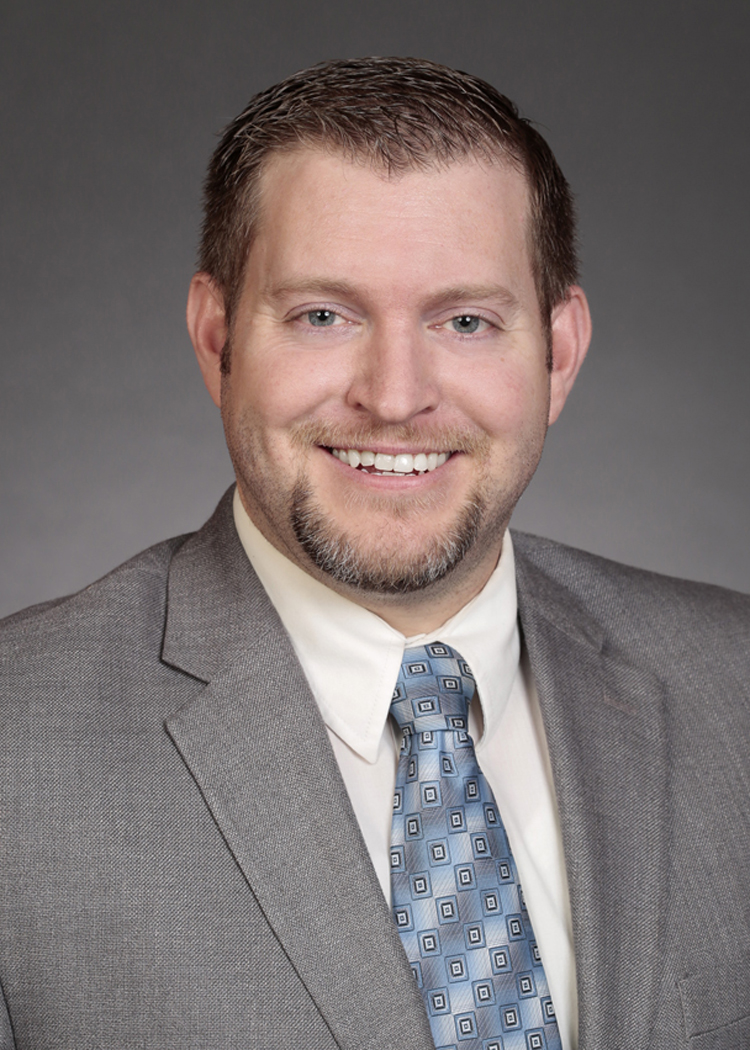

President of the Iowa Senate
- In office January 11, 2021 – January 9, 2023
- Preceded by: Charles Schneider
- Succeeded by: Amy Sinclair

Member of the Iowa Senate from the 10th district
- In office January 14, 2013 – January 9, 2023
- Preceded by: Jeff Danielson (redistricting)
- Succeeded by: Sarah Trone Garriott

Personal details
- Born: 1984 (age 41–42) Adel, Iowa, U.S.
- Party: Republican
- Spouse: Kimberly Chapman
- Children: 7 (2 step-children)
- Education: AIB College of Business (BBA)

Jake Chapman (born 1984) is an American politician and former Iowa State Senator from the 10th District. A Republican, he served in the Iowa Senate after being elected in 2012 to a seat that had no incumbent due to redistricting. At the age of 28, Chapman won the election and served as the youngest state senator in the 85th General Assembly. Chapman went on to become the chairman of the Commerce Committee, followed by the chairman of the Ways & Means Committee. In 2021 Chapman held the position of president of the Iowa Senate.

== Personal life ==
Born in Adel, Iowa, Chapman attended the now defunct AIB College of Business, where he earned a bachelor's degree in business administration.

He is an Eagle Scout.

He currently resides in Grimes. He previously directed the operations of his family business as the Chief Operating Officer. Jake currently is the president and CEO of Intralux Consulting - a political and corporate consulting firm that also specializes in advertising.

== Iowa Senate ==
On January 16, 2020, Chapman, through a Senate subcommittee, advanced an amendment saying that the Iowa Constitution recognizes the sanctity of life.

Chapman opposed gun legislation that would have allowed authorities to seize firearms from someone without receiving a court appearance.

In January 2022, Chapman served on the following committees: Commerce and Rules and Administration as well as the Legislative Council, Service Committee and Administration Committee.

On November 8, 2022, Chapman was defeated in the general election by State Senator Sarah Trone Garriott.

== Electoral history ==
2012 Iowa 10th District Senate General Election
Party	Candidate	Votes	%	±%
Republican	Jake Chapman	22,594	68.18%	
	Write-in, Over and under votes	10,541	31.81%	
Turnout		33,135	100%	

2016 Iowa 10th District Senate General Election
Party	Candidate	Votes	%	±%
Republican	Jake Chapman	20,053	61.53%	
Democratic	Matt Paladino	10,006	30.70%	
	Write-in, Over and under votes	2,531	7.76%	
Republican hold				
Turnout		32,950	100%	

Iowa Senate 10th District election, 2020
Party	Candidate	Votes	%
Republican	Jake Chapman	24,538	62.5%
Democratic	Warren Varley	14,704	37.4%
Republican hold			

Iowa Senate 22nd District election, 2022
Party	Candidate	Votes	%
Democratic	Sarah Trone Garriott	15,093	51.4%
Republican	Jake Chapman	14,218	48.5%
Democratic gain from Republican			

Political offices
Preceded by Charles Schneider	President of the Iowa Senate; 2021–2023	Succeeded by Amy Sinclair
