= Mark Segebart =

American politician

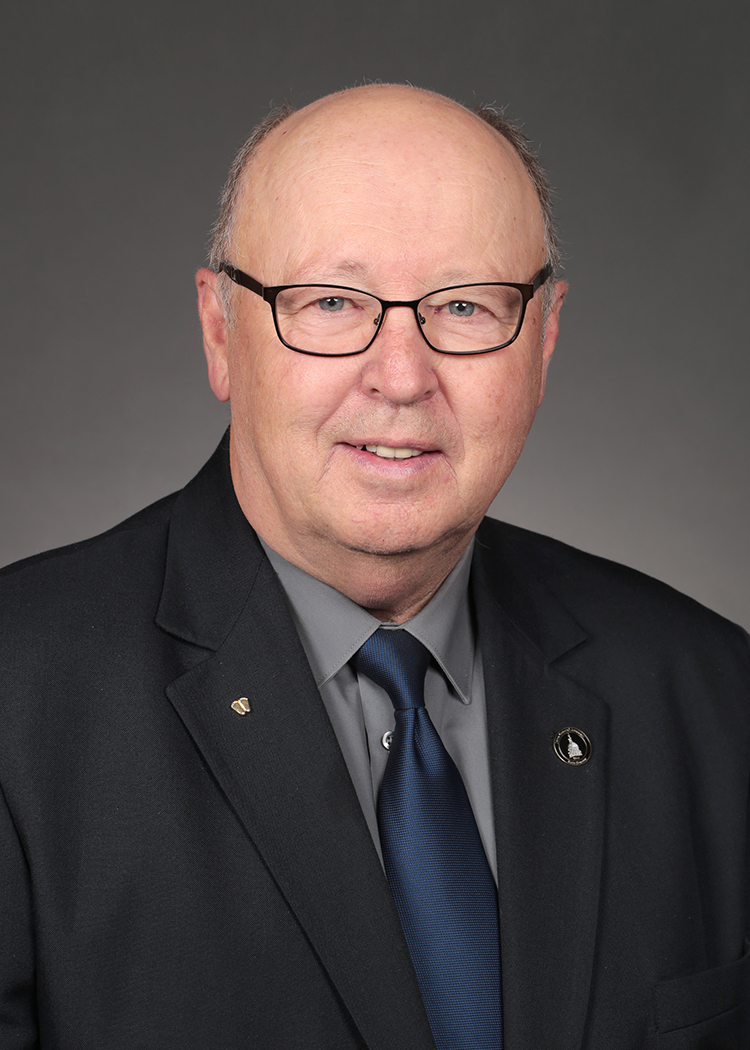

Member of the Iowa Senate from the 6th district
- In office January 14, 2013 – January 11, 2021
- Preceded by: Merlin Bartz
- Succeeded by: Craig Williams

Personal details
- Born: August 1950 (age 76) Crawford County, Iowa, U.S.
- Party: Republican
- Spouse: Catherine
- Children: 2
- Education: Iowa State University
- Occupation: Politician, Farmer

Mark Segebart (born August 1950) is an American politician. He currently serves as the Iowa State Senator from the 6th District. A Republican, he has served in the Iowa Senate since winning election in 2012. Prior to running for state Senate, Segebart spent 16 years as a Crawford County Supervisor.

As of February 2020, Segebart served on the following committees: Human Resources (Vice Chair), Local Government, and Natural Resources and Environment. He also served on the Health Policy Oversight Committee as well as the Child Care Advisory Committee, and the Commission on Aging.

In July 2020, Segabart announced that he would be retiring from the State Senate at the end of his term in January 2021.

== Electoral history ==
Iowa Senate 6th District election, 2012
Party	Candidate	Votes	%
Republican	Mark Segebart	16,023	57.0%
Democratic	Mary C. Burner	12,058	42.9%
Republican hold			

Iowa Senate 6th District election, 2016
Party	Candidate	Votes	%
Republican	Mark Segebart	20,223	83.1%
Libertarian	Nick Serianni	4,044	16.6%
Republican hold			

== Personal ==
He currently resides in Vail, Iowa with his wife Catherine. The two have been advocates for children their entire lives, with Mark previously serving as a bus driver and Catherine serving as a teacher. They have two children and two grandchildren.
