= Rich Taylor (politician) =

American politician

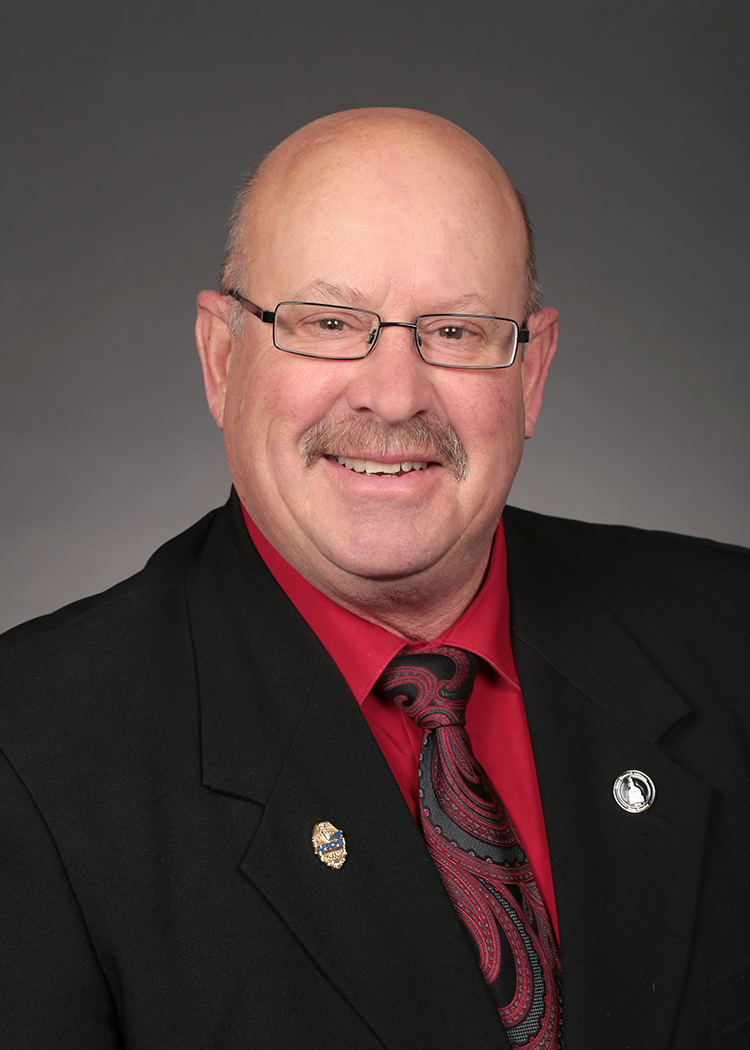

Member of the Iowa Senate from the 42nd district
- In office January 14, 2013 – January 2021
- Preceded by: Shawn Hamerlinck
- Succeeded by: Jeff Reichman

Personal details
- Born: 1954 (age 71–72) Mount Union, Iowa, U.S.
- Party: Democratic
- Spouse: Annette
- Children: 2

Military service
- Branch/service: United States Army
- Unit: Iowa National Guard

Rich Taylor (born 1954) is an American politician who served as a member of the Iowa Senate for the 42nd district from 2013 to 2021. A Democrat, he also served as assistant Democratic leader.

== Early life ==
Born and raised in Mount Union, Iowa he graduated high school before joining Iowa National Guard.

== Career ==
After retiring from the National Guard, Taylor became an electrician. He worked for the Iowa State Penitentiary in Fort Madison for 26 years, where he was in charge of repairing and operating the heating, ventilation, air-conditioning and refrigeration systems.

Taylor assumed office 2013, flipping the district after the previous incumbent Shawn Hamerlinck lost renomination due to a sexual harassment lawsuit filed against him.

Taylor served as the ranking member of the Senate Veterans Affairs Committee. He was also a member of the Interstate Compact for Adult Offender Supervision State Council.

== Personal life ==
He resides near Mount Pleasant, Iowa with his wife Annette and their two children.

== Electoral history ==
Iowa Senate 42nd District election, 2012
| Party | Candidate | Votes | % |
|---|---|---|---|
| Democratic | Rich Taylor | 15,058 | 50.6% |
| Republican | Larry Kruse | 13,281 | 44.7% |
| Independent | Michael Garmoe | 1,396 | 4.7%% |
| Democratic gain from Republican | | | |

Iowa Senate 42nd District election, 2016
| Party | Candidate | Votes | % |
|---|---|---|---|
| Democratic | Rich Taylor | 13,434 | 50.31% |
| Republican | Danny Graber | 13,266 | 49.69% |
| Democratic hold | | | |

Iowa Senate, District 42 General Election, 2020
| Party | Candidate | Votes | % |
|---|---|---|---|
| Republican | Jeff Reichman | 16,766 | 59.9 |
| Democratic | Rich Taylor (incumbent) | 11,228 | 40.1 |
| Total votes | | 27,994 | 100.0 |
| Republican gain from Democratic | | | |
