= Iowa's 22nd Senate district =

American legislative district

Iowa's 22nd State Senate district
Senator
Matt Blake; D

The 22nd District of the Iowa Senate is located in southern Iowa, and is currently composed of part of Polk County.

== Current elected officials ==
Matt Blake is the senator currently representing the 22nd District.

The area of the 22nd District contains two Iowa House of Representatives districts:

- The 43rd District (represented by Jennifer Konfrst)
- The 44th District (represented by Kenan Judge)

The district is also located in Iowa's 3rd congressional district, which is represented by Zach Nunn.

== Past senators ==
The district has previously been represented by:

- Charles Balloun, 1965–1967
- Merlin Hulse, 1983–1984
- Beverly Hannon, 1985–1992
- Patrick Deluhery, 1993–2002
- Larry McKibben, 2003–2008
- Steve Sodders, 2009–2012
- Charles Schneider, 2013–2021
- Sarah Trone Garriott, 2021–2023
- Brad Zaun, 2023–2025
- Matt Blake, 2025–present

== See also ==
- Iowa General Assembly
- Iowa Senate
