= Michael Breitbach =

American politician

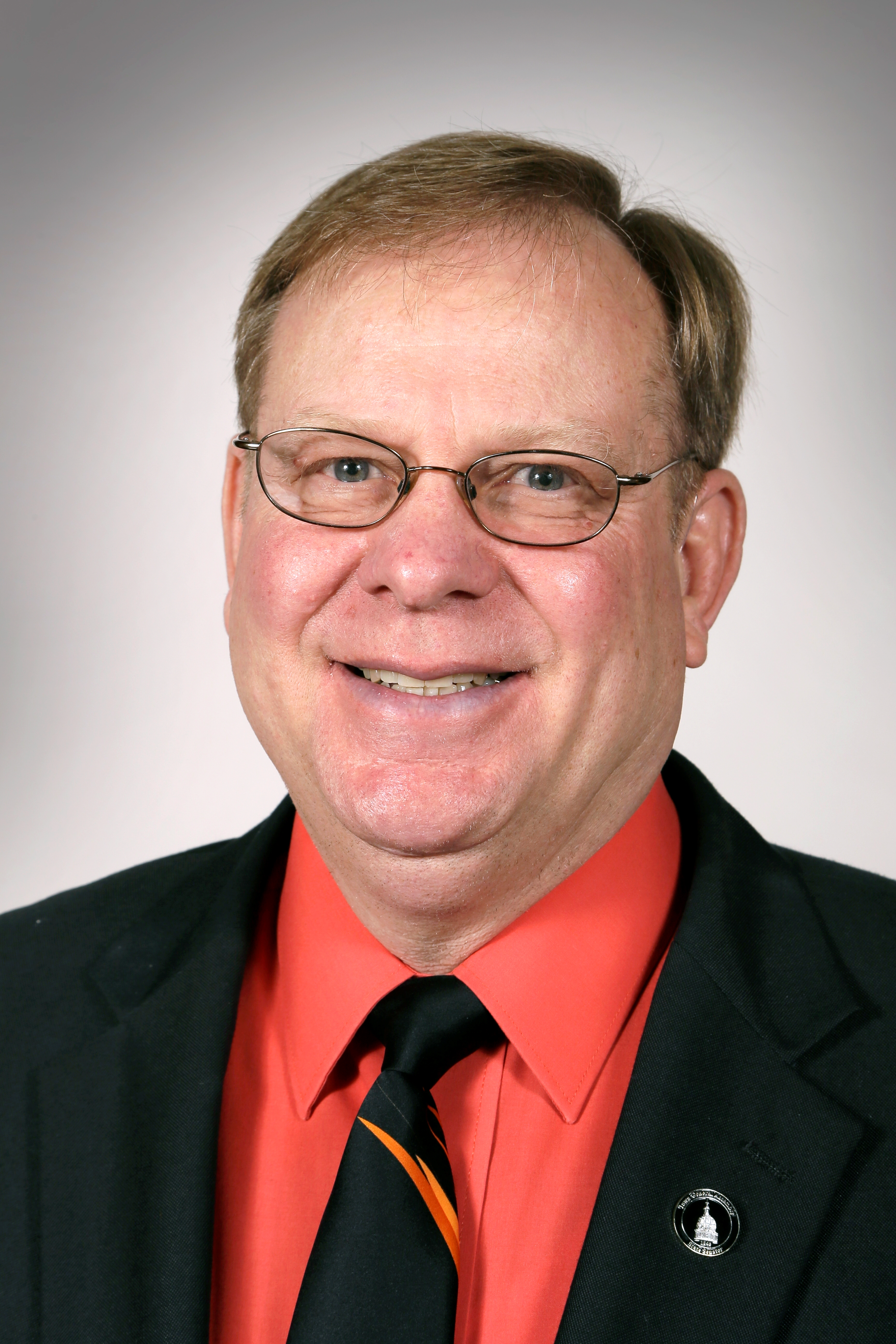

Member of the Iowa Senate from the 28th district
- In office January 14, 2013 – January 11, 2021
- Preceded by: James Seymour
- Succeeded by: Mike Klimesh

Personal details
- Born: 1956 (age 69–70) Manchester, Iowa, U.S.
- Party: Republican
- Spouse: Theresa
- Education: Loras College

Michael Breitbach is an American politician who served as a member of the Iowa Senate for the 28th district from 2013 to 2021. Breitbach was born in Manchester, Iowa and he resides in Strawberry Point, Iowa.

Breitbach served on the following committees in the Iowa Senate: Commerce, Natural Resources and Environment, and Transportation. He also serves on the Commission on Tobacco Use Prevention and Control, and on the following interim study committees: Cannabidiol Implementation Study Committee, and Emergency Medical Services Study Committee.

== Electoral history ==
Iowa Senate 28th District election, 2012
Party	Candidate	Votes	%
Republican	Michael Breitbach	14,868	50.0%
Democratic	John Beard	14,851	49.9%
Nonpartisan	Write-in	21	0.1%
Republican hold			
