= Iowa's 38th Senate district =

American legislative district

Senate District 38
- Type: District of the Upper House
- Location: Eastern Iowa
- Senator: Dave Sires (R)
- Parent organization: Iowa General Assembly

The 38th District of the Iowa Senate is located in eastern Iowa, and is currently composed of part of Black Hawk, Benton, Tama Counties.

== Current elected officials ==
Dave Sires is the senator currently representing the 38th District.

The area of the 38th District contains two Iowa House of Representatives districts:

- The 75th District (represented by Thomas Gerhold)
- The 76th District (represented by David Maxwell)

The district is also located in Iowa's 1st congressional district, which is represented by Mariannette Miller-Meeks.

== Past senators ==
The district has previously been represented by:

- Emil Husak, 1983–1992
- O. Gene Maddox, 1993–2002
- Neal Schuerer, 2003–2004
- Tom Rielly, 2005–2012
- Tim Kapucian, 2013–2021
- Dawn Driscoll, 2021–2025
- Dave Sires, 2025–present

== Recent election results from statewide races ==
| Year | Office | Results |
|---|---|---|
| 2008 | President | Obama 55–43% |
| 2012 | President | Obama 53–47% |
| 2016 | President | Trump 48–45% |
| 2016 | Senate | Grassley 59–37% |
| 2018 | Governor | Hubbell 51–47% |
| 2018 | Attorney General | Miller 78–22% |
| 2018 | Secretary of State | Pate 50–48% |
| 2018 | Treasurer | Fitzgerald 56–41% |
| 2018 | Auditor | Sand 55–43% |
| 2020 | President | Biden 49.1–48.8% |
| 2020 | Senate | Ernst 49–48% |
| 2022 | Senate | Grassley 52–47% |
| 2022 | Governor | Reynolds 55–42% |
| 2022 | Attorney General | Miller 54–46% |
| 2022 | Secretary of State | Pate 58–42% |
| 2022 | Treasurer | Fitzgerald 51–49% |
| 2022 | Auditor | Sand 55–45% |
| 2024 | President | Trump 52–47% |

== See also ==
- Iowa General Assembly
- Iowa Senate
