= Dave Sires =

American politician

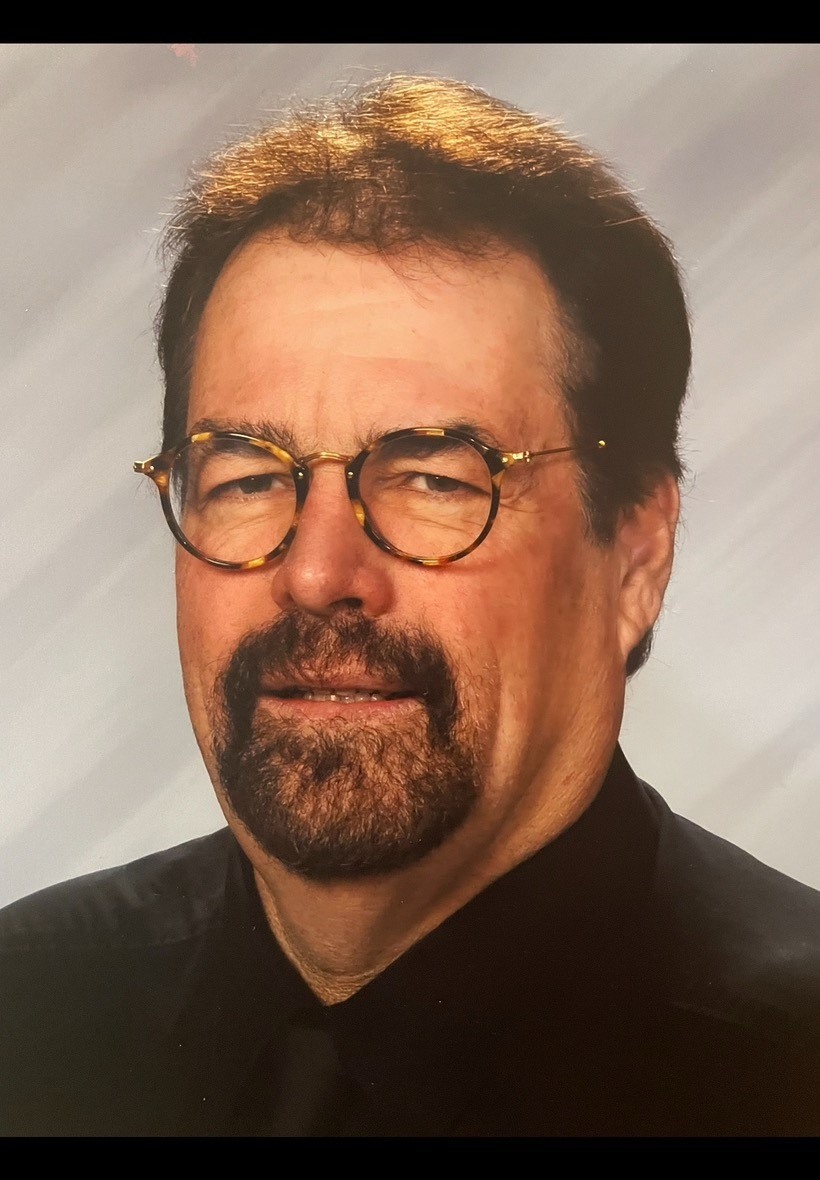

Member of the Iowa Senate from the 38th district
- Incumbent
- Assumed office January 2, 2025
- Preceded by: Dawn Driscoll

Personal details
- Born: Cedar Falls, Iowa
- Party: Republican
- Website: www.siresforsenate.com

Dave Sires is an American politician. He was elected to the Iowa Senate in the 2024 Iowa Senate election.

He was a member of Cedar Falls City Council.

2024 Iowa Senate election
Party	Candidate	Votes	%	±%
Republican	Dave Sires	17,232	50.6%	
Democratic	[[Eric Giddens]]	16,846	49.4%	
