= 2024 Iowa Senate election =

2024 Iowa Senate Election
- November 5, 2024

25 of the 50 seats in the Iowa Senate 26 seats needed for a majority
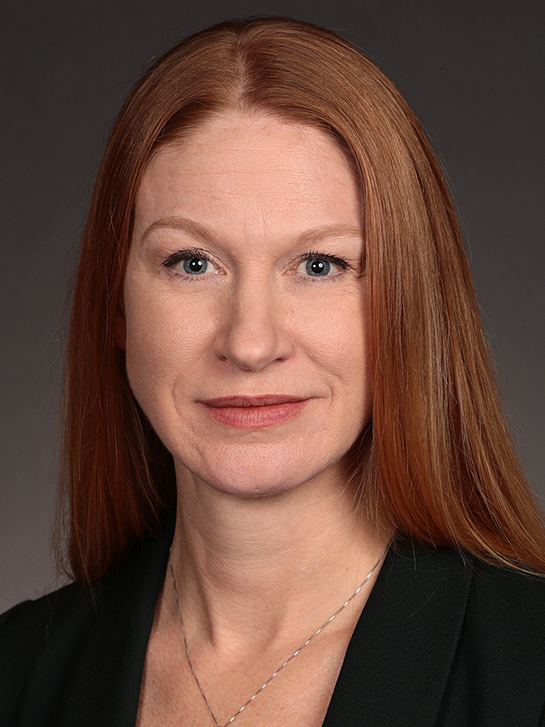

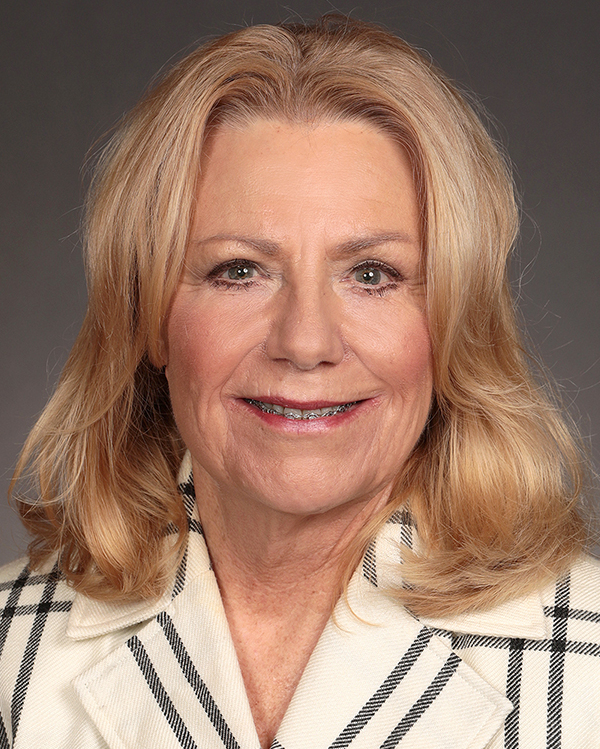
	Majority party	Minority party
Leader	Amy Sinclair	Pam Jochum (retired)
Party	Republican	Democratic
Leader since	January 9, 2023	June 7, 2023
Leader's seat	12th district	36th district
Last election	22 seats, 54.05%	12 seats, 43.98%
Seats before	34	16
Seats won	19	6
Seats after	35	15
Seat change	▲1	▼1
Popular vote	465,937	289,250
Percentage	59.58%	36.98%
- Results: Republican gain Democratic gain Republican hold Democratic hold No election
President of the Senate before election
Amy Sinclair
Republican
Elected President of the Senate
Amy Sinclair
Republican

The 2024 Iowa Senate election was held on November 5, 2024, alongside the 2024 United States elections.

== Background ==
Primaries were held on June 4, 2024.

== Retirements ==
=== Democrats ===
1. District 36: Pam Jochum retired.
2. District 40: Todd Taylor retired to run for Linn County Auditor.

=== Republicans ===
1. District 26: Jeff Edler retired.

== Resignation ==
One seat was left vacant on the day of the general election due to resignation in 2024.

=== Republicans ===
1. District 30: Waylon Brown resigned July 10.

== Predictions ==
Source	Ranking	As of
CNalysis	Solid R	March 26, 2024

== Closest races ==
Seats where the margin of victory was under 5%:

1. State Senate district 14, 0.07%
2. State Senate district 20, 0.14% gain
3. State Senate district 36, 1.04%
4. State Senate district 38, 1.13% gain
5. State Senate district 22, 4.91% gain

== Detailed results ==
=== District 2 ===
2nd District Republican primary details

Republican Primary, 2nd District
Party	Candidate	Votes	%
Republican	Jeff Taylor (incumbent)	6,347	99.40
Write-in		38	0.60
Total votes		6,385	100.00

2024 Iowa Senate election, 2nd District
Party	Candidate	Votes	%
Republican	Jeff Taylor (incumbent)	27,438	99.11
Write-in		245	0.89
Total votes		27,683	100.0
Republican hold			

=== District 4 ===
4th District Republican primary details

Republican Primary, 4th District
Party	Candidate	Votes	%
Republican	Tim Kraayenbrink (incumbent)	4,064	98.59
Write-in		58	1.41
Total votes		4,122	100.00

2024 Iowa Senate election, 4th District
Party	Candidate	Votes	%
Republican	Tim Kraayenbrink (incumbent)	23,727	97.81
Write-in		531	2.19
Total votes		24,258	100.0
Republican hold			

=== District 6 ===
6th District Libertarian primary details

Libertarian Primary, 50th District
Party	Candidate	Votes	%
Libertarian	David M. Davis	23	95.83
Write-in		1	4.17
Total votes		24	100.00

6th District Republican primary details

Republican Primary, 6th District
Party	Candidate	Votes	%
Republican	Jason Schultz (incumbent)	3,696	97.37
Write-in		100	2.63
Total votes		3,796	100.00

2024 Iowa Senate election, 6th District
Party	Candidate	Votes	%
Republican	Jason Schultz (incumbent)	23,108	80.98
Libertarian	David M. Davis	5,337	18.70
Write-in		90	0.32
Total votes		28,535	100.0
Republican hold			

=== District 8 ===
8th District Democratic primary details

Democratic Primary, 8th District
Party	Candidate	Votes	%
Democratic	Ryan Lee Roenfeld	573	99.13
Write-in		5	0.87
Total votes		578	100.00

8th District Republican primary details

Republican Primary, 8th District
Party	Candidate	Votes	%
Republican	Mark Costello (incumbent)	3,838	97.37
Write-in		73	1.87
Total votes		3,911	100.00

2024 Iowa Senate election, 8th District
Party	Candidate	Votes	%
Republican	Mark Costello (incumbent)	25,069	70.47
Democratic	Ryan Lee Roenfeld	10,432	29.32
Write-in		73	0.21
Total votes		35,574	100.0
Republican hold			

=== District 10 ===
10th District Democratic primary details

Democratic Primary, 10th District
Party	Candidate	Votes	%
Democratic	Steve Gorman	483	99.38
Write-in		3	0.62
Total votes		486	100.00

10th District Republican primary details

Republican Primary, 10th District
Party	Candidate	Votes	%
Republican	Dan Dawson (incumbent)	1,039	98.86
Write-in		12	1.14
Total votes		1,051	100.00

2024 Iowa Senate election, 10th District
Party	Candidate	Votes	%
Republican	Dan Dawson (incumbent)	13,840	56.01
Democratic	Steve Gorman	10,842	43.88
Write-in		27	0.11
Total votes		24,709	100.0
Republican hold			

=== District 12 ===
12th District Democratic primary details

Democratic Primary, 12th District
Party	Candidate	Votes	%
Democratic	Nicole Loew	1,076	99.81
Write-in		2	0.19
Total votes		1,078	100.00

12th District Republican primary details

Republican Primary, 12th District
Party	Candidate	Votes	%
Republican	Amy Sinclair (incumbent)	5,044	98.46
Write-in		79	1.54
Total votes		5,123	100.00

2024 Iowa Senate election, 12th District
Party	Candidate	Votes	%
Republican	Amy Sinclair (incumbent)	23,075	70.35
Democratic	Nicole Loew	9,682	29.52
Write-in		43	0.13
Total votes		32,800	100.0
Republican hold			

=== District 14 ===
14th District Democratic primary details

Democratic Primary, 14th District
Party	Candidate	Votes	%
Democratic	Sarah Trone Garriott (incumbent)	1,485	99.66
Write-in		5	0.34
Total votes		1,490	100.00

14th District Republican primary details

Republican Primary, 14th District
Party	Candidate	Votes	%
Republican	Mark A. Hanson	1,485	98.54
Write-in		22	1.46
Total votes		1,507	100.00

2024 Iowa Senate election, 14th District
Party	Candidate	Votes	%
Democratic	Sarah Trone Garriott (incumbent)	20,467	49.96
Republican	Mark A. Hanson	20,438	49.89
Write-in		59	0.14
Total votes		40,964	100.0
Democratic hold			

=== District 16 ===
16th District Democratic primary details

Democratic Primary, 16th District
Party	Candidate	Votes	%
Democratic	Claire Celsi (incumbent)	2,466	80.54
Democratic	Julie Lasche Brown	595	19.43
Write-in		1	0.03
Total votes		3,062	100.00

2024 Iowa Senate election, 16th District
Party	Candidate	Votes	%
Democratic	Claire Celsi (incumbent)	21,557	69.46
Libertarian	Joshua Smith	9,184	29.59
Write-in		296	0.95
Total votes		31,037	100.0
Democratic hold			

=== District 18 ===
18th District Democratic primary details

Democratic Primary, 18th District
Party	Candidate	Votes	%
Democratic	Janet Petersen (incumbent)	4,087	99.44
Write-in		23	0.56
Total votes		4,110	100.00

2024 Iowa Senate election, 18th District
Party	Candidate	Votes	%
Democratic	Janet Petersen (incumbent)	25,564	97.09
Write-in		766	2.91
Total votes		26,330	100.0
Democratic hold			

=== District 20 ===
20th District Democratic primary details

Democratic Primary, 20th District
Party	Candidate	Votes	%
Democratic	Nate Boulton (incumbent)	1,348	99.70
Write-in		4	0.30
Total votes		1,352	100.00

20th District Republican primary details

Republican Primary, 20th District
Party	Candidate	Votes	%
Republican	Mike Pike	673	98.12
Write-in		13	1.88
Total votes		690	100.00

2024 Iowa Senate election, 20th District
Party	Candidate	Votes	%
Republican	Mike Pike	15,644	49.96
Democratic	Nate Boulton (incumbent)	15,600	49.82
Write-in		66	0.21
Total votes		31,310	100.0
Republican gain from Democratic			

=== District 22 ===
22nd District Democratic primary details

Democratic Primary, 22nd District
Party	Candidate	Votes	%
Democratic	Matt Blake	2,689	99.70
Write-in		8	0.30
Total votes		2,697	100.00

22nd District Republican primary details

Republican Primary, 22nd District
Party	Candidate	Votes	%
Republican	Brad Zaun	1,229	98.32
Write-in		21	1.68
Total votes		1,250	100.00

2024 Iowa Senate election, 22nd District
Party	Candidate	Votes	%
Democratic	Matt Blake	19,128	52.37
Republican	Brad Zaun (incumbent)	17,336	47.46
Write-in		64	0.18
Total votes		36,528	100.0
Democratic gain from Republican			

=== District 24 ===
24th District Democratic primary details

Democratic Primary, 24th District
Party	Candidate	Votes	%
Democratic	Margaret Liston	885	99.77
Write-in		2	0.23
Total votes		887	100.00

24th District Republican primary details

Republican Primary, 24th District
Party	Candidate	Votes	%
Republican	Jesse Green (incumbent)	1,709	98.84
Write-in		20	1.16
Total votes		1,729	100.00

2024 Iowa Senate election, 24th District
Party	Candidate	Votes	%
Republican	Jesse Green (incumbent)	21,004	62.45
Democratic	Margaret Liston	12,580	37.40
Write-in		50	0.15
Total votes		33,634	100.0
Republican hold			

=== District 26 ===
26th District Democratic primary details

Democratic Primary, 26th District
Party	Candidate	Votes	%
Democratic	Mike Wolfe	631	99.68
Write-in		2	0.32
Total votes		633	100.00

26th District Republican primary details

Republican Primary, 26th District
Party	Candidate	Votes	%
Republican	Kara Warme	1,611	53.63
Republican	Gannon Hendrick	1,390	46.27
Write-in		3	0.10
Total votes		3,004	100.00

2024 Iowa Senate election, 26th District
Party	Candidate	Votes	%
Republican	Kara Warme	17,967	59.62
Democratic	Mike Wolfe	12,121	40.22
Write-in		48	0.16
Total votes		30,136	100.0
Republican hold			

=== District 28 ===
28th District Democratic primary details

Democratic Primary, 28th District
Party	Candidate	Votes	%
Democratic	Cynthia Oppedal Paschen	470	98.74
Write-in		6	1.26
Total votes		476	100.00

28th District Republican primary details

Republican Primary, 28th District
Party	Candidate	Votes	%
Republican	Dennis Guth	3,475	98.89
Write-in		39	1.11
Total votes		3,514	100.00

2024 Iowa Senate election, 28th District
Party	Candidate	Votes	%
Republican	Dennis Guth (Incumbent)	21,185	69.36
Democratic	Cynthia Oppedal Paschen	9,302	30.45
Write-in		58	0.19
Total votes		30,545	100.0
Republican hold			

=== District 30 ===
30th District Democratic primary details

Democratic Primary, 30th District
Party	Candidate	Votes	%
Democratic	Richard Lorence	937	98.22
Write-in		17	1.78
Total votes		954	100.00

30th District Republican primary details

Republican Primary, 30th District
Party	Candidate	Votes	%
Republican	Waylon Brown (incumbent)	2,547	52.78
Republican	Doug Campbell	2,273	47.10
Write-in		6	0.12
Total votes		4,826	100.00

2024 Iowa Senate election, 30th District
Party	Candidate	Votes	%
Republican	Doug Campbell	20,272	61.26
Democratic	Richard Lorence	12,762	38.57
Write-in		58	0.18
Total votes		33,092	100.0
Republican hold			

=== District 32 ===
34th District Democratic primary details

No candidate filed for election. Brian Bruening was chosen as the nominee as a write-in candidate.

32nd District Republican primary details

Republican Primary, 32nd District
Party	Candidate	Votes	%
Republican	Mike Klimesh (incumbent)	3,664	99.03
Write-in		26	0.97
Total votes		2,690	100.00

2024 Iowa Senate election, 32nd District
Party	Candidate	Votes	%
Republican	Mike Klimesh (Incumbent)	22,097	64.60
Democratic	Brian Bruening	12,080	35.32
Write-in		27	0.08
Total votes		34,204	100.0
Republican hold			

=== District 34 ===
34th District Democratic primary details

No candidate filed for election. Joe Hegland was chosen as the nominee as a write-in candidate.

34th District Republican primary details

Republican Primary, 34th District
Party	Candidate	Votes	%
Republican	Dan Zumbach (incumbent)	1,656	98.87
Write-in		19	1.13
Total votes		1,675	100.00

2024 Iowa Senate election, 34th District
Party	Candidate	Votes	%
Republican	Dan Zumbach (Incumbent)	21,962	66.68
Democratic	Joe Hegland	10,937	33.21
Write-in		36	0.11
Total votes		32,935	100.0
Republican hold			

=== District 36 ===
36th District Democratic primary details

Democratic Primary, 36th District
Party	Candidate	Votes	%
Democratic	Thomas Townsend	1,164	99.57
Write-in		5	0.43
Total votes		1,169	100.00

36th District Republican primary details

Republican Primary, 36th District
Party	Candidate	Votes	%
Republican	Nicholas Molo	1,232	98.80
Write-in		15	1.20
Total votes		1,247	100.00

2024 Iowa Senate election, 36th District
Party	Candidate	Votes	%
Democratic	Thomas Townsend	15,274	50.45
Republican	Nicholas Molo	14,958	49.41
Write-in		43	0.14
Total votes		30,275	100.0
Democratic hold			

=== District 38 ===
38th District Democratic primary details

Democratic Primary, 38th District
Party	Candidate	Votes	%
Democratic	Eric Giddens (incumbent)	1,388	99.78
Write-in		3	0.22
Total votes		1,391	100.00

38th District Republican primary details

Republican Primary, 38th District
Party	Candidate	Votes	%
Republican	Dave Sires	1,365	58.94
Republican	Steve Schmitt	622	26.86
Republican	James McCullagh	322	13.90
Write-in		7	0.30
Total votes		2,316	100.00

2024 Iowa Senate election, 38th District
Party	Candidate	Votes	%
Republican	Dave Sires	17,232	50.51
Democratic	Eric Giddens (Incumbent)	16,846	49.38
Write-in		38	0.11
Total votes		34,116	100.0
Republican gain from Democratic			

=== District 40 ===
40th District Democratic primary details

Democratic Primary, 40th District
Party	Candidate	Votes	%
Democratic	Art Staed (incumbent)	766	99.09
Write-in		7	0.91
Total votes		773	100.00

40th District Republican primary details

Republican Primary, 40th District
Party	Candidate	Votes	%
Republican	Kris G Gulick	648	98.33
Write-in		11	1.67
Total votes		659	100.00

2024 Iowa Senate election, 40th District
Party	Candidate	Votes	%
Democratic	Art Staed	18,157	55.10
Republican	Kris G Gulick	14,763	44.80
Write-in		30	0.09
Total votes		32,950	100.0
Democratic hold			

=== District 42 ===
42nd District Republican primary details

Republican Primary, 42nd District
Party	Candidate	Votes	%
Republican	Charlie McClintock (incumbent)	2,211	98.84
Write-in		26	1.16
Total votes		2,237	100.00

2024 Iowa Senate election, 42nd District
Party	Candidate	Votes	%
Republican	Charlie McClintock (Incumbent)	27,726	97.22
Write-in		792	2.78
Total votes		28,518	100.0
Republican hold			

=== District 44 ===
44th District Republican primary details

Republican Primary, 44th District
Party	Candidate	Votes	%
Republican	Adrian Dickey (incumbent)	3,503	98.32
Write-in		60	1.68
Total votes		3,563	100.00

2024 Iowa Senate election, 44th District
Party	Candidate	Votes	%
Republican	Adrian Dickey (Incumbent)	19,207	68.32
Independent	Lisa Ossian	8,826	31.39
Write-in		81	0.29
Total votes		28,114	100.0
Republican hold			

=== District 46 ===
46th District Democratic primary details

Democratic Primary, 46th District
Party	Candidate	Votes	%
Democratic	Ed Chabal	1,062	99.16
Write-in		9	0.84
Total votes		1,071	100.00

46th District Republican primary details

Republican Primary, 46th District
Party	Candidate	Votes	%
Republican	Dawn Driscoll (incumbent)	2,480	99.04
Write-in		24	0.96
Total votes		2,504	100.00

2024 Iowa Senate election, 46th District
Party	Candidate	Votes	%
Republican	Dawn Driscoll (Incumbent)	21,399	60.67
Democratic	Ed Chabal	13,769	39.22
Write-in		38	0.11
Total votes		35,106	100.0
Republican hold			

=== District 48 ===
48th District Democratic primary details

Democratic Primary, 48th District
Party	Candidate	Votes	%
Democratic	John Dabeet	473	100.00
Total votes		473	100.00

48th District Republican primary details

Republican Primary, 48th District
Party	Candidate	Votes	%
Republican	Mark Lofgren (incumbent)	2,062	98.99
Write-in		21	1.01
Total votes		2,083	100.00

2024 Iowa Senate election, 48th District
Party	Candidate	Votes	%
Republican	Mark Lofgren (Incumbent)	19,755	65.67
Democratic	John Dabeet	10,281	34.18
Write-in		45	0.15
Total votes		30,081	100.0
Republican hold			

=== District 50 ===
50th District Democratic primary details

Democratic Primary, 50th District
Party	Candidate	Votes	%
Democratic	Nannette Griffin	552	99.28
Write-in		4	0.72
Total votes		556	100.00

50th District Republican primary details

Republican Primary, 50th District
Party	Candidate	Votes	%
Republican	Jeff Reichman (incumbent)	1,665	98.64
Write-in		23	1.36
Total votes		1,688	100.00

2024 Iowa Senate election, 50th District
Party	Candidate	Votes	%
Republican	Jeff Reichman (Incumbent)	16,735	58.40
Democratic	Nannette Griffin	11,869	41.42
Write-in		50	0.17
Total votes		28,654	100.0
Republican hold			
