= Matt Blake (politician) =

American politician

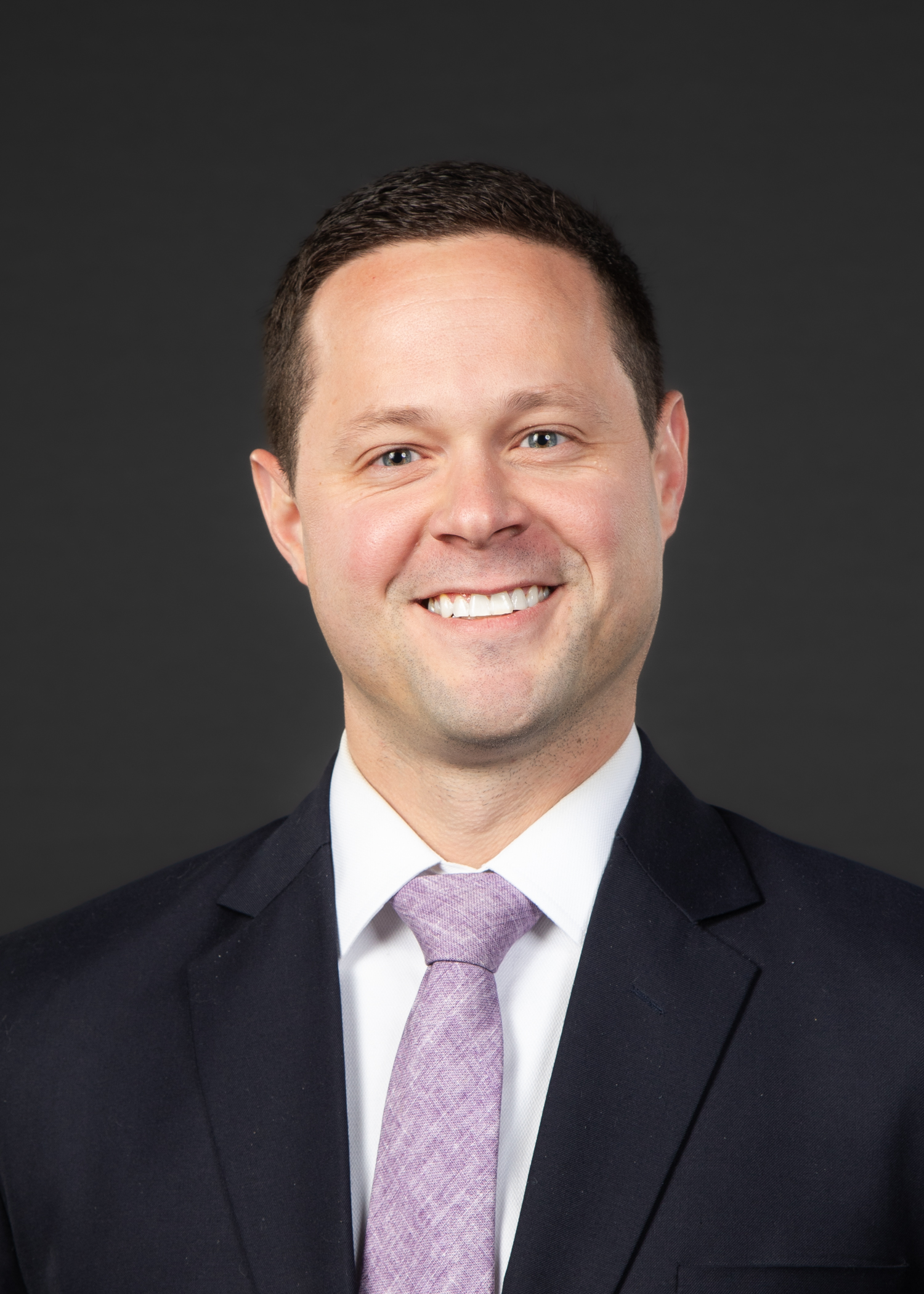
- Official portrait, 2025

Member of the Iowa Senate from the 22nd district
- Incumbent
- Assumed office January 2, 2025
- Preceded by: Brad Zaun

Personal details
- Born: April 27, 1988 (age 38) South Dakota, U.S.
- Party: Democratic
- Education: University of South Dakota (BA); Drake University (JD)
- Profession: Attorney
- Website: www.mattblakeforiowa.com

Matthew Delton Blake is an American politician. He was elected to the Iowa Senate in the 2024 Iowa Senate election.

Blake was a member of the city council in Urbandale, Iowa. In the 2024 Iowa Senate election, he unseated incumbent Brad Zaun.
