= Senator Driscoll =

Senator Driscoll may refer to:

- Alfred E. Driscoll (1902–1975), New Jersey State Senate
- Dawn Driscoll (born 1978), Iowa State Senate
- Robyn Driscoll (born 1962), Montana State Senate
- William Driscoll (fl. 2010s–2020s), Massachusetts State Senate

== See also ==
- Ogden Driskill (born 1959), Wyoming State Senate
