= 2010 United States House of Representatives elections in Iowa =

- November 2, 2010

All 5 Iowa seats to the United States House of Representatives
	Majority party	Minority party
Party	Democratic	Republican
Last election	3	2
Seats won	3	2
Seat change	Steady	Steady
Popular vote	479,874	597,414
Percentage	43.36%	53.99%
Swing	▼7.95%	▲6.78%

Democratic
40–50%
50–60%
60–70%
Republican
40–50%
50–60%
60–70%
70–80%
80–90%

The 2010 House elections in Iowa occurred on November 2, 2010, and elected the members of the State of Iowa's delegation to the United States House of Representatives. Representatives are elected for two-year terms; those elected served in the 112th Congress from January 3, 2011, until January 3, 2013. Iowa has five seats in the House, apportioned according to the 2000 United States census.

These elections were held concurrently with the United States Senate elections of 2010 (including one in Iowa), the United States House elections in other states, and various state and local elections. All five of Iowa's incumbent representatives were re-elected.

Despite losing the popular vote, Democrats won a majority of congressional districts in Iowa. As a result, Iowa became one of four states in which the party that won the state's popular vote did not win a majority of seats in 2010, the other states being New Jersey, Illinois, and North Carolina.

== Overview ==
United States House of Representatives elections in Iowa, 2010
Party	Votes	Percentage	Seats before	Seats after	+/–
Republican	597,414	53.9%	2	2	0
Democratic	479,874	43.3%	3	3	0
Libertarian	8,443	0.76%	0	0	0
Independent	20,860	1.88%	0	0	0
Totals	1,106,591	100.00%	5	5	—

=== By district ===
Results of the 2010 United States House of Representatives elections in Iowa by district:

District	Republican		Democratic		Others		Total		Result
District	Votes	%	Votes	%	Votes	%	Votes	%	Result
District 1	100,219	47.52%	104,428	49.51%	6,255	2.97%	210,902	100%	Democratic hold
District 2	104,319	45.92%	115,839	50.99%	7,017	3.09%	227,175	100%	Democratic hold
District 3	111,925	46.49%	122,147	50.73%	6,684	2.78%	240,756	100%	Democratic hold
District 4	152,588	65.62%	74,300	31.95%	5,631	2.42%	232,519	100%	Republican hold
District 5	128,363	65.75%	63,160	32.35%	3,716	1.90%	195,239	100%	Republican hold
Total	597,414	53.99%	479,874	43.36%	29,303	2.65%	1,106,591	100%	

== District 1 ==
2010 Iowa's 1st congressional district election
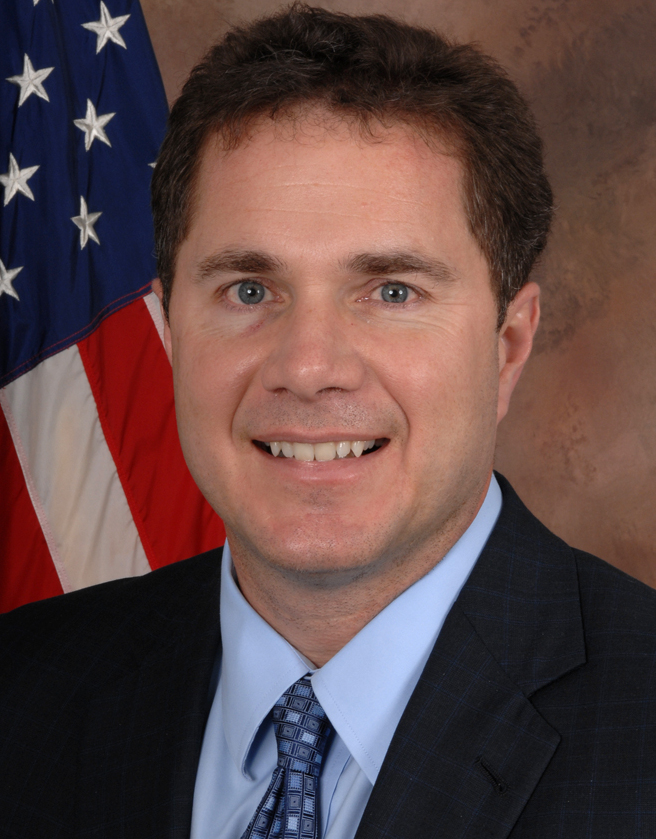

Nominee	Bruce Braley	Ben Lange
Party	Democratic	Republican
Popular vote	104,428	100,219
Percentage	49.5%	47.5%
- County results Braley: 40–50% 50–60% Lange: 40–50% 50–60%
U.S. Representative before election
Bruce Braley (inc.)
Democratic
Elected U.S. Representative
Bruce Braley
Democratic

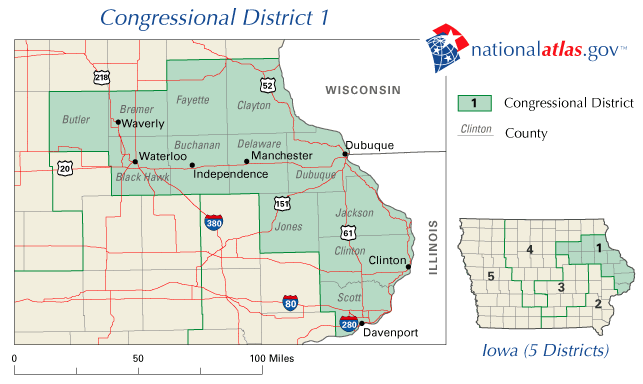

=== Campaign ===
In this liberal-leaning district based in northeastern Iowa, incumbent Democratic Congressman Bruce Braley ran for a third term against Republican attorney Ben Lange, Libertarian Rob Petsche, and independent candidate Jason Faulkner. Though Braley had been overwhelmingly re-elected to his second term two years prior, the anti-Democratic mood in the country contributed to the congressman experiencing a tough fight for re-election. The race attracted the attention of both national party organizations, and thousands of dollars were reserved for airtime by the DCCC and the NRCC. Though Braley emerged victorious on election day, it was by a slim 4,000 vote and two percent margin, which was the thinnest margin of victory out of the entire Iowa congressional delegation.

=== Polling ===
Poll source	Dates administered	Bruce Braley (D)	Ben Lange (R)	Undecided
Voter/Consumer Research	August 31-September 3, 2010	50%	39%	-

==== Predictions ====
Source	Ranking	As of
The Cook Political Report	Lean D	November 1, 2010
Rothenberg	Likely D	November 1, 2010
Sabato's Crystal Ball	Likely D	November 1, 2010
RCP	Lean D	November 1, 2010
CQ Politics	Likely D	October 28, 2010
New York Times	Lean D	November 1, 2010
FiveThirtyEight	Safe D	November 1, 2010

=== Results ===
Iowa's 1st congressional district election, 2010
Party	Candidate	Votes	%
Democratic	Bruce Braley (inc.)	104,428	49.51
Republican	Ben Lange	100,219	47.52
Libertarian	Rob J. Petsche	4,087	1.94
Independent	Jason A. Faulkner	2,092	0.99
Write-ins		76	0.04
Total votes		210,902	100.00
Democratic hold			

== District 2 ==
2010 Iowa's 2nd congressional district election
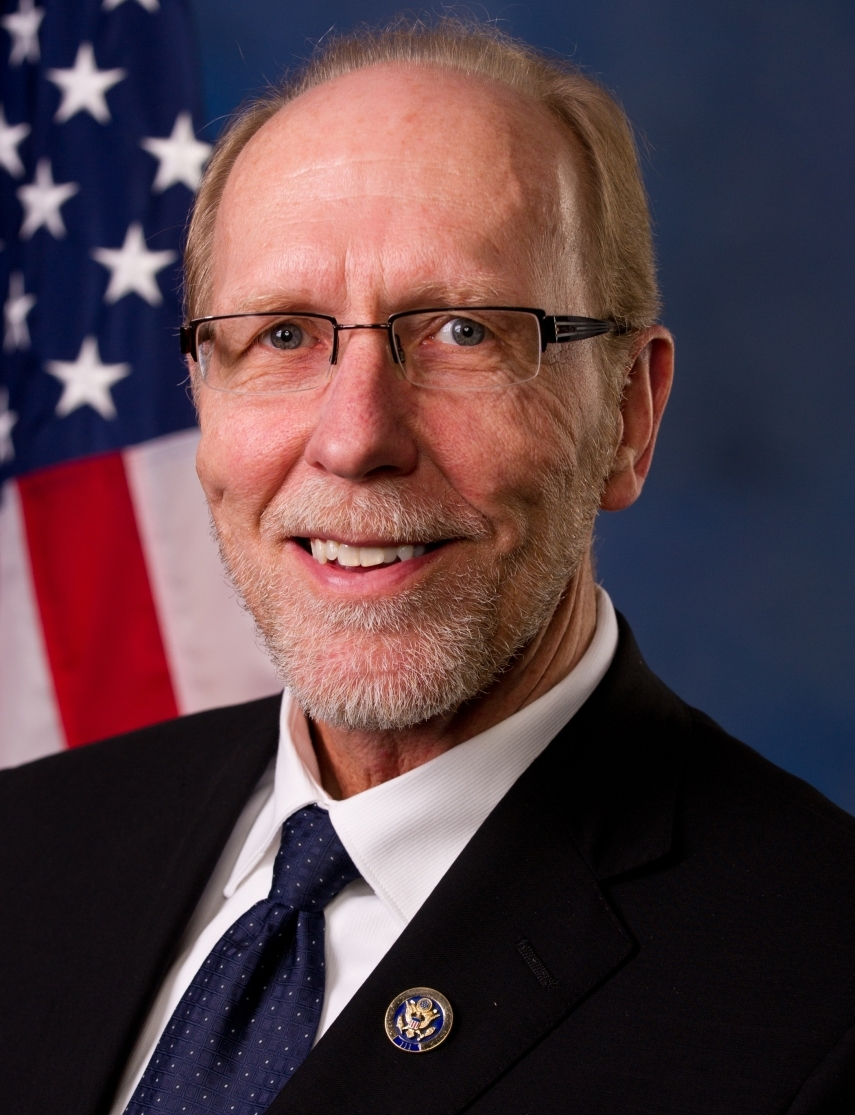

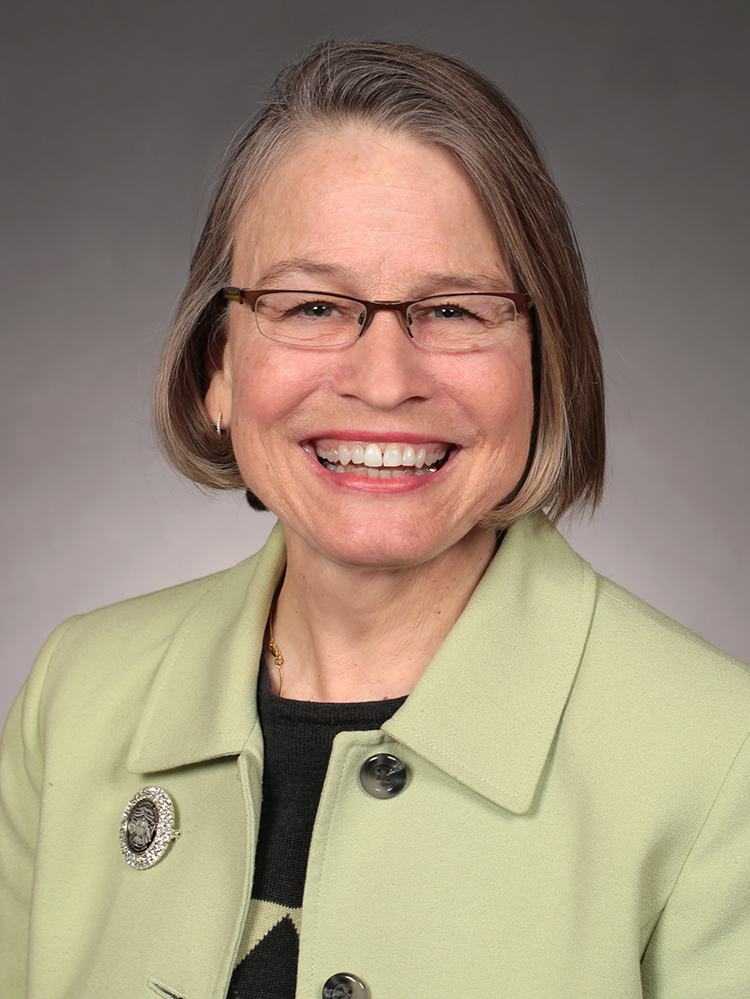
Nominee	Dave Loebsack	Mariannette Miller-Meeks
Party	Democratic	Republican
Popular vote	115,839	104,319
Percentage	51.0%	45.9%
- County results Miller-Meeks: 40–50% 50–60% 60–70% Loebsack: 40–50% 50–60% 60–70%
U.S. Representative before election
Dave Loebsack (inc.)
Democratic
Elected U.S. Representative
Dave Loebsack
Democratic

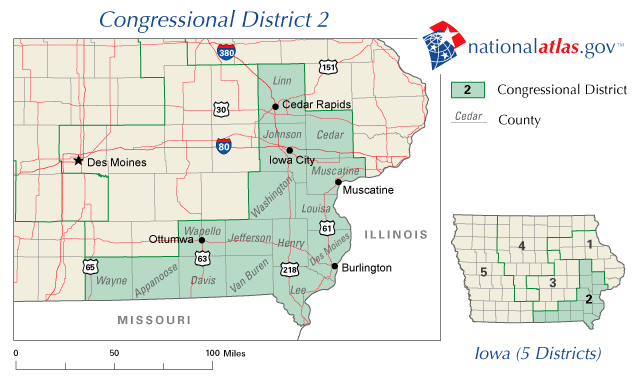

=== Campaign ===
In a rematch from 2008, incumbent Democratic Congressman Dave Loebsack faced Republican challenger Mariannette Miller-Meeks when he ran for a third term in this southeastern Iowa-based district, the most liberal of the congressional districts in the state. Polling indicated that the race would be close, and both parties’ congressional campaign committees spent on television advertisements, but ultimately, Congressman Loebsack defeated Miller-Meeks by a 10,000 vote, five percent margin.

=== Polling ===
Poll source	Dates administered	David Loebsack (D)	Mariannette Miller-Meeks (R)	Gary Sicard (L)	Undecided
Tarrance Group	October 18–19, 2010	44%	45%	1%	11%
Tarrance Group	September 13–14, 2010	41%	40%	6%	13%
Voter/Consumer Research	August 31-September 3, 2010	47%	39%	-	-
Susquehanna Polling and Research	June 23–25, 2010	46%	41%	-	-

==== Predictions ====
Source	Ranking	As of
The Cook Political Report	Lean D	November 1, 2010
Rothenberg	Likely D	November 1, 2010
Sabato's Crystal Ball	Likely D	November 1, 2010
RCP	Lean D	November 1, 2010
CQ Politics	Lean D	October 28, 2010
New York Times	Lean D	November 1, 2010
FiveThirtyEight	Likely D	November 1, 2010

=== Results ===
Iowa's 2nd congressional district election, 2010
Party	Candidate	Votes	%
Democratic	Dave Loebsack (inc.)	115,839	50.99
Republican	Mariannette Miller-Meeks	104,319	45.92
Libertarian	Gary Sicard	4,356	1.92
Constitution	Jon Tack	2,463	1.08
Write-ins		198	0.09
Total votes		227,175	100.00
Democratic hold			

== District 3 ==
2010 Iowa's 3rd congressional district election
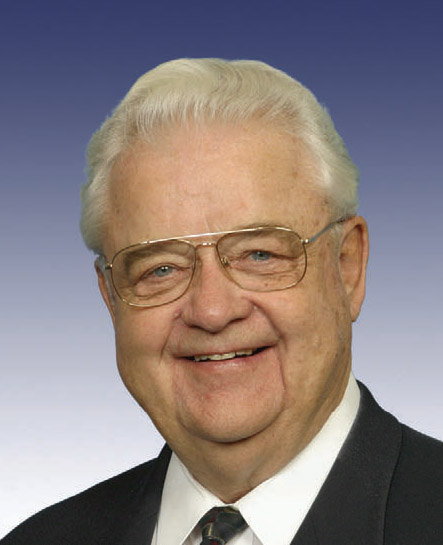

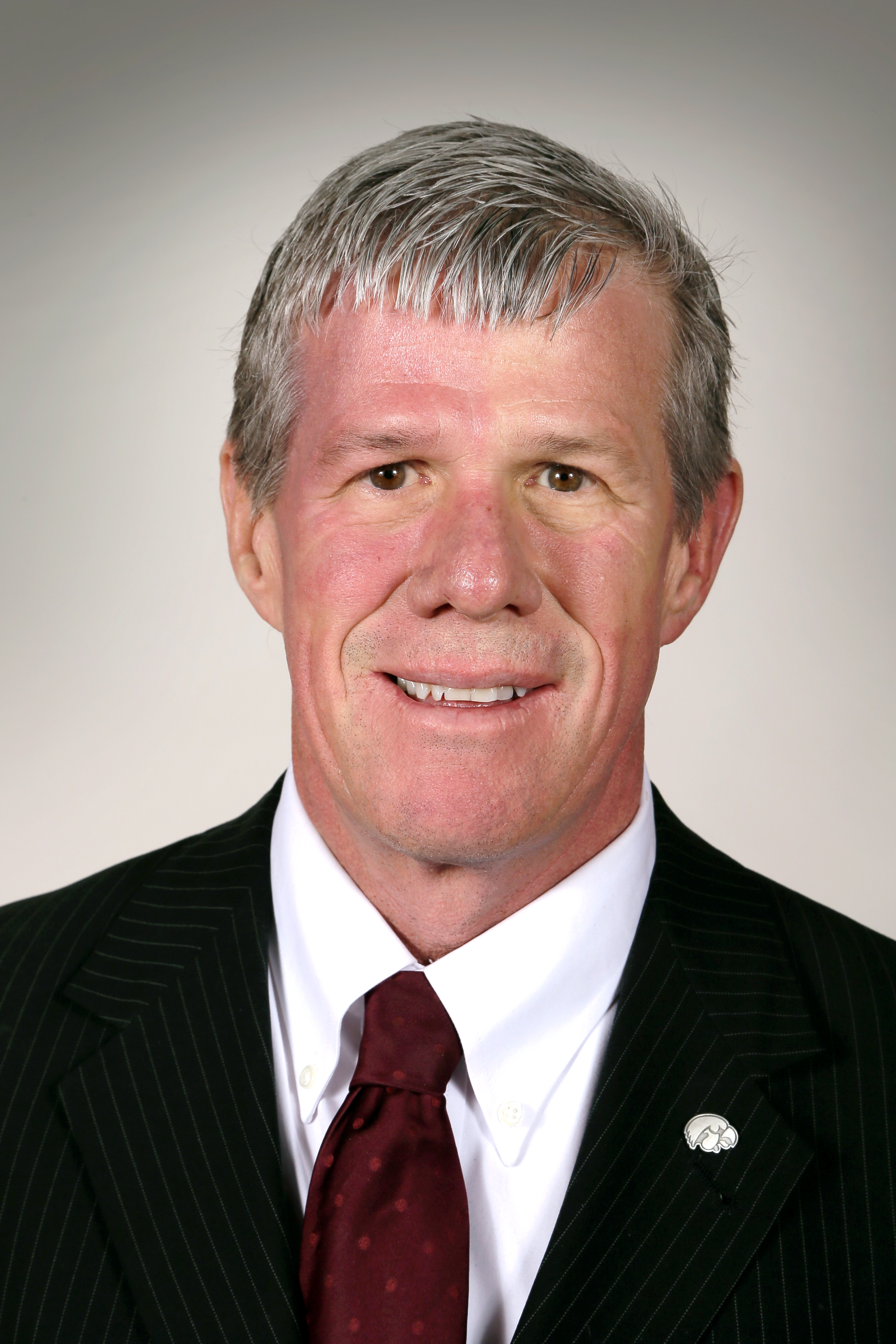
Nominee	Leonard Boswell	Brad Zaun
Party	Democratic	Republican
Popular vote	122,147	111,925
Percentage	50.7%	46.5%
- County results Zaun: 40–50% 50–60% 60–70% Boswell: 50–60%
U.S. Representative before election
Leonard Boswell (inc.)
Democratic
Elected U.S. Representative
Leonard Boswell
Democratic

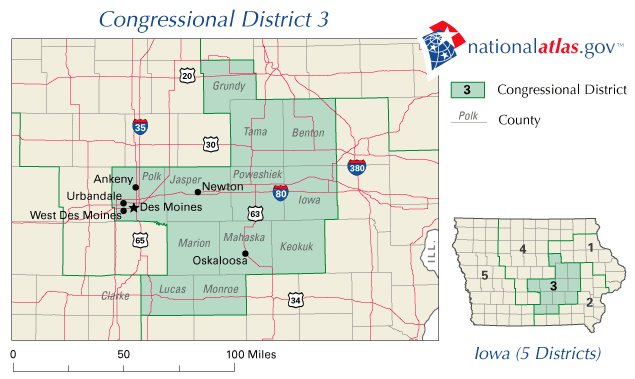

=== Campaign ===
Incumbent Democratic Congressman Leonard Boswell ran for an eighth term in this marginally liberal district that includes parts of the Waterloo – Cedar Falls metropolitan area, metro Des Moines, and Cedar Rapids. Congressman Boswell, who had faced difficult elections every year, faced Republican State Senator Brad Zaun in the general election. Though early polling indicated that Boswell was in trouble, he managed to turn the tide and edged out Zaun by a four percent margin.

=== Polling ===
Poll source	Dates administered	Leonard Boswell (D)	Brad Zaun (R)	Undecided
The Hill/ANGA	October 19–21, 2010	49%	37%	11%
Anzalone Liszt Research	October 2–5, 2010	47%	38%	-
Bennett, Petts and Normington	October 3–4, 2010	49%	41%	-
Voter/Consumer Research	August 31-September 3, 2010	48%	39%	8%
American Action Forum	August 16–18, 2010	41%	51%	8%
Victory Enterprises	August 4–5, 2010	38%	45%	-
Victory Enterprises	June 17, 2010	32%	41%	-

=== Debate ===
2006 Iowa's 3rd congressional district debate
No.	Date	Host	Moderator	Link	Democratic	Republican
Key: P Participant A Absent N Not invited I Invited W Withdrawn						
Key: P Participant A Absent N Not invited I Invited W Withdrawn					Leonard Boswell	Brad Zaun
1		Iowa Politics.com; KCCI	Lynne Campbell; Kevin Cooney	C-SPAN	P	P

==== Predictions ====
Source	Ranking	As of
The Cook Political Report	Lean D	November 1, 2010
Rothenberg	Likely D	November 1, 2010
Sabato's Crystal Ball	Lean D	November 1, 2010
RCP	Lean D	November 1, 2010
CQ Politics	Lean D	October 28, 2010
New York Times	Lean D	November 1, 2010
FiveThirtyEight	Likely D	November 1, 2010

=== Results ===
Iowa's 3rd congressional district election, 2010
Party	Candidate	Votes	%
Democratic	Leonard Boswell (inc.)	122,147	50.73
Republican	Brad Zaun	111,925	46.49
Socialist Workers	Rebecca Williamson	6,258	2.60
Write-ins		426	0.18
Total votes		240,756	100.00
Democratic hold			

== District 4 ==
2010 Iowa's 4th congressional district election
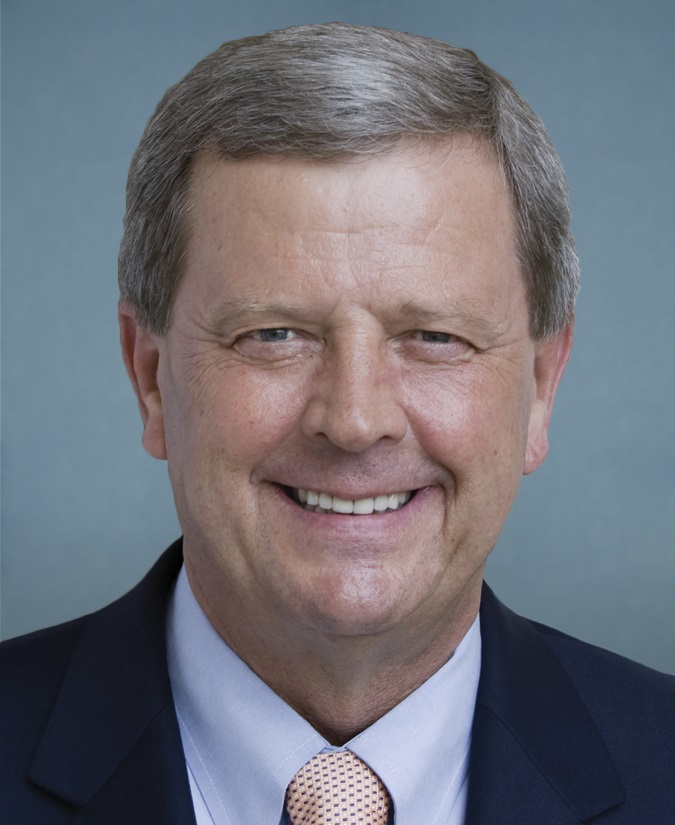

Nominee	Tom Latham	Bill Maske
Party	Republican	Democratic
Popular vote	152,588	74,300
Percentage	65.6%	31.9%
- County results Latham: 50–60% 60–70% 70–80%
U.S. Representative before election
Tom Latham (inc.)
Republican
Elected U.S. Representative
Tom Latham
Republican

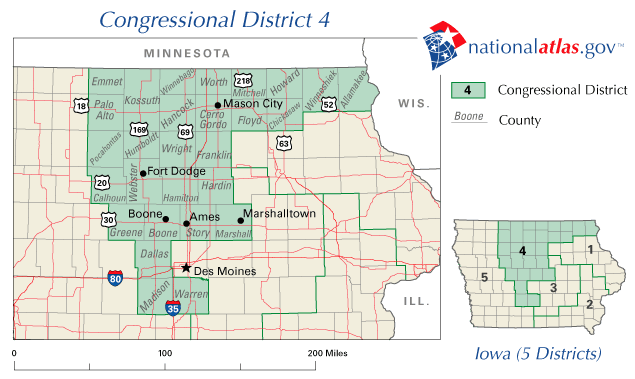

=== Campaign ===
Though Republican Congressman Tom Latham represented a centrist district, he had never had much trouble winning re-election since he was first elected in 1994. This year, Congressman Latham faced the Democratic nominee, Bill Maske, a school superintendent, and independent candidate Dan Lensing. Latham was never in danger of losing his seat, and managed to crush Maske and Lensing to win a ninth term in Congress.

==== Predictions ====
Source	Ranking	As of
The Cook Political Report	Safe R	November 1, 2010
Rothenberg	Safe R	November 1, 2010
Sabato's Crystal Ball	Safe R	November 1, 2010
RCP	Safe R	November 1, 2010
CQ Politics	Safe R	October 28, 2010
New York Times	Safe R	November 1, 2010
FiveThirtyEight	Safe R	November 1, 2010

=== Results ===
Iowa's 4th congressional district election, 2010
Party	Candidate	Votes	%
Republican	Tom Latham (inc.)	152,588	65.62
Democratic	Bill Maske	74,300	31.95
Independent	Dan Lensing	5,499	2.36
Write-ins		132	0.07
Total votes		232,519	100.00
Republican hold			

== District 5 ==
2010 Iowa's 5th congressional district election
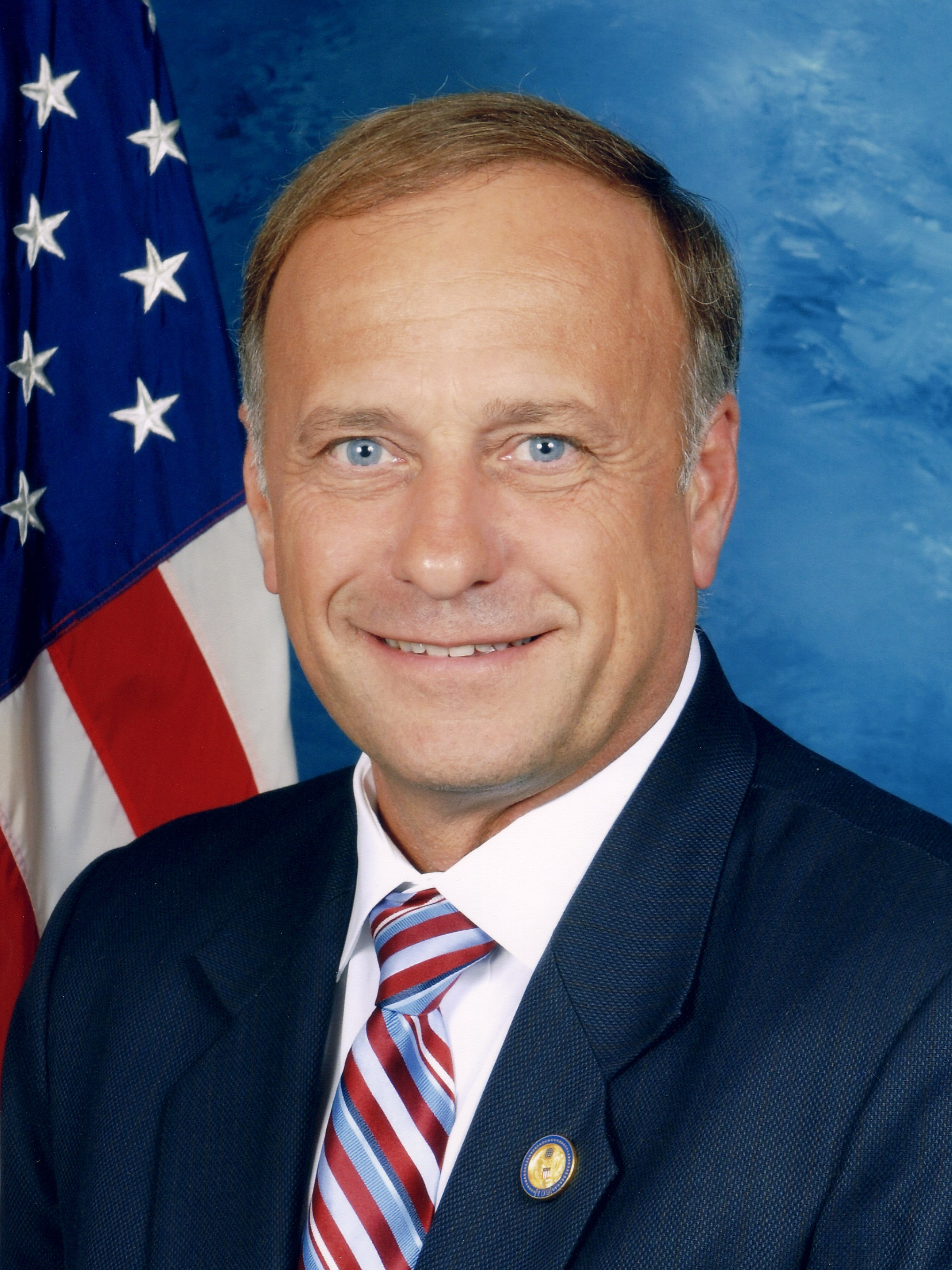

Nominee	Steve King	Matthew Campbell
Party	Republican	Democratic
Popular vote	128,363	63,160
Percentage	65.8%	32.4%
- County results King: 50–60% 60–70% 70–80% 80–90%
U.S. Representative before election
Steve King (inc.)
Republican
Elected U.S. Representative
Steve King
Republican

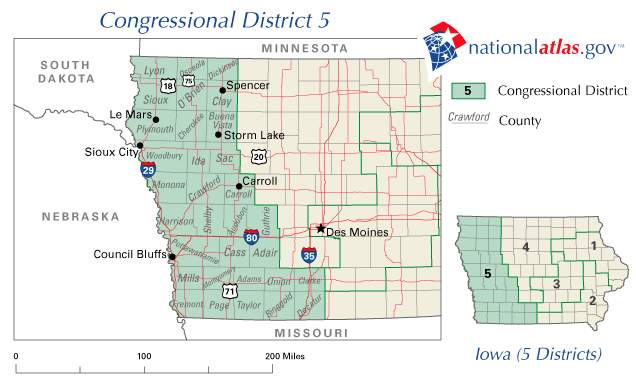

=== Campaign ===
Congressman Steve King, a Republican, represented the most conservative district in Iowa, which is rooted in the staunchly conservative areas of western Iowa. King was an outspoken conservative seeking his fifth term in Congress, and he faced Democrat Matthew Campbell in the general election. Though Democrats had high hopes for Campbell's campaign, he was ultimately not able to beat back the conservative tendencies of the district, and lost to King in a landslide.

==== Predictions ====
Source	Ranking	As of
The Cook Political Report	Safe R	November 1, 2010
Rothenberg	Safe R	November 1, 2010
Sabato's Crystal Ball	Safe R	November 1, 2010
RCP	Safe R	November 1, 2010
CQ Politics	Safe R	October 28, 2010
New York Times	Safe R	November 1, 2010
FiveThirtyEight	Safe R	November 1, 2010

=== Results ===
Iowa's 5th congressional district election, 2010
Party	Candidate	Votes	%
Republican	Steve King (inc.)	128,363	65.75
Democratic	Matthew Campbell	63,160	32.35
Independent	Martin James Monroe	3,622	1.86
Write-ins		94	0.05
Total votes		195,239	100.00
Republican hold			
