= 2026 Iowa Secretary of State election =

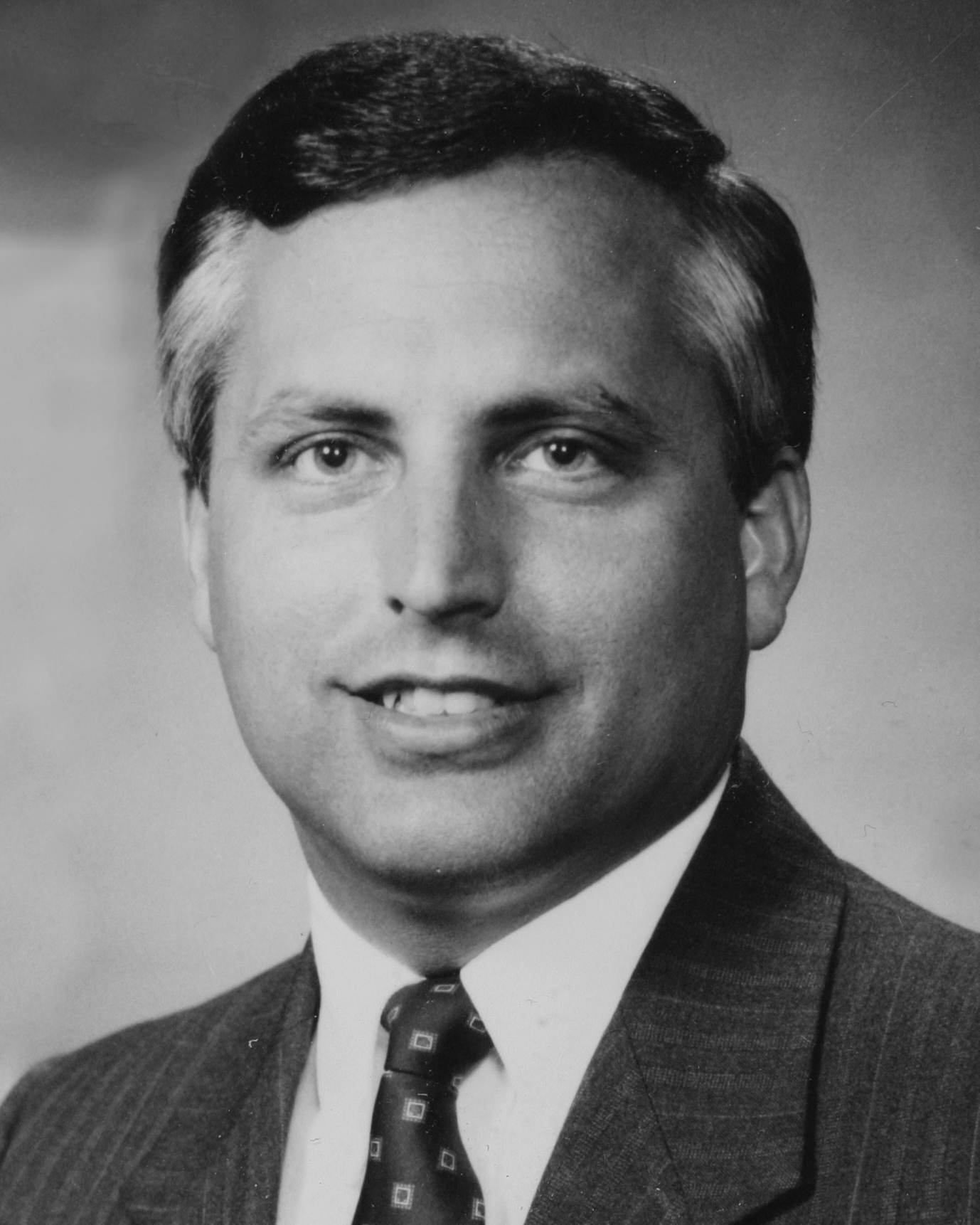

Nominee	Paul Pate	Ryan Peterman
Party	Republican	Democratic
Popular vote	711,768	625,867
Percentage	53.2%	46.8%
- Pate: 50–60% 60–70% 70–80% 80–90% Peterman: 50–60% 70–80%
Secretary of State before election
Paul Pate
Republican
Elected Secretary of State
Paul Pate
Republican

The 2026 Iowa Secretary of State election took place on November 3, 2026, to elect the Secretary of State of Iowa, concurrently with elections to the United States Senate, U.S. House of Representatives, governor, and other state and local elections. Primary elections were held on June 2, 2026.

Incumbent Republican secretary Paul Pate won re-election to a fifth overall and fourth consecutive term in office.

== Republican primary ==
=== Candidates ===
==== Nominee ====
- Paul Pate, incumbent secretary of state (1995–1999, 2015–present)

=== Results ===
Republican primary results
Party	Candidate	Votes	%
Republican	Paul Pate (incumbent)	183,807	99.6
Write-in		827	0.5
Total votes		184,634	100.0

== Democratic primary ==
=== Candidates ===
==== Nominee ====
- Ryan Peterman, former legislative assistant to Jeanne Shaheen

=== Endorsements ===
Ryan Peterman

Organizations

- VoteVets

=== Results ===
Democratic primary results
Party	Candidate	Votes	%
Democratic	Ryan Peterman	176,658	99.8
Write-in		438	0.3
Total votes		177,096	100.0

== General election ==
=== Predictions ===
Source	Ranking	As of
Sabato's Crystal Ball	Tossup	October 29, 2026

=== Polling ===
Poll source	Date(s) administered	Sample size (Note: Key: A – all adults RV – registered voters LV – likely voters V – unclear)	Margin of error	Paul Pate (R)	Ryan Peterman (D)	Undecided
Change Research (D) (Note: Poll sponsored by Peterman's campaign)	September 11–14, 2026	704 (LV)	± 3.9%	42%	40%	18%

==== Results ====
2026 Iowa Secretary of State election results
Party	Candidate	Votes	%	±%
Republican	Paul Pate (incumbent)	711,768	53.2	−6.85
Democratic	Ryan Peterman	625,867	46.8	+6.92
Total votes		1,337,635	100.0	

== Notes ==
Partisan clients
