= 2018 Iowa Secretary of State election =

- November 6, 2018
- Registered: 2,167,914
- Turnout: 61.55%
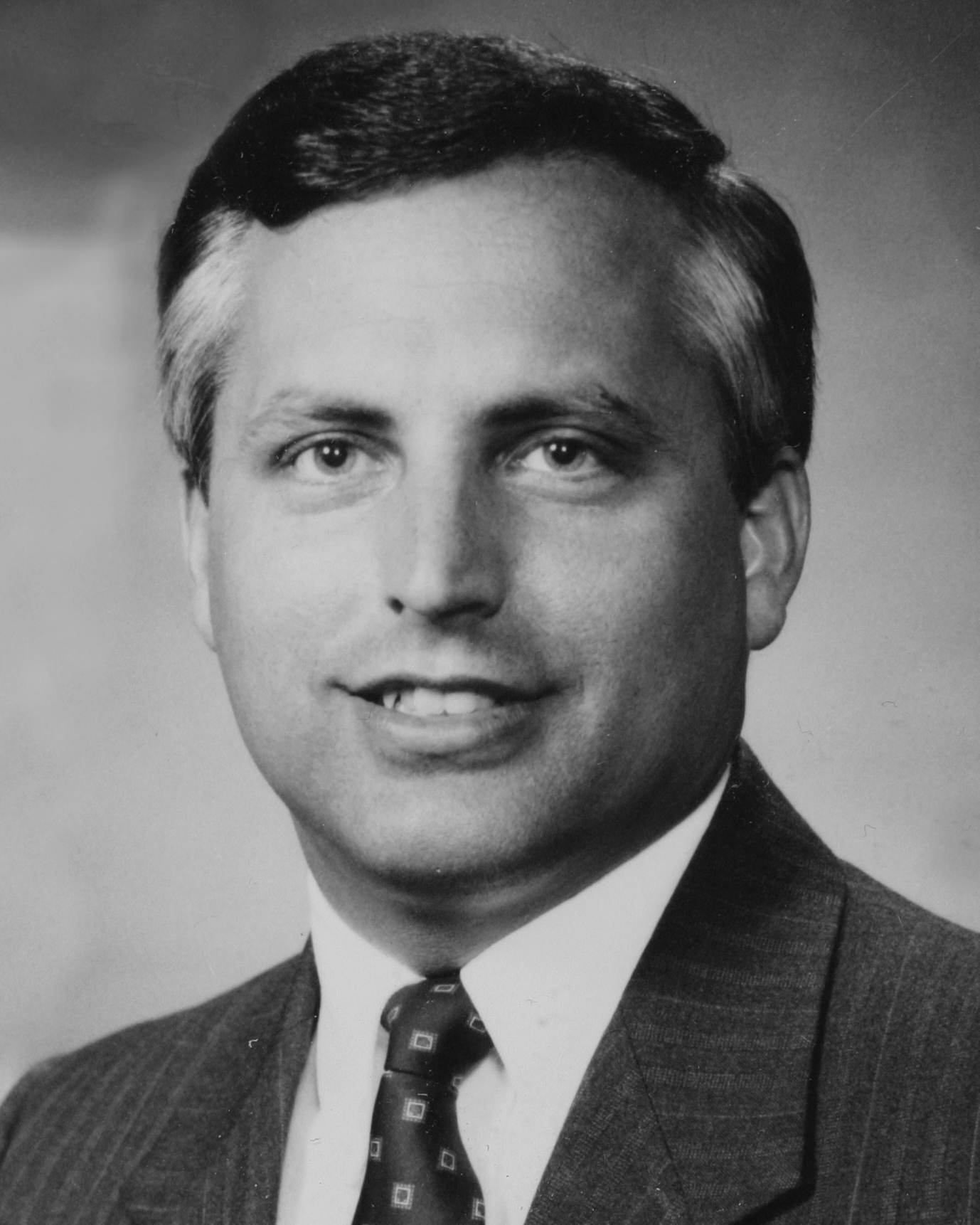

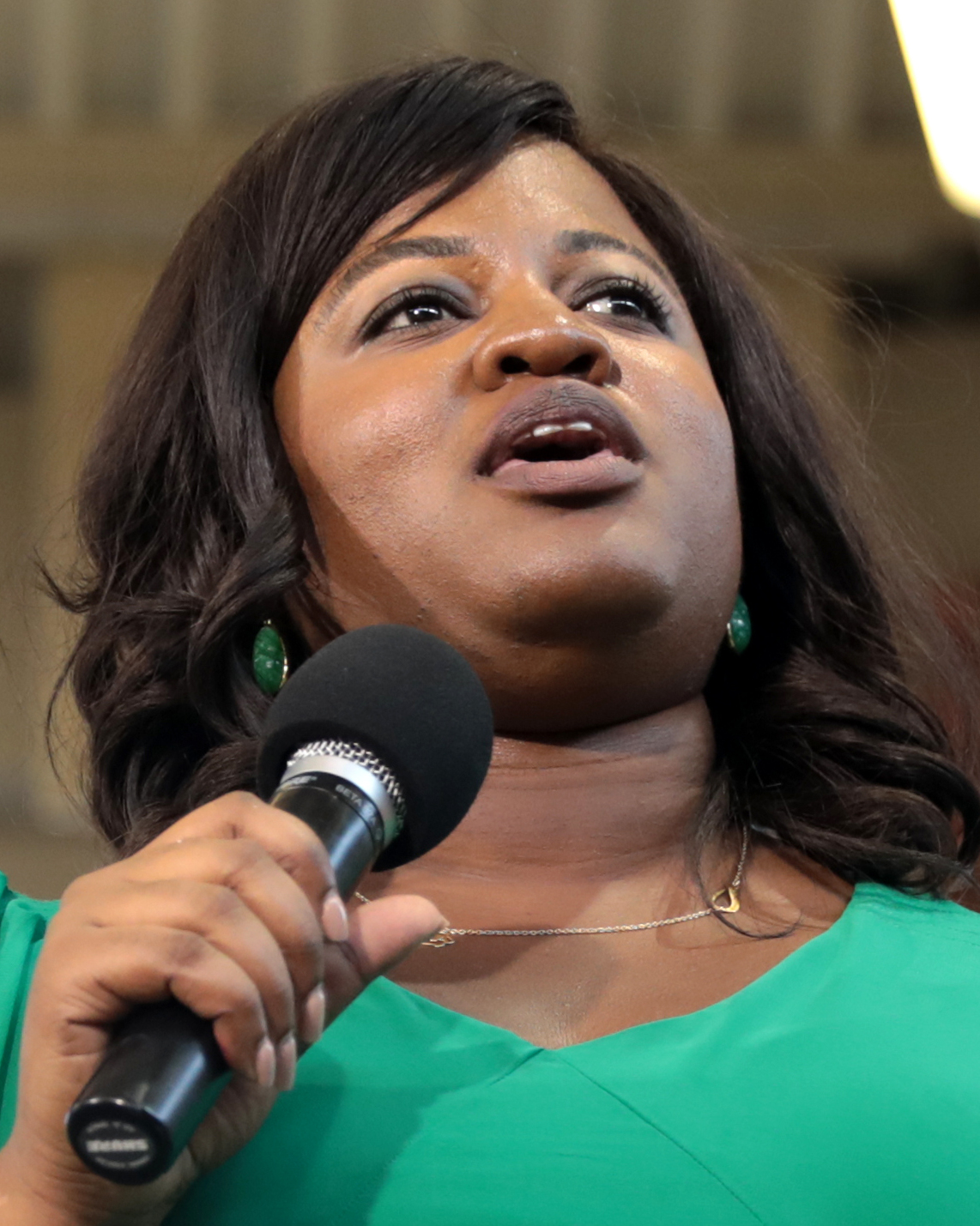
| Candidate | Paul Pate | Deidre DeJear |
| Party | Republican | Democratic |
| Popular vote | 685,780 | 583,774 |
| Percentage | 52.72% | 44.87% |
- Pate: 40–50% 50–60% 60–70% 70–80% 80–90% DeJear: 50–60% 60–70%
Secretary of State before election
Paul Pate
Republican
Elected Secretary of State
Paul Pate
Republican

The 2018 Iowa Secretary of State election was held on November 6, 2018, to elect the Secretary of State of Iowa, concurrently with elections to the United States House of Representatives, governor, and other state and local elections. Primary elections were held on June 5, 2018.

Incumbent Republican secretary of state Paul Pate won re-election to a second consecutive term in office, (Note: Pate previously served as Secretary of State from 1995-1999, before being elected once again in 2014.) defeating Democratic nominee Deidre DeJear.

== Republican primary ==
=== Candidates ===
==== Nominee ====
- Paul Pate, incumbent secretary of state (2015-present, 1995-1999), mayor of Cedar Rapids (2002-2006), and state senator (1989-1995)

=== Results ===
Republican primary results
| Party | Candidate | Votes | % |
|---|---|---|---|
| Republican | Paul Pate (incumbent) | 88,303 | 99.63% |
| Write-in | | 327 | 0.37% |
| Total votes | | 88,630 | 100.00% |

== Democratic primary ==
=== Candidates ===
==== Nominee ====
- Deidre DeJear, marketing firm owner

==== Eliminated in primary ====
- Jim Mowrer, army veteran, professor, and former Pentagon aide

==== Withdrew before primary ====
- Travis Weipert, auditor of Johnson County

==== Declined ====
- Nathan Blake, attorney
- Jamie Fitzgerald, auditor of Polk County
- Roxanna Moritz, auditor of Scott County
- Eric Van Lancker, auditor of Clinton County

=== Results ===
Democratic primary results
| Party | Candidate | Votes | % |
|---|---|---|---|
| Democratic | Deidre DeJear | 82,221 | 51.09% |
| Democratic | Jim Mowrer | 78,409 | 48.72% |
| Write-in | | 312 | 0.19% |
| Total votes | | 160,942 | 100.00% |

== General election ==
=== Post-primary endorsements ===
Paul Pate (R)

Organizations

- Iowa Association of Business and Industry
Deidre DeJear (D)

U.S. presidents

- Barack Obama, President of the United States (2009-2017) and U.S. Senator from Illinois (2005-2008)

U.S. senators

- Kamala Harris, U.S. Senator from California (2017-present) and Attorney General of California (2011-2017)

State officials

- Jason Kander, former Missouri Secretary of State (2013-2017) and state representative from the 44th district (2009-2013)

Labor unions

- IUOE Local 150

=== Predictions ===
| Source | Ranking | As of |
|---|---|---|
| Governing | Tossup | October 11, 2018 |

=== Results ===
2018 Iowa Secretary of State election
| Party | Candidate | Votes | % |
|---|---|---|---|
| Republican | Paul Pate (incumbent) | 685,780 | 52.72% |
| Democratic | Deidre DeJear | 583,774 | 44.87% |
| Libertarian | Jules Ofenbakh | 30,881 | 2.37% |
| Write-in | | 482 | 0.04% |
| Total votes | | 1,300,917 | 100.00% |
| Republican hold | | | |

==== By congressional district ====
Pate won all four congressional districts, including three that elected Democrats.

| District | Pate | DeJear | Representative |
|---|---|---|---|
| 1st | 51% | 46% | Rod Blum (115th Congress) |
| 1st | 51% | 46% | Abby Finkenauer (116th Congress) |
| 2nd | 49% | 48% | Dave Loebsack |
| 3rd | 49% | 48% | David Young (115th Congress) |
| 3rd | 49% | 48% | Cindy Axne (116th Congress) |
| 4th | 61% | 37% | Steve King |
