= Brad Hart =

American attorney and politician

Mayor of Cedar Rapids
- In office January 2018 – January 2022
- Preceded by: Ron Corbett
- Succeeded by: Tiffany O'Donnell

Personal details
- Political party: Republican
- Education: Iowa State University (BA); South Texas College of Law (JD)

Bradley G. Hart is an American attorney and politician who served as the mayor of Cedar Rapids, Iowa from 2018 to 2022. As the role of mayor is a part-time position, Hart continued to work as a business lawyer at Bradley & Riley during his term.

== Education ==
Hart earned his bachelor's degree from Iowa State University, followed by a Juris Doctor from the South Texas College of Law (then known as the "Houston College of Law").

== Career ==
After graduating from law school, Hart began his career in Houston, Texas before relocating to Iowa to work at Bradley & Riley, where he specializes in corporate mergers and business law. In the November 2017 Mayoral election, Hart competed against city councilor, Monica Vernon. As neither candidate earned more than 50 percent of votes cast in the general election, both continued on to a runoff held in December 2017. In the runoff, Hart earned 54.3 percent of votes to Vernon's 45.6 percent.

In February 2019, Hart appeared on C-SPAN to discuss recovery from the Iowa flood of 2008 and the growing infrastructure crisis in Iowa. Hart later met with President Donald Trump to lobby for flood protection.

Hart sought reelection to a second term as mayor in 2021. However, in November 2021, he failed to advance to the run-off, finishing only 41 votes behind second-place challenger Amara Andrews. In the subsequent runoff election, Hart endorsed fellow Republican Tiffany O'Donnell. The runoff election was held on November 30, 2021, with O'Donnell overwhelmingly defeating Andrews.

== See also ==
- List of mayors of Cedar Rapids, Iowa
