= Kay Halloran =

American politician and attorney (1937–2026)

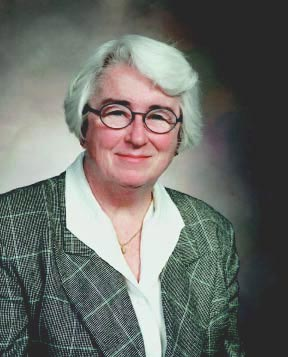

Mayor of Cedar Rapids
- In office 2006–2009
- Preceded by: Paul Pate
- Succeeded by: Ron Corbett

Member of the Iowa House of Representatives from the 56th district 49th (1983–1992)
- In office January 13, 1997 – January 7, 2001

Personal details
- Born: January 19, 1937 Estherville, Iowa, U.S.
- Died: June 14, 2026 (aged 89) Marion, Iowa, U.S.
- Party: Democratic
- Spouse: Allen R. Chapman
- Children: 2
- Education: State University of Iowa (BA, JD)
- Occupation: Lawyer

Kathleen Halloran Chapman (January 19, 1937 – June 14, 2026), known as Kay Chapman or Kay Halloran, was an American politician and attorney who served as Mayor of Cedar Rapids, Iowa from 2006 to 2009.

== Early life and education ==
Halloran was born in Estherville, Iowa on January 19, 1937. She graduated from Franklin High School in Cedar Rapids before earning a Bachelor of Arts degree in Political Science from the State University of Iowa. She later returned to her alma mater to earn a Juris Doctor.

== Career ==
A Democrat, she previously served as a member of the Iowa House of Representatives, and a member of the Mayors Against Illegal Guns Coalition, an organization formed in 2006 and co-chaired by New York City mayor Michael Bloomberg and Boston mayor Thomas Menino.

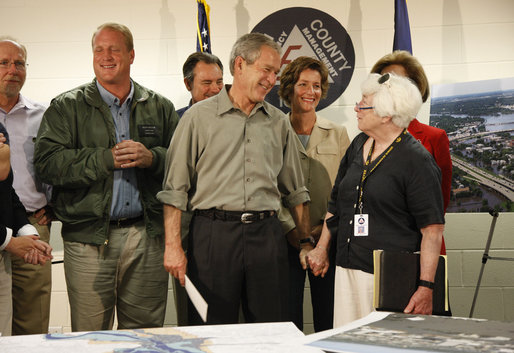
Kay Halloran (far right) with George W. Bush after the Iowa flood of 2008.

Halloran was the first woman to enter into private law practice in Cedar Rapids, and the city's second female mayor. Halloran opted not to run for re-election after being diagnosed with breast cancer.

== Death ==
Halloran died on June 14, 2026, at the age of 89.

== See also ==
- List of mayors of Cedar Rapids, Iowa

Preceded by Paul Pate	Mayor of Cedar Rapids; 2005–2009	Succeeded by Ron Corbett
