= List of mayors of Cedar Rapids, Iowa =

The following is a list of mayors of the city of Cedar Rapids, Iowa, United States.

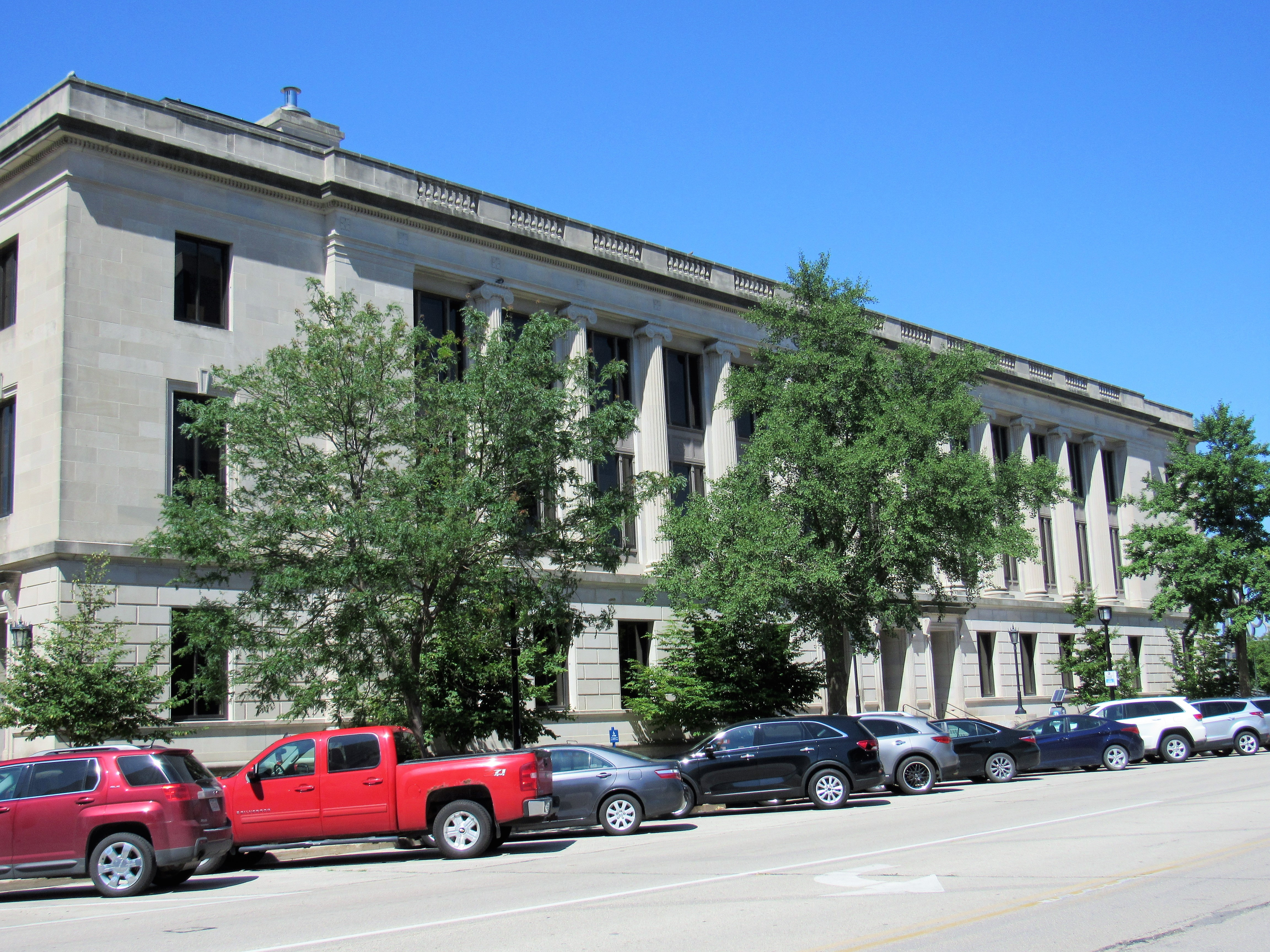
City hall building in Cedar Rapids, Iowa (photo 2019)

- Isaac N. Whittam, 1856-1857
- R. C. Rock, 1858
- D. N. Sprague, 1859
- E. H. Stedman, 1860
- Homer Bishop, 1861
- T. Z. Cook, 1862, 1871
- Mowry Farnum, 1863-1864
- H. Church, 1865
- A. R. West, 1866–1867, 1869
- J. P. Coulter, 1868
- William B. Leach, 1870
- E. S. Hill, 1872
- J. F. Charles, 1873
- A. B. Hull, 1874
- J. H. Smith, 1875–1876, 1880-1881
- W. S. Bradley, 1877
- J. T. Hamilton, 1878
- O. N. Hull, 1879
- Charles A. Clark, 1882
- John W. Henderson, 1883
- C. W. Eaton, 1884, 1886-1887
- F. C. Hormel, 1885
- P. Mullaly, 1888-1889
- J. J. Snouffer, 1890
- John B. Henderson, 1891-1892
- William P. Daniels, 1893-1894
- George A. Lincoln, 1895-1897
- John M. Redmond, 1898-1900
- Charles D. Huston, 1901-1905
- Amos H. Connor, 1906-1907
- George S. Lightner, c.1907
- J. T. Carmody, 1908
- Matt J. Miles, 1909-1911
- J.F. Rall, c.1920
- C.D. Huston, c.1922
- Frank K. Hahn, c.1950
- Clarence L. Sedive, c.1951-1952
- Milo J. Sedlacek, c.1952-1955
- James J. Meaghan, 1956-1961
- Robert M. L. Johnson, 1962-1967
- Frank A. Bosh, 1968-1969
- Donald J. Canney, 1969–1992
- Larry Serbousek, c.1992–1995
- Lee R. Clancey, 1996–2001
- Paul Pate, 2002–2005
- Kay Halloran, 2006–2009
- Ron J. Corbett, 2010–2017
- Bradley G. Hart, 2018–2021
- Tiffany D. O'Donnell, 2022–present

== See also ==
- Cedar Rapids history
