= Brad Zaun =

American politician

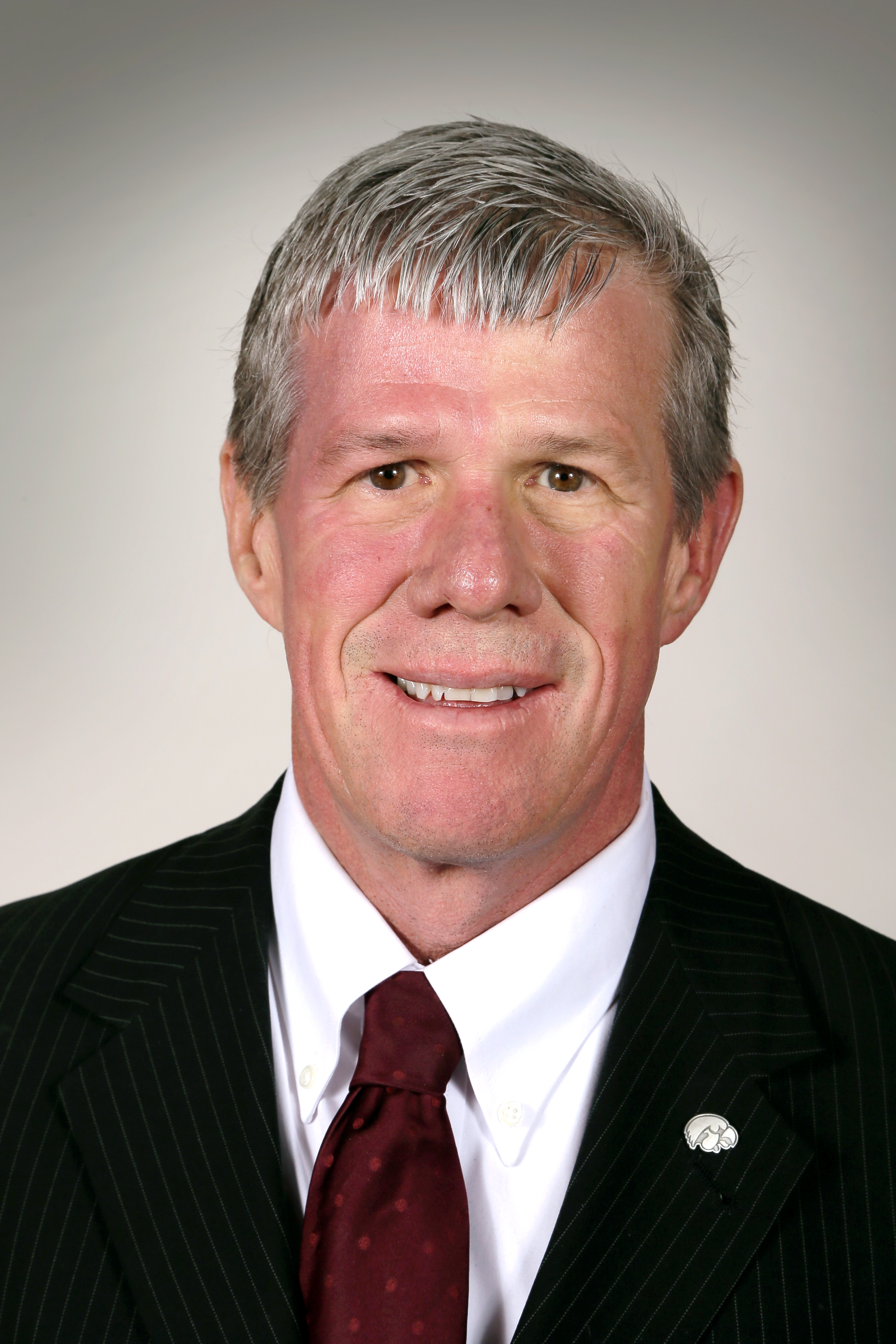
- Official portrait, 2015

President pro tempore of the Iowa Senate
- In office January 11, 2021 – January 13, 2025
- Preceded by: Jerry Behn
- Succeeded by: Ken Rozenboom

Member of the Iowa Senate
- In office January 10, 2005 – January 1, 2025
- Preceded by: Jack Holveck
- Succeeded by: Matt Blake
- Constituency: 32nd district (2005–2013); 20th district (2013–2023); 22nd district (2023–2025)

Personal details
- Born: February 23, 1962 (age 64) Des Moines, Iowa, U.S.
- Party: Republican
- Spouse: Dede
- Children: 5
- Education: Ellsworth Community College; Grand View University (BA)

Bradley Zaun (born February 23, 1962) is an Iowa politician who represented the 22nd District, as well as serving the Iowa Senate President pro tempore. He was the Republican nominee for Iowa's 3rd congressional district in the 2010 general election.

== Iowa Senate ==
Zaun served in the Iowa Senate from 2005 until 2025. He is the former mayor of Urbandale, serving from 1998 to 2005 and a former city council member of Urbandale, serving from 1996 to 1998. He is former owner of Zaun's Hardware and Vice President of R&R Realty Marketing Group, and received his Bachelor's degree from Grand View College.

Zaun served on several committees in the Iowa Senate – the Judiciary committee; the Labor and Business Relations committee; the Rules and Administration committee; the Transportation committee; and the Ways and Means committee, where he was the ranking member. He also served on the Justice Systems Appropriations committee.

In January 2017, Zaun proposed a bill to end tenure in public universities in Iowa.

== Political campaigns ==
=== 2004 ===
Zaun won the race for Iowa's 32nd Senate District.

=== 2008 ===
Zaun was reelected to Iowa's 32nd Senate District, wiinning with 23,190 votes and running unopposed.

=== 2010 ===
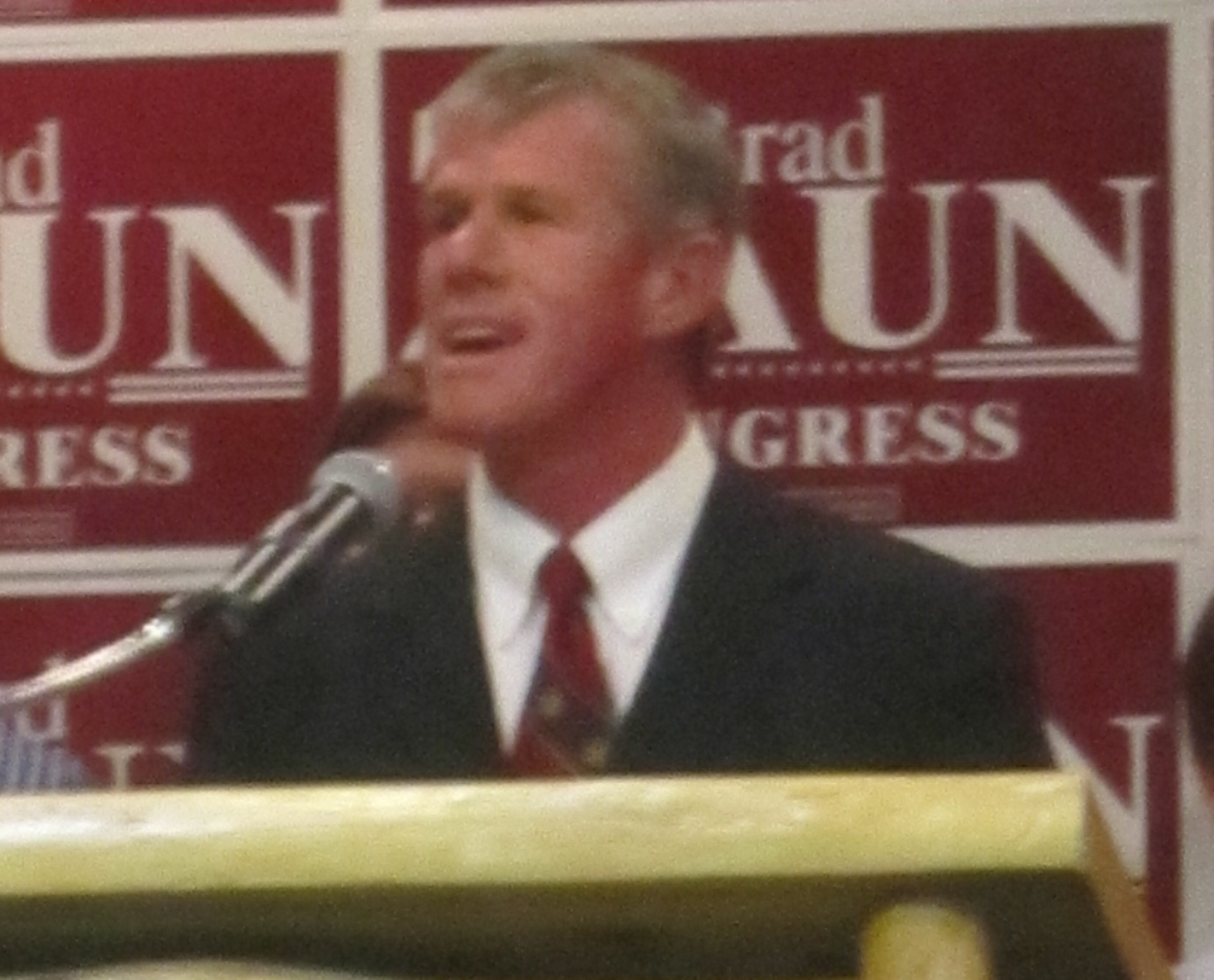
Zaun delivering a concession speech after losing his 2010 congressional campaign

In the 3rd District Republican primary, he won with 42% of the vote in a crowded seven-candidate field to face the district's Democratic incumbent, Leonard Boswell.

=== 2012 ===
Zaun ran in Iowa's 20th Senate District and was re-elected.

=== 2014 ===
After Republican Tom Latham of the newly-redistricted 3rd congressional district announced his retirement, Zaun ran to succeed him. Despite finishing first in the Republican primary with 10,522 votes (24.7%), he did not clear the 35% necessary to avoid a nominating convention. At the convention, after five ballots, Zaun was defeated by David Young, who had come fifth in the primary with 6,604 votes (15.5%).

On July 4, Zaun voiced his disappointment and suggested he would leave the Republican Party, leading some to encourage him to run for the seat as an Independent. He had previously announced that he would introduce legislation to hold runoff primary elections instead of conventions. On July 10, Zaun announced that despite his frustrations, he would not leave the Republican Party or run as an Independent.

=== 2016 ===
Zaun was reelected to Iowa's 20th Senate District.

=== 2020 ===
Zaun was reelected to Iowa's 20th Senate District.

=== 2022 ===
The reapportionment that followed the 2020 United States Census resulted in Zaur being assigned to Iowa's 22nd Senate District for the final two years of his term, starting in January 2023.

=== 2024 ===
In the 2024 Iowa Senate election, he was the incumbent and in Iowa's 22nd Senate District and was unseated by Democrat Matt Blake.

== Legal difficulties ==
On February 19, 2021, Zaun was found with a handgun at the Des Moines International Airport. The Des Moines Police Department confirmed that the gun was found on the Republican senator during his screening. Police said Zaun does have a permit to carry. Zaun was cited for violating Iowa ordinance 22-55.

Iowa Senate
Preceded by Jerry Behn	President pro tempore of the Iowa Senate; 2021–2025	Succeeded by Ken Rozenboom
