= Ron Corbett =

American politician (born 1960)

Mayor of Cedar Rapids
- In office January 2010 – January 2018
- Preceded by: Kay Halloran
- Succeeded by: Brad Hart

Speaker of the Iowa House of Representatives
- In office 1995–2000
- Preceded by: Harold Van Maanen
- Succeeded by: Brent Siegrist

Personal details
- Born: October 12, 1960 (age 65) Erie, Pennsylvania, U.S.
- Party: Republican
- Children: 5
- Education: Cornell College (BA)
- Website: Official website

Ron Corbett (born October 12, 1960) is an American politician and former mayor of Cedar Rapids, Iowa.

== Early life and education ==
Corbett was born in Erie, Pennsylvania, in 1960. In 1974, his family moved to Iowa and he later graduated from Cornell College in Mount Vernon, Iowa, in 1983.

== Career ==
After graduation, Corbett worked for The Equitable Life Insurance Company as an agent for ten years. In 1986 he was elected to the Iowa House of Representatives, where he served 7 terms. He was Speaker of the House from 1995 to 1999. He then resigned his House seat to become president of the Cedar Rapids Area Chamber of Commerce. He left that position for Cedar Rapids-based international trucking firm CRST, working directly under executive director John Smith.

He was elected mayor of Cedar Rapids in 2009 with 62% of the vote. He was reelected to another four-year term in 2013. In December 2016, he announced that he would not seek reelection for mayor of Cedar Rapids but would instead consider a run for the Republican nomination for governor of Iowa in 2018.

In 2015, he resigned from CRST and launched Engage Iowa, a conservative think tank of which he serves as president. Its first policy initiative, on water quality and state tax reform, was introduced in November 2015.

Ron Corbett	62.3%	14,642
Brian Fagan	35.7%	8,385
P.T Larson	1.8%	421

== See also ==
- List of mayors of Cedar Rapids, Iowa

Preceded by Kay Halloran	Mayor of Cedar Rapids; 2010–2018	Succeeded by Brad Hart
