= 2022 Iowa Secretary of State election =

- November 8, 2022
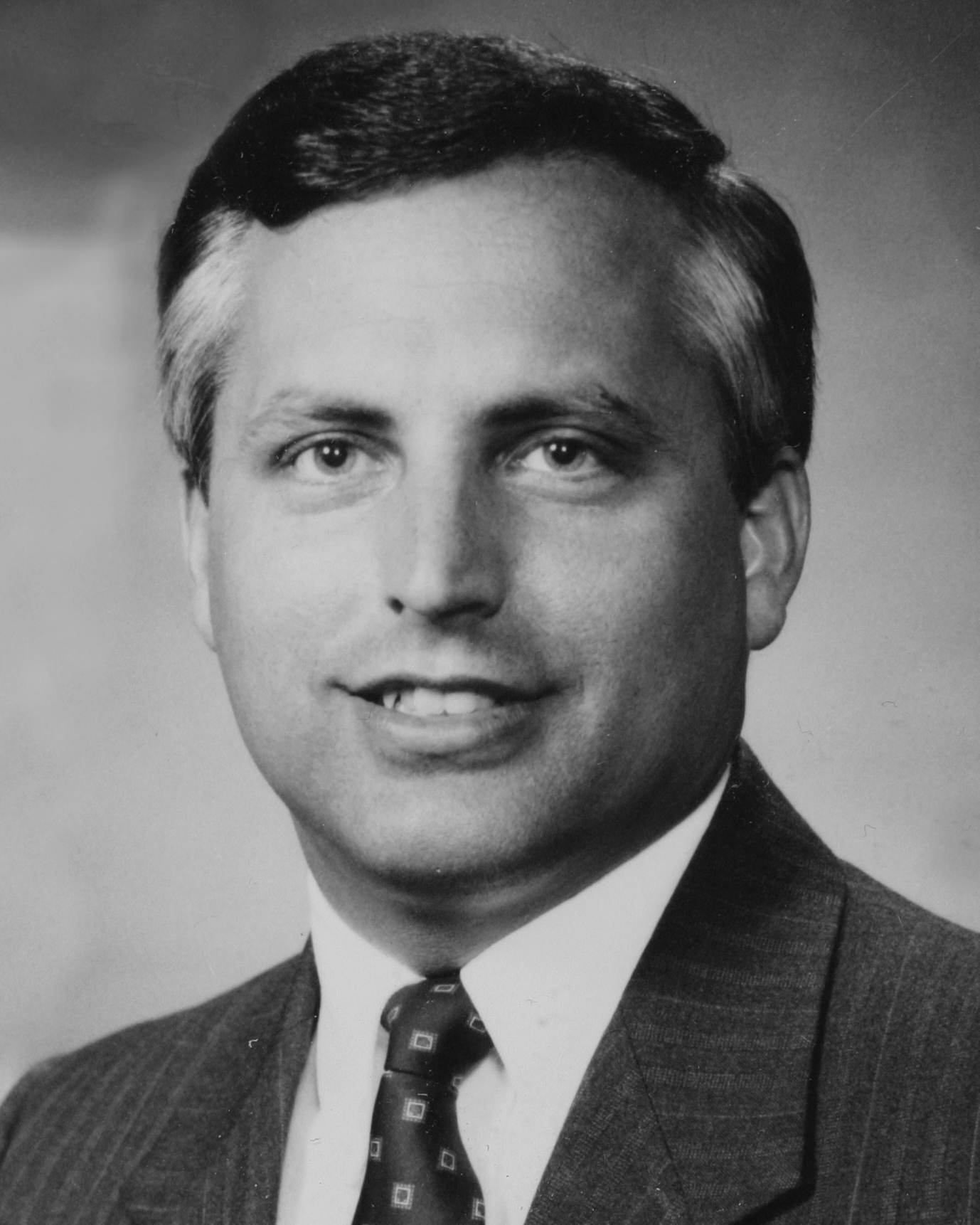

Nominee	Paul Pate	Joel Miller
Party	Republican	Democratic
Popular vote	723,250	480,474
Percentage	60.05%	39.88%
- Pate: 50–60% 60–70% 70–80% 80–90% >90% Miller: 40–50% 50–60% 60–70% 70–80% 80–90% >90% Tie: 50%
Secretary of State before election
Paul Pate
Republican
Elected Secretary of State
Paul Pate
Republican

The 2022 Iowa Secretary of State election was held on November 8, 2022, to elect the Secretary of State of Iowa. Incumbent Republican Paul Pate was re-elected, defeating Democratic opponent Joel Miller.

== Republican primary ==
=== Candidates ===
==== Declared ====
- Paul Pate, incumbent secretary of state

=== Results ===
Republican primary results
Party	Candidate	Votes	%
Republican	Paul D. Pate (incumbent)	174,513	99.68%
Write-in		567	0.32%
Total votes		175,080	100.00%

== Democratic primary ==
=== Candidates ===
==== Nominee ====
- Joel Miller, Linn County auditor

==== Eliminated in primary ====
- Eric Van Lancker, Clinton County auditor

=== Endorsements ===
Eric Van Lancker

U.S. Representatives

- Dave Loebsack, former U.S. Representative for Iowa's 2nd congressional district (2007–2021)

Governors

- Martin O'Malley, former Governor of Maryland (2007–2015)

=== Results ===
Results by county Miller: 50–60%; 60–70%; 70–80%; 80–90%; Van Lancker: 80–90%

Democratic primary results
Party	Candidate	Votes	%
Democratic	Joel Miller	98,049	71.57%
Democratic	Eric Van Lancker	38,646	28.21%
Write-in		294	0.21%
Total votes		136,989	100.00%

== General election ==
=== Predictions ===
Source	Ranking	As of
Sabato's Crystal Ball	Leans R	November 3, 2022
Elections Daily	Safe R	November 7, 2022

=== Results ===
2022 Iowa Secretary of State election
Party	Candidate	Votes	%	±%
Republican	Paul D. Pate (incumbent)	723,250	60.05%	+7.33%
Democratic	Joel Miller	480,474	39.88%	−4.99%
Write-in		708	0.06%	-0.02%
Total votes		1,204,432	100.00%	
Republican hold				

==== By congressional district ====
Pate won all four congressional districts.

District	Pate	Miller	Representative
1st	57%	43%	Mariannette Miller-Meeks
2nd	59%	41%	Ashley Hinson
3rd	56%	44%	Cindy Axne (117th Congress)
3rd	56%	44%	Zach Nunn (118th Congress)
4th	69%	31%	Randy Feenstra
