= Eric Giddens (politician) =

American politician

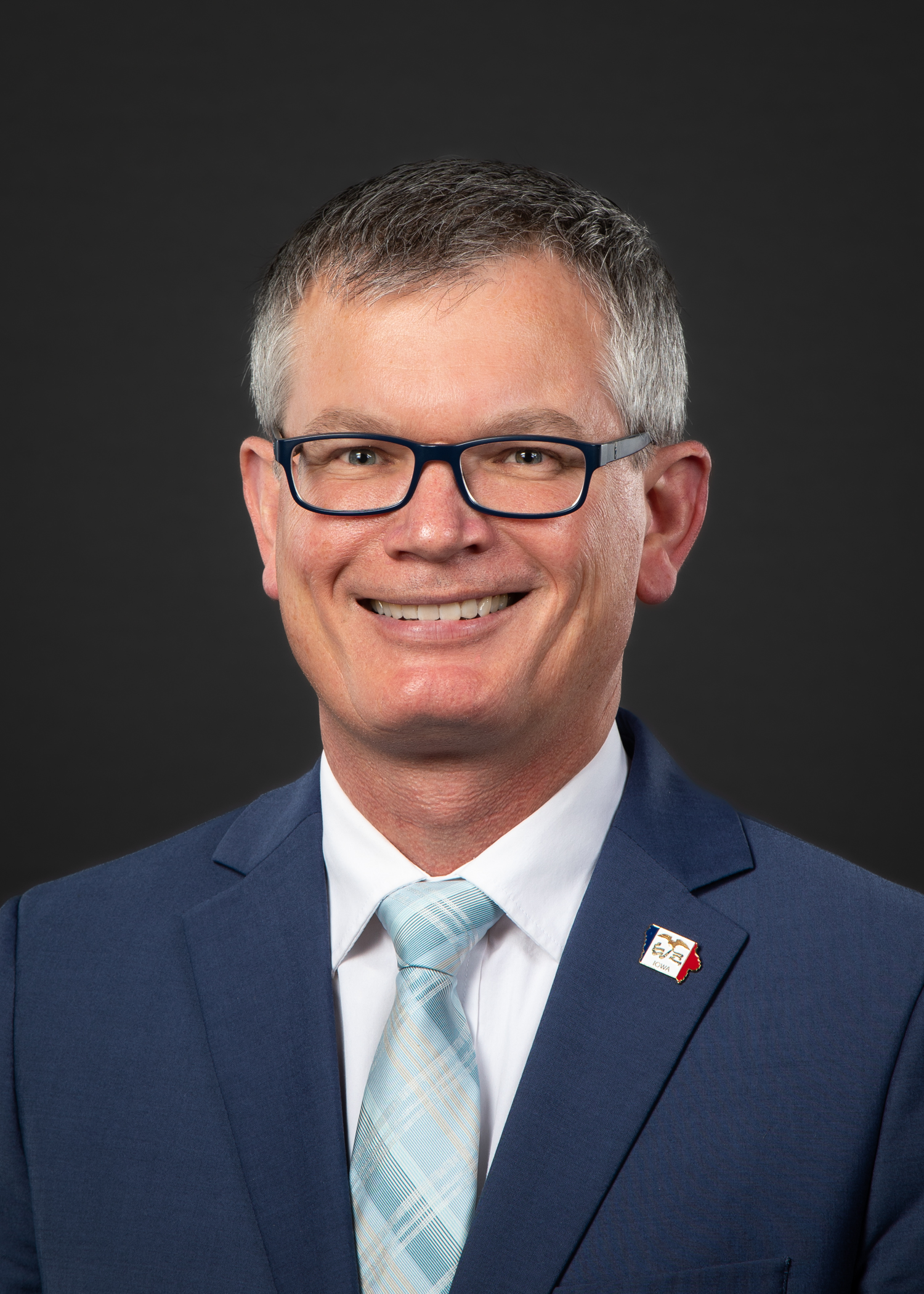

Member of the Iowa Senate from the 38th district
- Incumbent
- Assumed office March 25, 2019
- Preceded by: Jeff Danielson
- Constituency: District 38 - (2023-2025); District 30 - (2019-2023)

Personal details
- Born: November 9, 1973 (age 52)
- Party: Democratic

Eric Giddens (born November 9, 1973) is an American politician in the state of Iowa currently serving in the Iowa Senate as a member for the 38th District. A Democrat, he was elected to the Senate's 30th district defeating Republican Walt Rogers in a special election held on March 19, 2019, after incumbent senator Jeff Danielson resigned. Giddens was a member of the Cedar Falls, Iowa School Board and a program director at the University of Northern Iowa's Center for Energy and Environmental Education.

As of February 2020, Giddens serves on the following committees: Education, State Government, Transportation, Veterans Affairs, and Ways and Means. He also serves on the Tax Credit Review Committee, as well as the Education Commission of the States, and the Research and Development School Advisory Council.

Iowa Senate
Preceded by Dawn Driscoll	38th District; 2023 – present	Succeeded by Incumbent
Preceded by Jeff Danielson	30th District; 2019 – 2023	Succeeded by Waylon Brown
