= Mark Lofgren =

American politician (born 1961)

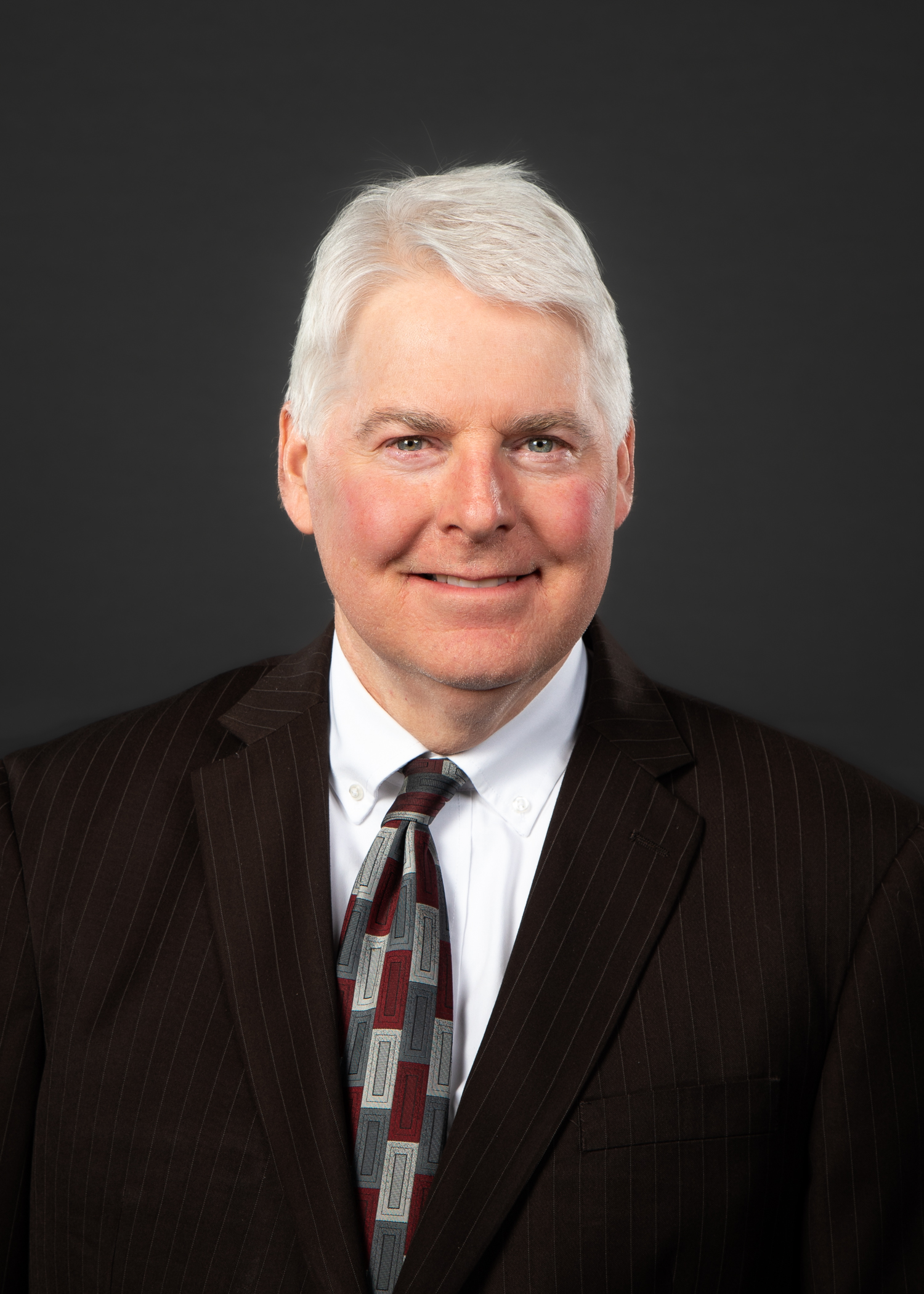

Member of the Iowa Senate from the 48th district
- Incumbent
- Assumed office January 9, 2017
- Preceded by: Chris Brase
- Constituency: District 48 - (2023-Present); District 46 - (2017-2023)

Member of the Iowa House of Representatives from the 91st district
- In office January 10, 2011 – January 11, 2015
- Preceded by: Nathan Reichert
- Succeeded by: Gary Carlson

Personal details
- Born: June 26, 1961 (age 65) Muscatine, Iowa, U.S.
- Party: Republican
- Spouse: Paula
- Children: Four
- Education: Muscatine Community College (AA); University of Iowa (BBA)
- Profession: Residential and commercial real estate sales
- Website: legis.iowa.gov/...

Mark Lofgren (born June 26, 1961) is a member of the Iowa Senate, representing the 46th district. He was elected in 2016, defeating incumbent Democratic Senator Chris Brase.

He previously served as a member of the Iowa House of Representatives from 2011-2015 before giving up his seat for an unsuccessful bid for the Republican candidate for the Iowa's 2nd congressional district

== Electoral history ==
Election	Political result	Candidate	Party	Votes	%
Iowa House of Representatives elections, 2010; District 80; Turnout: 9,488	Republican gain from Democratic	Mark Lofgren	Republican	5,458	57.53%
Iowa House of Representatives elections, 2010; District 80; Turnout: 9,488	Republican gain from Democratic	Nathan Reichert*	Democratic	4,014	42.31%
Iowa House of Representatives elections, 2010; District 80; Turnout: 9,488	Republican gain from Democratic	Write-In		16	0.17%
Iowa House of Representatives elections, 2012; District 91; Turnout: 13,958	Republican hold	Mark Lofgren*	Republican	7,426	53.20%
Iowa House of Representatives elections, 2012; District 91; Turnout: 13,958	Republican hold	John Dabeet	Democratic	6,511	46.65%
Iowa House of Representatives elections, 2012; District 91; Turnout: 13,958	Republican hold	Write-In		21	0.15%
United States House of Representatives Republican primary election, 2014; District 2 Turnout: 30,475	Republican	Mariannette Miller-Meeks	Republican	15,043	49.36%
United States House of Representatives Republican primary election, 2014; District 2 Turnout: 30,475	Republican	Mark Lofgren	Republican	11,634	38.18%
United States House of Representatives Republican primary election, 2014; District 2 Turnout: 30,475	Republican	Matthew Waldren	Republican	3,746	12.29%
United States House of Representatives Republican primary election, 2014; District 2 Turnout: 30,475	Republican	Write-In	Republican	52	0.17%
Iowa State Senate elections, 2016; District 46; Turnout: 29,230	Republican gain from Democratic	Mark Lofgren	Republican	16,576	56.71%
Iowa State Senate elections, 2016; District 46; Turnout: 29,230	Republican gain from Democratic	Chris Brase*	Democratic	12,615	43.16%
Iowa State Senate elections, 2016; District 46; Turnout: 29,230	Republican gain from Democratic	Write-In		39	0.13%

Iowa Senate
Preceded by Dan Zumbach	48th District; 2023 – present	Succeeded by Incumbent
Preceded by Chris Brase	46th District; 2017 – 2023	Succeeded by Dawn Driscoll
Iowa House of Representatives
Preceded by Dave Heaton	91st District; 2013 – 2015	Succeeded by Gary Carlson
Preceded by Nathan Reichert	80th District; 2011 – 2013	Succeeded by Larry Sheets
