= Paul Pate =

28th and 32nd Secretary of State of Iowa

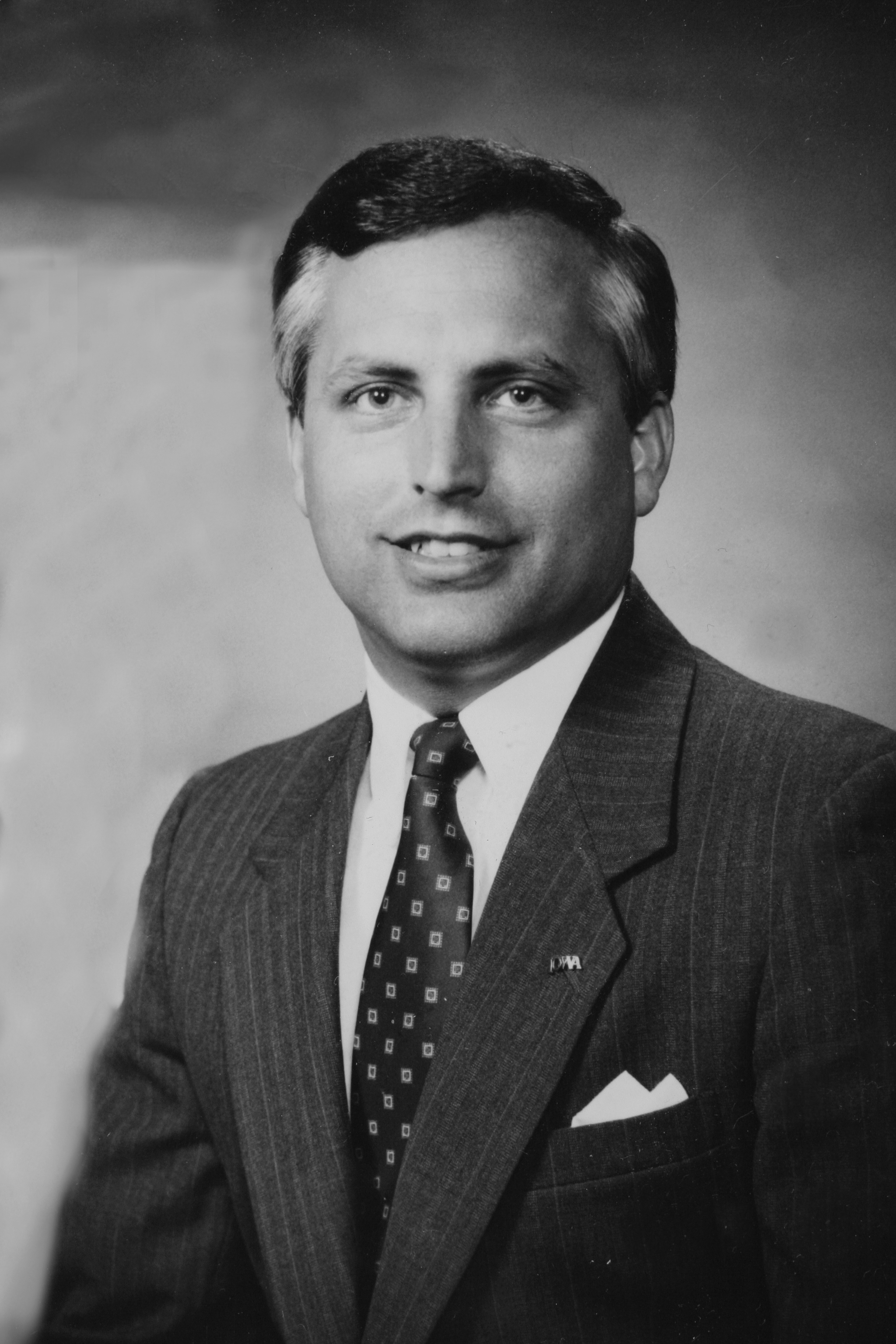
- Pate in 1991

28th and 32nd Secretary of State of Iowa
- Incumbent
- Assumed office January 1, 2015
- Governor: Terry Branstad; Kim Reynolds; Rob Sand (elect)
- Preceded by: Matt Schultz
- In office January 3, 1995 – January 3, 1999
- Governor: Terry Branstad
- Preceded by: Elaine Baxter
- Succeeded by: Chet Culver

Mayor of Cedar Rapids
- In office January 1, 2002 – January 1, 2006
- Preceded by: Lee Clancey
- Succeeded by: Kay Halloran

Member of the Iowa Senate from the 26th district
- In office January 1, 1993 – January 3, 1995
- Preceded by: Richard Running
- Succeeded by: Mary Lundby

Member of the Iowa Senate from the 24th district
- In office January 1, 1989 – January 1, 1993
- Preceded by: Hurley Hall
- Succeeded by: Richard F. Drake

Personal details
- Born: Paul Danny Pate Jr. May 1, 1958 (age 68) Ottumwa, Iowa, U.S.
- Party: Republican
- Spouse: Jane Pate
- Children: 3
- Education: Kirkwood Community College (AA)

Paul Danny Pate Jr. (born May 1, 1958) is an American businessman and politician serving as the 32nd Secretary of State of Iowa since 2015, previously holding the office from 1995 to 1999. Pate is the past president of the National Association of Secretaries of State. A member of the Republican Party, he was also in the Iowa Senate from 1989 to 1993 and Mayor of Cedar Rapids from 2002 to 2006. He was an unsuccessful candidate for his party's nomination for Governor of Iowa in 1998.

== Early and personal life ==
Pate was born in 1958 to parents Paul Sr. and Velma Pate. He received an Associate of Arts degree from Kirkwood Community College. He married his wife Jane in 1978. They have three children, Jennifer, Amber and Paul III, and five grandchildren.

== Business career ==
Pate, a third-generation builder, is the president and owner of Pate Asphalt. He was also previously the president of Premier Group Corporation, and the president of Pavco Paving Company. Pate was a member of U.S. Small Business Administration District Advisory Board from 1987 to 1989. He previously served as executive director for the Youth Entrepreneurship Program of East Central Iowa. He has been recognized as Iowa Young Entrepreneur of the Year by the U.S. Small Business Administration, with a Blue Chip Award by the United States Chamber of Commerce, and an Outstanding Community Leader by The Des Moines Register.

== Political career ==
Pate was first elected to the Iowa Senate in 1988 for the 24th district. He was reelected in 1992 for the 26th district. Both districts were in Linn County. He ran for Secretary of State of Iowa in 1994 and was unopposed in the Republican primary. In the general election, he defeated Democrat Anne Pedersen, the Lee County Auditor, by 473,371 votes (51.73%) to 425,626 (46.51%).

He did not run for reelection in 1998, instead running for the Republican nomination for Governor of Iowa. Incumbent Republican governor Terry Branstad chose not to run for a fifth term, so the seat was open. Pate came third out of three candidates in the Republican primary, with 13,299 votes (8.19%), behind telecommunications executive and Branstad's Chief of Staff David A. Oman, who took 35,402 votes (21.80%), and former U.S. Representative and 1996 Senate nominee Jim Ross Lightfoot, who won with 113,499 votes (69.89%). Lightfoot went on to lose the general election to Democratic state senator Tom Vilsack.

In 2001, Pate ran for Mayor of Cedar Rapids, Iowa, winning the officially non-partisan election with 20,210 votes (54.93%) to three-term incumbent Democratic mayor Lee Clancey's 16,450 votes (44.71%). Pate ran for reelection in 2003 and defeated Paul T. Larson by 26,001 votes (76%) to 7,463 (21.81%). He was an advocate of strong-mayor form of city government and chose not to run for reelection in 2005 after a city referendum backed a weak-mayor form of government instead. He then returned to running Pate Asphalt in Marion, Iowa.

On January 18, 2010, Pate filed paperwork to notify the Iowa Election Board that he was considering a run for his former position as Iowa Secretary of State against Democratic incumbent Michael Mauro. He was reportedly intrigued at the idea of being able to run for office alongside former Iowa Governor Terry Branstad. However, he decided not to run for the office. He did however decide to run four years later after Republican incumbent Matt Schultz instead ran unsuccessfully for the Republican nomination for Iowa's 3rd congressional district. Pate was unopposed in the Republican primary and faced Democrat Brad Anderson in the 2014 general election. Pate defeated Anderson 49% to 47%, returning to the office of Iowa Secretary of State 20 years after he was first elected to the position.

Upon returning to the Secretary of State's office, Pate set out to institute a Safe at Home program in Iowa. Safe at Home is an address confidentiality program for survivors of domestic violence, sexual abuse, trafficking and stalking. The bill passed both chambers of the Iowa Legislature unanimously and was signed into law by Governor Terry Branstad in May 2015. Secretary Pate's Office administers the program.

Paul Pate was selected to participate in the prestigious 2015 Toll Fellowship Program. It is a leadership development program for state government officials, bringing 48 of the nation’s top officials from all three branches of state government together for an intensive six-day intellectual boot camp. Google awarded Secretary Pate in July 2015 for his efforts to increase voter participation in Iowa. The award was presented during the National Association of Secretaries of State's annual conference.

Secretary Pate was named the co-chair of the National Association of Secretaries of State’s Standing Committee on Business Services in July 2015. Pate was named the co-chair of the NASS Business ID Theft Task Force in March 2016. Secretary Pate was elected the Midwestern Region Vice-president of the National Association of Secretaries of State in July 2016, Treasurer for NASS in 2017 and was unanimously chosen as President-Elect for NASS in July 2018.

Secretary Pate's Office partnered with the Iowa Department of Transportation to launch online voter registration in Iowa on January 1, 2016. Approximately 70,000 Iowans utilized the system to register to vote in 2016. Iowa continually broke voter registration records during Secretary Pate's current tenure, reaching an all-time high of 2,045,864 active registered voters in January 2017.

Pate's efforts in voter education for Iowa's youth were recognized in March 2017 when he was named the winner of the National State Boards of Education Award for Outstanding Leadership in Voter Education. Pate was rewarded for his efforts in conducting two statewide Iowa Youth Straw Polls and the Iowa Youth Caucus, which included hundreds of schools and tens of thousands of student participants. Pate was the recipient of the Election Center's 2018 Professional Practice State Award for his office's training materials for poll workers.

The Council of State Governments appointed Secretary Pate to its Executive Committee and International Committee in 2017. CSG cited Pate's commitment to advancing the efforts of the council’s Overseas Voting Initiative, designed to improve the return rate of overseas absentee ballots from service members and U.S. citizens living abroad.

Paul Pate was reelected as Iowa's Secretary of State in November 2018, defeating Democratic challenger Deidre DeJear by eight points.

Secretary Pate received the National Association of Secretaries of State's 2019 IDEAS Award for his election cybersecurity initiative, "Partnerships Pay Dividends: A Roadmap to Election Cybersecurity". Pate partnered with various of county, state and federal agencies to provide free cybersecurity services to all 99 Iowa counties. Pate was also recognized by the U.S. Election Assistance Commission for a "Clearie" Award for his efforts to help veterans and Iowans with disabilities vote.

The National Association of Secretaries of State unanimously chose Paul Pate to be their President during the organization's 2019 summer conference.

Pate was reelected in a landslide in 2022, earning more than 60 percent of the vote and winning by a margin of over 20 points.

== Controversies ==
On January 15, 2019, Paul Pate announced that he failed to fulfill his constitutional duty regarding proposed constitutional amendments. The Iowa Constitution mandates that the Secretary of State must notify the public of any amendment proposals for three months prior to a general election and follow any other prescribed statutes which are currently delineated in the Iowa Code, which further mandates that the Secretary of State must publish the amendment proposal in two newspapers in each of Iowa's four congressional districts. Through bureaucratic error, Pate did not initiate this process, causing two constitutional amendment proposals which were passed by the 87th Iowa Legislature in 2018 to effectively be pocket vetoed. The first amendment proposal was to clarify the succession of the Iowa governor and lieutenant governor in the event of the governor's death, impeachment or resignation. The second amendment proposal was to add a right to keep and bear arms provision to the constitution. The error generated considerable backlash from Second Amendment advocates.

== Electoral history ==
Iowa State Senate 24th District Republican Primary Election, 1988
Party	Candidate	Votes	%
Republican	Paul Pate	1,167	59.09
Republican	Chris Keleher	808	40.91

Iowa State Senate 24th District Election, 1988
Party	Candidate	Votes	%
Republican	Paul Pate	12,640	51.34
Democratic	Ralph Kremer	11,980	48.66

Iowa State Senate 26th District Election, 1992
Party	Candidate	Votes	%
Republican	Paul Pate	17,854	60.12
Democratic	Sylvia Kelley	11,843	39.88

Iowa Secretary of State Election, 1994
Party	Candidate	Votes	%
Republican	Paul Pate	473,371	51.58
Democratic	Anne Pedersen	428,626	46.70
Natural Law	Steven Druker	15,809	1.72

Iowa Secretary of State Election, 2014
Party	Candidate	Votes	%
Republican	Paul Pate	529,275	48.46
Democratic	Brad Anderson	509,202	46.63
Libertarian	Jake Porter	32,889	3.01
New Independent Party Iowa	Spencer Highland	19,945	1.83
Write-ins	Write-ins	769	0.07

Election	Political result	Candidate	Party	Votes	%
2018 Iowa Secretary of State Election; Turnout: 1,300,917	Republican hold	Paul Pate	Republican	685,780	52.71%
2018 Iowa Secretary of State Election; Turnout: 1,300,917	Republican hold	Deidre Dejear	Democratic	583,774	44.87%
2018 Iowa Secretary of State Election; Turnout: 1,300,917	Republican hold	Jules Ofenbakh	Libertarian	30,881	2.37%
2018 Iowa Secretary of State Election; Turnout: 1,300,917	Republican hold	Write-In		482	0.04%

Election	Political result	Candidate	Party	Votes	%
2022 Iowa Secretary of State Election; Turnout: 1,203,969	Republican hold	Paul Pate	Republican	723,084	60.06%
2022 Iowa Secretary of State Election; Turnout: 1,203,969	Republican hold	Joel Miller	Democratic	480,178	39.88%
2022 Iowa Secretary of State Election; Turnout: 1,203,969	Republican hold	Write-In		707	0.06%

== See also ==
- List of mayors of Cedar Rapids, Iowa

Party political offices
Preceded by Beverly Anderson	Republican nominee for Secretary of State of Iowa; 1994	Succeeded by John Gilliland
Preceded by Matt Schultz	Republican nominee for Secretary of State of Iowa; 2014, 2018, 2022, 2026	Most recent
Iowa Senate
Preceded by Hurley Hall	Member of the Iowa Senate from the 24th district 1989–1993	Succeeded by Richard F. Drake
Preceded by Richard Running	Member of the Iowa Senate from the 26th district 1993–1995	Succeeded by Mary Lundby
Political offices
Preceded by Elaine Baxter	Secretary of State of Iowa; 1995–1999	Succeeded by Chet Culver
Preceded by Lee Clancey	Mayor of Cedar Rapids; 2002–2006	Succeeded by Kay Halloran
Preceded by Matt Schultz	Secretary of State of Iowa; 2015–present	Incumbent
