= Dawn Driscoll =

Iowa politician

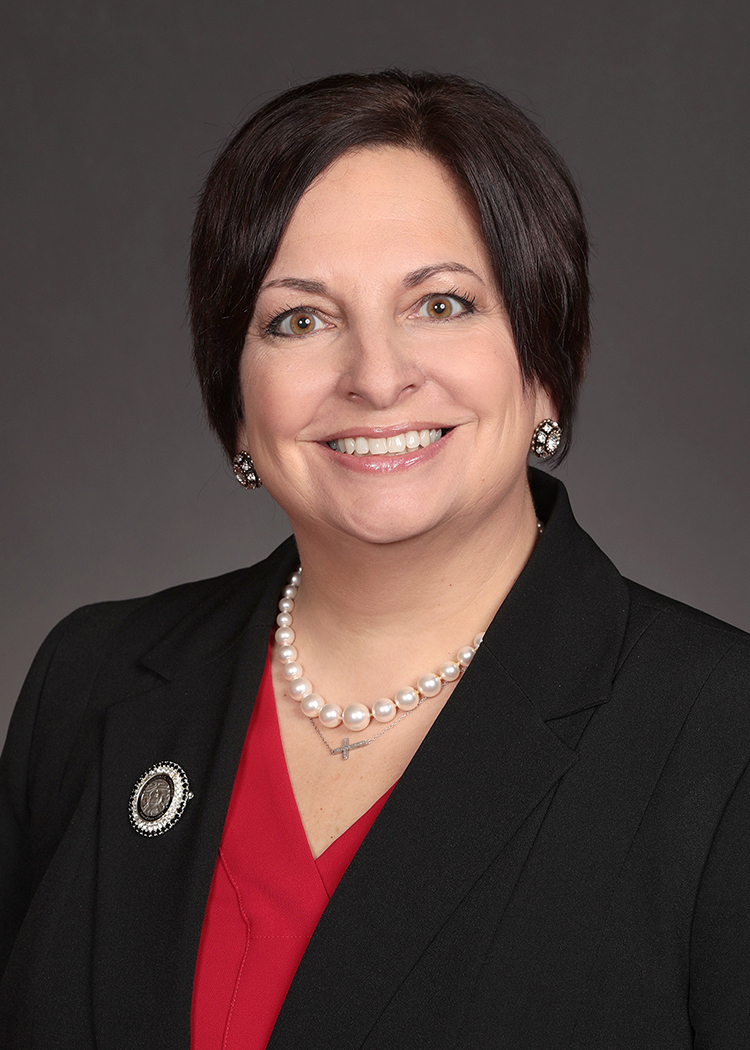

Member of the Iowa Senate from the 46th district
- Incumbent
- Assumed office January 11, 2021
- Preceded by: Tim Kapucian
- Constituency: District 46 - (2023-Present); District 38 - (2021-2023)

Personal details
- Born: 1978 (age 47–48) Atkinson, Illinois, U.S.
- Party: Republican
- Children: 3
- Education: Western Illinois University (BS)
- Profession: Farmer

Dawn Driscoll is an American politician and farmer serving as a member of the Iowa Senate from the 46th district. Elected in November 2020, she assumed office on January 11, 2021.

== Early life and education ==
Driscoll was born in Atkinson, Illinois. She earned a Bachelor of Science degree in agronomy from Western Illinois University.

== Career ==
A sixth-generation farmer, Driscoll has previously worked as a recruiter for Hummer AgriBusiness Search. She was also the president of the Iowa County, Iowa Farm Bureau. Driscoll was elected to the Iowa Senate in November 2020 and assumed office on January 11, 2021. Driscoll is the chair of the Senate Agriculture Committee.

Iowa Senate
Preceded by Mark Lofgren	46th District; 2023 – present	Succeeded by Incumbent
Preceded by Tim Kapucian	38th District; 2021 – 2023	Succeeded by Eric Giddens
