= 1964 Iowa Senate election =

- November 3, 1964

39 out of 59 seats in the Iowa State Senate 30 seats needed for a majority
	Majority party	Minority party
Leader	Andrew G. Frommelt	Robert R. Rigler
Party	Democratic	Republican
Leader's seat	32nd	44th
Last election	12	38
Seats after	34	25
Seat change	▲22 (Note: In 1964, the size of the Iowa state Senate increased from 50 to 59 seats.)	▼13
Majority Leader before election
Robert R. Rigler
Republican
Elected Majority Leader
Andrew G. Frommelt
Democratic

The 1964 Iowa State Senate elections took place as part of the biennial 1964 United States elections. Iowa voters elected state senators in 39 of the state senate's 59 districts. At that time, the Iowa Senate still had several multi-member districts. State senators serve four-year terms in the Iowa State Senate.

The Iowa Senate was expanded from 50 to 59 members and new district maps were drawn for the 1964 election. The Iowa General Assembly provides statewide maps of each district. To compare the effect of the 1964 redistricting process on the location of each district, contrast the previous map with the map used for 1964 elections.

The primary election on June 1, 1964, determined which candidates appeared on the November 3, 1964 general election ballot.

Following the previous election, Republicans had control of the Iowa state Senate with 38 seats to Democrats' 12 seats.

To claim control of the chamber from Republicans, the Democrats needed to net 18 Senate seats.

Democrats flipped control of the Iowa State Senate following the 1964 general election with the balance of power shifting to Democrats holding 34 seats and Republicans having 25 seats (a net gain of 22 seats for Democrats and net loss of 13 seats for Republicans).

== Summary of Results ==
- Note: The 20 holdover Senators not up for re-election are listed here with asterisks (*).

State Senate District	Incumbent	Party	Incoming Senator	Party
1st	Seeley G. Lodwick	Rep	Seeley G. Lodwick*	Rep
2nd	Dewey Blake Phelps	Rep	Max E. Reno	Dem
3rd	Joe N. Wilson	Rep	Don S. McGill	Dem
4th	Howard Vincent	Rep	Franklin S. Main (Note: Redistricted from district 5 to 4.)	Dem
5th	Franklin S. Main	Dem	James E. Briles	Rep
6th (Note: The 6th transitioned from a 2- to 1-member district.)	Orval C. Walter	Dem	Charles Vernon "Vern" Lisle*	Rep
6th	Charles Vernon "Vern" Lisle	Rep	Charles Vernon "Vern" Lisle*	Rep
7th	Robert R. Dodds	Dem	Robert R. Dodds*	Dem
8th (Note: The 8th transitioned from a 2- to 1-member district.)	Clifford M. Vance	Rep	Clifford M. Vance*	Rep
8th	Edward Anderson Wearin	Rep	Clifford M. Vance*	Rep
9th	Jacob B. "Jake" Mincks	Dem	Jacob B. "Jake" Mincks*	Dem
10th	Richard Lytle Stephens	Rep	Richard Lytle Stephens*	Rep
11th	J. Louis Fisher	Rep	Bass Van Gilst	Dem
12th	Vacant		Stanley Heaberlin	Dem
13th	Vacant		Joseph B. Flatt (Note: Redistricted from district 16 to 13.)	Rep
14th (Note: The 14th transitioned from a 2- to 1-member district.)	John L. Campbell	Rep	John David Shoeman*	Rep
14th	John David Shoeman	Rep	John David Shoeman*	Rep
15th	Vera H. Shivvers	Rep	Gilbert E. Klefstad	Dem
16th	Joseph B. Flatt	Rep	David M. Stanley	Rep
17th	Harry L. Cowden	Rep	Joseph W. Cassidy	Dem
17th	Jack Schroeder	Rep	Jack Schroeder*	Rep
18th	David O. Shaff	Rep	David O. Shaff*	Rep
19th	Richard C. Turner	Rep	Howard Tabor	Dem
20th	Vacant		John M. Ely	Dem
20th	Vacant		Tom Riley	Rep
21st	Vacant		Robert J. Burns	Dem
22nd	Robert Orville Burrows	Rep	Robert Orville Burrows*	Rep
23rd (Note: The 23rd transitioned from a 2- to 1-member district.)	Kenneth Benda	Rep	Kenneth Benda*	Rep
23rd	David Earl Elijah	Rep	Kenneth Benda*	Rep
24th	Jans T. Dykhouse	Rep	Max Milo Mills	Rep
25th (Note: The 25th transitioned from a 2- to 1-member district.)	Eugene Marshall Hill	Dem	Eugene Marshall Hill*	Dem
25th	Daniel Clifford "D. C." Nolan	Rep	Eugene Marshall Hill*	Dem
26th	Martin Wiley	Rep	Daryl Hallett Nims	Dem
27th (Note: The 27th transitioned from a 2- to 3-member district.)	C. Joseph Coleman	Dem	Howard Reppert	Dem
27th	George E. O'Malley	Dem	George E. O'Malley*	Dem
27th	Newly created subdistrict		William F. Denman	Dem
28th	Howard C. Buck	Rep	Warren J. Kruck	Dem
29th	Vacant		Alan Shirley	Dem
30th	Peter F. Hansen	Dem	Peter F. Hansen*	Dem
31st (Note: The 31st transitioned from a 2- to 1-member district.)	Charles F. Griffin	Rep	Charles F. Griffin*	Rep
31st	Alvin V. Doran	Rep	Charles F. Griffin*	Rep
32nd (Note: The 32nd transitioned from a 2- to 1-member district.)	Andrew G. Frommelt	Dem	Andrew G. Frommelt*	Dem
32nd	Charles S. Van Eaton	Rep	Andrew G. Frommelt*	Dem
33rd	Irving D. Long	Rep	John W. Patton	Dem
34th (Note: The 34th transitioned from a 1- to 2-member district.)	Robert D. Fulton	Dem	Gene F. Condon	Dem
34th	Newly created subdistrict		Francis LaVern Messerly	Rep
35th	John A. Walker	Rep	John A. Walker*	Rep
36th	Adolph W. Elvers	Dem	C. Joseph Coleman (Note: Redistricted from district 27 to 36.)	Dem
37th	Donald G. Beneke	Rep	Donald G. Beneke*	Rep
38th	Vacant		J. Henry Lucken (Note: Redistricted from district 46 to 38.)	Rep
39th (Note: The 39th transitioned from a 1- to 2-member district.)	Vernon Kyhl	Rep	Vincent S. Burke	Dem
39th	Newly created subdistrict		James M. McNally	Dem
40th	George Lindsey Scott	Rep	Adolph W. Elvers (Note: Redistricted from district 36 to 40.)	Dem
41st	Jacob Grimstead	Rep	Hilarius Louis "H.L." Heying	Dem
42nd	Vacant		Vernon Kyhl (Note: Redistricted from district 39 to 42.)	Rep
43rd	Leigh Raymond Curran	Rep	Raymond W. "R. W." Hagie	Rep
44th	Robert R. Rigler	Rep	Robert R. Rigler*	Rep
45th	Leo Elthon	Rep	Leo Elthon*	Rep
46th	J. Henry Lucken	Rep	Delbert W. Floy	Dem
47th	LeRoy Getting	Rep	John Leonard Buren	Dem
48th	Vacant		Jack Kibbie	Dem
49th	John J. Brown	Dem	H. Kenneth Nurse	Dem
50th	Vacant		Lucas DeKoster	Rep
51st (Note: The 51st district was newly created following redistricting.)	Newly created district		Merle W. Hagedorn	Dem
52nd (Note: The 52nd district was newly created following redistricting.)	Newly created district		Elmer F. Lange	Rep
53rd (Note: The 53rd district was newly created following redistricting.)	Newly created district		Donald W. Murray	Dem

== Detailed Results ==
- 39 of the 59 Iowa Senate seats were up for election in 1964. (Note: Multi-member districts in the electoral map of 1964 elections were: 17th with 2 seats; 20th with 2 seats; 27th with 3 seats; 34th with 2 seats; and, 39th with 2 seats. Remember, in 1964, multi-member districts still existed in the Iowa Senate.)
- Note: If a district does not list a primary, then that district did not have a competitive primary (i.e., there may have only been one candidate file for that district).

=== District 2 ===
Iowa Senate, District 2 Republican Primary Election, 1964
Party	Candidate	Votes	%
Republican	Joe N. Wilson (incumbent) (Note: Redistricted from district 3 to 2.)	2,164	58.6
Republican	William C. Ray	1,531	41.4
Total votes		3,695	100.0

Iowa Senate, District 2 General Election, 1964
Party	Candidate	Votes	%
Democratic	Max E. Reno	8,789	55.3
Republican	Joe N. Wilson (incumbent)	7,102	44.7
Total votes		15,891	100.0
Democratic gain from Republican			

=== District 3 ===
Iowa Senate, District 3 Republican Primary Election, 1964
Party	Candidate	Votes	%
Republican	Howard Vincent (incumbent) (Note: Redistricted from district 4 to 3.)	1,668	50.1
Republican	Marion M. Coons	1,660	49.9
Total votes		3,328	100.0

Iowa Senate, District 3 General Election, 1964
Party	Candidate	Votes	%
Democratic	Don S. McGill	7,673	53.2
Republican	Howard Vincent (incumbent)	6,748	46.8
Total votes		14,421	100.0
Democratic gain from Republican			

=== District 4 ===
Iowa Senate, District 4 General Election, 1964
Party	Candidate	Votes	%
Democratic	Franklin S. Main (incumbent)	8,984	62.2
Republican	Joseph G. Knock	5,463	37.8
Total votes		14,447	100.0
Democratic gain from Republican			

=== District 5 ===
Iowa Senate, District 5 Republican Primary Election, 1964
Party	Candidate	Votes	%
Republican	James E. Briles	1,781	43.2
Republican	Willis A. McAlpin	1,173	28.5
Republican	Edward A. Wearin (incumbent) (Note: Redistricted from district 8 to 5.)	1,165	28.3
Total votes		4,119	100.0

Iowa Senate, District 5 General Election, 1964
Party	Candidate	Votes	%
Republican	James E. Briles	7,567	52.9
Democratic	Orval C. Walter (incumbent) (Note: Redistricted from district 6 to 5.)	6,744	47.1
Total votes		14,311	100.0
Republican gain from Democratic			

=== District 11 ===
Iowa Senate, District 11 General Election, 1964
Party	Candidate	Votes	%
Democratic	Bass Van Gilst	8,952	54.4
Republican	John L. Campbell (incumbent) (Note: Redistricted from district 14 to 11.)	7,519	45.6
Total votes		16,471	100.0
Democratic gain from Republican			

=== District 12 ===
Iowa Senate, District 12 Republican Primary Election, 1964
Party	Candidate	Votes	%
Republican	Vera H. Shivvers (incumbent) (Note: Redistricted from district 15 to 12.)	2,336	64.9
Republican	George D. Fischer	1,265	35.1
Total votes		3,601	100.0

Iowa Senate, District 12 General Election, 1964
Party	Candidate	Votes	%
Democratic	Stanley Heaberlin	12,020	56.4
Republican	Vera H. Shivvers (incumbent)	9,243	43.4
Independent	Harold Lee McClintic	50	0.2
Total votes		21,313	100.0

=== District 13 ===
Iowa Senate, District 13 General Election, 1964
Party	Candidate	Votes	%
Republican	Joseph B. Flatt (incumbent)	7,337	51.8
Democratic	Stanley E. Steele	6,818	48.2
Total votes		14,155	100.0

=== District 15 ===
Iowa Senate, District 15 Democratic Primary Election, 1964
Party	Candidate	Votes	%
Democratic	Gilbert E. Klefstad	1,418	58.4
Democratic	John V. Stubblefield	1,011	41.6
Total votes		2,429	100.0

Iowa Senate, District 15 General Election, 1964
Party	Candidate	Votes	%
Democratic	Gilbert E. Klefstad	16,093	52.4
Republican	Richard C. Turner (incumbent) (Note: Redistricted from district 19 to 15.)	14,625	47.6
Total votes		30,718	100.0
Democratic gain from Republican			

=== District 16 ===
Iowa Senate, District 16 General Election, 1964
Party	Candidate	Votes	%
Republican	David Stanley	12,381	59.7
Democratic	Herschel Flater	8,350	40.3
Total votes		20,731	100.0
Republican hold			

=== District 17 ===
- The 17th remained a 2-member district following the 1964 election. Subdistrict No. 1 held an election; however, Subdistrict No. 2 had a holdover Senator.

Iowa Senate, District 17 Subdistrict No. 1 General Election, 1964
Party	Candidate	Votes	%
Democratic	Joseph W. Cassidy	26,083	54.1
Republican	Riley Dietz	21,965	45.5
Independent	William A. Dare, Sr.	190	0.4
Total votes		48,238	100.0
Democratic hold			

=== District 19 ===
Iowa Senate, District 19 General Election, 1964
Party	Candidate	Votes	%
Democratic	Howard Tabor	8,746	55.2
Republican	Roy A. Miller	7,099	44.8
Total votes		15,845	100.0
Democratic gain from Republican			

=== District 20 ===
- The 20th was a 2-member district following the 1964 election. Subdistrict No. 1 held an election for a four-year term; whereas, Subdistrict No. 2 held an election for a two-year term.

Iowa Senate, District 20 Subdistrict No. 1 General Election, 1964
Party	Candidate	Votes	%
Democratic	John M. Ely, Jr.	35,664	59.6
Republican	Martin Wiley (incumbent) (Note: Redistricted from district 26 to 20.)	24,184	40.4
Total votes		59,848	100.0

Iowa Senate, District 20 Subdistrict No. 2 General Election, 1964
Party	Candidate	Votes	%
Republican	Tom Riley	30,688	51.2
Democratic	Howard Morton	29,295	48.8
Total votes		59,983	100.0

=== District 21 ===
Iowa Senate, District 21 Democratic Primary Election, 1964
Party	Candidate	Votes	%
Democratic	Robert J. Burns	2,533	49.8
Democratic	Scott Swisher	1,300	25.6
Democratic	Don McComas	878	17.3
Democratic	William L. Meardon	373	7.3
Total votes		5,084	100.0

Iowa Senate, District 21 General Election, 1964
Party	Candidate	Votes	%
Democratic	Robert J. Burns	12,409	58.5
Republican	D. C. Nolan (incumbent) (Note: Redistricted from district 25 to 21.)	8,789	41.5
Total votes		21,198	100.0

=== District 24 ===
Iowa Senate, District 24 Republican Primary Election, 1964
Party	Candidate	Votes	%
Republican	Max Milo Mills	1,743	74.9
Republican	John Knudson	584	25.1
Total votes		2,327	100.0

Iowa Senate, District 24 General Election, 1964
Party	Candidate	Votes	%
Republican	Max Milo Mills	7,788	51.0
Democratic	Carroll Paul	7,494	49.0
Total votes		15,282	100.0
Republican hold			

=== District 26 ===
Iowa Senate, District 26 Republican Primary Election, 1964
Party	Candidate	Votes	%
Republican	William A. Singer	1,777	54.1
Republican	David A. Norris	1,013	30.8
Republican	Samuel H. Thompson	495	15.1
Total votes		3,285	100.0

Iowa Senate, District 26 General Election, 1964
Party	Candidate	Votes	%
Democratic	Daryl H. Nims	9,681	50.02
Republican	William A. Singer	9,675	49.98
Total votes		19,356	100.0
Democratic gain from Republican			

=== District 27 ===
- The 27th was a 3-member district following the 1964 election. Subdistrict No. 1 held an election for a four-year term. Subdistrict No. 2 had a holdover Senator . Subdistrict No. 3 held an election for a two-year term.

Iowa Senate, District 27 Subdistrict No. 1 General Election, 1964
Party	Candidate	Votes	%
Democratic	Howard C. Reppert, Jr.	68,894	65.6
Republican	Robert E. Dreher	35,673	33.9
Independent	Robert W. Kernes	557	0.5
Total votes		105,124	100.0

Iowa Senate, District 27 Subdistrict No. 3 General Election, 1964
Party	Candidate	Votes	%
Democratic	William F. Denman	65,023	61.5
Republican	Robert E. Mannheimer	39,976	37.8
Independent	Norman W. Richardson	693	0.7
Total votes		105,692	100.0

=== District 28 ===
Iowa Senate, District 28 Republican Primary Election, 1964
Party	Candidate	Votes	%
Republican	R. K. Richardson	2,073	64.4
Republican	John N. "Jack" Nystrom	1,148	35.6
Total votes		3,221	100.0

Iowa Senate, District 28 General Election, 1964
Party	Candidate	Votes	%
Democratic	Warren J. Kruck	8,101	50.7
Republican	R. K. Richardson	7,889	49.3
Total votes		15,990	100.0
Democratic gain from Republican			

=== District 29 ===
Iowa Senate, District 29 General Election, 1964
Party	Candidate	Votes	%
Democratic	Alan Shirley	9,675	58.5
Republican	Kingsley M. Clarke	6,868	41.5
Total votes		16,543	100.0

=== District 33 ===
Iowa Senate, District 33 Republican Primary Election, 1964
Party	Candidate	Votes	%
Republican	Kenneth L. Parker	2,262	54.0
Republican	Betty A. O'Brien	1,927	46.0
Total votes		4,189	100.0

Iowa Senate, District 33 General Election, 1964
Party	Candidate	Votes	%
Democratic	John W. Patton	8,813	54.9
Republican	Kenneth L. Parker	7,238	45.1
Total votes		16,051	100.0
Democratic gain from Republican			

=== District 34 ===
- The 34th was a 2-member district following the 1964 election. Subdistrict No. 1 held an election for a four-year term; however, Subdistrict No. 2 held a special election due to the resignation of holdover Senator Robert D. Fulton who was elected lieutenant governor in 1964.

Iowa Senate, District 34 Subdistrict No. 1 General Election, 1964
Party	Candidate	Votes	%
Democratic	Gene F. Condon	26,958	54.9
Republican	Willard R. Hansen	22,114	45.1
Total votes		49,072	100.0
Democratic hold			

Iowa Senate, District 34 Subdistrict No. 2 Special Election, 1964
Party	Candidate	Votes	%
Republican	Francis Messerly	8,913	51.3
Democratic	Frederick G. White	8,342	48.1
Independent	Ernest J. Seeman	107	0.6
Total votes		17,362	100.0

=== District 36 ===
Iowa Senate, District 36 General Election, 1964
Party	Candidate	Votes	%
Democratic	C. Joseph Coleman (incumbent)	11,799	64.0
Republican	Fred E. Reese	6,637	36.0
Total votes		18,436	100.0
Democratic hold			

=== District 38 ===
Iowa Senate, District 38 General Election, 1964
Party	Candidate	Votes	%
Republican	J. Henry Lucken (incumbent)	8,829	51.3
Democratic	Charles V. Wiley	8,371	48.7
Total votes		17,200	100.0

=== District 39 ===
- The 39th was a 2-member district following the 1964 election. Subdistrict No. 1 held an election for a four-year term; however, Subdistrict No. 2 held an election for a two-year term.

Iowa Senate, District 39 Subdistrict No. 1 General Election, 1964
Party	Candidate	Votes	%
Democratic	Vincent S. Burke	24,184	56.5
Republican	Charles S. Van Eaton (incumbent) (Note: Redistricted from district 32 to 39.)	18,432	43.1
Independent	Ruth E. Haafke	168	0.4
Total votes		42,784	100.0
Democratic gain from Republican			

Iowa Senate, District 39 Subdistrict No. 2 Republican Primary Election, 1964
Party	Candidate	Votes	%
Republican	Alden J. Erksine	3,001	57.2
Republican	Harold Lum Nelson	2,242	42.8
Total votes		5,243	100.0

Iowa Senate, District 39 Subdistrict No. 2 General Election, 1964
Party	Candidate	Votes	%
Democratic	James M. McNally	25,372	59.6
Republican	Alden J. Erskine	17,222	40.4
Total votes		42,594	100.0

=== District 40 ===
Iowa Senate, District 40 Democratic Primary Election, 1964
Party	Candidate	Votes	%
Democratic	Adolph W. Elvers (incumbent)	1,503	59.7
Democratic	Lloyd G. F. Schroeder	1,016	40.3
Total votes		2,519	100.0

Iowa Senate, District 40 General Election, 1964
Party	Candidate	Votes	%
Democratic	Adolph W. Elvers (incumbent)	9,233	57.9
Republican	Leslie C. Klink	6,709	42.1
Total votes		15,942	100.0
Democratic gain from Republican			

=== District 41 ===
Iowa Senate, District 41 Republican Primary Election, 1964
Party	Candidate	Votes	%
Republican	Rodney Drewes	1,977	52.0
Republican	Everett G. Scott	1,824	48.0
Total votes		3,801	100.0

Iowa Senate, District 41 General Election, 1964
Party	Candidate	Votes	%
Democratic	H. L. Heying	11,292	52.9
Republican	Rodney Drewes	10,055	47.1
Total votes		21,347	100.0
Democratic gain from Republican			

=== District 42 ===
Iowa Senate, District 42 General Election, 1964
Party	Candidate	Votes	%
Republican	Vernon Kyhl (incumbent)	12,400	58.0
Democratic	Herbert J. Max	8,976	42.0
Total votes		21,376	100.0

=== District 43 ===
- The 43rd held an election for a two-year term.

Iowa Senate, District 43 Republican Primary Election, 1964
Party	Candidate	Votes	%
Republican	R. W. Hagie	2,262	56.7
Republican	Verne A. Freie	1,729	43.3
Total votes		3,991	100.0

Iowa Senate, District 43 General Election, 1964
Party	Candidate	Votes	%
Republican	R. W. Hagie	6,713	51.7
Democratic	A. T. Keough	6,264	48.3
Total votes		12,977	100.0
Republican hold			

=== District 46 ===
Iowa Senate, District 46 General Election, 1964
Party	Candidate	Votes	%
Democratic	Delbert Floy	11,129	54.0
Republican	Leigh R. Curran (incumbent) (Note: Redistricted from district 43 to 46.)	9,479	46.0
Total votes		20,608	100.0
Democratic gain from Republican			

=== District 47 ===
Iowa Senate, District 47 General Election, 1964
Party	Candidate	Votes	%
Democratic	John Leonard Buren	5,752	50.3
Republican	Jacob Grimstead (incumbent) (Note: Redistricted from district 41 to 47.)	5,690	49.7
Total votes		11,442	100.0
Democratic gain from Republican			

=== District 48 ===
Iowa Senate, District 48 General Election, 1964
Party	Candidate	Votes	%
Democratic	John P. Kibbie	7,097	58.8
Republican	Jack B. White	4,917	40.7
Independent	Ray C. Haman	61	0.5
Total votes		12,075	100.0

=== District 49 ===
Iowa Senate, District 49 Republican Primary Election, 1964
Party	Candidate	Votes	%
Republican	LeRoy Getting (incumbent) (Note: Redistricted from district 47 to 49.)	1,952	61.0
Republican	Merrill H. Fritts	1,246	39.0
Total votes		3,198	100.0

Iowa Senate, District 49 General Election, 1964
Party	Candidate	Votes	%
Democratic	H. Kenneth Nurse	6,468	52.1
Republican	LeRoy Getting (incumbent)	5,956	47.9
Total votes		12,424	100.0
Democratic hold			

=== District 50 ===
Iowa Senate, District 50 Republican Primary Election, 1964
Party	Candidate	Votes	%
Republican	Lucas J. DeKoster	3,090	65.1
Republican	J. T. Dykhouse (incumbent) (Note: Redistricted from district 24 to 50.)	1,653	34.9
Total votes		4,743	100.0

Iowa Senate, District 50 General Election, 1964
Party	Candidate	Votes	%
Republican	Lucas J. DeKoster	12,210	100.0
Total votes		12,210	100.0

=== District 51 ===
Iowa Senate, District 51 General Election, 1964
Party	Candidate	Votes	%
Democratic	Merle W. Hagedorn	6,848	54.4
Republican	Roy J. Smith	5,732	45.6
Total votes		12,580	100.0

=== District 52 ===
- The 52nd held an election for a two-year term.

Iowa Senate, District 52 General Election, 1964
Party	Candidate	Votes	%
Republican	Elmer F. Lange	9,140	52.9
Democratic	Henry C. Kitchen	8,147	47.1
Total votes		17,287	100.0

=== District 53 ===
Iowa Senate, District 53 General Election, 1964
Party	Candidate	Votes	%
Democratic	Donald W. Murray	8,277	52.4
Republican	Angus L. Cotton	7,509	47.6
Total votes		15,786	100.0

== See also ==
- United States elections, 1964
- United States House of Representatives elections in Iowa, 1964
- Elections in Iowa
