= 1968 Iowa Senate election =

- November 5, 1968

33 out of 61 seats in the Iowa State Senate 31 seats needed for a majority
	Majority party	Minority party
Leader	Robert R. Rigler	Andrew G. Frommelt
Party	Republican	Democratic
Leader's seat	40th	30th
Last election	29	32
Seats after	45	16
Seat change	▲16	▼16
Majority Leader before election
Andrew G. Frommelt
Democratic
Elected Majority Leader
David M. Stanley
Republican

The 1968 Iowa State Senate elections took place as part of the biennial 1968 United States elections. Iowa voters elected state senators in 33 of the state senate's 61 districts. At this time, the Iowa Senate still had several multi-member districts. State senators serve four-year terms in the Iowa State Senate.

A statewide map of the 61 state Senate districts in the year 1968 is provided by the Iowa General Assembly here.

The primary election on September 3, 1968, determined which candidates appeared on the November 5, 1968 general election ballot. Primary election results can be obtained here. General election results can be obtained here.

Following the previous election, Democrats had control of the Iowa state Senate with 32 seats to Republicans' 29 seats.

To claim control of the chamber from Democrats, the Republicans needed to net 2 Senate seats.

Republicans flipped control of the Iowa State Senate following the 1968 general election with the balance of power shifting to Republicans holding 45 seats and Democrats having 16 seats (a net gain of 16 seats for Republicans).

== Summary of Results ==
- Note: The 28 holdover Senators not up for re-election are listed here with asterisks (*). A list of these holdover state senators is provided here.

State Senate District	Incumbent	Party	Incoming Senator	Party
1st	Seeley G. Lodwick*	Rep	Seeley G. Lodwick*	Rep
2nd	Max E. Reno	Dem	Charles G. Mogged	Rep
3rd	Donald Sherman McGill	Dem	Donald Sherman McGill	Dem
4th	Franklin S. Main	Dem	Quentin V. Anderson	Rep
5th	James E. Briles	Rep	James E. Briles	Rep
6th	Charles Vernon "Vern" Lisle*	Rep	Charles Vernon "Vern" Lisle*	Rep
7th	Robert R. Dodds*	Dem	Robert R. Dodds*	Dem
8th	Richard Lytle Stephens*	Rep	Richard Lytle Stephens*	Rep
9th	Gene W. Glenn*	Dem	Gene W. Glenn*	Dem
10th	Bass Van Gilst	Dem	Bass Van Gilst	Dem
11th	Stanley M. Heaberlin	Dem	Charles O. Laverty	Rep
12th	Joseph B. Flatt	Rep	Joseph B. Flatt	Rep
13th	Thomas J. "T. J." Frey*	Rep	Thomas J. "T. J." Frey*	Rep
13th	Gilbert E. Klefstad	Dem	Jim Griffin	Rep
14th	David M. Stanley*	Rep	David M. Stanley*	Rep
15th	Joseph W. Cassidy	Dem	Edward E. Nicholson*	Rep
15th	Roger W. Jepsen	Rep	Harold A. Thordsen	Rep
16th	Roger John Shaff*	Rep	Roger John Shaff*	Rep
17th	Robert J. Burns	Dem	Minnette Doderer	Dem
18th	Kenneth Benda*	Rep	Kenneth Benda*	Rep
19th	Eugene Marshall Hill*	Dem	Eugene Marshall Hill*	Dem
20th	Howard Reppert	Dem	William D. Palmer	Dem
20th	George E. O'Malley*	Dem	George E. O'Malley*	Dem
20th	William F. Denman*	Dem	William F. Denman*	Dem
20th	Lee H. Gaudineer	Dem	Lee H. Gaudineer	Dem
20th	William J. "Bill" Reichardt*	Dem	William J. "Bill" Reichardt*	Dem
21st	Edwin Alan Shirley	Dem	Edwin Alan Shirley	Dem
22nd	James F. Schaben	Dem	James F. Schaben	Dem
23rd	Clifton C. Lamborn*	Rep	Clifton C. Lamborn*	Rep
24th	John M. Ely	Dem	Ralph Wilson Potter	Rep
24th	Ernest Kosek*	Rep	Ernest Kosek*	Rep
24th	Tom Riley	Rep	Jesse Donald "J. Don" Weimer	Dem
25th	Charles F. Balloun*	Rep	Charles F. Balloun*	Rep
26th	Max Milo Mills	Rep	John L. Mowry	Rep
27th	Pearle P. DeHart*	Rep	Pearle P. DeHart*	Rep
28th	Warren J. Kruck	Dem	R. Dean Arbuckle	Rep
29th	Arthur A. Neu*	Rep	Arthur A. Neu*	Rep
30th	Andrew G. Frommelt*	Dem	Andrew G. Frommelt*	Dem
30th	John M. Walsh*	Rep	John M. Walsh*	Rep
31st	John W. Patton	Dem	Kenneth Lawrence Parker	Rep
32nd	Francis L. Messerly*	Rep	Francis L. Messerly*	Rep
32nd	Chester O. Hougen*	Rep	Chester O. Hougen*	Rep
32nd	Gene F. Condon	Dem	W. Charlene Conklin	Rep
33rd	James A. Potgeter*	Rep	James A. Potgeter*	Rep
34th	Hugh H. Clarke*	Rep	Hugh H. Clarke*	Rep
35th	C. Joseph Coleman	Dem	C. Joseph Coleman	Dem
36th	Elmer F. Lange*	Rep	Elmer F. Lange*	Rep
37th	Charles S. Van Eaton	Rep	Charles K. Sullivan	Rep
37th	Alden J. Erskine*	Rep	Alden J. Erskine*	Rep
38th	Adolph W. Elvers	Dem	Leslie C. Klink	Rep
39th	Hilarius Louis "H. L." Heying	Dem	Floyd Gilley	Rep
40th	Robert R. Rigler*	Rep	Robert R. Rigler*	Rep
41st	Vernon Kyhl	Rep	Vernon Kyhl	Rep
42nd	Delbert W. Floy	Dem	Leigh Raymond Curran	Rep
43rd	John L. Buren	Dem	Herbert Luther "H.L." Ollenburg	Rep
44th	Donald W. Murray	Dem	Wayne D. Keith	Rep
45th	John P. "Jack" Kibbie	Dem	Walter B. Hammer	Rep
46th	Merle W. Hagedorn	Dem	J. Leslie Leonard	Rep
47th	J. Henry Lucken	Rep	J. Henry Lucken	Rep
48th	H. Kenneth Nurse	Dem	Marvin Wesley Smith	Rep
49th	Lucas DeKoster	Rep	Lucas DeKoster	Rep

== Detailed Results ==
- 33 of the 61 Iowa Senate seats were up for election in 1968. (Note: Districts 15, 20, and 24 elected 2 senators. Remember, in 1968, multi-member districts still existed in the Iowa Senate.)
- Note: If a district does not list a primary, then that district did not have a competitive primary (i.e., there may have only been one candidate file for that district).

=== District 2 ===
Iowa Senate, District 2 General Election, 1968
Party	Candidate	Votes	%
Republican	Charles G. Mogged	7,955	55.5
Democratic	Max E. Reno (incumbent)	6,384	44.5
Total votes		14,339	100.0
Republican gain from Democratic			

=== District 3 ===
Iowa Senate, District 3 General Election, 1968
Party	Candidate	Votes	%
Democratic	Donald S. McGill (incumbent)	7,978	50.7
Republican	Delmont Moffitt	7,754	49.3
Total votes		15,732	100.0
Democratic hold			

=== District 4 ===
Iowa Senate, District 4 General Election, 1968
Party	Candidate	Votes	%
Republican	Quentin V. Anderson	8,700	55.5
Democratic	Franklin S. Main (incumbent)	6,982	44.5
Total votes		15,682	100.0
Republican gain from Democratic			

=== District 5 ===
Iowa Senate, District 5 Republican Primary Election, 1968
Party	Candidate	Votes	%
Republican	James E. Briles (incumbent)	4,239	62.3
Republican	Edward A. Wearin	2,565	37.7
Total votes		6,804	100.0

Iowa Senate, District 5 General Election, 1968
Party	Candidate	Votes	%
Republican	James E. Briles (incumbent)	12,918	67.6
Democratic	Orval C. Walter	6,188	32.4
Total votes		19,106	100.0
Republican hold			

=== District 10 ===
Iowa Senate, District 10 General Election, 1968
Party	Candidate	Votes	%
Democratic	Bass Van Gilst (incumbent)	7,861	50.4
Republican	Lake M. Crookham	7,744	49.6
Total votes		15,605	100.0
Democratic hold			

=== District 11 ===
Iowa Senate, District 11 Republican Primary Election, 1968
Party	Candidate	Votes	%
Republican	Charles O. Laverty	1,661	35.5
Republican	Wallace F. McKee	1,243	26.6
Republican	Julian B. Garrett	945	20.2
Republican	Bruce Shawver Glenn	828	17.7
Total votes		4,677	100.0

Iowa Senate, District 11 General Election, 1968
Party	Candidate	Votes	%
Republican	Charles O. Laverty	10,846	50.5
Democratic	Stanley M. Heaberlin (incumbent)	10,636	49.5
Total votes		21,482	100.0
Republican gain from Democratic			

=== District 12 ===
Iowa Senate, District 12 General Election, 1968
Party	Candidate	Votes	%
Republican	Joseph B. Flatt (incumbent)	11,146	65.5
Democratic	Jay E. Howe	5,872	34.5
Total votes		17,018	100.0
Republican hold			

=== District 13 ===
- The 13th was a 2-member district in 1968. The first subdistrict had a holdover Senator.

Iowa Senate, District 13 Subdistrict No. 2 Republican Primary Election, 1968
Party	Candidate	Votes	%
Republican	Jim Griffin	832	59.9
Republican	Alvin B. Moore	557	40.1
Total votes		1,389	100.0

Iowa Senate, District 13 Subdistrict No. 2 General Election, 1968
Party	Candidate	Votes	%
Republican	Jim Griffin	5,612	50.9
Democratic	Gilbert E. Klefstad (incumbent)	5,417	49.1
Total votes		11,029	100.0
Republican gain from Democratic			

=== District 15 ===
- The 15th was a 2-member district in 1968. Both subdistricts held elections.

Iowa Senate, District 15 Subdistrict No. 1 General Election, 1968
Party	Candidate	Votes	%
Republican	Harold A. Thordsen	11,939	50.1
Democratic	Joseph W. Cassidy (incumbent)	11,889	49.9
Total votes		23,828	100.0
Republican gain from Democratic			

Iowa Senate, District 15 Subdistrict No. 2 Special Election, 1968
Party	Candidate	Votes	%
Republican	Edward E. Nicholson	2,623	65.7
Democratic	Karl H. Hellman	1,371	34.3
Total votes		3,994	100.0
Republican hold			

=== District 17 ===
Iowa Senate, District 17 General Election, 1968
Party	Candidate	Votes	%
Democratic	Minnette Doderer	14,034	56.2
Republican	D. C. Nolan	10,946	43.8
Total votes		24,980	100.0
Democratic hold			

=== District 20 ===
- The 20th was a 5-member district in 1968. Subdistricts Nos. 2, 3, & 5 had holdover Senators. Subdistricts Nos. 1 & 4 held elections.

Iowa Senate, District 20 Subdistrict No. 1 General Election, 1968
Party	Candidate	Votes	%
Democratic	William D. Palmer	13,182	57.1
Republican	James R. Maggert	9,892	42.9
Total votes		23,074	100.0
Democratic hold			

Iowa Senate, District 20 Subdistrict No. 4 General Election, 1968
Party	Candidate	Votes	%
Democratic	Lee H. Gaudineer, Jr. (incumbent)	8,122	60.8
Republican	Joseph G. Bertroche	5,232	39.2
Total votes		13,354	100.0
Democratic hold			

=== District 21 ===
Iowa Senate, District 21 General Election, 1968
Party	Candidate	Votes	%
Democratic	Alan Shirley (incumbent)	10,443	51.0
Republican	Leroy H. Petersen	10,014	49.0
Total votes		20,457	100.0
Democratic hold			

=== District 24 ===
- The 24th was a 3-member district in 1968. Subdistrict No. 2 had a holdover Senator. Subdistricts Nos. 1 & 3 held elections.

Iowa Senate, District 24 Subdistrict No. 1 General Election, 1968
Party	Candidate	Votes	%
Republican	Ralph W. Potter	11,488	54.7
Democratic	Myron B. Oxley	9,500	45.3
Total votes		20,988	100.0
Republican gain from Democratic			

Iowa Senate, District 24 Subdistrict No. 3 Special Election, 1968
Party	Candidate	Votes	%
Democratic	J. Don Weimer	10,247	57.9
Republican	Roger D. Patton	7,457	42.1
Total votes		17,704	100.0
Democratic gain from Republican			

=== District 26 ===
Iowa Senate, District 26 Republican Primary Election, 1968
Party	Candidate	Votes	%
Republican	John L. Mowry	2,515	56.5
Republican	Vernon J. Ferguson	1,940	43.5
Total votes		4,455	100.0

Iowa Senate, District 26 Democratic Primary Election, 1968
Party	Candidate	Votes	%
Democratic	LaVern Hoelscher	581	56.1
Democratic	Robert E. Rider, Sr.	454	43.9
Total votes		1,035	100.0

Iowa Senate, District 26 General Election, 1968
Party	Candidate	Votes	%
Republican	John L. Mowry	9,091	58.0
Democratic	LaVern Hoelscher	6,589	42.0
Total votes		15,680	100.0
Republican hold			

=== District 28 ===
Iowa Senate, District 28 Democratic Primary Election, 1968
Party	Candidate	Votes	%
Democratic	George E. Uthe	1,065	55.2
Democratic	Warren J. Kruck (incumbent)	864	44.8
Total votes		1,929	100.0

Iowa Senate, District 28 General Election, 1968
Party	Candidate	Votes	%
Republican	Dean Arbuckle	8,692	55.6
Democratic	George E. Uthe	6,948	44.4
Total votes		15,640	100.0
Republican gain from Democratic			

=== District 31 ===
Iowa Senate, District 31 General Election, 1968
Party	Candidate	Votes	%
Republican	Kenneth Parker	8,169	52.4
Democratic	John W. Patton (incumbent)	7,419	47.6
Total votes		15,588	100.0
Republican gain from Democratic			

=== District 32 ===
- The 32nd was a 3-member district in 1968. Subdistricts Nos. 1 & 2 had holdover Senators. Subdistrict No. 3 held an election.

Iowa Senate, District 32 Subdistrict No. 3 General Election, 1968
Party	Candidate	Votes	%
Republican	W. Charlene Conklin	9,479	52.9
Democratic	James V. Gallagher	8,435	47.1
Total votes		17,914	100.0
Republican gain from Democratic			

=== District 35 ===
Iowa Senate, District 35 General Election, 1968
Party	Candidate	Votes	%
Democratic	C. Joseph Coleman (incumbent)	10,303	56.8
Republican	DeVere A. Freeman	7,848	43.2
Total votes		18,151	100.0
Democratic hold			

=== District 37 ===
- The 37th was a 2-member district in 1968. Subdistrict No. 2 had a holdover Senator. Subdistrict No. 1 held an election.

Iowa Senate, District 37 Subdistrict No. 1 General Election, 1968
Party	Candidate	Votes	%
Republican	Charles K. Sullivan	10,073	50.04
Democratic	Vincent S. Burke	10,057	49.96
Total votes		20,130	100.0
Republican hold			

=== District 38 ===
Iowa Senate, District 38 General Election, 1968
Party	Candidate	Votes	%
Republican	Leslie C. Klink	8,011	52.3
Democratic	Adolph W. Elvers (incumbent)	7,299	47.7
Total votes		15,310	100.0
Republican gain from Democratic			

=== District 39 ===
Iowa Senate, District 39 Republican Primary Election, 1968
Party	Candidate	Votes	%
Republican	Floyd Gilley	3,306	63.1
Republican	Jesse W. Wepler	1,933	36.9
Total votes		5,239	100.0

Iowa Senate, District 39 General Election, 1968
Party	Candidate	Votes	%
Republican	Floyd Gilley	10,662	52.6
Democratic	H. L. Heying (incumbent)	9,599	47.4
Total votes		20,261	100.0
Republican gain from Democratic			

=== District 41 ===
Iowa Senate, District 41 Republican Primary Election, 1968
Party	Candidate	Votes	%
Republican	Vernon H. Kyhl (incumbent)	3,008	58.0
Republican	Harry J. Eastman	2,181	42.0
Total votes		5,189	100.0

Iowa Senate, District 41 General Election, 1968
Party	Candidate	Votes	%
Republican	Vernon H. Kyhl (incumbent)	13,986	100.0
Total votes		13,986	100.0
Republican hold			

=== District 42 ===
Iowa Senate, District 42 Republican Primary Election, 1968
Party	Candidate	Votes	%
Republican	Leigh Curran	3,178	78.4
Republican	Glen E. Bandel	873	21.6
Total votes		4,051	100.0

Iowa Senate, District 42 General Election, 1968
Party	Candidate	Votes	%
Republican	Leigh R. Curran	11,436	58.3
Democratic	James T. Shannon	8,196	41.7
Total votes		19,632	100.0
Republican gain from Democratic			

=== District 43 ===
Iowa Senate, District 43 Republican Primary Election, 1968
Party	Candidate	Votes	%
Republican	H. L. Ollenburg	2,147	50.7
Republican	C. E. Judd	2,084	49.3
Total votes		4,231	100.0

Iowa Senate, District 43 General Election, 1968
Party	Candidate	Votes	%
Republican	H. L. Ollenburg	9,005	58.1
Democratic	John L. Buren (incumbent)	6,491	41.9
Total votes		15,496	100.0
Republican gain from Democratic			

=== District 44 ===
Iowa Senate, District 44 Republican Primary Election, 1968
Party	Candidate	Votes	%
Republican	Wayne Keith	1,946	50.9
Republican	Jean M. Kleve	1,874	49.1
Total votes		3,820	100.0

Iowa Senate, District 44 General Election, 1968
Party	Candidate	Votes	%
Republican	Wayne Keith	8,102	54.0
Democratic	Donald W. Murray (incumbent)	6,903	46.0
Total votes		15,005	100.0
Republican gain from Democratic			

=== District 45 ===
Iowa Senate, District 45 General Election, 1968
Party	Candidate	Votes	%
Republican	Walter B. Hammer	8,675	52.2
Democratic	John P. "Jack" Kibbie (incumbent)	7,932	47.8
Total votes		16,607	100.0
Republican gain from Democratic			

=== District 46 ===
Iowa Senate, District 46 Republican Primary Election, 1968
Party	Candidate	Votes	%
Republican	J. Leslie Leonard	2,158	55.2
Republican	Wayne J. Simington	1,753	44.8
Total votes		3,911	100.0

Iowa Senate, District 46 Democratic Primary Election, 1968
Party	Candidate	Votes	%
Democratic	Merle W. Hagedorn (incumbent)	652	58.6
Democratic	Chris Lauritsen	461	41.4
Total votes		1,113	100.0

Iowa Senate, District 46 General Election, 1968
Party	Candidate	Votes	%
Republican	J. Leslie Leonard	8,669	56.2
Democratic	Merle W. Hagedorn (incumbent)	6,747	43.8
Total votes		15,416	100.0
Republican gain from Democratic			

=== District 47 ===
Iowa Senate, District 47 Republican Primary Election, 1968
Party	Candidate	Votes	%
Republican	J. Henry Lucken (incumbent)	2,565	62.0
Republican	Jack D. McDougall	1,574	38.0
Total votes		4,139	100.0

Iowa Senate, District 47 General Election, 1968
Party	Candidate	Votes	%
Republican	J. Henry Lucken (incumbent)	10,569	63.4
Democratic	Charles Wiley	6,091	36.6
Total votes		16,660	100.0
Republican hold			

=== District 48 ===
Iowa Senate, District 48 Democratic Primary Election, 1968
Party	Candidate	Votes	%
Democratic	H. Kenneth Nurse (incumbent)	1,128	62.4
Democratic	Raymond H. Van Kekerix	679	37.6
Total votes		1,807	100.0

Iowa Senate, District 48 General Election, 1968
Party	Candidate	Votes	%
Republican	Marvin W. Smith	10,581	62.3
Democratic	H. Kenneth Nurse (incumbent)	6,414	37.7
Total votes		16,995	100.0
Republican gain from Democratic			

=== District 49 ===
Iowa Senate, District 49 General Election, 1968
Party	Candidate	Votes	%
Republican	Lucas J. DeKoster (incumbent)	14,211	100.0
Total votes		14,211	100.0
Republican hold			

== See also ==
- United States elections, 1968
- United States House of Representatives elections in Iowa, 1968
- Elections in Iowa
