= 1966 Iowa Senate election =

- November 8, 1966

32 out of 61 seats in the Iowa State Senate 31 seats needed for a majority
	Majority party	Minority party
Leader	Andrew G. Frommelt	Robert R. Rigler
Party	Democratic	Republican
Leader's seat	30th	40th
Last election	34	25
Seats after	32	29
Seat change	▼2 (Note: The Iowa state Senate was expanded from 59 to 61 seats following the 1966 election.)	▲4
Majority Leader before election
Andrew G. Frommelt
Democratic
Elected Majority Leader
Andrew G. Frommelt
Democratic

The 1966 Iowa State Senate elections took place as part of the biennial 1966 United States elections. Iowa voters elected state senators in 32 of the state senate's 61 districts. At this time, the Iowa Senate still had several multi-member districts. State senators serve four-year terms in the Iowa State Senate.

The Iowa Senate was expanded from 59 to 61 members and new district maps were drawn for the 1966 election. The Iowa General Assembly provides statewide maps of each district.

The primary election on September 6, 1966, determined which candidates appeared on the November 8, 1966 general election ballot.

Following the previous election, Democrats had control of the Iowa state Senate with 34 seats to Republicans' 25 seats.

To claim control of the chamber from Democrats, the Republicans needed to net 6 Senate seats.

Democrats maintained control of the Iowa State Senate following the 1966 general election with the balance of power shifting to Democrats holding 32 seats and Republicans having 29 seats (a net gain of 4 seats for Republicans and net loss of 2 seats for Democrats).

== Summary of Results ==
- Note: The 29 holdover Senators not up for re-election are listed here with asterisks (*).

State Senate District	Incumbent	Party	Incoming Senator	Party
1st	Seeley G. Lodwick	Rep	Seeley G. Lodwick	Rep
2nd	Max E. Reno	Dem	Max E. Reno*	Dem
3rd	Don S. McGill	Dem	Don S. McGill*	Dem
4th	Franklin S. Main	Dem	Franklin S. Main*	Dem
5th	James E. Briles	Rep	James E. Briles*	Rep
6th	Charles Vernon "Vern" Lisle	Rep	Charles Vernon "Vern" Lisle	Rep
7th	Robert R. Dodds	Dem	Robert R. Dodds	Dem
8th	Clifford M. Vance	Rep	Richard Lytle Stephens (Note: Redistricted from district 10 to 8.)	Rep
9th	Jacob B. "Jake" Mincks	Dem	Gene W. Glenn	Dem
10th	Richard Lytle Stephens	Rep	Bass Van Gilst* (Note: Redistricted from district 11 to 10.)	Dem
11th	Bass Van Gilst	Dem	Stanley M. Heaberlin* (Note: Redistricted from district 12 to 11.)	Dem
12th	Stanley M. Heaberlin	Dem	Joseph B. Flatt* (Note: Redistricted from district 13 to 12.)	Rep
13th (Note: The 13th transitioned from a 1- to 2-member district.)	Joseph B. Flatt	Rep	Thomas J. "T. J." Frey	Rep
13th	Newly created subdistrict		Gilbert E. Klefstad* (Note: Redistricted from district 15 to 13.)	Dem
14th	John David Shoeman	Rep	David M. Stanley* (Note: Redistricted from district 16 to 14.)	Rep
15th (Note: The 15th transitioned from a 1- to 2-member district.)	Gilbert E. Klefstad	Dem	Joseph W. Cassidy* (Note: Redistricted from district 17 to 15.)	Dem
15th	Newly created subdistrict		Roger W. Jepsen	Rep
16th	David M. Stanley	Rep	Roger John Shaff	Rep
17th (Note: The 17th transitioned from a 2- to 1-member district.)	Joseph W. Cassidy	Dem	Robert J. Burns* (Note: Redistricted from district 21 to 17.)	Dem
17th	Jack Schroeder	Rep	Robert J. Burns*	Dem
18th	David O. Shaff	Rep	Kenneth Benda (Note: Redistricted from district 23 to 18.)	Rep
19th	Howard Tabor	Dem	Eugene Marshall Hill (Note: Redistricted from district 25 to 19.)	Dem
20th (Note: The 20th transitioned from a 2- to 5-member district.)	John M. Ely	Dem	Howard Reppert* (Note: Redistricted from district 27 to 20.)	Dem
20th	Tom Riley	Rep	George E. O'Malley (Note: Redistricted from district 27 to 20.)	Dem
20th	Newly created subdistrict		William F. Denman (Note: Redistricted from district 27 to 20.)	Dem
20th	Newly created subdistrict		Lee H. Gaudineer	Dem
20th	Newly created subdistrict		William J. "Bill" Reichardt	Dem
21st	Robert J. Burns	Dem	Edwin Alan Shirley* (Note: Redistricted from district 29 to 21.)	Dem
22nd	Charles Balloun	Rep	James F. Schaben	Dem
23rd	Kenneth Benda	Rep	Clifton C. Lamborn	Rep
24th (Note: The 24th transitioned from a 1- to 3-member district.)	Max Milo Mills	Rep	John M. Ely* (Note: Redistricted from district 20 to 24.)	Dem
24th	Newly created subdistrict		Ernest Kosek	Rep
24th	Newly created subdistrict		Tom Riley (Note: Redistricted from district 20 to 24.)	Rep
25th	Eugene Marshall Hill	Dem	Charles F. Balloun (Note: Redistricted from district 22 to 25.)	Rep
26th	Daryl Hallett Nims	Dem	Max Milo Mills* (Note: Redistricted from district 24 to 26.)	Rep
27th (Note: The 27th transitioned from a 3- to 1-member district.)	Howard Reppert	Dem	Pearle P. DeHart	Rep
27th	George E. O'Malley	Dem	Pearle P. DeHart	Rep
27th	William F. Denman	Dem	Pearle P. DeHart	Rep
28th	Warren J. Kruck	Dem	Warren J. Kruck*	Dem
29th	Alan Shirley	Dem	Arthur A. Neu	Rep
30th (Note: The 30th transitioned from a 1- to 2-member district.)	Peter F. Hansen	Dem	Andrew G. Frommelt (Note: Redistricted from district 32 to 30.)	Dem
30th	Newly created subdistrict		John M. Walsh	Rep
31st	Charles F. Griffin	Rep	John W. Patton* (Note: Redistricted from district 33 to 31.)	Dem
32nd (Note: The 32nd transitioned from a 1- to 3-member district.)	Andrew G. Frommelt	Dem	Francis L. Messerly (Note: Redistricted from district 34 to 32.)	Rep
32nd	Newly created subdistrict		Chester O. Hougen	Rep
32nd	Newly created subdistrict		Gene F. Condon* (Note: Redistricted from district 34 to 32.)	Dem
33rd	John W. Patton	Dem	James A. Potgeter	Rep
34th (Note: The 34th transitioned from a 2- to 1-member district.)	Gene F. Condon	Dem	Hugh H. Clarke	Rep
34th	Francis LaVern Messerly	Rep	Hugh H. Clarke	Rep
35th	John A. Walker	Rep	C. Joseph Coleman* (Note: Redistricted from district 36 to 35.)	Dem
36th	C. Joseph Coleman	Dem	Elmer F. Lange (Note: Redistricted from district 52 to 36.)	Rep
37th (Note: The 37th transitioned from a 1- to 2-member district.)	Donald G. Beneke	Rep	Charles S. Van Eaton	Rep
37th	Newly created subdistrict		Alden J. Erskine	Rep
38th	J. Henry Lucken	Rep	Adolph W. Elvers* (Note: Redistricted from district 40 to 38.)	Dem
39th (Note: The 39th transitioned from a 2- to 1-member district.)	Vincent S. Burke	Dem	Hilarius Louis "H. L." Heying* (Note: Redistricted from district 41 to 39.)	Dem
39th	James M. McNally	Dem	Hilarius Louis "H. L." Heying*	Dem
40th	Adolph W. Elvers	Dem	Robert R. Rigler (Note: Redistricted from district 44 to 40.)	Rep
41st	Hilarius Louis "H. L." Heying	Dem	Vernon Kyhl* (Note: Redistricted from district 42 to 41.)	Rep
42nd	Vernon Kyhl	Rep	Delbert W. Floy* (Note: Redistricted from district 46 to 42.)	Dem
43rd	Raymond W. Hagie	Rep	John L. Buren* (Note: Redistricted from district 47 to 43.)	Dem
44th	Robert R. Rigler	Rep	Donald W. Murray* (Note: Redistricted from district 53 to 44.)	Dem
45th	Leo Elthon	Rep	John P. "Jack" Kibbie* (Note: Redistricted from district 48 to 45.)	Dem
46th	Delbert W. Floy	Dem	Merle W. Hagedorn* (Note: Redistricted from district 51 to 46.)	Dem
47th	John Leonard Buren	Dem	J. Henry Lucken* (Note: Redistricted from district 38 to 47.)	Rep
48th	Jack Kibbie	Dem	H. Kenneth Nurse* (Note: Redistricted from district 49 to 48.)	Dem
49th	H. Kenneth Nurse	Dem	Lucas DeKoster* (Note: Redistricted from district 50 to 49.)	Rep
50th (Note: The 50th district became obsolete (done away with) following redistricting.)	Lucas DeKoster	Rep	Obsolete district	
51st (Note: The 51st district became obsolete (done away with) following redistricting.)	Merle W. Hagedorn	Dem	Obsolete district	
52nd (Note: The 52nd district became obsolete (done away with) following redistricting.)	Elmer F. Lange	Rep	Obsolete district	
53rd (Note: The 53rd district became obsolete (done away with) following redistricting.)	Donald W. Murray	Dem	Obsolete district	

== Detailed Results ==
- 32 of the 61 Iowa Senate seats were up for election in 1966. (Note: Multi-member districts in the electoral map of 1966 elections were: 13th with 2 seats; 15th with 2 seats; 20th with 5 seats; 24th with 3 seats; 30th with 2 seats; 32nd with 3 seats; and, 37th with 2 seats. Remember, in 1966, multi-member districts still existed in the Iowa Senate.)
- Note: If a district does not list a primary, then that district did not have a competitive primary (i.e., there may have only been one candidate file for that district).

=== District 1 ===
Iowa Senate, District 1 General Election, 1966
Party	Candidate	Votes	%
Republican	Seeley G. Lodwick (incumbent)	7,612	56.5
Democratic	Robert O'Malley	5,872	43.5
Total votes		13,484	100.0
Republican hold			

=== District 6 ===
Iowa Senate, District 6 General Election, 1966
Party	Candidate	Votes	%
Republican	Vern Lisle (incumbent)	10,046	71.8
Democratic	F. S. Toke Nelson	3,937	28.2
Total votes		13,983	100.0
Republican hold			

=== District 7 ===
Iowa Senate, District 7 General Election, 1966
Party	Candidate	Votes	%
Democratic	Robert R. Dodds (incumbent)	8,225	55.3
Republican	Robert A. Reppert	6,655	44.7
Total votes		14,880	100.0
Democratic hold			

=== District 8 ===
Iowa Senate, District 8 Republican Primary Election, 1966
Party	Candidate	Votes	%
Republican	Richard L. Stephens (incumbent)	2,670	61.4
Republican	Ralph B. Morris	1,676	38.6
Total votes		4,346	100.0

Iowa Senate, District 8 Democratic Primary Election, 1966
Party	Candidate	Votes	%
Democratic	F. W. Schnoebelen	882	58.5
Democratic	Ralph H. Smutz	626	41.5
Total votes		1,508	100.0

Iowa Senate, District 8 General Election, 1966
Party	Candidate	Votes	%
Republican	Richard L. Stephens (incumbent)	9,051	61.4
Democratic	F. W. Schnoebelen	5,697	38.6
Total votes		14,748	100.0
Republican hold			

=== District 9 ===
Iowa Senate, District 9 Democratic Primary Election, 1966
Party	Candidate	Votes	%
Democratic	Gene W. Glenn	2,257	58.8
Democratic	Jake B. Mincks (incumbent)	1,579	41.2
Total votes		3,836	100.0

Iowa Senate, District 9 General Election, 1966
Party	Candidate	Votes	%
Democratic	Gene W. Glenn	7,745	52.8
Republican	Robert A. Haw	6,928	47.2
Total votes		14,673	100.0
Democratic hold			

=== District 13 ===
- The 13th was a 2-member district following the 1966 election. Subdistrict No. 2 was held by holdover Senator Klefstad.

Iowa Senate, District 13 Subdistrict No. 1 Republican Primary Election, 1966
Party	Candidate	Votes	%
Republican	T. J. Frey	2,529	52.0
Republican	Wylie D. King	2,331	48.0
Total votes		4,860	100.0

Iowa Senate, District 13 Subdistrict No. 1 General Election, 1966
Party	Candidate	Votes	%
Republican	T. J. Frey	12,736	65.4
Democratic	Paul E. Wise	6,752	34.6
Total votes		19,488	100.0
Republican hold			

=== District 14 ===
Iowa Senate, District 14 General Election, 1966
Party	Candidate	Votes	%
Republican	David Stanley (incumbent)	11,055	73.4
Democratic	Herschel Flater	4,008	26.6
Total votes		15,063	100.0
Republican hold			

=== District 15 ===
- The 15th was a 2-member district following the 1966 election. Subdistrict No. 1 was held by holdover Senator Cassidy.

Iowa Senate, District 15 Subdistrict No. 2 Republican Primary Election, 1966
Party	Candidate	Votes	%
Republican	Roger W. Jepsen	4,099	70.0
Republican	Riley Dietz	1,753	30.0
Total votes		5,852	100.0

Iowa Senate, District 15 Subdistrict No. 2 General Election, 1966
Party	Candidate	Votes	%
Republican	Roger W. Jepsen	22,158	60.6
Democratic	Carroll L. Wright	14,433	39.4
Total votes		36,591	100.0

=== District 16 ===
Iowa Senate, District 16 General Election, 1966
Party	Candidate	Votes	%
Republican	Roger J. Shaff	9,207	57.0
Democratic	David J. Delaney	6,945	43.0
Total votes		16,152	100.0
Republican hold			

=== District 18 ===
Iowa Senate, District 18 General Election, 1966
Party	Candidate	Votes	%
Republican	Kenneth Benda (incumbent)	7,202	100.0
Total votes		7,202	100.0
Republican hold			

=== District 19 ===
Iowa Senate, District 19 General Election, 1966
Party	Candidate	Votes	%
Democratic	Eugene M. Hill (incumbent)	6,351	52.2
Republican	Emmett Butler	5,809	47.8
Total votes		12,160	100.0
Democratic hold			

=== District 20 ===
- The 20th was a 5-member district following the 1966 election. Subdistrict No. 1 was held by holdover Senator Reppert. Subdistrict No. 4 held an election for a two-year term; whereas, subdistricts Nos. 2, 3, & 5 held elections for four-year terms.

Iowa Senate, District 20 Subdistrict Nos. 2, 3, & 5 Democratic Primary Election, 1966
Party	Candidate	Votes	%
Democratic	George E. O'Malley (incumbent)	7,890	31.7
Democratic	William F. Denman (incumbent)	6,738	27.0
Democratic	William J. "Bill" Reichardt	5,290	21.2
Democratic	F. Mac Danielson	5,000	20.1
Total votes		24,918	100.0

Iowa Senate, District 20 Subdistrict Nos. 2, 3, & 5 General Election, 1966
Party	Candidate	Votes	%
Democratic	George E. O'Malley (incumbent)	45,525	18.9
Democratic	William F. Denman (incumbent)	44,254	18.4
Democratic	William J. "Bill" Reichardt	43,599	18.1
Republican	Kate Goldman	39,589	16.4
Republican	Joseph B. Joyce	33,341	13.9
Republican	James E. Ball III	32,643	13.6
Constitution	Albert A. Payne	1,104	0.4
Constitution	Larry Russell Jaussi	669	0.3
Total votes		240,724	100.0

- Election for a two-year term in subdistrict No. 4.

Iowa Senate, District 20 Subdistrict No. 4 General Election, 1966
Party	Candidate	Votes	%
Democratic	Lee H. Gaudineer, Jr.	43,473	55.5
Republican	Gerald C. Shearer	34,891	44.5
Total votes		78,364	100.0

=== District 22 ===
Iowa Senate, District 22 Democratic Primary Election, 1966
Party	Candidate	Votes	%
Democratic	James F. Schaben	1,490	70.1
Democratic	Elroy Maule	637	29.9
Total votes		2,127	100.0

Iowa Senate, District 22 General Election, 1966
Party	Candidate	Votes	%
Democratic	James F. Schaben	8,179	54.3
Republican	Rowley L. Williams	6,877	45.7
Total votes		15,056	100.0
Democratic gain from Republican			

=== District 23 ===
Iowa Senate, District 23 General Election, 1966
Party	Candidate	Votes	%
Republican	Clifton C. Lamborn	6,896	55.8
Democratic	John A. Holmes	5,452	44.2
Total votes		12,348	100.0
Republican hold			

=== District 24 ===
- The 24th was a 3-member district following the 1966 election. Subdistrict No. 1 was held by holdover Senator Ely. Subdistricts Nos. 2 & 3 held elections.

Iowa Senate, District 24 Subdistricts Nos. 2 & 3 Republican Primary Election, 1966
Party	Candidate	Votes	%
Republican	Tom Riley (incumbent)	5,776	43.5
Republican	Ernest Kosek	3,828	28.7
Republican	John Zacher, Jr.	3,689	27.8
Total votes		13,293	100.0

Iowa Senate, District 24 Subdistricts Nos. 2 & 3 General Election, 1966
Party	Candidate	Votes	%
Republican	Tom Riley (incumbent)	29,276	32.3
Republican	Ernest Kosek	23,637	26.1
Democratic	Kenneth M. Moore	20,688	22.9
Democratic	Carl B. Newell	17,106	18.7
Total votes		90,707	100.0

=== District 25 ===
Iowa Senate, District 25 General Election, 1966
Party	Candidate	Votes	%
Republican	Charles F. Balloun (incumbent)	7,834	57.5
Democratic	Russell O. Callahan	5,796	42.5
Total votes		13,630	100.0
Republican gain from Democratic			

=== District 27 ===
Iowa Senate, District 27 General Election, 1966
Party	Candidate	Votes	%
Republican	Pearle P. DeHart	8,087	52.3
Democratic	Daryl H. Nims (incumbent) (Note: Redistricted from district 26 to 27.)	7,365	47.7
Total votes		15,452	100.0
Republican gain from Democratic			

=== District 29 ===
Iowa Senate, District 29 Democratic Primary Election, 1966
Party	Candidate	Votes	%
Democratic	Louis R. Galetich	2,686	58.9
Democratic	Peter F. Hansen (incumbent) (Note: Redistricted from district 30 to 29.)	1,872	41.1
Total votes		4,558	100.0

Iowa Senate, District 29 General Election, 1966
Party	Candidate	Votes	%
Republican	Arthur A. Neu	7,526	54.2
Democratic	Louis R. Galetich	6,372	45.8
Total votes		13,898	100.0
Republican gain from Democratic			

=== District 30 ===
- The 30th was a 2-member district following the 1966 election. Both subdistricts Nos. 1 & 2 held elections.

Iowa Senate, District 30 Subdistricts Nos. 1 & 2 Democratic Primary Election, 1966
Party	Candidate	Votes	%
Democratic	Andrew G. Frommelt (incumbent)	4,276	41.7
Democratic	Frank A. Saunders	3,636	35.4
Democratic	Henry Bregman	2,348	22.9
Total votes		10,260	100.0

Iowa Senate, District 30 Subdistricts Nos. 1 & 2 General Election, 1966
Party	Candidate	Votes	%
Democratic	Andrew G. Frommelt (incumbent)	14,593	35.62
Republican	John M. Walsh	14,587	35.60
Democratic	Frank A. Saunders	11,789	28.78
Total votes		40,969	100.0

=== District 32 ===
- The 32nd was a 3-member district following the 1966 election. Subdistrict No. 3 had a holdover Senator Condon. Subdistricts Nos. 1 & 2 held elections.

Iowa Senate, District 32 Subdistricts Nos. 1 & 2 General Election, 1966
Party	Candidate	Votes	%
Republican	Francis Messerly (incumbent)	21,255	28.3
Republican	Chester O. Hougen	20,507	27.3
Democratic	Gertrude S. Cohen	16,746	22.3
Democratic	J. L. Rooff	16,504	22.1
Total votes		75,012	100.0

=== District 33 ===
Iowa Senate, District 33 General Election, 1966
Party	Candidate	Votes	%
Republican	James A. Potgeter	10,907	69.3
Democratic	A. T. Keough	4,830	30.7
Total votes		15,737	100.0
Republican gain from Democratic			

=== District 34 ===
Iowa Senate, District 34 Republican Primary Election, 1966
Party	Candidate	Votes	%
Republican	Hugh H. Clarke	1,940	50.4
Republican	John A. Walker (incumbent) (Note: Redistricted from district 35 to 34.)	1,911	49.6
Total votes		3,851	100.0

Iowa Senate, District 34 General Election, 1966
Party	Candidate	Votes	%
Republican	Hugh Clarke	6,890	61.9
Democratic	Edward E. Busing	4,239	38.1
Total votes		11,129	100.0
Republican hold			

=== District 36 ===
Iowa Senate, District 36 General Election, 1966
Party	Candidate	Votes	%
Republican	Elmer F. Lange (incumbent)	8,556	67.0
Democratic	Earl Vannatta	4,205	33.0
Total votes		12,761	100.0
Republican gain from Democratic			

=== District 37 ===
- The 37th was a 2-member district following the 1966 election. Subdistrict No. 1 held a special election for a two-year term. Subdistrict No. 2 held an election for a four-year term.

Iowa Senate, District 37 Subdistrict No. 1 Special Election, 1966
Party	Candidate	Votes	%
Republican	Charles S. Van Eaton	17,637	55.7
Democratic	John S. Sheehan	14,051	44.3
Total votes		31,688	100.0
Republican hold			

- Subdistrict No. 2 held an election for a four-year term.

Iowa Senate, District 37 Subdistrict No. 2 General Election, 1966
Party	Candidate	Votes	%
Republican	Alden J. Erskine	17,090	54.2
Democratic	Donald V. Doyle	14,436	45.8
Total votes		31,526	100.0

=== District 40 ===
Iowa Senate, District 40 General Election, 1966
Party	Candidate	Votes	%
Republican	Robert R. Rigler (incumbent)	10,099	61.0
Democratic	William C. Shea	6,461	39.0
Total votes		16,560	100.0
Republican gain from Democratic			

== See also ==
- United States elections, 1966
- United States House of Representatives elections in Iowa, 1966
- Elections in Iowa
