= 1962 Iowa Senate election =

- November 6, 1962

27 out of 50 seats in the Iowa State Senate 26 seats needed for a majority
	Majority party	Minority party
Leader	Robert R. Rigler	Andrew G. Frommelt
Party	Republican	Democratic
Leader's seat	44th	32nd
Last election	35	15
Seats after	38	12
Seat change	▲3	▼3
Majority Leader before election
Robert R. Rigler
Republican
Elected Majority Leader
Robert R. Rigler
Republican

The 1962 Iowa State Senate elections took place as part of the biennial 1962 United States elections. Iowa voters elected state senators in 27 of the state senate's 50 districts. At that time, the Iowa Senate still had several multi-member districts. (Note: Multi-member districts following the 1962 elections were: 6th with 2 seats; 8th with 2 seats; 14th with 2 seats; 17th with 2 seats; 23rd with 2 seats; 25th with 2 seats; 27th with 2 seats; 31st with 2 seats; and, 32nd with 2 seats.) State senators serve four-year terms in the Iowa State Senate.

The Iowa General Assembly provides statewide maps of each district. To compare the effect of the 1962 redistricting process on the location of each district, contrast the previous map with the map used for 1962 elections. (Note: Districts using the old district boundaries map were: 4th, 5th, 14th (subdistrict won by Senator Campbell), 15th, 31st (subdistrict won by Senator Doran), and 39th.)

The primary election on June 4, 1962, determined which candidates appeared on the November 6, 1962 general election ballot.

Following the previous election, Republicans had control of the Iowa state Senate with 35 seats to Democrats' 15 seats.

To claim control of the chamber from Republicans, the Democrats needed to net 11 Senate seats.

Republicans maintained control of the Iowa State Senate following the 1962 general election with the balance of power shifting to Republicans holding 38 seats and Democrats having 12 seats (a net gain of 3 seats for Republicans).

== Summary of Results ==
- Note: The 23 holdover Senators not up for re-election are listed here with asterisks (*).

State Senate District	Incumbent	Party	Incoming Senator	Party
1st	Charles F. Eppers	Dem	Seeley G. Lodwick	Rep
2nd	Dewey Blake Phelps	Rep	Dewey Blake Phelps*	Rep
3rd	Joe N. Wilson	Rep	Joe N. Wilson*	Rep
4th	William C. Stuart	Rep	Howard Vincent	Rep
5th	Xavier Thomas Prentis	Rep	Franklin S. Main	Dem
6th	Orval C. Walter	Dem	Orval C. Walter*	Dem
6th	Newly created subdistrict		Charles Vernon "Vern" Lisle	Rep
7th	Frank Hoxie	Rep	Robert R. Dodds	Dem
8th	Edward Anderson Wearin	Rep	Edward Anderson Wearin*	Rep
8th	Newly created subdistrict		Clifford M. Vance (Note: Redistricted from district 10 to 8.)	Rep
9th	Carl Hoschek	Dem	Jacob B. "Jake" Mincks (Note: Redistricted from district 13 to 9.)	Dem
10th	Clifford M. Vance	Rep	Richard Lytle Stephens	Rep
11th	J. Louis Fisher	Rep	J. Louis Fisher*	Rep
12th	C. Edwin Gilmour	Dem	Vacant	
13th	Jacob B. "Jake" Mincks	Dem	Vacant	
14th	John Gray	Rep	John L. Campbell	Rep
14th	Newly created subdistrict		John David Shoeman (Note: Redistricted from district 18 to 14.)	Rep
15th	Carroll Price	Rep	Vera H. Shivvers	Rep
16th	Joseph B. Flatt	Rep	Joseph B. Flatt*	Rep
17th	Harry L. Cowden	Rep	Harry L. Cowden*	Rep
17th	Newly created subdistrict		Jack Schroeder (Note: Redistricted from district 21 to 17.)	Rep
18th	John David Shoeman	Rep	David O. Shaff (Note: Redistricted from district 22 to 18.)	Rep
19th	Richard C. Turner	Rep	Richard C. Turner*	Rep
20th	George W. Weber	Rep	Vacant	
21st	Jack Schroeder	Rep	Vacant	
22nd	David O. Shaff	Rep	Robert Orville "R. O." Burrows	Rep
23rd	David Earl Elijah	Rep	David Earl Elijah*	Rep
23rd	Newly created subdistrict		Kenneth Benda	Rep
24th	Jans T. "J. T." Dykhouse	Rep	Jans T. "J. T." Dykhouse*	Rep
25th	Daniel Clifford "D. C." Nolan	Rep	Daniel Clifford "D. C." Nolan*	Rep
25th	Newly created subdistrict		Eugene Marshall Hill (Note: Redistricted from district 29 to 25.)	Dem
26th	Martin Wiley	Rep	Martin Wiley*	Rep
27th	C. Joseph Coleman	Dem	C. Joseph Coleman*	Dem
27th	Newly created subdistrict		George E. O'Malley (Note: Redistricted from district 30 to 27.)	Dem
28th	Howard C. Buck	Rep	Howard C. Buck*	Rep
29th	Eugene Marshall Hill	Dem	Vacant	
30th	George E. O'Malley	Dem	Peter F. Hansen (Note: Redistricted from district 48 to 30.)	Dem
31st	Clifford N. Nystrom	Rep	Alvin V. Doran	Rep
31st	Newly created subdistrict		Charles F. Griffin	Rep
32nd	Charles S. Van Eaton	Rep	Charles S. Van Eaton*	Rep
32nd	Newly created subdistrict		Andrew G. Frommelt (Note: Redistricted from district 35 to 32.)	Dem
33rd	Irving D. Long	Rep	Irving D. Long*	Rep
34th	Robert G. Moore	Dem	Robert D. Fulton	Dem
35th	Andrew G. Frommelt	Dem	John A. Walker (Note: Redistricted from district 37 to 35.)	Rep
36th	Adolph W. Elvers	Dem	Adolph W. Elvers*	Dem
37th	John A. Walker	Rep	Donald G. Beneke (Note: Redistricted from district 50 to 37.)	Rep
38th	Melvin Harlan Wolf	Dem	Vacant	
39th	J. Kendall Lynes (Note: Deceased in 1962 prior to general election.)	Rep	Vernon Kyhl	Rep
40th	George Lindsey Scott	Rep	George Lindsey Scott*	Rep
41st	Jacob Grimstead	Rep	Jacob Grimstead*	Rep
42nd	Lynn Potter	Dem	Vacant	
43rd	Leigh Raymond Curran	Rep	Leigh Raymond Curran*	Rep
44th	Robert R. Rigler	Rep	Robert R. Rigler	Rep
45th	Lawrence Putney	Rep	Leo Elthon	Rep
46th	J. Henry Lucken	Rep	J. Henry Lucken*	Rep
47th	LeRoy Getting	Rep	LeRoy Getting*	Rep
48th	Peter F. Hansen	Dem	Vacant	
49th	John J. Brown	Dem	John J. Brown*	Dem
50th	Donald G. Beneke	Rep	Vacant	

== Detailed Results ==
- 27 of the 50 Iowa Senate seats were up for election in 1962. 21 of the races were in newly drawn seats with the borders from this map. However, there were six races for unexpired terms in districts that were using the prior map here.
- Note: If a district does not list a primary, then that district did not have a competitive primary (i.e., there may have only been one candidate file for that district).

=== District 1 ===
Iowa Senate, District 1 General Election, 1962
Party	Candidate	Votes	%
Republican	Seeley G. Lodwick	6,810	50.6
Democratic	Joseph L. Phelan	6,654	49.4
Total votes		13,464	100.0
Republican gain from Democratic			

=== District 4 ===
Iowa Senate, District 4 General Election, 1962
Party	Candidate	Votes	%
Republican	Howard Vincent	4,024	51.9
Democratic	Bob Hellyer	3,731	48.1
Total votes		7,755	100.0
Republican hold			

=== District 5 ===
Iowa Senate, District 5 Republican Primary Election, 1962
Party	Candidate	Votes	%
Republican	Marshall F. Camp	2,101	40.6
Republican	Charles O. Nelson	1,716	33.2
Republican	Robert E. Maggert	1,359	26.2
Total votes		5,176	100.0

Iowa Senate, District 5 General Election, 1962
Party	Candidate	Votes	%
Democratic	Franklin S. Main	6,211	51.4
Republican	Marshall F. Camp	5,872	48.6
Total votes		12,083	100.0
Democratic gain from Republican			

=== District 6 ===
- The 6th was a 2-member district following the 1962 election. Subdistrict No. 1 had a holdover Senator; however, Subdistrict No. 2 held an election.

Iowa Senate, District 6 Subdistrict No. 2 Republican Primary Election, 1962
Party	Candidate	Votes	%
Republican	Vern Lisle	2,443	45.7
Republican	Frank Hoxie (incumbent) (Note: Redistricted from district 7 to 6.)	1,798	33.7
Republican	William H. Harbor	1,101	20.6
Total votes		5,342	100.0

Iowa Senate, District 6 Subdistrict No. 2 General Election, 1962
Party	Candidate	Votes	%
Republican	Vern Lisle	7,515	63.3
Democratic	Mrs. Paul Scott	4,348	36.7
Total votes		11,863	100.0

=== District 7 ===
Iowa Senate, District 7 Republican Primary Election, 1962
Party	Candidate	Votes	%
Republican	T. K. Ford	1,599	50.7
Republican	Howard Waters	1,557	49.3
Total votes		3,156	100.0

Iowa Senate, District 7 General Election, 1962
Party	Candidate	Votes	%
Democratic	Robert R. Dodds	7,941	57.3
Republican	T. K. Ford	5,929	42.7
Total votes		13,870	100.0
Democratic gain from Republican			

=== District 8 ===
- The 8th was a 2-member district following the 1962 election. Subdistrict No. 1 had a holdover Senator; however, Subdistrict No. 2 held an election.

Iowa Senate, District 8 Subdistrict No. 2 General Election, 1962
Party	Candidate	Votes	%
Republican	Clifford M. Vance (incumbent)	6,525	100.0
Total votes		6,525	100.0

=== District 9 ===
Iowa Senate, District 9 General Election, 1962
Party	Candidate	Votes	%
Democratic	Jake B. Mincks (incumbent)	8,484	53.8
Republican	George R. Barcus	7,272	46.2
Total votes		15,756	100.0
Democratic hold			

=== District 10 ===
Iowa Senate, District 10 General Election, 1962
Party	Candidate	Votes	%
Republican	Richard L. Stephens	4,964	59.0
Democratic	Dale H. Rickert	3,452	41.0
Total votes		8,416	100.0
Republican hold			

=== District 14 ===
- The 14th was a 2-member district following the 1962 election. Subdistrict No. 1 held an election for a two-year term using the prior district boundaries map; however, Subdistrict No. 2 held an election for a four-year term using the redrawn district boundaries.

Iowa Senate, District 14 Subdistrict No. 1 Republican Primary Election, 1962
Party	Candidate	Votes	%
Republican	John L. Campbell	1,270	44.9
Republican	E. Royd McCurdy	1,029	36.3
Republican	Gerald Gay	533	18.8
Total votes		2,832	100.0

Iowa Senate, District 14 Subdistrict No. 1 Democratic Primary Election, 1962
Party	Candidate	Votes	%
Democratic	Bass Van Gilst	596	59.0
Democratic	John B. Heslinga	414	41.0
Total votes		1,010	100.0

Iowa Senate, District 14 Subdistrict No. 1 General Election, 1962
Party	Candidate	Votes	%
Republican	John L. Campbell	3,712	52.0
Democratic	Bass Van Gilst	3,421	48.0
Total votes		7,133	100.0
Republican hold			

Iowa Senate, District 14 Subdistrict No. 2 General Election, 1962
Party	Candidate	Votes	%
Republican	John D. Shoeman (incumbent)	8,060	57.6
Democratic	Duane Orton	5,921	42.4
Total votes		13,981	100.0

=== District 15 ===
Iowa Senate, District 15 General Election, 1962
Party	Candidate	Votes	%
Republican	L. C. Shivvers	6,167	52.4
Democratic	Paul W. Eggers	5,613	47.6
Total votes		11,780	100.0
Republican hold			

- Though he won the general election, L. C. Shivvers was deceased. This necessitated a special election on January 10, 1963.

Iowa Senate, District 15 Special Election, 1963
Party	Candidate	Votes	%
Republican	Vera H. Shivvers	2,921	53.0
Democratic	Howard H. Myers	2,586	47.0
Total votes		5,507	100.0
Republican hold			

=== District 17 ===
- The 17th was a 2-member district following the 1962 election. Subdistrict No. 1 had a holdover Senator; however, Subdistrict No. 2 held an election.

Iowa Senate, District 17 Subdistrict No. 2 Republican Primary Election, 1962
Party	Candidate	Votes	%
Republican	Jack Schroeder (incumbent)	3,247	64.0
Republican	Frank C. Clark	1,829	36.0
Total votes		5,076	100.0

Iowa Senate, District 17 Subdistrict No. 2 General Election, 1962
Party	Candidate	Votes	%
Republican	Jack Schroeder (incumbent)	16,931	58.3
Democratic	James B. McGrath	12,099	41.7
Total votes		29,030	100.0

=== District 18 ===
Iowa Senate, District 18 General Election, 1962
Party	Candidate	Votes	%
Republican	David O. Shaff (incumbent)	8,212	58.2
Democratic	John E. Taylor	5,896	41.8
Total votes		14,108	100.0
Republican hold			

=== District 22 ===
Iowa Senate, District 22 General Election, 1962
Party	Candidate	Votes	%
Republican	R. O. Burrows, Sr.	7,115	100.0
Total votes		7,115	100.0
Republican hold			

=== District 23 ===
- The 23rd was a 2-member district following the 1962 election. Subdistrict No. 1 had a holdover Senator; however, Subdistrict No. 2 held an election.

Iowa Senate, District 23 Subdistrict No. 2 General Election, 1962
Party	Candidate	Votes	%
Republican	Kenneth Benda	6,144	57.2
Democratic	David M. Ahrens	4,590	42.8
Total votes		10,734	100.0

=== District 25 ===
- The 25th was a 2-member district following the 1962 election. Subdistrict No. 1 had a holdover Senator; however, Subdistrict No. 2 held an election.

Iowa Senate, District 25 Subdistrict No. 2 General Election, 1962
Party	Candidate	Votes	%
Democratic	Eugene M. Hill (incumbent)	5,483	51.6
Republican	Jack M. Wormley	5,149	48.4
Total votes		10,632	100.0

=== District 27 ===
- The 27th was a 2-member district following the 1962 election. Subdistrict No. 1 had a holdover Senator; however, Subdistrict No. 2 held an election.

Iowa Senate, District 27 Subdistrict No. 2 General Election, 1962
Party	Candidate	Votes	%
Democratic	George E. O'Malley (incumbent)	48,201	62.9
Republican	George E. Flagg	28,378	37.1
Total votes		76,579	100.0

=== District 30 ===
Iowa Senate, District 30 Republican Primary Election, 1962
Party	Candidate	Votes	%
Republican	Thomas Conner	2,009	50.3
Republican	Hugo P. Saggau	1,986	49.7
Total votes		3,995	100.0

Iowa Senate, District 30 General Election, 1962
Party	Candidate	Votes	%
Democratic	Peter F. Hansen (incumbent)	10,021	56.4
Republican	Thomas Conner	7,755	43.6
Total votes		17,776	100.0
Democratic hold			

=== District 31 ===
- The 31st was a 2-member district following the 1962 election. Subdistrict No. 1 held an election for a two-year term using the prior district boundaries map; however, Subdistrict No. 2 held an election for a four-year term using the redrawn district boundaries.

Iowa Senate, District 31 Subdistrict No. 1 General Election, 1962
Party	Candidate	Votes	%
Republican	A. V. Doran	12,127	52.8
Democratic	Conrad E. Lawlor	10,844	47.2
Total votes		22,971	100.0
Republican hold			

Iowa Senate, District 31 Subdistrict No. 2 General Election, 1962
Party	Candidate	Votes	%
Republican	Charles F. Griffin	4,790	50.7
Democratic	Robert G. Moore (incumbent) (Note: Redistricted from district 34 to 31.)	4,665	49.3
Total votes		9,455	100.0

=== District 32 ===
- The 32nd was a 2-member district following the 1962 election. Subdistrict No. 1 had a holdover Senator; however, Subdistrict No. 2 held an election.

Iowa Senate, District 32 Subdistrict No. 2 General Election, 1962
Party	Candidate	Votes	%
Democratic	Andrew G. Frommelt (incumbent)	14,997	100.0
Total votes		14,997	100.0

=== District 34 ===
Iowa Senate, District 34 General Election, 1962
Party	Candidate	Votes	%
Democratic	Robert D. Fulton	16,974	50.4
Republican	Willard R. Hansen	16,715	49.6
Total votes		33,689	100.0
Democratic hold			

=== District 35 ===
Iowa Senate, District 35 Republican Primary Election, 1962
Party	Candidate	Votes	%
Republican	John A. Walker (incumbent)	2,332	56.8
Republican	John P. Whitesell	1,775	43.2
Total votes		4,107	100.0

Iowa Senate, District 35 General Election, 1962
Party	Candidate	Votes	%
Republican	John A. Walker (incumbent)	7,320	100.0
Total votes		7,320	100.0
Republican gain from Democratic			

=== District 37 ===
Iowa Senate, District 37 General Election, 1962
Party	Candidate	Votes	%
Republican	Donald G. Beneke (incumbent)	8,940	60.3
Democratic	Anthony T. Halligan	5,892	39.7
Total votes		14,832	100.0
Republican hold			

=== District 39 ===
Iowa Senate, District 39 General Election, 1962
Party	Candidate	Votes	%
Republican	Vernon H. Kyhl	8,408	57.0
Democratic	Herbert Max	6,332	43.0
Total votes		14,740	100.0
Republican hold			

=== District 44 ===
Iowa Senate, District 44 General Election, 1962
Party	Candidate	Votes	%
Republican	Robert R. Rigler (incumbent)	6,402	57.5
Democratic	Paul Erb	4,738	42.5
Total votes		11,140	100.0
Republican hold			

=== District 45 ===
Iowa Senate, District 45 General Election, 1962
Party	Candidate	Votes	%
Republican	Leo Elthon	6,344	51.3
Democratic	Lynn Potter (incumbent) (Note: Redistricted from district 42 to 45.)	6,032	48.7
Total votes		12,376	100.0
Republican hold			

== See also ==
- United States elections, 1962
- United States House of Representatives elections in Iowa, 1962
- Elections in Iowa
