= 1958 Iowa Senate election =

- November 4, 1958

22 out of 50 seats in the Iowa State Senate 26 seats needed for a majority
	Majority party	Minority party
Leader	Daniel Clifford "D. C." Nolan	George E. O'Malley
Party	Republican	Democratic
Leader's seat	25th	30th
Last election	40	10
Seats after	33	17
Seat change	▼7	▲7
Majority Leader before election
D. C. Nolan
Republican
Elected Majority Leader
Jack Schroeder
Republican

The 1958 Iowa State Senate elections took place as part of the biennial 1958 United States elections. Iowa voters elected state senators in 22 of the state senate's 50 districts. State senators serve four-year terms in the Iowa State Senate.

A statewide map of the 50 state Senate districts in the year 1958 is provided by the Iowa General Assembly here.

The primary election on June 2, 1958, determined which candidates appeared on the November 4, 1958 general election ballot.

Following the previous election, Republicans had control of the Iowa state Senate with 40 seats to Democrats' 10 seats.

To claim control of the chamber from Republicans, the Democrats needed to net 16 Senate seats.

Republicans maintained control of the Iowa State Senate following the 1958 general election with the balance of power shifting to Republicans holding 33 seats and Democrats having 17 seats (a net gain of 7 seats for Democrats).

== Summary of Results ==
- Note: The 28 holdover Senators not up for re-election are not listed on this table.

State Senate District	Incumbent	Party	Incoming Senator	Party
1st	Edward Joseph McManus	Dem	Charles F. Eppers	Dem
7th	Frank Hoxie	Rep	Frank Hoxie	Rep
9th	Thomas J. Dailey	Dem	Carl Hoschek	Dem
10th	Carl T. Anderson	Rep	Clifford M. Vance	Rep
12th	Wilbur Cleland Molison	Rep	C. Edwin Gilmour	Dem
13th	Samuel H. Burton	Dem	Jacob B. "Jake" Mincks	Dem
18th	John David Shoeman	Rep	John David Shoeman	Rep
20th	George W. Weber	Rep	George W. Weber	Rep
21st	Jack Schroeder	Rep	Jack Schroeder	Rep
22nd	David O. Shaff	Rep	David O. Shaff	Rep
29th	Jack Morris Wormley	Rep	Eugene Marshall Hill	Dem
30th	George E. O'Malley	Dem	George E. O'Malley	Dem
34th	Albert Weiss	Rep	Robert G. Moore	Dem
35th	Arnold Utzig	Dem	Andrew G. Frommelt	Dem
37th	John A. Walker	Rep	John A. Walker	Rep
38th	Arch Wallace McFarlane	Rep	Melvin Harlan Wolf	Dem
42nd	Frank D. Elwood	Rep	Lynn Potter	Dem
43rd	William H. Tate	Rep	Walter E. Edelen	Dem
44th	Robert R. Rigler	Rep	Robert R. Rigler	Rep
45th	Lawrence Putney	Rep	Lawrence Putney	Rep
48th	Alan William Vest	Rep	Peter F. Hansen	Dem
50th	Guy G. Butler	Rep	Guy G. Butler	Rep

== Detailed Results ==
- NOTE: The 28 districts that did not hold elections in 1958 are not listed here.
- Note: The Iowa Secretary of State's website does not document any competitive intra-party primaries for state Senate races in 1958.

=== District 1 ===
Iowa Senate, District 1 General Election, 1958
Party	Candidate	Votes	%
Democratic	Charles F. Eppers	7,326	54.0
Republican	Charles O. Frazier	6,232	46.0
Total votes		13,558	100.0
Democratic hold			

=== District 7 ===
Iowa Senate, District 7 General Election, 1958
Party	Candidate	Votes	%
Republican	Frank Hoxie (incumbent)	6,081	60.2
Democratic	Ralph H. Greenwood	4,028	39.8
Total votes		10,109	100.0
Republican hold			

=== District 9 ===
Iowa Senate, District 9 General Election, 1958
Party	Candidate	Votes	%
Democratic	Carl Hoschek	7,200	50.1
Republican	Blythe C. Conn	7,158	49.9
Total votes		14,358	100.0
Democratic hold			

=== District 10 ===
Iowa Senate, District 10 General Election, 1958
Party	Candidate	Votes	%
Republican	Clifford M. Vance	6,633	60.6
Democratic	Virgil F. Trabert	4,309	39.4
Total votes		10,942	100.0
Republican hold			

=== District 12 ===
Iowa Senate, District 12 General Election, 1958
Party	Candidate	Votes	%
Democratic	C. Edwin Gilmour	5,689	50.1
Republican	Wilbur C. Molison (incumbent)	5,665	49.9
Total votes		11,354	100.0
Democratic gain from Republican			

=== District 13 ===
Iowa Senate, District 13 General Election, 1958
Party	Candidate	Votes	%
Democratic	Jake B. Mincks	8,585	59.4
Republican	Elmer K. Bekman	5,860	40.6
Total votes		14,445	100.0
Democratic hold			

=== District 18 ===
Iowa Senate, District 18 General Election, 1958
Party	Candidate	Votes	%
Republican	John D. Shoeman	6,571	53.5
Democratic	George P. Christensen	5,700	46.5
Total votes		12,271	100.0
Republican hold			

=== District 20 ===
Iowa Senate, District 20 General Election, 1958
Party	Candidate	Votes	%
Republican	George W. Weber (incumbent)	6,758	54.2
Democratic	Harold O. Keele	5,701	45.8
Total votes		12,459	100.0
Republican hold			

=== District 21 ===
Iowa Senate, District 21 General Election, 1958
Party	Candidate	Votes	%
Republican	Jack Schroeder (incumbent)	15,756	57.5
Democratic	Richard T. Foley	11,622	42.5
Total votes		27,378	100.0
Republican hold			

=== District 22 ===
Iowa Senate, District 22 General Election, 1958
Party	Candidate	Votes	%
Republican	David O. Shaff (incumbent)	8,330	55.5
Democratic	Robert J. Soesbe	6,686	44.5
Total votes		15,016	100.0
Republican hold			

=== District 29 ===
Iowa Senate, District 29 General Election, 1958
Party	Candidate	Votes	%
Democratic	Eugene M. Hill	6,119	52.3
Republican	Jack M. Wormley (incumbent)	5,570	47.7
Total votes		11,689	100.0
Democratic gain from Republican			

=== District 30 ===
Iowa Senate, District 30 General Election, 1958
Party	Candidate	Votes	%
Democratic	George E. O'Malley (incumbent)	45,460	60.1
Republican	Herbert H. Hauge	30,170	39.9
Total votes		75,630	100.0
Democratic hold			

=== District 34 ===
Iowa Senate, District 34 General Election, 1958
Party	Candidate	Votes	%
Democratic	R. G. Moore	8,445	53.3
Republican	Albert Weiss (incumbent)	7,403	46.7
Total votes		15,848	100.0
Democratic gain from Republican			

=== District 35 ===
Iowa Senate, District 35 General Election, 1958
Party	Candidate	Votes	%
Democratic	Andrew G. Frommelt	14,096	100.0
Total votes		14,096	100.0
Democratic hold			

=== District 37 ===
Iowa Senate, District 37 General Election, 1958
Party	Candidate	Votes	%
Republican	John A. Walker (incumbent)	9,991	56.2
Democratic	Martin H. Morrissey	7,792	43.8
Total votes		17,783	100.0
Republican hold			

=== District 38 ===
Iowa Senate, District 38 General Election, 1958
Party	Candidate	Votes	%
Democratic	Melvin H. Wolf	17,067	51.0
Republican	Arch W. McFarlane (incumbent)	16,367	49.0
Total votes		33,434	100.0
Democratic gain from Republican			

=== District 42 ===
Iowa Senate, District 42 General Election, 1958
Party	Candidate	Votes	%
Democratic	Lynn Potter	6,744	52.8
Republican	Marion Ringoen	6,037	47.2
Total votes		12,781	100.0
Democratic gain from Republican			

=== District 43 ===
Iowa Senate, District 43 General Election, 1958
Party	Candidate	Votes	%
Democratic	Walter E. Edelen	10,253	51.8
Republican	James B. Conroy	9,541	48.2
Total votes		19,794	100.0
Democratic gain from Republican			

=== District 44 ===
Iowa Senate, District 44 General Election, 1958
Party	Candidate	Votes	%
Republican	Robert R. Rigler (incumbent)	6,289	54.2
Democratic	John C. Sebern	5,304	45.8
Total votes		11,593	100.0
Republican hold			

=== District 45 ===
Iowa Senate, District 45 General Election, 1958
Party	Candidate	Votes	%
Republican	Lawrence Putney (incumbent)	9,356	53.0
Democratic	Hugo H. Joens	8,282	47.0
Total votes		17,638	100.0
Republican hold			

=== District 48 ===
Iowa Senate, District 48 General Election, 1958
Party	Candidate	Votes	%
Democratic	Peter F. Hansen	9,426	53.2
Republican	William R. Ferguson	8,294	46.8
Total votes		17,720	100.0
Democratic gain from Republican			

=== District 50 ===
Iowa Senate, District 50 General Election, 1958
Party	Candidate	Votes	%
Republican	Guy G. Butler (incumbent)	8,670	55.0
Democratic	Dean Loos	7,080	45.0
Total votes		15,750	100.0
Republican hold			

== See also ==
- United States elections, 1958
- United States House of Representatives elections in Iowa, 1958
- Elections in Iowa
