= 1954 Iowa Senate election =

- November 2, 1954

21 out of 50 seats in the Iowa State Senate 26 seats needed for a majority
| | Majority party | Minority party |
|---|---|---|
| Leader | Ralph Zastrow | George E. O'Malley |
| Party | Republican | Democratic |
| Leader's seat | 44th (retired) | 30th |
| Last election | 46 | 4 |
| Seats after | 44 | 6 |
| Seat change | ▼2 | ▲2 |
Majority Leader before election
Ralph Zastrow
Republican
Elected Majority Leader
Duane E. Dewel
Republican

The 1954 Iowa State Senate elections took place as part of the biennial 1954 United States elections. Iowa voters elected state senators in 21 of the state senate's 50 districts. State senators serve four-year terms in the Iowa State Senate.

A statewide map of the 50 state Senate districts in the 1954 elections is provided by the Iowa General Assembly here.

The primary election on June 7, 1954, determined which candidates appeared on the November 2, 1954 general election ballot.

Following the previous election, Republicans had control of the Iowa state Senate with 46 seats to Democrats' 4 seats.

To claim control of the chamber from Republicans, the Democrats needed to net 22 Senate seats. (Note: It was impossible for Democrats to flip control of the Iowa state Senate in the 1954 election given that only 21 seats were up for election and 22 were needed for Democrats to take control.)

Republicans maintained control of the Iowa State Senate following the 1954 general election with the balance of power shifting to Republicans holding 44 seats and Democrats having 6 seats (a net gain of 2 seats for Democrats).

== Summary of Results ==
- Note: The 29 holdover Senators not up for re-election are not listed on this table.

| State Senate District | Incumbent | Party | Incoming Senator | Party |
|---|---|---|---|---|
| 1st | Stanley Lawrence Hart | Rep | Edward Joseph McManus | Dem |
| 7th | Earl C. Fishbaugh | Rep | Frank Hoxie | Rep |
| 9th | Thomas J. Dailey | Dem | Thomas J. Dailey | Dem |
| 10th | Carl T. Anderson | Rep | Carl T. Anderson | Rep |
| 12th | Wilbur Cleland Molison | Rep | Wilbur Cleland Molison | Rep |
| 13th | Elmer K. Bekman | Rep | Samuel H. Burton | Dem |
| 18th | Jay C. Colburn | Rep | John David Shoeman | Rep |
| 20th | Herman B. Lord | Rep | George W. Weber | Rep |
| 21st | Philip T. Hedin | Rep | Jack Schroeder | Rep |
| 22nd | Erwin A. Schoening | Rep | David O. Shaff | Rep |
| 29th | James Harold Nesmith | Rep | Jack Morris Wormley | Rep |
| 30th | George E. O'Malley | Dem | George E. O'Malley | Dem |
| 34th | Eli Clarence Myrland | Rep | Albert Weiss | Rep |
| 35th | Arnold Utzig | Dem | Arnold Utzig | Dem |
| 37th | Rex R. Bateson | Rep | John A. Walker | Rep |
| 38th | John Peter Berg | Rep | Arch Wallace McFarlane | Rep |
| 42nd | William Linnevold | Rep | Frank D. Elwood | Rep |
| 44th | Ralph W. Zastrow | Rep | Robert R. Rigler | Rep |
| 45th | Harry E. Weichman | Rep | Lawrence Putney | Rep |
| 48th | Alan William Vest | Rep | Alan William Vest | Rep |
| 50th | R. J. Oltman | Rep | Guy G. Butler | Rep |

== Detailed Results ==
- NOTE: The 29 districts that did not hold elections in 1954 are not listed here.
- Note: If a district does not list a primary, then that district did not have a competitive primary (i.e., there may have only been one candidate file for that district).

=== District 1 ===
Iowa Senate, District 1 General Election, 1954
| Party | Candidate | Votes | % |
|---|---|---|---|
| Democratic | Edward J. McManus | 8,356 | 55.4 |
| Republican | Stanley L. Hart (incumbent) | 6,726 | 44.6 |
| Total votes | | 15,082 | 100.0 |
| Democratic gain from Republican | | | |

=== District 7 ===
Iowa Senate, District 7 General Election, 1954
| Party | Candidate | Votes | % |
|---|---|---|---|
| Republican | Frank Hoxie | 7,677 | 67.6 |
| Democratic | Jay Leeka | 3,680 | 32.4 |
| Total votes | | 11,357 | 100.0 |
| Republican hold | | | |

=== District 9 ===
Iowa Senate, District 9 Republican Primary Election, 1954
| Party | Candidate | Votes | % |
|---|---|---|---|
| Republican | John N. Calhoun | 1,756 | 52.2 |
| Republican | Blythe C. Conn | 1,609 | 47.8 |
| Total votes | | 3,365 | 100.0 |

Iowa Senate, District 9 General Election, 1954
| Party | Candidate | Votes | % |
|---|---|---|---|
| Democratic | Thomas J. Dailey (incumbent) | 8,287 | 59.0 |
| Republican | John N. Calhoun | 5,757 | 41.0 |
| Total votes | | 14,044 | 100.0 |
| Democratic hold | | | |

=== District 10 ===
Iowa Senate, District 10 General Election, 1954
| Party | Candidate | Votes | % |
|---|---|---|---|
| Republican | Carl T. Anderson (incumbent) | 7,629 | 59.5 |
| Democratic | James T. McCabe | 5,189 | 40.5 |
| Total votes | | 12,818 | 100.0 |
| Republican hold | | | |

=== District 12 ===
Iowa Senate, District 12 General Election, 1954
| Party | Candidate | Votes | % |
|---|---|---|---|
| Republican | Wilbur C. Molison (incumbent) | 6,904 | 55.8 |
| Democratic | William W. Augustine | 5,473 | 44.2 |
| Total votes | | 12,377 | 100.0 |
| Republican hold | | | |

=== District 13 ===
Iowa Senate, District 13 General Election, 1954
| Party | Candidate | Votes | % |
|---|---|---|---|
| Democratic | Sam Burton | 8,446 | 53.9 |
| Republican | Elmer K. Bekman (incumbent) | 7,221 | 46.1 |
| Total votes | | 15,667 | 100.0 |
| Democratic gain from Republican | | | |

=== District 18 ===
Iowa Senate, District 18 General Election, 1954
| Party | Candidate | Votes | % |
|---|---|---|---|
| Republican | John D. Shoeman | 7,815 | 65.9 |
| Democratic | J. Bruce Potter | 4,046 | 34.1 |
| Total votes | | 11,861 | 100.0 |
| Republican hold | | | |

=== District 20 ===
Iowa Senate, District 20 Republican Primary Election, 1954
| Party | Candidate | Votes | % |
|---|---|---|---|
| Republican | George W. Weber | 2,488 | 57.6 |
| Republican | Kenneth R. Moore | 1,834 | 42.4 |
| Total votes | | 4,322 | 100.0 |

Iowa Senate, District 20 General Election, 1954
| Party | Candidate | Votes | % |
|---|---|---|---|
| Republican | George W. Weber | 7,620 | 57.7 |
| Democratic | Charles E. Yoder | 5,592 | 42.3 |
| Total votes | | 13,212 | 100.0 |
| Republican hold | | | |

=== District 21 ===
Iowa Senate, District 21 General Election, 1954
| Party | Candidate | Votes | % |
|---|---|---|---|
| Republican | Jack Schroeder | 17,285 | 55.8 |
| Democratic | Vernon B. Trevellyan | 13,689 | 44.2 |
| Total votes | | 30,974 | 100.0 |
| Republican hold | | | |

=== District 22 ===
Iowa Senate, District 22 Republican Primary Election, 1954
| Party | Candidate | Votes | % |
|---|---|---|---|
| Republican | David O. Shaff | 2,201 | 51.6 |
| Republican | Erwin Schoening (incumbent) | 2,067 | 48.4 |
| Total votes | | 4,268 | 100.0 |

Iowa Senate, District 22 General Election, 1954
| Party | Candidate | Votes | % |
|---|---|---|---|
| Republican | David O. Shaff | 9,621 | 62.3 |
| Democratic | John M. Yackshaw | 5,810 | 37.7 |
| Total votes | | 15,431 | 100.0 |
| Republican hold | | | |

=== District 29 ===
Iowa Senate, District 29 Republican Primary Election, 1954
| Party | Candidate | Votes | % |
|---|---|---|---|
| Republican | Jack M. Wormley | 1,740 | 52.3 |
| Republican | Henry L. Kling | 837 | 25.1 |
| Republican | William P. Gannon | 753 | 22.6 |
| Total votes | | 3,330 | 100.0 |

Iowa Senate, District 29 General Election, 1954
| Party | Candidate | Votes | % |
|---|---|---|---|
| Republican | Jack M. Wormley | 5,768 | 51.8 |
| Democratic | Eugene M. Hill | 5,376 | 48.2 |
| Total votes | | 11,144 | 100.0 |
| Republican hold | | | |

=== District 30 ===
Iowa Senate, District 30 General Election, 1954
| Party | Candidate | Votes | % |
|---|---|---|---|
| Democratic | George E. O'Malley (incumbent) | 39,709 | 55.6 |
| Republican | Milton W. Strickler | 31,762 | 44.4 |
| Total votes | | 71,471 | 100.0 |
| Democratic hold | | | |

=== District 34 ===
Iowa Senate, District 34 Republican Primary Election, 1954
| Party | Candidate | Votes | % |
|---|---|---|---|
| Republican | Albert Weiss | 2,190 | 54.8 |
| Republican | E. C. Myrland (incumbent) | 1,804 | 45.2 |
| Total votes | | 3,994 | 100.0 |

Iowa Senate, District 34 General Election, 1954
| Party | Candidate | Votes | % |
|---|---|---|---|
| Republican | Albert Weiss | 9,351 | 55.9 |
| Democratic | Elroy Maule | 7,385 | 44.1 |
| Total votes | | 16,736 | 100.0 |
| Republican hold | | | |

=== District 35 ===
Iowa Senate, District 35 General Election, 1954
| Party | Candidate | Votes | % |
|---|---|---|---|
| Democratic | Arnold Utzig (incumbent) | 13,146 | 100.0 |
| Total votes | | 13,146 | 100.0 |
| Democratic hold | | | |

=== District 37 ===
Iowa Senate, District 37 General Election, 1954
| Party | Candidate | Votes | % |
|---|---|---|---|
| Republican | John A. Walker | 11,198 | 64.6 |
| Democratic | Mrs. G. H. Maxon | 6,123 | 35.4 |
| Total votes | | 17,321 | 100.0 |
| Republican hold | | | |

=== District 38 ===
Iowa Senate, District 38 Republican Primary Election, 1954
| Party | Candidate | Votes | % |
|---|---|---|---|
| Republican | Arch W. McFarlane | 3,661 | 52.1 |
| Republican | Bernard R. Balch | 3,364 | 47.9 |
| Total votes | | 7,025 | 100.0 |

Iowa Senate, District 38 General Election, 1954
| Party | Candidate | Votes | % |
|---|---|---|---|
| Republican | Arch W. McFarlane | 14,734 | 51.5 |
| Democratic | Iver Christoffersen | 13,869 | 48.5 |
| Total votes | | 28,603 | 100.0 |
| Republican hold | | | |

=== District 42 ===
Iowa Senate, District 42 General Election, 1954
| Party | Candidate | Votes | % |
|---|---|---|---|
| Republican | Frank D. Elwood | 7,726 | 59.1 |
| Democratic | Henry P. Field | 5,340 | 40.9 |
| Total votes | | 13,066 | 100.0 |
| Republican hold | | | |

=== District 44 ===
Iowa Senate, District 44 Republican Primary Election, 1954
| Party | Candidate | Votes | % |
|---|---|---|---|
| Republican | Robert R. Rigler | 3,154 | 61.3 |
| Republican | Mark Eischeid | 1,987 | 38.7 |
| Total votes | | 5,141 | 100.0 |

Iowa Senate, District 44 General Election, 1954
| Party | Candidate | Votes | % |
|---|---|---|---|
| Republican | Robert R. Rigler | 7,456 | 62.9 |
| Democratic | Bernard Speltz | 4,389 | 37.1 |
| Total votes | | 11,845 | 100.0 |
| Republican hold | | | |

=== District 45 ===
Iowa Senate, District 45 General Election, 1954
| Party | Candidate | Votes | % |
|---|---|---|---|
| Republican | Lawrence Putney | 9,554 | 56.8 |
| Democratic | Chester Hagan | 7,267 | 43.2 |
| Total votes | | 16,821 | 100.0 |
| Republican hold | | | |

=== District 48 ===
Iowa Senate, District 48 General Election, 1954
| Party | Candidate | Votes | % |
|---|---|---|---|
| Republican | Alan Vest (incumbent) | 9,310 | 56.5 |
| Democratic | Frank W. Mattes | 7,170 | 43.5 |
| Total votes | | 16,480 | 100.0 |
| Republican hold | | | |

=== District 50 ===
Iowa Senate, District 50 General Election, 1954
| Party | Candidate | Votes | % |
|---|---|---|---|
| Republican | Guy G. Butler | 9,557 | 100.0 |
| Total votes | | 9,557 | 100.0 |
| Republican hold | | | |

== See also ==
- United States elections, 1954
- United States House of Representatives elections in Iowa, 1954
- Elections in Iowa
