= Senator Dodd (disambiguation) =

Chris Dodd (born 1944) was a United States Senator from Connecticut from 1981 to 2011. Senator Dodd may also refer to:

== Members of the United States Senate ==
- Thomas J. Dodd (1907–1971), U.S. Senator from Connecticut from 1959 to 1971, father of Chris Dodd

== United States state senate members ==
- Bill Dodd (California politician) (born 1956), California State Senate
- Frank J. Dodd (1938–2010), New Jersey State Senate
- Nikiya Harris Dodd (born 1975), Wisconsin State Senate

== See also ==
- Robert R. Dodds (1924–1998), Iowa State Senate
