= Senator Main =

Senator Main may refer to:

- Franklin Main (1918–2008), Iowa State Senate
- Willett Main (1828–1902), Wisconsin State Senate
