= Charles Vernon Lisle =

American politician (1906–1982)

Charles Vernon Lisle (October 1, 1906 – April 29, 1982) was an American politician.

== Early life and career ==
Vern Lisle was born in Clarinda, Iowa, on October 1, 1906, to parents Edwin Lisle Sr. and Edith Crane. He had four siblings, three sisters and a brother. Lisle was educated in his hometown, attended the University of Iowa from 1923 to 1926, then transferred to the University of Michigan, where he graduated in 1928 with a Bachelor of Science degree in civil engineering. He then took over the leadership of family-owned manufacturing company Lisle Corporation from his father in 1936, serving as president until 1970, when he was replaced by his brother.

== Political career ==
Lisle was elected to three terms on the Clarinda school board in the 1940s, overlapping with the start of his tenure on the Iowa House of Representatives. In total, Lisle was elected to seven consecutive terms from House District 9, and served continuously from January 10, 1949, to January 13, 1963. Between January 12, 1959, and January 8, 1961, Lisle was speaker of the state house. For the 1962 Iowa Senate election, District 6 was expanded to a multi-member district, and Lisle was elected to serve alongside incumbent senator Orval C. Walter. In 1964, District 6 reverted to a single-member district, represented solely by Lisle. Lisle won a second four-year term in 1966, but left office on October 17, 1969, necessitating a special election, won by Earl Bass.

During his legislature career, Lisle was an advocate of education and community colleges. During his first legislative term, Lisle helped advance a bill on presidential primary balloting through the Iowa General Assembly. He was considered the favorite for the house speakership prior to the 58th Iowa General Assembly. After his election to the role, Lisle announced the establishment of three special committees on highway safety, reapportionment, and state planning and development. During his speakership, Lisle opposed a 1959 bill permitting dove shooting. That same year, a session of the 58th General Assembly became the first in Iowa history to cost over $1 million. In 1963, Lisle worked alongside colleagues Jack Schroeder and Howard C. Buck to review fair employment legislation.

== Death ==
Lisle died on April 29, 1982, in Atlantic, Iowa.
