= Herbert Luther Ollenburg =

American banker and politician (1911–1987)

Member of the Iowa Senate from the 4th district
- In office January 11, 1971 – January 7, 1973
- Preceded by: Quentin V. Anderson
- Succeeded by: Berl Priebe

Member of the Iowa Senate from the 43rd district
- In office January 13, 1969 – January 10, 1971
- Preceded by: John Buren
- Succeeded by: John C. Rhodes

Personal details
- Born: June 26, 1911 Garner, Iowa, U.S.
- Died: November 26, 1987 (aged 76) Mesa, Arizona, U.S.
- Party: Republican
- Spouse: Ruth M. Boehnke (m. 1933)
- Children: 2
- Education: Rutgers University
- Occupation: Politician, banker

Herbert Luther Ollenburg (June 26, 1911 – November 26, 1987) was an American banker and politician.

Herbert Luther Ollenburg was born to parents Herman and Wilhelmina Ollenburg on June 26, 1911. The family resided on a farm near Garner, Iowa. Six years after graduating from Garner High School in 1927, Ollenburg married Ruth M. Boehnke, with whom he had twins. During the 1940s, Ollenburg was active as an executive of the Garner Chamber of Commerce. Ollenburg subsequently attended the Rutgers University Stonier Graduate School of Banking. Upon completing the program in 1944, he was named president of the Hancock County National Bank. Ollenburg vacated that role in 1977. During his banking career, Ollenburg also served as secretary and chairman of Group III of the Iowa Bankers Association, and as a member of the executive council for the American Bankers' Association. He succeeded Charles Walcott as president of the Iowa Bankers Association in 1962.

Politically, Ollenburg was affiliated with the Republican Party. He served as clerk for Concord Township for twenty years, Ollenburg's tenure on the Garner–Hayfield School Board lasted fourteen years, and included twelve as president. During his stint as school board president, Garner-Hayfield High School's largest graduating class numbered 66 in 1962. He was elected to the Iowa Senate in 1968 to represent District 43. Upon his election as a state senator, Ollenburg sat on the agriculture, judiciary, schools, and ways and means committees. Between 1971 and 1973, Ollenburg held the District 4 seat, due to reapportionment. In his second term, he participated on a joint committee convened to discuss topics pertaining to both houses of the Iowa General Assembly. Ollenburg backed Chuck Grassley's 1980 United States Senate campaign. Ollenburg died in Mesa, Arizona, on November 26, 1987, aged 76.
