= Earl Bass =

American politician (1915–2002)

Earl G. Bass

Member of the Iowa Senate from the 41st district
- In office January 11, 1971 – January 7, 1973
- Preceded by: Vernon Kyhl
- Succeeded by: Bill Gluba

Member of the Iowa Senate from the 6th district
- In office November 18, 1969 – January 10, 1971
- Preceded by: Charles Vernon Lisle
- Succeeded by: George Shawer

Personal details
- Born: March 30, 1915 Strahan, Iowa, U.S.
- Died: September 18, 2002 (aged 87)
- Party: Republican
- Spouse(s): Helen Louise Christensen (m. 1943; died 1994) Marjorie Ruth Donner Dashner (m. 1995; died 1999)
- Children: 2
- Education: University of Nebraska; Tarkio College
- Occupation: Politician

Earl G. Bass (March 30, 1915 – September 18, 2002) was an American politician.

Earl Bass was born in Strahan, Iowa, on March 30, 1915, to Zeno Bass Jr. and Rena Gipe. Earl Bass graduated from Strahan High School in 1932 and attended the University of Nebraska and Tarkio College. He married Tarkio classmate Helen Louise Christensen on September 1, 1943, in Pittsburg, Kansas. After the couple had graduated, they moved to Bass's hometown. They relocated to Malvern, Iowa, after the birth of their two daughters. Earl was active in Malvern's Methodist Church, became a founding member of the Mills County Extension Council in 1955, and helped organize the local Girl Scouts troop. In 1954, Bass acquired the local grain elevator. He also farmed and raised cattle.

Politically, Bass was affiliated with the Republican Party. An inaugural member of the Malvern village board, he also served on the Malvern School Board prior to the formal establishment of the Malvern Community School District in 1960. Bass defeated Otha Wearin in a 1969 special election for a vacated Iowa Senate seat. Bass took office in District 6 on November 18, 1969, and served until January 10, 1971, when he was redistricted to District 41. Bass stepped down from the Iowa Senate on January 7, 1973. In November 1972, Bass was elected to represent Mills County on the Health Planning Council of the Midlands. Bass endorsed Chuck Grassley's first campaign for the United States Senate in 1980.

Bass's first wife Helen died on June 11, 1994, and he subsequently remarried, to Marjorie Ruth Donner Dashner on March 18, 1995. Donner Dashner died on July 24, 1999, and Bass died on September 18, 2002.
