= Charles G. Mogged =

American politician (1932–2022)

Member of the Iowa State Senate
- In office 1969–1971

Personal details
- Born: February 22, 1932 Altamont, South Dakota, U.S.
- Died: December 25, 2022 (aged 90) Carlsbad, New Mexico, U.S.
- Party: Republican
- Occupation: Farmer

Charles George Mogged (February 22, 1932 – December 25, 2022) was an American politician in the state of Iowa.

== Life and career ==
Mogged was born in Altamont, South Dakota, on February 22, 1932. He attended University of Illinois at Urbana–Champaign and was a realtor. Mogged served in the Iowa State Senate from 1969 to 1971 as a Republican. He died after a brief illness at his home in Carlsbad, New Mexico, on December 25, 2022, at the age of 90.
