= Charles Eppers =

American politician (1919–1999)

Member of the Iowa Senate from the 1st district
- In office January 12, 1959 – January 13, 1963
- Preceded by: Edward J. McManus
- Succeeded by: Seeley Lodwick

Personal details
- Born: Charles F. Eppers; September 16, 1919 Keokuk, Iowa, U.S.
- Died: January 17, 1999 (aged 79)
- Party: Democratic
- Spouse: Ferne Flambeau (m. 1975)
- Children: 4 stepchildren
- Occupation: Politician

Military service
- Allegiance: United States
- Branch/service: United States Army (United States Army Air Forces)
- Battles/wars: World War II

Charles F. Eppers (September 16, 1919 – January 17, 1999) was an American politician.

Henry Eppers and Minnie Knemeyer were both of German descent. Eppers immigrated to the United States from Germany at the age of eight, while Knemeyer was a native of Illinois. They married and raised four children, one of whom was Frederick Eppers. Frederick Eppers married Bertha, and their son Charles was born on September 16, 1919, in Keokuk, Iowa. Charles was educated in Keokuk and served in the United States Army Air Forces during World War II. Upon returning to Keokuk after the war, Eppers invested in local cafes and the eponymous Eppers Hotel.

Like his grandfather Henry, Charles Eppers was affiliated with the Democratic Party. He took office as a member of the Iowa Senate for District 1 in January 1959, and served a full four-year term through 1963. Within the senate, Eppers was a member of a steering committee formed in 1961 to increase the speed at which bills were considered, and proposed one of eleven bills on reapportionment during the session. From 1972 to 1978, Charles Eppers served as mayor of Keokuk. During his mayoralty, the Keokuk–Hamilton Bridge was planned. In 1980, he was elected to the Lee County board of supervisors. Upon his resignation, Eppers was succeeded by Jerry Kearns on January 1, 1983, who ran for a full term in his own right the next year. Charles Eppers died on January 17, 1999, aged 75.
