= Joe N. Wilson =

American politician

Member of the Iowa Senate from the 3rd district
- In office January 9, 1961 – January 10, 1965
- Preceded by: Gene Lyle Hoffman
- Succeeded by: Donald S. McGill

Personal details
- Born: Joe Nathan Wilson; November 1, 1922 Centerville, Iowa, United States
- Died: August 13, 2015 (aged 92) Centerville, Iowa, United States
- Party: Republican
- Occupation: Farmer

Joe Nathan Wilson (November 1, 1922 – August 13, 2015) was an American politician in the state of Iowa. Wilson was born in Centerville, Iowa. He attended the University of Washington Law School and was a farmer. He also served in World War II in the United States Navy. He was a Republican State Senator from Appanoose County from 1961 to 1965. Wilson died in August 2015 at the age of 92.

Iowa Senate
| Preceded by Gene Lyle Hoffman | 3rd district 1961–1965 | Succeeded by Donald S. McGill |
