= Max Mills =

American politician (1920-1998)

Member of the Iowa Senate from the 24th district
- In office January 11, 1965 – January 8, 1967
- Preceded by: Jans Dykhouse
- Succeeded by: John M. Ely

Member of the Iowa Senate from the 26th district
- In office January 9, 1967 – January 12, 1969
- Preceded by: Daryl Hallett Nims
- Succeeded by: John L. Mowry

Personal details
- Born: Max Milo Mills; August 26, 1920 Marshalltown, Iowa, U.S.
- Died: October 6, 1998 (aged 78) Marshalltown, Iowa, U.S.
- Party: Republican

Max Milo Mills (August 26, 1920 – October 6, 1998) was an American lawyer and politician.

== Early life and education ==
Mills was a native of Marshalltown, Iowa, and could trace his ancestry to the homesteaders of Marshall County. His brother Lawrence Ferguson Mills became an art historian and professor at Central College. Max Mills attended the Washington University in St. Louis, Northwestern University, and Iowa State University before graduating from the University of Chicago. He earned a Juris Doctor from the Drake University Law School.

== Military, legal, and public service career ==
Mills served in the United States Marine Corps from 1942 to 1946, starting from the rank of private and retiring from active duty with the rank of major. He returned to Iowa following the end of the Pacific War, and began practicing law during the ensuing decade, including a stint as Marshall County attorney. Mills also served as vice president of a travel agency, a transportation company, and was a cattle breeder.

Mills was a Republican member of the Iowa Senate from 1964 to 1968, representing the 24th and 26th districts for two years each. In 1966, Mills was the Republican nominee for Lieutenant Governor of Iowa, and lost a close general election race to Robert D. Fulton. Mills again contested the Republican nomination for the same post in 1968, which was won by Roger Jepsen. Governor Robert D. Ray appointed Mills to the Iowa Crime Commission. In 1969, Mills relocated to the Kansas City metropolitan area, and later returned to serve on the Iowa Development Commission.

== Death ==
Mills died in Marshalltown on October 6, 1998, aged 78.

Party political offices
Preceded by W. L. Mooty	Republican Party nominee for Lieutenant Governor of Iowa; 1966	Succeeded by Roger Jepsen
