= Francis Messerly =

American politician (1914–1994)

Member of the Iowa Senate from the 19th district
- In office January 11, 1971 – January 7, 1973
- Preceded by: Eugene Marshall Hill
- Succeeded by: Vernon Kyhl

Member of the Iowa Senate from the 32nd district
- In office January 9, 1967 – January 10, 1971
- Preceded by: Andrew G. Frommelt
- Succeeded by: Lee H. Gaudineer

Member of the Iowa Senate from the 34th district
- In office January 11, 1965 – January 8, 1967
- Preceded by: Robert D. Fulton
- Succeeded by: Hugh H. Clarke

Member of the Iowa House of Representatives from the 66th district
- In office January 9, 1961 – January 10, 1965
- Preceded by: Bernard R. Balch
- Succeeded by: Gertrude S. Cohen

Personal details
- Born: April 21, 1914 Cedar Falls, Iowa
- Died: October 8, 1994 (aged 80) Cedar Falls, Iowa
- Party: Republican

Francis LaVern Messerly (April 21, 1914 – October 8, 1994) was an American politician who served in the Iowa House of Representatives from 1961 to 1965 and in the Iowa Senate 1965 to 1973.

He died on October 8, 1994, in Cedar Falls, Iowa at age 80.
