= John Buren =

American politician (1913–1991)

Member of the Iowa Senate from the 43rd district
- In office January 9, 1967 – January 12, 1969

Member of the Iowa Senate from the 47th district
- In office January 11, 1965 – January 8, 1967

Personal details
- Born: John Leonard Buren; June 10, 1913 Leland, Iowa, U.S.
- Died: May 4, 1991 (aged 77)
- Party: Democratic
- Spouse: Thora M. Berg (m. 1933)
- Children: 2
- Education: Columbia College
- Occupation: Politician

Military service
- Allegiance: United States
- Branch/service: United States Navy
- Battles/wars: World War II

John Leonard Buren (June 10, 1913 – May 4, 1991) was an American politician.

John Buren was born in Leland, Iowa, on June 10, 1913, to parents William Pascal and Mary Elizabeth Buren. He attended the public schools in his hometown, then studied at Columbia College for two years. During World War II, Buren served a two-year stint in the United States Navy. Outside of politics, Buren worked variously as an insurance agent, livestock farmer, and ran car dealerships, as well as a grocery store.

Buren's political experience at the local level included six years each on the Leland school board and city council, and another six years as chair of the Winnebago County Democratic Party. In the 1964 Iowa Senate election, he won the 47th district seat. Two years later, Buren won reelection, after redistricting to the 43rd district.

Buren married Thora M. Berg in 1933, with whom he raised a daughter and a son. He died on May 4, 1991.
