= Leslie C. Klink =

American politician (1926–2018)

Member of the Iowa State Senate
- In office 1969–1971

Personal details
- Born: August 11, 1926 Littleport, Iowa, United States
- Died: June 22, 2018 (aged 91)
- Party: Republican
- Occupation: farmer

Leslie Clarence Klink (August 11, 1926 - June 22, 2018) was an American politician in the state of Iowa.

Klink was born in Littleport, Iowa. He attended Elkader High School and Iowa State University and following service in Korea, worked as a farmer, specialising in beef production.

He served in the Iowa State Senate from 1969 to 1971 as a Republican. He served as the Clayton County Finance Chairman for the Republican party.
