= Edward Anderson Wearin =

American politician and businessman

Edward Anderson Wearin (April 16, 1918 – October 2, 1994) was an American politician and businessman.

Born in Malvern, Iowa, Wearin moved back to Iowa after graduating from Stanford University with a BA and Harvard Business School with an MBA. He served in the Iowa State Senate from 1961 to 1965 as a Republican.
