= Vernon Kyhl =

American politician

Member of the Iowa Senate from the 19th district
- In office January 8, 1973 – September 17, 1973
- Preceded by: Francis L. Messerly
- Succeeded by: Clifford Burroughs

Member of the Iowa Senate from the 5th district
- In office January 11, 1971 – January 7, 1973
- Preceded by: James E. Briles
- Succeeded by: Ray Taylor

Member of the Iowa Senate from the 41st district
- In office January 9, 1967 – January 10, 1971
- Preceded by: Hilarius Heying
- Succeeded by: Earl G. Bass

Member of the Iowa Senate from the 42nd district
- In office January 11, 1965 – January 8, 1967
- Preceded by: Lynn Potter
- Succeeded by: Delbert W. Floy

Member of the Iowa Senate from the 39th district
- In office January 14, 1963 – January 10, 1965
- Preceded by: J. Kendall Lynes
- Succeeded by: Vincent S. Burke

Personal details
- Born: July 30, 1908 La Plata, Missouri
- Died: September 17, 1973 (aged 65) Parkersburg, Iowa
- Party: Republican

Vernon Kyhl (July 30, 1908 – September 17, 1973) was an American politician who served in the Iowa Senate from 1963 to 1973.

He died on September 17, 1973, in Parkersburg, Iowa at age 65.
