= Alan Shirley =

American politician

Member of the Iowa State Senate
- In office 1965–1971

Personal details
- Born: November 17, 1937 Perry, Iowa, U.S.
- Died: August 20, 2004 (aged 66)
- Party: Democratic
- Occupation: lawyer

Edwin Alan Shirley (November 17, 1937 – August 20, 2004) was an American politician in the state of Iowa.

Shirley was born in Perry, Iowa. He attended Drake University and is a lawyer. He served in the Iowa State Senate from 1965 to 1971 as a Democrat.
