= Stanley Heaberlin =

American politician

Member of the Iowa Senate from the 11th district
- In office January 9, 1967 – January 12, 1969
- Preceded by: Bass Van Gilst
- Succeeded by: Charles O. Laverty

Member of the Iowa Senate from the 12th district
- In office January 11, 1965 – January 8, 1967
- Preceded by: C. Edwin Gilmour
- Succeeded by: Joseph B. Flatt

Personal details
- Born: September 4, 1908 Harr, Tennessee
- Died: October 2, 1989 (aged 81)
- Party: Democratic

Stanley Heaberlin (September 4, 1908 – October 2, 1989) was an American politician who served in the Iowa Senate from 1965 to 1969.
