= Kenneth Benda (politician) =

American politician (1918–2007)

Member of the Iowa Senate from the 18th district
- In office January 9, 1967 – June 18, 1969
- Preceded by: David Shaff
- Succeeded by: Joann Yessler Orr

Member of the Iowa Senate from the 23rd district
- In office January 14, 1963 – January 8, 1967

Personal details
- Born: Kenneth John Benda; November 9, 1918 Brooklyn, Iowa, U.S.
- Died: September 30, 2007 (aged 88)
- Party: Republican
- Spouse: Lucille Roudabush (m. 1941)
- Children: 2
- Education: Iowa State College (BS); Columbia University
- Occupation: Politician, banker, realtor

Military service
- Allegiance: United States
- Branch/service: United States Navy
- Rank: Lieutenant
- Battles/wars: World War II

Kenneth John Benda (November 9, 1918 – September 30, 2007) was an American politician.

Kenneth Benda was a native of Brooklyn, Iowa, born to parents James Benda and Rose Posekany on November 9, 1918. He was educated at Jefferson Township Country School #4, graduated Hartwick High School in 1936, and earned a Bachelor of Science in forestry from Iowa State College in 1940. Benda then began working for the Tennessee Valley Authority, and married Lucille Roudabush the following year. He left the TVA in December 1942 to pursue further education at Columbia University, where he joined the United States Navy. Benda was aboard the USS Sangamon during the Pacific War. In 1946, Benda returned to Hartwick, Iowa, to begin working at the Hartwick State Bank, becoming the bank's controlling owner by 1954. He retired from Hartwick State Bank in 1991, as bank president, though he retained his position on the board of directors.

Politically, Benda was affiliated with the Republican Party, and served as chairman of the Poweshiek County branch of the party. He was first elected to the Iowa Senate for District 23 in 1962. Although Benda was reelected in 1966, this time from District 18, he did not compete his second term, opting to resign from the state senate in June 1969 and accept an appointment as chairman of the Iowa Commerce Commission, on which he served until 1971.

Benda died on September 30, 2007, at the age of 88.
