= Daryl Nims =

American politician (1923–1996)

Daryl Hallett Nims (July 18, 1923 – January 7, 1996) was an American politician.

Daryl Nims was born to parents Harold Nims and Aline Schaal on July 18, 1923, in Des Moines, Iowa. After graduating from Theodore Roosevelt High School in 1941, Nims served in World War II as a lieutenant of the United States Army Air Forces, and earned a bachelor's degree in marketing from Drake University in 1947. Nims played basketball throughout high school for the Roosevelt Roughriders, and, during his senior season was named to the Des Moines Tribune All-City team. Nims continued his collegiate basketball career with the Drake Bulldogs until 1946.

In 1951, Nims acquired the Ames branch of Mickelson's Company, a sporting goods manufacturer and retailer, which he renamed Sportsman's of Ames, and operated for 35 years. At the time, Nims had worked in the industry for five years, including one year as a sales representative for previous owner B. O. Mickelson. After retiring, Nims returned to Des Moines.

Nims was elected to the Iowa Senate in 1964, as a Democratic legislator for District 26. He ran for reelection in 1966, losing to Pearle DeHart. From 1989 to 1991, Nims was a doorman for the Iowa State Capitol. In 1992, Nims was one of seven candidates who contested the Democratic nomination for District 68 of the Iowa House of Representatives. After losing to Michael Cataldo, Nims ran in the general election as an independent candidate, again losing to Cataldo. Nims faced Cataldo in the 1994 Democratic Party primary as well, losing for a third time.

Nims died at Mercy Hospital Medical Center in Des Moines on January 7, 1996.
