= Donald S. McGill =

American politician (1906–1980)

Member of the Iowa Senate from the 3rd district
- In office January 11, 1965 – January 10, 1971
- Preceded by: Joe N. Wilson
- Succeeded by: Wayne D. Keith

Personal details
- Born: Donald Sherman McGill; July 20, 1906 Grandview, Iowa, United States
- Died: January 23, 1980 (aged 73) Chariton, Iowa, United States
- Party: Democratic
- Children: James McGill
- Education: University of Iowa

Donald S. McGill (July 20, 1906 – January 23, 1980) was an American politician from the state of Iowa.

McGill was born near Grandview, Iowa in 1906. He graduated from Grandview Consolidated High School in 1926. In 1932, he received his B.S. degree from Parsons College. He completed his education in 1938 by graduating from the University of Iowa. He served as a Democrat in the Iowa Senate from 1965 to 1971. McGill died in Chariton, Iowa, in 1980.

Iowa Senate
Preceded by Joe N. Wilson	3rd district 1965–1971	Succeeded by Wayne D. Keith
