= Max E. Reno =

American politician

Member of the Iowa Senate from the 2nd district
- In office January 11, 1965 – January 12, 1969
- Preceded by: Dewey Phelps
- Succeeded by: Charles Mogged

Personal details
- Born: April 22, 1926 Bladensburg, Iowa, United States
- Died: July 25, 2004 (aged 78) Keosauqua, Iowa, United States
- Party: Democratic

Max E. Reno (April 22, 1926 – July 25, 2004) was an American politician and World War II veteran from the state of Iowa.

Reno was born in Bladensburg, Iowa in 1926. He attended Bloomfield public schools and junior college. Reno served as a Democrat in the Iowa Senate from 1965 to 1969. He died in 2004.

Iowa Senate
Preceded by Dewey Phelps	2nd district 1965–1969	Succeeded by Charles Mogged
