= Charles Van Eaton =

American politician and businessman (1889–1974)

Charles S. Van Eaton

Member of the Iowa Senate from the 37th district
- In office 9 January 1967 – 12 January 1969
- Preceded by: Donald Beneke
- Succeeded by: Alden J. Erskine

Member of the Iowa Senate from the 32nd district
- In office 9 January 1961 – 19 January 1965 Serving with Andrew G. Frommelt
- Preceded by: Jack Miller
- Succeeded by: Andrew G. Frommelt
- In office 10 January 1949 – 13 January 1957
- Preceded by: Adrian D. Clem
- Succeeded by: Jack Miller

Personal details
- Born: 10 August 1889 Tacoma, Washington
- Died: 13 February 1974 (aged 84) Sioux City, Iowa
- Party: Republican
- Education: Graceland College

Charles S. Van Eaton (10 August 1889 – 13 February 1974) was an American politician and businessman.

== Early life and career ==
Charles S. Van Eaton was born to parents Matthew Simpson and Pearl Derry Van Eaton in Tacoma, Washington, on 10 August 1889. The Van Eaton family moved to Iowa by the time Charles was three years old, and he spent time in Iowa, as well as western Canada, as a child. Van Eaton earned degrees from Iowa Business College in Council Bluffs and Graceland College in Lamoni in 1908 and 1911, respectively.

Van Eaton acquired, owned and operated several business interests, among them a hardware store, furniture store, general store and funeral home in Pisgah, Iowa, and later opened an O. P. Skaggs franchise in Fremont, Nebraska, in 1928. He moved to Sioux City, Iowa, where he opened a chain of supermarkets in 1930, after divesting from his holdings in Fremont, Nebraska.

== Political and public service career ==
Van Eaton was a founding member of the Iowa Development Commission and held a seat on the board of directors for eight years. Between 1940 and 1941, he led the Sioux City Chamber of Commerce as president. During World War II, he was appointed to the Seventh Regional War Labor Board. Van Eaton remained active in municipal affairs throughout his time in Sioux City, receiving awards from the local branches of the Kiwanis and Salvation Army. Van Eaton was also active in the YMCA. He served for 24 years as board member of Morningside College. The institution awarded him an honorary doctorate in law. For his eighteen years of service on the municipal auditorium board, all but three as president, Van Eaton received the Golden Key to Sioux City.

Van Eaton was a member of the Republican Party who served in the Iowa House of Representatives from 1945 to 1949 for District 58. He then held the District 32 seat in the Iowa Senate for three full terms of four years each from 1949 to 1957, and 1961 to 1965, then remained a state senator for District 37 between 1965 and 1967.

In 1944, Van Eaton's campaign for the state house was supported by labor unions. During the 1946 election cycle, Van Eaton faced Harold F. Nelson and Fred E. Riddle in a Republican Party primary. In 1947, Van Eaton expressed support for an amendment to alcohol laws proposed by Waldo Fimmen. By August 1949, Van Eaton was considered a potential candidate for Lieutenant Governor of Iowa. Throughout the 1950s, Van Eaton advocated for an toll road called the Iowa Turnpike to be built. A bill providing $300 million in funding for the construction of the road was passed. At the time, it was the most expensive bill to pass the Iowa Legislature. Today, the site of the planned Iowa Turnpike is interstate 80 in Iowa. In 1953, Van Eaton served on an Iowa Senate committee advocating for regulations on the packaging and serving of margarine.

== Personal life and death ==
In August 1955, Charles Van Eaton and his wife Laura Martin Van Eaton were granted a divorce in Dade County, Florida. Charles Van Eaton died on 13 February 1974 in a Sioux City hospital.
