= Tom Riley (Iowa politician) =

American politician

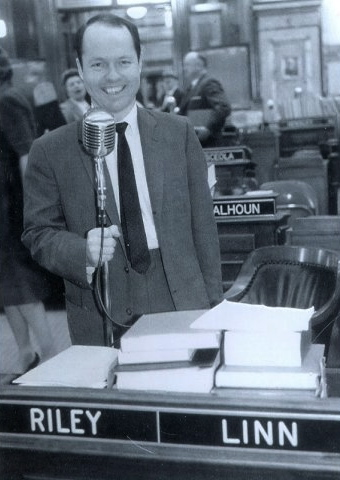
- Riley at the Iowa Legislature
- Born: January 9, 1929; Cedar Rapids, IA
- Died: July 21, 2011 (aged 82)
- Education: University of Iowa (BA), (JD)
- Occupations: Lawyer; politician
- Political party: Republican Party (until 2004); Democratic (2004–death)
- Spouse: Nancy Riley
- Relatives: Molly Brown (granddaughter)

Tom Riley (January 9, 1929 – July 21, 2011) was an American lawyer from Cedar Rapids, Iowa who served two terms in the Iowa House of Representatives and four in the Iowa Senate.

== Background ==
Riley was born in Cedar Rapids to Joseph W. Riley and Edna Kyle Riley. He graduated from Franklin High School in Cedar Rapids in 1946, then earned a B.A. and Juris Doctor degrees at the University of Iowa in 1950 and 1952 respectively. He served as first lieutenant in the Judge Advocate General's Corps of the United States Air Force during the Korean War. He became a partner in the law firm Simmons, Perrine, Albright and Ellwood. Riley left the law firm in 1980 to start the Tom Riley Law Firm with his son Peter. Riley's daughter Sara later joined his eponymous legal practice as well.

== Public service ==
He was elected to the Iowa House in 1960, and served two terms, before being elected as one of the two Senators from the 20th district (Linn County); in 1968, he challenged incumbent Democrat John Chester Culver for congressman from Iowa's 2nd congressional district, but lost by 84,634 votes to Culver's 103,651. He returned to the Senate, and would serve through 1974, when he again ran for the 2nd District Congress seat, and lost to Democrat Mike Blouin with 73,416 for Blouin, 69,088 for Riley, and 1,108 for James Whitford of the American Party. He was succeeded in the Senate by Democrat James Redmond. He again ran in 1976 against Blouin, losing by 100,344 votes to 102,980 for Blouin, 485 for an American Party candidate, and 741 for an independent.

During his time in the legislature, he sponsored a bill on equal representation in state reapportionment, the state fair housing law, and a bill outlawing discrimination in employment due to age, race, religion, or national origin. He served as a delegate to and co-sponsor of the Fourth World Conference on World Peace through Law in Bangkok in 1969. He chaired the Governor's Advisory Committee on Aging 1964-65, and the Governor's United Nations Day Committee in 1972. He served on the State Commission on Aging from 1971-73.

== Legal career ==
Tom Riley founded the Tom Riley Law Firm in 1980. The mission of the firm is to seek justice for those who have been injured or damaged by the wrongful acts of others. With this focus, the firm has grown from three lawyers at the time of its founding to its present size with offices in Cedar Rapids and Iowa City, Iowa. Over the years, the Tom Riley Law Firm has represented thousands of clients and obtained more than $300,000,000 in recoveries on their behalf.

Tom Riley and Todd Becker pioneered nationwide litigation against tampon manufacturers whose products caused injury or death by toxic shock syndrome in women. Their landmark case, Kehm v. Procter & Gamble, 724 F.2d 630 (8th Cir. 1983), became the subject of Tom Riley’s book, The Price of a Life: One Woman’s Death From Toxic Shock (Adler & Adler 1986), and a chapter in the book, Soap Opera: The Inside Story of Procter & Gamble (Random House 1993), by Wall Street Journal reporter Alecia Swasy (Random House 1993).

In the area of medical malpractice, Tom Riley and Todd Becker persuaded the Iowa Supreme Court to adopt the doctrine of lost chance of survival in DeBurkart v. Louvar, 393 N.W.2d 131 (Iowa 1986). Prior to the DeBurkart case, a patient could not recover any damages in Iowa for a physician’s negligent diagnosis or treatment of the patient’s potentially fatal condition, unless the patient could prove he or she had better than a 50/50 chance of survival before the physician’s mistake. The DeBurkart case relieved victims of medical negligence of having to meet this frequently unrealistic and unfair burden.

Riley was listed in The Best Lawyers in America.

== Personal life ==
He married Nancy Evans, whom he'd met while they were both students at the University of Iowa, in 1952; they had six children. He wrote four books: Response to Crisis (1968), Proving Punitive Damages (1981), The Price of a Life (1986) and Iowa’s Civil Litigation Handbook (1997). He is the grandfather of actress Molly Brown. He died July 21, 2011.

== Charity ==
Tom and his wife, Nan, donated an extensive collection of Roman portrait busts to the Cedar Rapids Museum of Art. In addition to the Roman busts, Mr. Riley shared his private art collection with the museum for an exhibition called "From Monet to Picasso: The Riley Collection".

Tom and Nan Riley also gave to Camp Courageous, donating a train taking campers to the camp's lake, as well as the Tom & Nan Riley Court, a basketball court for the campers for various activities.
