= Robert Burns (Iowa politician) =

American politician (1922–2001)

Robert J. Burns (22 August 1922 – 24 January 2001) was an American politician.

Robert J. Burns was born on 22 August 1922 in Iowa City, Iowa, to parents John and Regina Cash Burns. The family lived in Oxford and then Cosgrove, where Burns attended high school, graduating in 1940. He then enrolled at the University of Iowa before enlisting in the United States Army. During World War II, Burns served with the 42nd Infantry Division with the rank of sergeant. While an active duty service member, Burns studied at the University of Kansas.

Politically, Burns was affiliated with the Democratic Party. He was a member of the Johnson County board of supervisors for nine years, and won election to the Iowa Senate in 1964. He held the District 21 seat for two years, and served the latter half of his term representing District 17 due to redistricting.

Burns married Ada M. Wilson in June 1944. The couple had seven children. The family moved from Cosgrove to Iowa City in 1966. Robert J. Burns ran a consulting firm there, and was appointed to the President's Advisory Committee on Intergovernmental Relations in 1975. He died on 24 January 2001 in Cedar Rapids.
