= Lynn Potter =

American politician (1912–1982)

Lynn Potter (May 16, 1912 – March 13, 1982) was an American politician.

Lynn Potter was born in El Dorado Springs, Missouri, on May 16, 1912, to parents Effie Smith and Wallace Potter. Upon graduating from Fayette High School in Fayette, Missouri, he enrolled at Central College in the same town. Potter later studied law at John Marshall Law School in Cleveland.

Potter served in the United States Marines from December 1940 to December 1946. He married Lorraine Sullivan on October 10, 1942, with whom he had four children. The Potter family later settled in Iowa, and farmed in Winneshiek County. During this time, Lynn and Lorraine also worked as clerks of the livestock market in the city of Cresco. They subsequently moved into Cresco, where Lynn Potter operated an accounting service for two decades. Potter served on the Iowa Senate between January 12, 1959, and January 13, 1963, representing District 42 as a legislator affiliated with the Democratic Party. In 1976, Lynn and Lorraine Potter retired and returned to Missouri. Lynn Potter died at Keller Memorial Hospital in Fayette on March 13, 1982.
