= Howard Reppert =

American businessman and politician

Member of the Iowa Senate
- In office 1965–1969

Personal details
- Born: January 24, 1918 Des Moines, Iowa, U.S.
- Died: November 5, 1989 (aged 71) Sarasota, Florida, U.S.
- Party: Democratic

Howard Clinton Reppert, Jr. (January 24, 1918 – November 5, 1989) was an American businessman and politician.

Born in Des Moines, Iowa, Reppert went to the Des Moines public schools. He served as a pilot in the United States Army Air Forces during World War II. Reppert went to University of Iowa and Drake University. He was in the transfer and storage business in Des Moines. Reppert served in the Iowa House of Representatives from 1955 to 1961 and from 1963 to 1965. He then served in the Iowa Senate from 1965 to 1969 and was a Democrat. In 1971, Reppert moved to Sarasota, Florida and was involved with the real estate business. Reppert died from cancer at his home in Sarasota, Florida.
