= J. Henry Lucken =

American politician (1896–1984)

J. Henry Lucken (February 6, 1896 – June 30, 1984) was an American farmer and politician. A Republican, Lucken served in the Iowa House of Representatives from 1947 to 1961 and then served in the Iowa State Senate from 1961 to 1971.

== Biography ==
Born in Akron, Iowa, Lucken graduated from Akron High School and went to Westmar University. He served in the United States Army, with the military police, during World War I. Lucken was a farmer and was involved with the Plymouth Co-op Oil Company and the Area Federal Land Bank. Lucken served on the Johnson Township School Board. Lucken died in a hospital in Le Mars, Iowa.
