= Seeley Lodwick =

American politician

Member of the Iowa Senate from the 1st district
- In office January 14, 1963 – July 28, 1969
- Preceded by: Charles Eppers
- Succeeded by: Wilson Davis

Personal details
- Born: October 19, 1920 Evanston, Illinois
- Died: July 16, 2006 (aged 85) Wever, Iowa
- Party: Republican

Seeley G. Lodwick (October 19, 1920 – July 16, 2006) was an American politician who served in the Iowa Senate from the 1st district from 1963 to 1969. Between 1981 and 1983, Lodwick served in the United States Department of Agriculture during the Ronald Reagan presidential administration as Under Secretary for International Affairs and Commodity Programs.

He died on July 16, 2006, in Wever, Iowa at age 85.
