= Robert R. Dodds =

American politician (1924–1998)

Member of the Iowa Senate from the 7th district
- In office January 14, 1963 – January 10, 1971
- Preceded by: Frank Hoxie
- Succeeded by: Floyd Gilley

Member of the Iowa House of Representatives from the 21st district
- In office January 14, 1957 – January 13, 1963

Personal details
- Born: July 27, 1924 Burlington, Iowa, U.S.
- Died: January 1, 1998 (aged 73) Iowa City, Iowa, U.S.
- Party: Democratic
- Spouse: Frances M. Floyd (m. 1965)
- Children: 5
- Education: Burlington Junior College
- Occupation: Politician

Military service
- Allegiance: United States
- Branch/service: United States Army (United States Army Air Forces)
- Battles/wars: World War II

Robert R. Dodds (July 27, 1924 – January 1, 1998) was an American politician.

A Burlington, Iowa, native born on July 27, 1924, to parents Horace Dodds and Florence Hillgartner, Robert R. Dodds graduated from Danville High School in 1942. After serving in the United States Army Air Forces for two and a half years during World War II, Dodds enrolled at Burlington Junior College. He was a farmer and owned an eponymous insurance agency.

Dodds was elected to three two-year terms as a Democratic legislator on the Iowa House of Representatives for District 21 from 1957 to 1963. He subsequently served two consecutive terms on the Iowa Senate for District 7 until 1971. Dodds then became a minister for the Bonaparte Baptist Church, served in the Burlington Police Department Chaplain Corps, held a chaplaincy for the Burlington Bees and worked as chaplain coordinator for the Midwest League. Additionally, Dodds established several local religious organizations, publications, and initiatives. He served on the board for a number of local groups as well, such as the Salvation Army, the Danville Bank and school system, and the Southeastern Community College Foundation. Dodds died of pneumonia complications at the University of Iowa Hospitals and Clinics on January 1, 1998, aged 73.
