= Iowa's 43rd Senate district =

American legislative district

Senate District 43
- Type: District of the Upper House
- Location: Eastern Iowa
- Senator: Zach Wahls (D)
- Parent organization: Iowa General Assembly

The 43rd District of the Iowa Senate is located in southeastern Iowa, and is currently composed of part of Johnson County.

== Current elected officials ==
Zach Wahls is the senator currently representing the 43rd District.

The area of the 43rd District contains two Iowa House of Representatives districts:

- The 85th District (represented by Amy Nielsen)
- The 86th District (represented by David Jacoby)

The district is also located in Iowa's 1st congressional district, which is represented by Mariannette Miller-Meeks.

== Past senators ==
The district has previously been represented by:

- Sherman G. Smith, 1862–1864
- George W. Bassett, 1864–1866
- John G. Patterson, 1866–1872
- Alonzo Converse, 1872–1876
- Arad Hitchcock, 1876
- William Larrabee, 1878–1884
- John D. Glass, 1884–1888
- Norman V. Brower, 1888–1896
- Walter F. Harriman, 1896–1904
- Abner H. Gale, 1904–1909
- John Hammill, 1909–1913
- Thomas J.B. Robinson, 1913–1917
- Arthur L. Rule, 1917–1921
- John E. Wichman, 1921–1925
- Charles Frederic Johnston, 1925–1929
- Edward W. Clark, 1929–1933
- William C. McArthur, 1933–1937
- Earl M. Dean, 1937–1941
- Oscar E. Johnson, 1941–1945
- Herman M. Knudson, 1945–1957
- William H. Tate, 1957–1959
- Walter E. Edelen, 1959–1961
- Leigh Raymond Curran, 1961–1965
- Raymond W. Hagie, 1965–1967
- John Leonard Buren, 1967–1969
- Herbert Luther Ollenburg, 1969–1971
- John C. Rhodes, 1971–1973
- Lowell L. Jurkins, 1973–1983
- Thomas Mann, 1983–1990
- Florence Buhr, 1991–1992
- Derryl McLaren, 1993–2001
- Hubert Houser, 2001–2003
- Joe Seng, 2003–2012
- Joe Bolkcom, 2013–2022
- Zach Wahls, 2023–Present

== Recent election results from statewide races ==
Year	Office	Results
2008	President	Obama 68–30%
2012	President	Obama 66–34%
2016	President	Clinton 64–28%
2016	Senate	Judge 55–41%
2018	Governor	Hubbell 70–28%
2018	Attorney General	Miller 84–16%
2018	Secretary of State	DeJear 66–31%
2018	Treasurer	Fitzgerald 72–26%
2018	Auditor	Sand 70–27%
2020	President	Biden 70–28%
2020	Senate	Greenfield 68–30%
2022	Senate	Franken 70–30%
2022	Governor	DeJear 67–30%
2022	Attorney General	Miller 73–27%
2022	Secretary of State	Miller 66–34%
2022	Treasurer	Fitzgerald 71–29%
2022	Auditor	Sand 73–27%
2024	President	Harris 68–30%

== See also ==
- Iowa General Assembly
- Iowa Senate
