= John A. Walker (Iowa politician) =

American politician (1912–2012)

Member of the Iowa House of Representatives for the 63rd district
- In office 1947–1955

Member of the Iowa State Senate
- In office 1955–1967

Personal details
- Born: June 5, 1912 Hamilton County, Iowa, United States
- Died: June 21, 2012 (aged 100) Webster City, Iowa, United States
- Party: Republican
- Occupation: Farmer, banker

John Asher Walker (June 5, 1912 – June 21, 2012) was an American politician in the state of Iowa.

Walker was born in Hamilton County, Iowa. He attended Ellsworth Junior College, the American Institute of Business, and Grinnell College, and was a farmer, banker and former employee at J.C. Penney. Walker served in the House of Representatives as a Republican from 1947 to 1955 (district 63), and in the State Senate from 1955 to 1967 (districts 37 and 35). He married Violet Michaels and with her had three children. They would later divorce, and he married Margaret Moeller in 1971. He died on June 21, 2012, at the age of 100 and is buried in Jewell, Iowa.
