= Franklin Main =

American politician

Franklin Smith Main (3 November 1918 – 10 December 2008) was an American politician.

Main was born on 3 November 1918 in Mount Ayr, Iowa, and attended high school in his hometown, graduating in 1934. In 1937, he married Louise Burchett. The couple raised a daughter and a son and farmed in Bloomington Township, Decatur County, Iowa. Main was affiliated with the Democratic Party and served on the Iowa House of Representatives from 1957 to 1963, for District 6. In 1962, Main was elected to the Iowa Senate from District 5. Two years later, he was redistricted and represented District 4 until his retirement from politics in 1969. In retirement, Main relocated to Overland Park, Kansas, where he died at the Vintage Park Assisted Living facility on 10 December 2008.
