= Jack Schroeder =

American politician

Member of the Iowa House of Representatives for the 43rd district
- In office 1951–1955

Member of the Iowa State Senate
- In office 1955–1967

Personal details
- Born: August 21, 1925 Davenport, Iowa, United States
- Died: December 19, 2017 (aged 92) Sarasota, Florida, United States
- Party: Republican
- Occupation: lawyer

Jack Schroeder (August 21, 1925 – December 19, 2017) was an American politician in the state of Iowa.

Schroeder was born in Davenport, Iowa. He attended law school at Drake University and was a lawyer. He was also a former chairman of the board of directors and chief executive officer of General Life of Iowa Investment Company and General Life of Iowa Insurance Company. He is also a veteran of the U.S. Navy Air Forces. Schroeder served in the Iowa House from 1951 to 1955 for district 43, and in the State Senate from 1955 to 1967. In the Senate, he represented District 21 from 1955 to 1963, and District 17 from 1963 to 1967. In the 58th Iowa General Assembly, he was majority leader of the Senate.
