= David Shaff =

American politician

Member of the Iowa Senate from the 18th district 22nd district (1955–1963)
- In office 1955–1967

Member of the Iowa House of Representatives from the 45th district
- In office 1953–1955

Personal details
- Born: February 18, 1924 Clinton, Iowa
- Died: September 14, 2011 (aged 87)
- Party: Republican
- Children: 4
- Education: University of Iowa

David O. Shaff (February 18, 1924 – September 14, 2011) was a state legislator of Iowa who proposed the rejected Shaff Plan in 1963. He was from Clinton, Iowa. After serving in the United States Air Force in World War II, he attended the University of Iowa, where he obtained both a Bachelor of Arts and a Juris Doctor. He served one term in the Iowa House of Representatives, from 1953 to 1955, before serving three terms in the Iowa Senate, from 1955 to 1967.
