= Andrew G. Frommelt =

American politician (1921–2017)

Member of the Iowa House of Representatives for the 69th district
- In office 1953–1959

Member of the Iowa Senate from the 35th district
- In office 1959–1971

Personal details
- Born: October 18, 1921 Dubuque County, Iowa, U.S.
- Died: April 26, 2017 (aged 95)
- Party: Democratic
- Occupation: insurance representative, real estate broker

Andrew George Frommelt (October 18, 1921 – April 26, 2017) was an American politician in the state of Iowa.

Frommelt was born in Dubuque County, Iowa. He was a labor and insurance representative as well as a real estate broker. He served in the Iowa House of Representatives for district 69 from 1953 to 1959, and in the Iowa Senate from district 35 from 1959 to 1971. He was married and had a son and a daughter.

Party political offices
Preceded by Robert D. Fulton	Democratic nominee for Lieutenant Governor of Iowa; 1968	Succeeded by Minnette Doderer
