= 1972 Iowa Senate election =

- November 7, 1972

50 out of 50 seats in the Iowa State Senate 26 seats needed for a majority
| | Majority party | Minority party |
|---|---|---|
| Leader | Clifton C. Lamborn | Lee H. Gaudineer |
| Party | Republican | Democratic |
| Leader's seat | 12th | 32nd (retired) |
| Last election | 38 | 12 |
| Seats before | 37 | 13 (Note: Democrat George William "Bill" Gross won a special election in March 1971 to fill a vacancy in District 11 that had been held by Republican Charles K. Sullivan.) |
| Seats after | 28 | 22 |
| Seat change | ▼9 | ▲9 |
Majority Leader before election
Clifton C. Lamborn
Republican
Elected Majority Leader
Clifton C. Lamborn
Republican

The 1972 Iowa State Senate elections took place as part of the biennial 1972 United States elections. Iowa voters elected state senators in all of the state senate's 50 districts—the 25 even-numbered seats were up for regularly scheduled four-year terms and, due to the oddities of redistricting following the 1970 Census, the 25 odd-numbered seats were up for shortened two-year terms. State senators typically serve four-year terms in the Iowa State Senate, with half of the seats traditionally up for election each cycle. The decennial census and redistricting process disrupts one cycle each decade.

The Iowa General Assembly provides statewide maps of each district. To compare the effect of the 1971 redistricting process on the location of each district, contrast the previous map with the map used for the 1972 elections.

The primary election on June 6, 1972 determined which candidates appeared on the November 7, 1972 general election ballot. The Iowa Secretary of State only provides the names of candidates who ran in the 1972 primaries and does not report vote tallies. The primary candidates' names can be obtained here. General election results can be obtained here.

Following the previous election, Republicans had control of the Iowa state Senate, with 38 seats, and Democrats had 12 seats. In March 1971, a special election in district 11 resulted in G. William "Bill" Gross flipping a seat in favor of the Democrats. Therefore, on election day in November 1972, Republicans controlled 37 seats and Democrats had 13.

To claim control of the chamber from Republicans, the Democrats needed to net 13 Senate seats.

Republicans maintained control of the Iowa State Senate following the 1972 general election with the balance of power shifting to Republicans holding 28 seats and Democrats having 22 seats (a net gain of 9 seats for the Democrats).

== Summary of Results ==
- NOTE: The 25 even-numbered districts were up for four-year terms and the 25 odd-numbered districts were up for two-year terms due to the 1971 redistricting process.
- An asterisk (*) after a senator's name indicates they were an incumbent re-elected, but to a new district number due to redistricting.

| State senate district | Incumbent | Party | Elected senator | Party |
|---|---|---|---|---|
| 1st | Lucas DeKoster | Rep | Lucas DeKoster | Republican |
| 2nd | Marvin Wesley Smith | Rep | Irvin L. Bergman | Republican |
| 3rd | Wayne Dalton Keith | Rep | Warren E. Curtis | Republican |
| 4th | Herbert Luther Ollenburg | Rep | Berl Priebe | Democratic |
| 5th | Vernon Kyhl | Rep | Ray Taylor | Republican |
| 6th | George L. Shawver | Rep | Kenneth D. Scott | Democratic |
| 7th | Floyd Arthur Gilley | Rep | Ralph Farnham McCartney | Republican |
| 8th | S. J. Brownlee | Rep | Hilarius Louis Heying | Democratic |
| 9th | Leigh Raymond Curran | Rep | Dale L. Tieden | Republican |
| 10th | Ralph Wilson Potter | Rep | Mike Blouin | Democratic |
| 11th | George William Gross | Dem | Gene Kennedy* (Note: Redistricted from district 26 to 11.) | Democratic |
| 12th | Alden J. Erskine | Rep | Clifton C. Lamborn* (Note: Redistricted from district 24 to 12.) | Republican |
| 13th | John Wesley Graham | Rep | Tom Riley* (Note: Redistricted from district 23 to 13.) | Republican |
| 14th | Arthur Neu | Rep | Cloyd E. Robinson* (Note: Redistricted from district 22 to 14.) | Democratic |
| 15th | C. Joseph Coleman | Dem | Ralph Wilson Potter* (Note: Redistricted from district 10 to 15.) | Republican |
| 16th | James A. Potgeter | Rep | James V. Gallagher | Democratic |
| 17th | Rudy Van Drie | Rep | Barton L. Schwieger | Republican |
| 18th | John L. Mowry | Rep | Bill Hansen | Republican |
| 19th | Francis Messerly (Note: Messerly was redistricted to district 18, but lost the 18th district Republican primary to Bill Hansen.) | Rep | Vernon Kyhl* (Note: Redistricted from district 5 to 19.) | Republican |
| 20th | Willa Charlene Conklin | Rep | Elizabeth Ruby Miller | Republican |
| 21st | Charles Balloun | Rep | John S. Murray | Republican |
| 22nd | Cloyd E. Robinson | Dem | Jack Nystrom | Republican |
| 23rd | Tom Riley | Rep | C. Joseph Coleman* (Note: Redistricted from district 15 to 23.) | Democratic |
| 24th | Clifton C. Lamborn | Rep | William P. Winkelman | Republican |
| 25th | John M. Walsh | Rep | E. Kevin Kelly | Republican |
| 26th | Gene Kennedy | Dem | Leonard C. Andersen | Republican |
| 27th | James Schaben | Dem | James Schaben | Democratic |
| 28th | R. Dean Arbuckle | Rep | Karl Nolin | Democratic |
| 29th | Reinhold O. Carlson | Rep | Norman Rodgers | Democratic |
| 30th | William D. Palmer | Dem | William N. Plymat | Republican |
| 31st | George F. Milligan | Rep | Earl Willits | Democratic |
| 32nd | Lee H. Gaudineer | Dem | William D. Palmer* (Note: Redistricted from district 30 to 32.) | Democratic |
| 33rd | John E. Tapscott | Dem | George F. Milligan* (Note: Redistricted from district 31 to 33.) | Republican |
| 34th | Eugene Marshall Hill | Dem | George Kinley | Democratic |
| 35th | Minnette Doderer | Dem | Eugene Marshall Hill* (Note: Redistricted from district 34 to 35.) | Democratic |
| 36th | William R. Rabedeaux | Rep | Joann Yessler Orr | Democratic |
| 37th | Roger John Shaff | Rep | Minnette Doderer* (Note: Redistricted from district 35 to 37.) | Democratic |
| 38th | Edward E. Nicholson | Rep | William R. Rabedeaux* (Note: Redistricted from district 36 to 38.) | Republican |
| 39th | Harold A. Thordsen | Rep | Roger John Shaff* (Note: Redistricted from district 37 to 39.) | Republican |
| 40th | James W. Griffin | Rep | Elizabeth Orr Shaw | Republican |
| 41st | Earl G. Bass (Note: Bass was redistricted to district 49, but lost the 49th district Republican primary to Calvin Hultman.) | Rep | Bill Gluba | Democratic |
| 42nd | James E. Briles | Rep | Charles Peter Miller* (Note: Redistricted from district 46 to 42.) | Democratic |
| 43rd | John C. Rhodes | Rep | Lowell Junkins | Democratic |
| 44th | Bass Van Gilst | Dem | Forrest Schwengels | Republican |
| 45th | Richard Lytle Stephens (Note: Stephens was redistricted to district 44, but lost the 44th district Republican primary to Forrest Schwengels.) | Rep | Gene W. Glenn* (Note: Redistricted from district 49 to 45.) | Democratic |
| 46th | Charles Peter Miller | Dem | Bass Van Gilst* (Note: Redistricted from district 44 to 46.) | Democratic |
| 47th | Charles O. Laverty | Rep | Richard Ramsey (Note: Republican James B. Turner was deceased and won the November general election in district 47. In a December special election, Richard Ramsey won to hold the seat for the Republican Party.) | Republican |
| 48th | Quentin V. Anderson | Rep | James E. Briles* (Note: Redistricted from district 42 to 48.) | Republican |
| 49th | Gene W. Glenn | Dem | Calvin Hultman | Republican |
| 50th | Wilson Lloyd Davis | Rep | James W. Griffin* (Note: Redistricted from district 40 to 50.) | Republican |

== Detailed Results ==
- Reminder: All even-numbered Iowa Senate seats were up for four-year terms and all odd-numbered seats were up for two-year terms in 1972 due to the oddities caused by redistricting.
- Note: The Iowa Secretary of State only lists the names of 1972 primary candidates, instead of actual election results. Only general election vote tallies are provided.

=== District 1 ===
Iowa Senate, District 1 general election, 1972
| Party | Candidate | Votes | % |
|---|---|---|---|
| Republican | Lucas DeKoster (incumbent) | 17,128 | 70.6 |
| Democratic | Harry G. Kobes | 7,129 | 29.4 |
| Total votes | | 24,257 | 100.0 |
| Republican hold | | | |

=== District 2 ===
Iowa Senate, District 2 general election, 1972
| Party | Candidate | Votes | % |
|---|---|---|---|
| Republican | Irvin L. Bergman | 13,566 | 59.1 |
| Democratic | H. Kenneth Nurse | 9,405 | 40.9 |
| Total votes | | 22,971 | 100.0 |
| Republican hold | | | |

=== District 3 ===
Iowa Senate, District 3 general election, 1972
| Party | Candidate | Votes | % |
|---|---|---|---|
| Republican | Warren E. Curtis | 13,281 | 57.8 |
| Democratic | Elwood Lund | 9,700 | 42.2 |
| Total votes | | 22,981 | 100.0 |
| Republican hold | | | |

=== District 4 ===
Iowa Senate, District 4 general election, 1972
| Party | Candidate | Votes | % |
|---|---|---|---|
| Democratic | Berl Priebe | 14,008 | 56.2 |
| Republican | Wayne D. Keith (incumbent) (Note: Redistricted from district 3 to 4.) | 10,939 | 43.8 |
| Total votes | | 24,947 | 100.0 |
| Democratic gain from Republican | | | |

=== District 5 ===
Iowa Senate, District 5 general election, 1972
| Party | Candidate | Votes | % |
|---|---|---|---|
| Republican | Ray Taylor | 13,091 | 58.1 |
| Democratic | Rocky LaValle | 9,445 | 41.9 |
| Total votes | | 22,536 | 100.0 |
| Republican hold | | | |

=== District 6 ===
Iowa Senate, District 6 general election, 1972
| Party | Candidate | Votes | % |
|---|---|---|---|
| Democratic | Kenneth D. Scott | 13,303 | 52.9 |
| Republican | Leigh R. Curran (incumbent) (Note: Redistricted from district 9 to 6.) | 11,834 | 47.1 |
| Total votes | | 25,137 | 100.0 |
| Democratic gain from Republican | | | |

=== District 7 ===
Iowa Senate, District 7 general election, 1972
| Party | Candidate | Votes | % |
|---|---|---|---|
| Republican | Ralph F. McCartney | 14,073 | 59.6 |
| Democratic | Orley J. Mayfield | 9,531 | 40.4 |
| Total votes | | 23,604 | 100.0 |
| Republican hold | | | |

=== District 8 ===
Iowa Senate, District 8 general election, 1972
| Party | Candidate | Votes | % |
|---|---|---|---|
| Democratic | H. L. Heying | 12,363 | 49.9 |
| Republican | George L. Shawver (incumbent) (Note: Redistricted from district 6 to 8.) | 11,995 | 48.5 |
| Independent | Kenneth V. Fink | 395 | 1.6 |
| Total votes | | 24,753 | 100.0 |
| Democratic gain from Republican | | | |

=== District 9 ===
Iowa Senate, District 9 general election, 1972
| Party | Candidate | Votes | % |
|---|---|---|---|
| Republican | Dale L. Tieden | 13,529 | 61.7 |
| Democratic | George Leonard | 8,393 | 38.3 |
| Total votes | | 21,922 | 100.0 |
| Republican hold | | | |

=== District 10 ===
Iowa Senate, District 10 general election, 1972
| Party | Candidate | Votes | % |
|---|---|---|---|
| Democratic | Michael T. Blouin | 12,500 | 53.8 |
| Republican | John M. Walsh (incumbent) (Note: Redistricted from district 25 to 10.) | 10,753 | 46.2 |
| Total votes | | 23,253 | 100.0 |
| Democratic gain from Republican | | | |

=== District 11 ===
Iowa Senate, District 11 general election, 1972
| Party | Candidate | Votes | % |
|---|---|---|---|
| Democratic | Gene V. Kennedy (incumbent) | 11,358 | 53.4 |
| Republican | Raymond J. Taylor | 9,909 | 46.6 |
| Total votes | | 21,267 | 100.0 |
| Democratic hold | | | |

=== District 12 ===
Iowa Senate, District 12 general election, 1972
| Party | Candidate | Votes | % |
|---|---|---|---|
| Republican | Clifton C. Lamborn (incumbent) | 13,025 | 61.1 |
| Democratic | Barbara Marland | 8,278 | 38.9 |
| Total votes | | 21,303 | 100.0 |
| Republican hold | | | |

=== District 13 ===
Iowa Senate, District 13 general election, 1972
| Party | Candidate | Votes | % |
|---|---|---|---|
| Republican | Tom Riley (incumbent) | 14,334 | 59.5 |
| Democratic | John M. Ely, Jr. | 9,747 | 40.5 |
| Total votes | | 24,081 | 100.0 |
| Republican hold | | | |

=== District 14 ===
Iowa Senate, District 14 general election, 1972
| Party | Candidate | Votes | % |
|---|---|---|---|
| Democratic | Cloyd E. Robinson (incumbent) | 11,827 | 54.3 |
| Republican | Gay Dahn | 9,939 | 45.7 |
| Total votes | | 21,766 | 100.0 |
| Democratic gain from Republican | | | |

=== District 15 ===
Iowa Senate, District 15 general election, 1972
| Party | Candidate | Votes | % |
|---|---|---|---|
| Republican | Ralph W. Potter (incumbent) | 13,307 | 58.8 |
| Democratic | Bernard Beuter | 9,308 | 41.2 |
| Total votes | | 22,615 | 100.0 |
| Republican gain from Democratic | | | |

=== District 16 ===
Iowa Senate, District 16 general election, 1972
| Party | Candidate | Votes | % |
|---|---|---|---|
| Democratic | James Gallagher | 10,827 | 53.4 |
| Republican | Fred Cherry | 9,437 | 46.6 |
| Total votes | | 20,264 | 100.0 |
| Democratic gain from Republican | | | |

=== District 17 ===
Iowa Senate, District 17 general election, 1972
| Party | Candidate | Votes | % |
|---|---|---|---|
| Republican | Barton L. Schwieger | 13,045 | 57.7 |
| Democratic | Stephen M. Peterson | 9,570 | 42.3 |
| Total votes | | 22,615 | 100.0 |
| Republican hold | | | |

=== District 18 ===
Iowa Senate, District 18 general election, 1972
| Party | Candidate | Votes | % |
|---|---|---|---|
| Republican | Willard R. "Bill" Hansen | 13,419 | 58.0 |
| Democratic | Charles J. Uban | 9,726 | 42.0 |
| Total votes | | 23,145 | 100.0 |
| Republican hold | | | |

=== District 19 ===
Iowa Senate, District 19 general election, 1972
| Party | Candidate | Votes | % |
|---|---|---|---|
| Republican | Vernon H. Kyhl (incumbent) | 15,917 | 69.2 |
| Democratic | William Hamm | 6,960 | 30.2 |
| Independent | Robert Lauer | 133 | 0.6 |
| Total votes | | 23,010 | 100.0 |
| Republican hold | | | |

=== District 20 ===
Iowa Senate, District 20 general election, 1972
| Party | Candidate | Votes | % |
|---|---|---|---|
| Republican | Elizabeth R. Miller | 13,879 | 61.1 |
| Democratic | Robert E. Rider | 8,847 | 38.9 |
| Total votes | | 22,726 | 100.0 |
| Republican hold | | | |

=== District 21 ===
Iowa Senate, District 21 general election, 1972
| Party | Candidate | Votes | % |
|---|---|---|---|
| Republican | John S. Murray | 13,841 | 52.0 |
| Democratic | Barbara A. Koerber | 12,787 | 48.0 |
| Total votes | | 26,628 | 100.0 |
| Republican hold | | | |

=== District 22 ===
Iowa Senate, District 22 general election, 1972
| Party | Candidate | Votes | % |
|---|---|---|---|
| Republican | John N. "Jack" Nystrom | 13,658 | 59.0 |
| Democratic | George E. Uthe | 9,510 | 41.0 |
| Total votes | | 23,168 | 100.0 |
| Republican gain from Democratic | | | |

=== District 23 ===
Iowa Senate, District 23 general election, 1972
| Party | Candidate | Votes | % |
|---|---|---|---|
| Democratic | C. Joseph Coleman (incumbent) | 13,587 | 60.1 |
| Republican | William H. Goodrich | 9,026 | 39.9 |
| Total votes | | 22,613 | 100.0 |
| Democratic gain from Republican | | | |

=== District 24 ===
Iowa Senate, District 24 general election, 1972
| Party | Candidate | Votes | % |
|---|---|---|---|
| Republican | William P. Winkelman | 10,386 | 62.1 |
| Democratic | W. E. Conard | 6,328 | 37.9 |
| Total votes | | 16,714 | 100.0 |
| Republican hold | | | |

=== District 25 ===
Iowa Senate, District 25 general election, 1972
| Party | Candidate | Votes | % |
|---|---|---|---|
| Republican | E. Kevin Kelly | 12,487 | 56.3 |
| Democratic | Vincent S. Burke | 9,711 | 43.7 |
| Total votes | | 22,198 | 100.0 |
| Republican hold | | | |

=== District 26 ===
Iowa Senate, District 26 general election, 1972
| Party | Candidate | Votes | % |
|---|---|---|---|
| Republican | Leonard C. Andersen | 10,556 | 50.8 |
| Democratic | William Gross (incumbent) (Note: Redistricted from district 11 to 26.) | 10,207 | 49.2 |
| Total votes | | 20,763 | 100.0 |
| Republican gain from Democratic | | | |

=== District 27 ===
Iowa Senate, District 27 general election, 1972
| Party | Candidate | Votes | % |
|---|---|---|---|
| Democratic | James F. Schaben (incumbent) | 13,724 | 60.3 |
| Republican | Jewell Waugh | 9,022 | 39.7 |
| Total votes | | 22,746 | 100.0 |
| Democratic hold | | | |

=== District 28 ===
Iowa Senate, District 28 general election, 1972
| Party | Candidate | Votes | % |
|---|---|---|---|
| Democratic | Karl Nolin | 12,248 | 54.4 |
| Republican | R. Dean Arbuckle (incumbent) | 10,257 | 45.6 |
| Total votes | | 22,505 | 100.0 |
| Democratic gain from Republican | | | |

=== District 29 ===
Iowa Senate, District 29 general election, 1972
| Party | Candidate | Votes | % |
|---|---|---|---|
| Democratic | Norman G. Rodgers | 13,718 | 54.9 |
| Republican | Gene Summerson | 11,281 | 45.1 |
| Total votes | | 24,999 | 100.0 |
| Democratic gain from Republican | | | |

=== District 30 ===
Iowa Senate, District 30 general election, 1972
| Party | Candidate | Votes | % |
|---|---|---|---|
| Republican | William N. Plymat | 14,616 | 52.4 |
| Democratic | Charles H. Day | 13,260 | 47.6 |
| Total votes | | 27,876 | 100.0 |
| Republican gain from Democratic | | | |

=== District 31 ===
Iowa Senate, District 31 general election, 1972
| Party | Candidate | Votes | % |
|---|---|---|---|
| Democratic | Earl M. Willits | 13,577 | 59.3 |
| Republican | Charles W. Vanderlinden, Jr. | 9,306 | 40.7 |
| Total votes | | 22,883 | 100.0 |
| Democratic gain from Republican | | | |

=== District 32 ===
Iowa Senate, District 32 general election, 1972
| Party | Candidate | Votes | % |
|---|---|---|---|
| Democratic | William D. Palmer (incumbent) | 15,791 | 74.7 |
| Republican | James E. Blaney | 5,336 | 25.3 |
| Total votes | | 21,127 | 100.0 |
| Democratic hold | | | |

=== District 33 ===
Iowa Senate, District 33 general election, 1972
| Party | Candidate | Votes | % |
|---|---|---|---|
| Republican | George F. Milligan (incumbent) | 16,733 | 60.5 |
| Democratic | Kenneth Larson | 10,912 | 39.5 |
| Total votes | | 27,645 | 100.0 |
| Republican gain from Democratic | | | |

=== District 34 ===
Iowa Senate, District 34 general election, 1972
| Party | Candidate | Votes | % |
|---|---|---|---|
| Democratic | George R. Kinley | 14,056 | 68.4 |
| Republican | Joseph S. Kelly | 6,494 | 31.6 |
| Total votes | | 20,550 | 100.0 |
| Democratic hold | | | |

=== District 35 ===
Iowa Senate, District 35 general election, 1972
| Party | Candidate | Votes | % |
|---|---|---|---|
| Democratic | Eugene M. Hill (incumbent) | 13,011 | 51.6 |
| Republican | Gerrit Van Roekel | 11,760 | 46.6 |
| American Independent | Lorin Oxley | 447 | 1.8 |
| Total votes | | 25,218 | 100.0 |
| Democratic hold | | | |

=== District 36 ===
Iowa Senate, District 36 general election, 1972
| Party | Candidate | Votes | % |
|---|---|---|---|
| Democratic | Joan Orr | 12,471 | 54.7 |
| Republican | Charles F. Balloun (incumbent) (Note: Redistricted from district 21 to 36.) | 10,309 | 45.3 |
| Total votes | | 22,780 | 100.0 |
| Democratic gain from Republican | | | |

=== District 37 ===
Iowa Senate, District 37 general election, 1972
| Party | Candidate | Votes | % |
|---|---|---|---|
| Democratic | Minnette Doderer (incumbent) | 18,584 | 65.1 |
| Republican | Marion R. Neely | 9,964 | 34.9 |
| Total votes | | 28,548 | 100.0 |
| Democratic gain from Republican | | | |

=== District 38 ===
Iowa Senate, District 38 general election, 1972
| Party | Candidate | Votes | % |
|---|---|---|---|
| Republican | W. R. Rabedeaux (incumbent) | 12,111 | 60.0 |
| Democratic | Eleanor Anstey | 8,089 | 40.0 |
| Total votes | | 20,200 | 100.0 |
| Republican hold | | | |

=== District 39 ===
Iowa Senate, District 39 general election, 1972
| Party | Candidate | Votes | % |
|---|---|---|---|
| Republican | Roger J. Shaff (incumbent) | 12,537 | 56.6 |
| Democratic | Donald R. Arenz | 9,609 | 43.4 |
| Total votes | | 22,146 | 100.0 |
| Republican hold | | | |

=== District 40 ===
Iowa Senate, District 40 general election, 1972
| Party | Candidate | Votes | % |
|---|---|---|---|
| Republican | Elizabeth Shaw | 15,517 | 59.2 |
| Democratic | Bruce Q. Buerkens | 9,953 | 38.0 |
| Independent | Frank L. Volante | 734 | 2.8 |
| Total votes | | 26,204 | 100.0 |
| Republican hold | | | |

=== District 41 ===
Iowa Senate, District 41 general election, 1972
| Party | Candidate | Votes | % |
|---|---|---|---|
| Democratic | William E. "Bill" Gluba | 11,545 | 58.8 |
| Republican | Harold A. Thordsen (incumbent) (Note: Redistricted from district 39 to 41.) | 8,082 | 41.2 |
| Total votes | | 19,627 | 100.0 |
| Democratic gain from Republican | | | |

=== District 42 ===
Iowa Senate, District 42 general election, 1972
| Party | Candidate | Votes | % |
|---|---|---|---|
| Democratic | Charles P. Miller (incumbent) | 12,046 | 53.6 |
| Republican | Dean O. Corey | 10,422 | 46.4 |
| Total votes | | 22,468 | 100.0 |
| Democratic gain from Republican | | | |

=== District 43 ===
Iowa Senate, District 43 general election, 1972
| Party | Candidate | Votes | % |
|---|---|---|---|
| Democratic | Lowell L. Junkins | 11,467 | 50.1 |
| Republican | Wilson L. Davis (incumbent) (Note: Redistricted from district 50 to 43.) | 11,407 | 49.9 |
| Total votes | | 22,874 | 100.0 |
| Democratic gain from Republican | | | |

=== District 44 ===
Iowa Senate, District 44 general election, 1972
| Party | Candidate | Votes | % |
|---|---|---|---|
| Republican | Forrest V. Schwengels | 14,787 | 62.5 |
| Democratic | Norbert J. Flanders | 8,885 | 37.5 |
| Total votes | | 23,672 | 100.0 |
| Republican gain from Democratic | | | |

=== District 45 ===
Iowa Senate, District 45 general election, 1972
| Party | Candidate | Votes | % |
|---|---|---|---|
| Democratic | Gene W. Glenn (incumbent) | 14,956 | 61.9 |
| Republican | Arthur E. Minor | 8,795 | 36.5 |
| American Independent | Eric Bremen | 393 | 1.6 |
| Total votes | | 24,144 | 100.0 |
| Democratic gain from Republican | | | |

=== District 46 ===
Iowa Senate, District 46 general election, 1972
| Party | Candidate | Votes | % |
|---|---|---|---|
| Democratic | Bass Van Gilst (incumbent) | 13,162 | 54.0 |
| Republican | John C. Rhodes (incumbent) (Note: Redistricted from district 43 to 46.) | 11,230 | 46.0 |
| Total votes | | 24,392 | 100.0 |
| Democratic hold | | | |

=== District 47 ===
Iowa Senate, District 47 general election, 1972
| Party | Candidate | Votes | % |
|---|---|---|---|
| Republican | James B. Turner | 13,177 | 52.3 |
| Democratic | Arlo Hullinger | 12,000 | 47.7 |
| Total votes | | 25,177 | 100.0 |
| Republican hold | | | |

- James Turner died and this necessitated a special election.

Iowa Senate, District 47 special election, 1972
| Party | Candidate | Votes | % |
|---|---|---|---|
| Republican | Richard Ramsey | 4,016 | 50.2 |
| Democratic | Arlo Hullinger | 3,989 | 49.8 |
| Total votes | | 8,005 | 100.0 |
| Republican hold | | | |

=== District 48 ===
Iowa Senate, District 48 general election, 1972
| Party | Candidate | Votes | % |
|---|---|---|---|
| Republican | James E. Briles (incumbent) | 16,905 | 69.5 |
| Democratic | Varel Dodge | 7,404 | 30.5 |
| Total votes | | 24,309 | 100.0 |
| Republican hold | | | |

=== District 49 ===
Iowa Senate, District 49 general election, 1972
| Party | Candidate | Votes | % |
|---|---|---|---|
| Republican | Calvin O. Hultman | 15,797 | 74.1 |
| Democratic | Jennie Lee Bonnichsen | 5,523 | 25.9 |
| Total votes | | 21,320 | 100.0 |
| Republican gain from Democratic | | | |

=== District 50 ===
Iowa Senate, District 50 general election, 1972
| Party | Candidate | Votes | % |
|---|---|---|---|
| Republican | Jim Griffin (incumbent) | 10,171 | 61.2 |
| Democratic | John P. Ryan | 6,453 | 38.8 |
| Total votes | | 16,624 | 100.0 |
| Republican hold | | | |

== See also ==
- United States elections, 1972
- United States House of Representatives elections in Iowa, 1972
- Elections in Iowa
