= 1970 Iowa Senate election =

- November 3, 1970

27 out of 50 seats in the Iowa State Senate 26 seats needed for a majority
	Majority party	Minority party
Leader	Robert R. Rigler	Andrew G. Frommelt
Party	Republican	Democratic
Leader's seat	40th (retired)	30th (lost re-election) (Note: Minority Leader Frommelt was redistricted from district 30 to 25 and lost re-election against another incumbent, Senator John M. Walsh, who had also been redistricted from district 30 to 25.)
Last election	45	16
Seats before	44 (Note: Republican Senator Kenneth Benda resigned and was replaced by Democratic Senator Joann Yessler Orr in district 18 following a special election on June 20, 1969.)	17
Seats after	38	12
Seat change	▼6 (Note: The overall size of the Iowa Senate decreased from 61 to 50 members, so both parties saw a decrease in size following the election of 1970.)	▼5
Majority Leader before election
Robert R. Rigler
Republican
Elected Majority Leader
Clifton C. Lamborn
Republican

The 1970 Iowa State Senate elections took place as part of the biennial 1970 United States elections. Iowa voters elected state senators in 27 of the state senate's 50 districts. Due to redistricting following the amending of the Iowa Constitution in 1968 mandating single-member districts, the Iowa Senate downsized from 61 to 50 members following the 1970 election. State senators typically serve four-year terms in the Iowa State Senate.

The Iowa General Assembly provides statewide maps of each district. To compare the effect of the 1968 redistricting process on the location of each district, contrast the previous map with the map used for 1970 elections.

The primary election on June 2, 1970 determined which candidates appeared on the November 3, 1970 general election ballot. Primary election results can be obtained here. General election results can be obtained here.

Following the previous election, Republicans had control of the Iowa state Senate with 45 seats to Democrats' 16 seats. In June 1969, a special election in district 18 resulted in Sen. Orr flipping a seat in favor of the Democrats. Therefore, on election day in November 1970, Republicans controlled 44 seats and Democrats had 17.

To claim control of the chamber from Republicans, the Democrats needed to net 9 Senate seats.

Republicans maintained control of the Iowa State Senate following the 1970 general election with the balance of power shifting to Republicans holding 38 seats and Democrats having 12 seats (a net loss of 6 seats for Republicans and loss of 5 seats for the Democrats).

== Summary of Results ==
- The Iowa Constitution was amended in 1968 and required transitioning to single-member districts. Following the 1970 elections, the total number of state Senators fell from 61 to 50 members. 27 districts were up for election in 1970.
- An asterisk (*) after a Senator's name indicates they were an incumbent in a new district number due to redistricting.
- Italicized district numbers indicate holdover Senators who were not up for election in 1970, but were shifted to new district numbers in the middle of their terms. These districts did not hold elections in 1970. (Note: Except Sen. Arbuckle, who stayed in the same district number, the 28th, both before and after the redistricting process and was not up for election.)

State Senate District	Incumbent	Party	Elected Senator	Party
1st	Wilson Lloyd Davis	Rep	Lucas DeKoster* (Note: Redistricted from district 49 to 1.)	Rep
2nd	Charles George Mogged	Rep	Marvin Wesley Smith* (Note: Redistricted from district 48 to 2.)	Rep
3rd	Donald Sherman McGill	Dem	Wayne D. Keith* (Note: Redistricted from district 44 to 3.)	Rep
4th	Quentin V. Anderson	Rep	Herbert Luther "H.L." Ollenburg* (Note: Redistricted from district 43 to 4.)	Rep
5th	James E. Briles	Rep	Vernon Kyhl* (Note: Redistricted from district 41 to 5.)	Rep
6th	Earl G. Bass	Rep	George L. Shawver	Rep
7th	Robert R. Dodds	Dem	Floyd Gilley* (Note: Redistricted from district 39 to 7.)	Rep
8th	Richard Lytle Stephens	Rep	S. J. Brownlee* (Note: Redistricted from district 45 to 8.)	Rep
9th	Gene W. Glenn	Dem	Leigh Raymond Curran* (Note: Redistricted from district 42 to 9.)	Rep
10th	Bass Van Gilst	Dem	Ralph Wilson Potter* (Note: Redistricted from district 24 to 10.)	Rep
11th	Charles O. Laverty	Rep	Charles K. Sullivan* (Note: Redistricted from district 37 to 11.)	Rep
12th	Glen E. Bortell	Rep	Alden J. Erskine* (Note: Redistricted from district 37 to 12.)	Rep
13th	Thomas J. Frey	Rep	John Wesley Graham	Rep
13th	James W. Griffin	Rep	John Wesley Graham	Rep
14th	W. R. Rabedeaux	Rep	Arthur A. Neu* (Note: Redistricted from district 29 to 14.)	Rep
15th	Edward E. Nicholson	Rep	C. Joseph Coleman* (Note: Redistricted from district 35 to 15.)	Dem
15th	Harold A. Thordsen	Rep	C. Joseph Coleman*	Dem
16th	Roger John Shaff	Rep	James A. Potgeter* (Note: Redistricted from district 33 to 16.)	Rep
17th	Minnette Doderer	Dem	Rudy Van Drie	Rep
18th	Joann Yessler Orr	Dem	John L. Mowry* (Note: Redistricted from district 26 to 18.)	Rep
19th	Eugene Marshall Hill	Dem	Francis L. Messerly* (Note: Redistricted from district 32 to 19.)	Rep
20th	William F. Denman	Dem	W. Charlene Conklin* (Note: Redistricted from district 32 to 20.)	Rep
20th	Lee H. Gaudineer	Dem	W. Charlene Conklin*	Rep
20th	George E. O'Malley	Dem	W. Charlene Conklin*	Rep
20th	William D. Palmer	Dem	W. Charlene Conklin*	Rep
20th	William J. "Bill" Reichardt	Dem	W. Charlene Conklin*	Rep
21st	Edwin Alan Shirley	Dem	Charles F. Balloun* (Note: Redistricted from district 25 to 21.)	Rep
22nd	James F. Schaben	Dem	Cloyd E. Robinson (Note: Democratic Senator Jesse Donald Weimer was redistricted from district 24 to 22 and Weimer won the 22nd district general election in November 1970. However, he did not take office. In a special election in December, Democrat Cloyd E. Robinson won and kept the seat for the Democratic Party.)	Dem
23rd	Clifton C. Lamborn	Rep	Tom Riley	Rep
24th	Ernest Kosek	Rep	Clifton C. Lamborn* (Note: Redistricted from district 23 to 24. Also note, district 24 transitioned from a 3-member district (2 Republicans & 1 Democrat) to single-member district (1 Republican).)	Rep
24th	Ralph Wilson Potter	Rep	Clifton C. Lamborn*	Rep
24th	Jesse Donald Weimer	Dem	Clifton C. Lamborn*	Rep
25th	Charles F. Balloun	Rep	John M. Walsh* (Note: Redistricted from district 30 to 25.)	Rep
26th	John L. Mowry	Rep	Gene V. Kennedy	Dem
27th	Pearle P. DeHart	Rep	James F. Schaben* (Note: Redistricted from district 22 to 27.)	Dem
28th	R. Dean Arbuckle	Rep	R. Dean Arbuckle	Rep
29th	Arthur A. Neu	Rep	Reinhold O. Carlson	Rep
30th	Andrew G. Frommelt	Dem	William D. Palmer* (Note: Redistricted from district 20 to 30. Also note, district 30 transitioned from a 2-member district (1 Republican & 1 Democrat) to single-member district (1 Democrat).)	Dem
30th	John M. Walsh	Rep	William D. Palmer*	Dem
31st	Kenneth Lawrence Parker	Rep	George F. Milligan	Rep
32nd	W. Charlene Conklin	Rep	Lee H. Gaudineer* (Note: Redistricted from district 20 to 32. Also note, district 32 transitioned from a 3-member district (3 Republicans) to single-member district (1 Democrat).)	Dem
32nd	Chester O. Hougen	Rep	Lee H. Gaudineer*	Dem
32nd	Francis L. Messerly	Rep	Lee H. Gaudineer*	Dem
33rd	James A. Potgeter	Rep	John E. Tapscott	Dem
34th	Hugh H. Clarke	Rep	Eugene Marshall Hill* (Note: Redistricted from district 19 to 34.)	Dem
35th	C. Joseph Coleman	Dem	Minnette Doderer* (Note: Redistricted from district 17 to 35.)	Dem
36th	Elmer F. Lange	Rep	W. R. Rabedeaux* (Note: Redistricted from district 14 to 36.)	Rep
37th	Alden J. Erskine	Rep	Roger John Shaff* (Note: Redistricted from district 16 to 37. Also note, district 37 transitioned from a 2-member district (2 Republicans) to single-member district (1 Republican).)	Rep
37th	Charles K. Sullivan	Rep	Roger John Shaff*	Rep
38th	Leslie C. Klink	Rep	Edward E. Nicholson* (Note: Redistricted from district 15 to 38.)	Rep
39th	Floyd Gilley	Rep	Harold A. Thordsen* (Note: Redistricted from district 15 to 39.)	Rep
40th	Robert R. Rigler	Rep	James W. Griffin* (Note: Redistricted from district 13 to 40.)	Rep
41st	Vernon Kyhl	Rep	Earl G. Bass* (Note: Redistricted from district 6 to 41.)	Rep
42nd	Leigh Raymond Curran	Rep	James E. Briles* (Note: Redistricted from district 5 to 42.)	Rep
43rd	Herbert Luther "H.L." Ollenburg	Rep	John C. Rhodes	Rep
44th	Wayne D. Keith	Rep	Bass Van Gilst* (Note: Redistricted from district 10 to 44.)	Dem
45th	S. J. Brownlee	Rep	Richard Lytle Stephens* (Note: Redistricted from district 8 to 45.)	Rep
46th	J. Leslie Leonard	Rep	Charles Peter Miller	Dem
47th	J. Henry Lucken	Rep	Charles O. Laverty* (Note: Redistricted from district 11 to 47.)	Rep
48th	Marvin Wesley Smith	Rep	Quentin V. Anderson* (Note: Redistricted from district 4 to 48.)	Rep
49th	Lucas DeKoster	Rep	Gene W. Glenn* (Note: Redistricted from district 9 to 49.)	Dem
50th	Newly created district		Wilson Lloyd Davis* (Note: Redistricted from district 1 to 50.)	Rep

== Detailed Results ==
- Reminder: A change to the Iowa Constitution required transitioning to all single-member districts from 1970 onward.
- Note: If a district does not list a primary, then that district did not have a competitive primary (i.e., there may have only been one candidate file for that district).

=== District 6 ===
Iowa Senate, District 6 Republican Primary Election, 1970
Party	Candidate	Votes	%
Republican	George L. Shawver	1,243	48.1
Republican	Emil Roloff	1,037	40.1
Republican	Ray Fairholm	305	11.8
Total votes		2,585	100.0

Iowa Senate, District 6 General Election, 1970
Party	Candidate	Votes	%
Republican	George L. Shawver	8,619	53.1
Democratic	Herbert J. Max	7,605	46.9
Total votes		16,224	100.0
Republican hold			

=== District 12 ===
Iowa Senate, District 12 General Election, 1970
Party	Candidate	Votes	%
Republican	Alden J. Erskine (incumbent)	6,778	52.8
Democratic	Albert H. Gray	5,742	44.7
American Independent	Lee E. Smith	319	2.5
Total votes		12,839	100.0
Republican hold			

=== District 13 ===
Iowa Senate, District 13 Republican Primary Election, 1970
Party	Candidate	Votes	%
Republican	J. Wesley Graham	2,780	52.4
Republican	Elmer F. Lange (incumbent) (Note: Redistricted from district 36 to 13.)	2,526	47.6
Total votes		5,306	100.0

Iowa Senate, District 13 General Election, 1970
Party	Candidate	Votes	%
Republican	J. Wesley Graham	8,253	59.6
Democratic	J. Ralph Rauch	5,605	40.4
Total votes		13,859	100.0
Republican hold			

=== District 14 ===
Iowa Senate, District 14 Republican Primary Election, 1970
Party	Candidate	Votes	%
Republican	Arthur A. Neu (incumbent)	1,865	59.1
Republican	Frank A. Crabb	1,292	40.9
Total votes		3,157	100.0

Iowa Senate, District 14 General Election, 1970
Party	Candidate	Votes	%
Republican	Arthur A. Neu (incumbent)	8,563	62.5
Democratic	Mary Baumhover	5,145	37.5
Total votes		13,708	100.0
Republican hold			

=== District 16 ===
Iowa Senate, District 16 General Election, 1970
Party	Candidate	Votes	%
Republican	James A. Potgeter (incumbent)	8,135	59.7
Democratic	Rocco LaValle	5,496	40.3
Total votes		13,631	100.0
Republican hold			

=== District 17 ===
Iowa Senate, District 17 General Election, 1970
Party	Candidate	Votes	%
Republican	Rudy Van Drie	8,572	52.7
Democratic	Barbara A. Koerber	7,691	47.3
Total votes		16,263	100.0
Republican gain from Democratic			

=== District 19 ===
Iowa Senate, District 19 General Election, 1970
Party	Candidate	Votes	%
Republican	Francis Messerly (incumbent)	9,425	53.8
Democratic	Marvin E. Haugebak	8,093	46.2
Total votes		17,518	100.0
Republican gain from Democratic			

=== District 21 ===
Iowa Senate, District 21 General Election, 1970
Party	Candidate	Votes	%
Republican	Charles F. Balloun (incumbent)	8,053	52.4
Democratic	Ernest Groth	7,314	47.6
Total votes		15,367	100.0
Republican gain from Democratic			

=== District 22 ===
Iowa Senate, District 22 General Election, 1970
Party	Candidate	Votes	%
Democratic	J. Donald Weimer (incumbent) (Note: Redistricted from district 24 to 22.)	10,798	64.1
Republican	Delmer Duffy	6,042	35.9
Total votes		16,840	100.0
Democratic hold			

- Sen. Weimer did not take his seat in district 22 after winning re-election.

Iowa Senate, District 22 Special Election, 1970
Party	Candidate	Votes	%
Democratic	Cloyd E. Robinson	2,782	55.8
Republican	Jesse G. Hunter	2,201	44.2
Total votes		4,983	100.0
Democratic hold			

=== District 23 ===
Iowa Senate, District 23 Republican Primary Election, 1970
Party	Candidate	Votes	%
Republican	Tom Riley	2,492	66.3
Republican	Ernest Kosek (incumbent) (Note: Redistricted from district 24 to 23.)	1,268	33.7
Total votes		3,760	100.0

Iowa Senate, District 23 General Election, 1970
Party	Candidate	Votes	%
Republican	Tom Riley	11,461	61.2
Democratic	John M. Ely, Jr.	7,257	38.8
Total votes		18,718	100.0
Republican hold			

=== District 24 ===
Iowa Senate, District 24 General Election, 1970
Party	Candidate	Votes	%
Republican	Clifton C. Lamborn (incumbent)	9,260	58.1
Democratic	John A. Holmes	6,675	41.9
Total votes		15,935	100.0
Republican hold			

=== District 25 ===
Iowa Senate, District 25 General Election, 1970
Party	Candidate	Votes	%
Republican	John M. Walsh (incumbent)	10,874	58.0
Democratic	Andrew G. Frommelt (incumbent)	7,865	42.0
Total votes		18,739	100.0
Republican hold			

=== District 26 ===
Iowa Senate, District 26 Democratic Primary Election, 1970
Party	Candidate	Votes	%
Democratic	Adolph W. Elvers	1,529	58.7
Democratic	Gene V. Kennedy	1,074	41.3
Total votes		2,603	100.0

Iowa Senate, District 26 General Election, 1970
Party	Candidate	Votes	%
Democratic	Gene V. Kennedy	9,192	56.6
Republican	Leslie C. Klink (incumbent) (Note: Redistricted from district 38 to 26.)	7,048	43.4
Total votes		16,240	100.0
Democratic gain from Republican			

=== District 27 ===
Iowa Senate, District 27 Republican Primary Election, 1970
Party	Candidate	Votes	%
Republican	William E. Darrington	1,902	48.2
Republican	Thomas J. Frey (incumbent) (Note: Redistricted from district 13 to 27.)	1,309	33.1
Republican	Ernest L. Currie	740	18.7
Total votes		3,951	100.0

Iowa Senate, District 27 General Election, 1970
Party	Candidate	Votes	%
Democratic	James F. Schaben (incumbent)	9,445	59.1
Republican	William E. Darrington	6,543	40.9
Total votes		15,988	100.0
Democratic gain from Republican			

=== District 29 ===
Iowa Senate, District 29 Republican Primary Election, 1970
Party	Candidate	Votes	%
Republican	Reinhold O. Carlson	1,483	66.5
Republican	Henry R. Simpson	746	33.5
Total votes		2,229	100.0

Iowa Senate, District 29 Democratic Primary Election, 1970
Party	Candidate	Votes	%
Democratic	Dan L. Johnston	1,576	45.4
Democratic	Charles H. Day	1,204	34.7
Democratic	Ralph P. Mascaro	690	19.9
Total votes		3,470	100.0

Iowa Senate, District 29 General Election, 1970
Party	Candidate	Votes	%
Republican	Reinhold O. Carlson	9,646	49.9
Democratic	Dan L. Johnston	9,317	48.2
American Independent	James W. Parker	375	1.9
Total votes		19,338	100.0
Republican hold			

=== District 31 ===
Iowa Senate, District 31 General Election, 1970
Party	Candidate	Votes	%
Republican	George F. Milligan	11,486	61.6
Democratic	Howard C. Reppert, Jr.	7,164	38.4
Total votes		18,650	100.0
Republican hold			

=== District 33 ===
Iowa Senate, District 33 Democratic Primary Election, 1970
Party	Candidate	Votes	%
Democratic	John Tapscott	2,239	55.3
Democratic	Jack E. Woods	1,808	44.7
Total votes		4,047	100.0

Iowa Senate, District 33 General Election, 1970
Party	Candidate	Votes	%
Democratic	John Tapscott	7,591	67.4
Republican	Joseph B. Joyce	3,664	32.6
Total votes		11,255	100.0
Democratic gain from Republican			

=== District 34 ===
Iowa Senate, District 34 Republican Primary Election, 1970
Party	Candidate	Votes	%
Republican	Martin O. O'Connor	1,732	66.5
Republican	Charles V. Dunham	874	33.5
Total votes		2,606	100.0

Iowa Senate, District 34 General Election, 1970
Party	Candidate	Votes	%
Democratic	Eugene M. Hill (incumbent)	8,509	52.7
Republican	Martin O. O'Connor	7,640	47.3
Total votes		16,149	100.0
Democratic gain from Republican			

=== District 36 ===
Iowa Senate, District 36 Republican Primary Election, 1970
Party	Candidate	Votes	%
Republican	W. R. Rabedeaux (incumbent)	4,137	62.1
Republican	William B. Norton	2,530	37.9
Total votes		6,667	100.0

Iowa Senate, District 36 General Election, 1970
Party	Candidate	Votes	%
Republican	W. R. Rabedeaux (incumbent)	7,146	55.9
Democratic	W. Minard Thomas	5,644	44.1
Total votes		12,790	100.0
Republican hold			

=== District 37 ===
Iowa Senate, District 37 General Election, 1970
Party	Candidate	Votes	%
Republican	Roger J. Shaff (incumbent)	7,993	53.6
Democratic	Robert W. Burke	6,933	46.4
Total votes		14,926	100.0
Republican hold			

=== District 38 ===
Iowa Senate, District 38 General Election, 1970
Party	Candidate	Votes	%
Republican	Edward E. Nicholson (incumbent)	11,424	100.0
Total votes		11,424	100.0
Republican hold			

=== District 41 ===
Iowa Senate, District 41 Republican Primary Election, 1970
Party	Candidate	Votes	%
Republican	Earl Bass (incumbent)	2,409	42.1
Republican	Leroy S. Miller	1,908	33.4
Republican	Conrad Ossian	1,403	24.5
Total votes		5,720	100.0

Iowa Senate, District 41 General Election, 1970
Party	Candidate	Votes	%
Republican	Earl Bass (incumbent)	9,123	69.7
Democratic	Jacky Adams	3,973	30.3
Total votes		13,096	100.0
Republican hold			

=== District 43 ===
Iowa Senate, District 43 Republican Primary Election, 1970
Party	Candidate	Votes	%
Republican	John C. Rhodes	1,915	54.3
Republican	Glen E. Bortell (incumbent) (Note: Redistricted from district 12 to 43.)	1,614	45.7
Total votes		3,529	100.0

Iowa Senate, District 43 General Election, 1970
Party	Candidate	Votes	%
Republican	John C. Rhodes	8,710	51.4
Democratic	Alan Shirley (incumbent) (Note: Redistricted from district 21 to 43.)	8,112	47.8
American Independent	William R. Kuhns	138	0.8
Total votes		16,960	100.0
Republican hold			

=== District 45 ===
Iowa Senate, District 45 Republican Primary Election, 1970
Party	Candidate	Votes	%
Republican	Richard L. Stephens (incumbent)	3,597	50.8
Republican	Charles G. Mogged (incumbent) (Note: Redistricted from district 2 to 45.)	3,488	49.2
Total votes		7,085	100.0

Iowa Senate, District 45 General Election, 1970
Party	Candidate	Votes	%
Republican	Richard L. Stephens (incumbent)	7,923	56.5
Democratic	William Stammerman	5,918	42.2
American Independent	Ernest Beachy	189	1.3
Total votes		14,030	100.0
Republican hold			

=== District 46 ===
Iowa Senate, District 46 General Election, 1970
Party	Candidate	Votes	%
Democratic	Charles P. Miller	8,769	53.3
Republican	Milton C. Titus	7,683	46.7
Total votes		16,452	100.0
Democratic gain from Republican			

=== District 49 ===
Iowa Senate, District 49 General Election, 1970
Party	Candidate	Votes	%
Democratic	Gene W. Glenn (incumbent)	8,779	55.7
Republican	Russell W. Harper	6,792	43.1
American Independent	Phil Darner	192	1.2
Total votes		15,763	100.0
Democratic gain from Republican			

=== District 50 ===
Iowa Senate, District 50 General Election, 1970
Party	Candidate	Votes	%
Republican	Wilson L. Davis (incumbent)	8,469	52.4
Democratic	Adrian Brinck	7,703	47.6
Total votes		16,172	100.0

== See also ==
- United States elections, 1970
- United States House of Representatives elections in Iowa, 1970
- Elections in Iowa
