= Clark R. Rasmussen =

American politician (1934–2024)

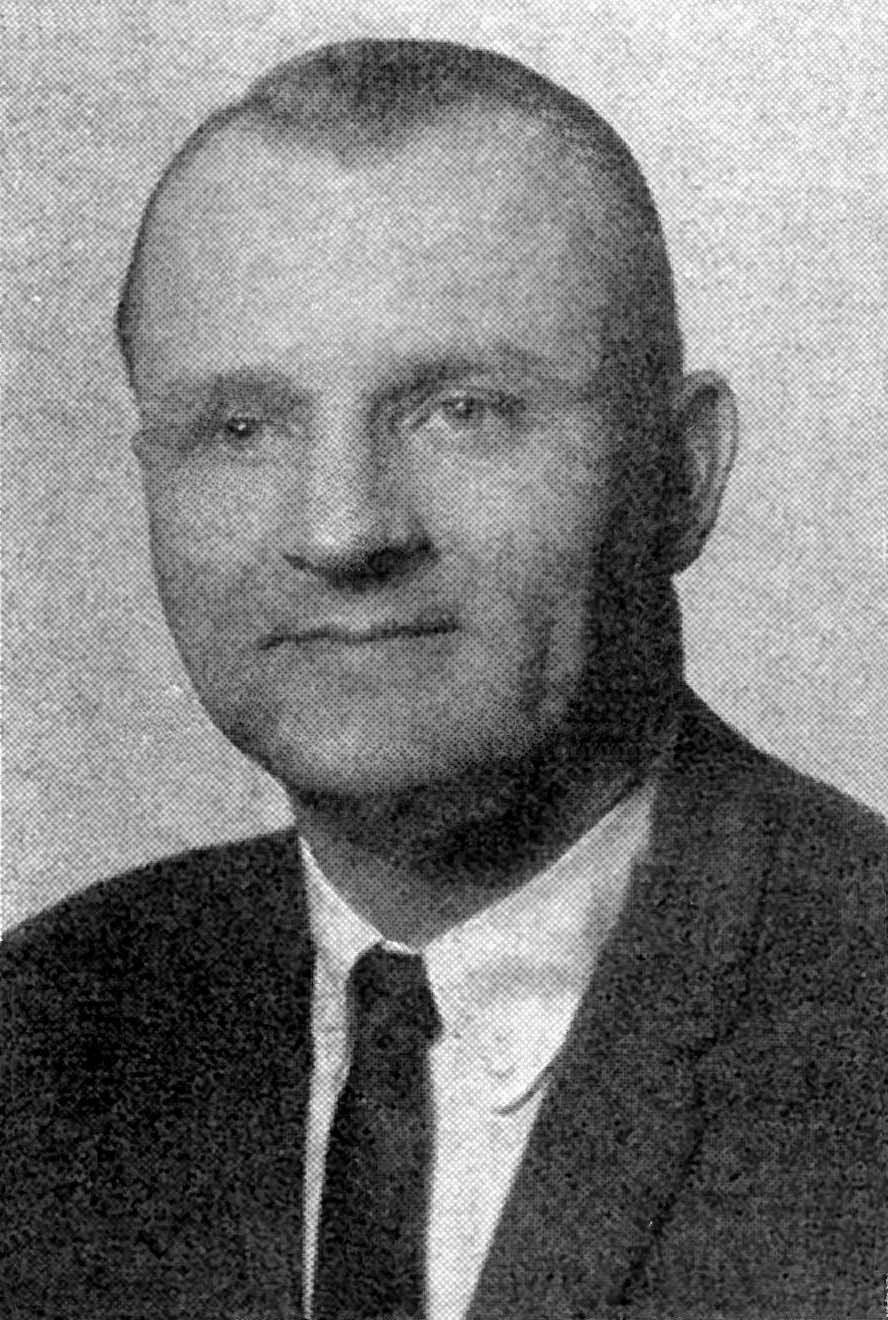
- Rasmussen in 1965

Member of the Iowa House of Representatives from the 37th district
- In office January 11, 1965 – January 8, 1967 Serving with 10 others (Note: Mattie Bogenrief, James T. Caffrey, James Peter Denato, Lee H. Gaudineer, Willie Stevenson Glanton, Walter F. Maley, Bernard J. O'Malley, William D. Palmer, William J. Reichardt, and Thomas A. Renda)
- Preceded by: William F. Denman & Howard Reppert
- Succeeded by: Many (Note: Rasmussen was succeeded by 11 different representatives: Harry W. Beardsley, Vernon N. Bennett, James T. Caffrey, June Franklin, Charles F. Glenn, Dan Johnston, James Edward Maloney, Bernard J. O'Malley, William D. Palmer, Thomas A. Renda, and John E. Tapscott)

Personal details
- Born: July 11, 1934 Kimballton, Iowa, U.S.
- Died: October 9, 2024 (aged 90) Des Moines, Iowa, U.S.
- Party: Democratic
- Spouse: Joanne Disterhoft
- Children: 5
- Education: Grand View University; Drake University (BS)
- Occupation: Claims supervisor, small business owner

Clark Ray Rasmussen (July 11, 1934 – October 9, 2024) was an American politician who represented Polk County in the Iowa House of Representatives from 1965 to 1967 as a member of the Democratic Party.

== Early life ==
Rasmussen was born in Kimballton, Iowa, on July 11, 1934. He had four sisters, one of whom was his fraternal twin. He graduated from Elk Horn High School in 1952 and enrolled at Grand View University. He served in the 1st Cavalry Division in Japan from 1954 to 1956. He resumed his studies at Grand View upon returning and then attended Drake University, from which he graduated with a Bachelor of Science in 1958.

== Career ==
Rasmussen worked as a claims supervisor for the Travelers Insurance Company after graduating from Drake. In 1964, he was elected to represent Polk County in the Iowa House of Representatives, where he served one term. He was one of 11 people who represented Polk County during the 61st General Assembly under the short-lived redistricting act enabled by the Democratic legislature that allowed for the state's most populous counties to elect multiple representatives. He then served as chairman of the Iowa Democratic Party until 1971, when he became an aide to senator Harold Hughes. In 1974, he ran for governor of Iowa, but lost in the Democratic primaries, winning 16% of the vote.

After his defeat, he opened Rasmussen and Sons Bicycle Shop in West Des Moines. He served as secretary of the Iowa Senate in 1975. He later served as clerk of the Polk County district court for 11 years before being elected to the Polk County Board of Supervisors in 1986, where he served one term.

== Personal life and death ==
Rasmussen married Joanne Disterhoft in 1956 and had five children. He died in Des Moines, Iowa, on October 9, 2024, at the age of 90.

Rasmussen was a member of Delta Sigma Pi.
