= Iowa's 39th House of Representatives district =

American legislative district

House District 39
- Type: District of the Lower house
- Location: Iowa
- Representative: Rick Olson
- Parent organization: Iowa General Assembly

The 39th District of the Iowa House of Representatives in the state of Iowa is part of Polk County.

== Current elected officials ==
Rick Olson is the representative currently representing the district.

== Past representatives ==
The district has previously been represented by:

- Vernon A. Ewell, 1971–1973
- Glenn F. Brockett, 1973–1979
- Michael R. Lura, 1979–1981
- Thomas E. Swartz, 1981–1983
- Hugo A. Schnekloth, 1983–1991
- Robert L. Rafferty, 1991–1993
- Dan J. Boddicker, 1993–2003
- Dell Hanson, 2003–2005
- Dawn Pettengill, 2005–2013
- Jake Highfill, 2013–2019
- Karin Derry, 2019–2021
- Eddie Andrews, 2021–2023
- Rick L. Olson, 2023–2027
