= Iowa's 78th House of Representatives district =

American legislative district

House District 78
- Type: District of the Lower house
- Location: Iowa
- Representative: Angel Ramirez
- Parent organization: Iowa General Assembly

The 78th District of the Iowa House of Representatives in the state of Iowa is part of Linn County.

== Current elected officials ==
This district is currently represented by Angel Ramirez.

== Past representatives ==
The district has previously been represented by:

- Dennis L. Freeman, 1969–1971
- Elizabeth Orr Shaw, 1971–1973
- Brice Oakley, 1973–1977
- Hugo Schnekloth, 1977–1983
- Dennis Renaud, 1983–1993
- Dwight Dinkla, 1993–1999
- Clel Baudler, 1999–2003
- Vicki Lensing, 2003–2013
- Jarad Klein, 2013–2023
- Sami Scheetz, 2023–2025
- Angel Ramirez, 2025–Present
