= Hullinger =

Hullinger is a surname. Notable people with the surname include:

- Arlo Hullinger (1921–2021), American politician
- Jeff Hullinger, American sports anchor
