= Quentin V. Anderson =

American politician (1932–2019)

Member of the Iowa State Senate
- In office 1969–1973

Member of the Iowa House of Representatives
- In office 1963–1967; 1973–1975

Personal details
- Born: May 7, 1932 Ringgold County, Iowa, U.S.
- Died: December 27, 2019 (aged 87) Sun Valley Lake, Iowa, U.S.
- Party: Republican
- Occupation: Farmer

Quentin V. Anderson (May 7, 1932 – December 27, 2019) was an American politician in the state of Iowa.

Anderson was born in Ringgold County, Iowa. He attended the American Institute of Business and is a farmer. He served in the Iowa State Senate from 1969 to 1973, and House of Representatives from 1963 to 1967 and 1973 to 1975, as a Republican. He died on December 27, 2019.

Iowa House of Representatives
Preceded by Lester Sickels	7th district 1963–1967	Succeeded by Elbert Watson
Iowa Senate
Preceded by Franklin Main	4th district 1969–1971	Succeeded by Herbert Ollenburg
Preceded by Marvin W. Smith	48th district 1971–1973	Succeeded by James E. Briles
Iowa House of Representatives
Preceded by Thomas M. Dougherty	94th district 1973–1975	Succeeded by Arlo Hullinger
