= Alesch (surname) =

Alesch is a surname, and may refer to:

- Jill Alesch, American politician
- Robert Alesch, French-Luxembourgish priest, collaborator with Nazi Germany
