= Elizabeth Orr Shaw =

American lawyer and politician

Member of the Iowa Senate from the 40th district
- In office January 8, 1973 – October 1, 1977
- Preceded by: James W. Griffin
- Succeeded by: Edgar Holden

Member of the Iowa House of Representatives from the 78th district
- In office January 11, 1971 – January 7, 1973
- Preceded by: Dennis L. Freeman
- Succeeded by: Brice Oakley

Member of the Iowa House of Representatives from the 43rd district
- In office January 9, 1967 – January 10, 1971
- Preceded by: Foster F. Felger
- Succeeded by: Richard M. Radl

Personal details
- Born: October 2, 1923 Monona, Iowa
- Died: July 23, 2014 (aged 90) Columbia, Maryland
- Party: Republican

Elizabeth Orr Shaw (October 2, 1923 – July 23, 2014) was an American lawyer and politician. A Republican, she served in the Iowa House of Representatives for the 43rd district from 1967 to 1971 and for the 78th district from 1971 to 1973. She was a member of the Iowa Senate for the 40th district from 1973 to 1977.

== Early life ==
Shaw was born on October 2, 1923, in Monona, Iowa. Her parents were Harold T. and Hazel Kean Orr. She received a bachelor of arts degree from Drake University in 1945, where she was a member of Phi Beta Kappa. She also earned a masters of arts degree in public administration from the University of Minnesota in 1946. She attended the University of Iowa Law School, where she was a member of the Order of the Coif, graduating with her J.D. in 1948. She practiced law in Davenport, Iowa, and was a member of the Scott County Crime Commission. In 1946, she married Donald H. Shaw and the couple had three children: Elizabeth Ann, Andrew Hardy and Anthony Orr.

== Political career ==
Shaw was first elected to the Iowa House of Representatives for the 43rd district in 1966, serving as a representative for the Republican Party between January 9, 1967, and January 10, 1971. She was a representative for the 78th district from January 11, 1971, to January 7, 1973. Shaw was a representative for the 40th district in the Iowa Senate from January 8, 1973, to October 1, 1977. She was assistant minority leader during her final term in the Senate.

== Later life ==
Shaw died in Columbia, Maryland, on July 23, 2014.
