= Tom Dougherty =

Tom or Thomas Dougherty may refer to:

- Tom Dougherty (baseball) (1881–1953), American baseball pitcher
- Tom Dougherty (union official) (1902–1972), Australian trade union official and politician
- J. Thomas Dougherty (born 1951), American diplomat
- Thomas M. Dougherty (1910–1996), American politician

== See also ==
- Thomas Daugherty, member of The Elms (band)
- Tom Daugherty (born 1975), American ten-pin bowler
- Tom Docherty (1924–2020), English footballer
- Tommy Docherty (1928–2020), Scottish football player and manager
