= Vernon N. Bennett =

American politician (1936–2008)

Member of the Iowa House of Representatives from the 37th district
- In office 1967–1971 Serving with June Franklin (1967–1971), Thomas A. Renda, John E. Tapscott, Don Alt (all 1969–1971)
- Preceded by: Willie Stevenson Glanton

Member of the Iowa House of Representatives from the 59th district
- In office 1971–1973
- Succeeded by: David Readinger

Personal details
- Born: August 18, 1936 Winterset, Iowa, U.S.
- Died: November 30, 2008 (aged 72) Des Moines, Iowa, U.S.
- Party: Democratic
- Occupation: union representative

Vernon Nile Bennett (August 18, 1936 – November 30, 2008) was an American politician in the state of Iowa.

Bennett was born in Winterset, Iowa. He was a union representative. He served in the Iowa House of Representatives from 1967 to 1973 as a Democrat. He died on November 30, 2008, aged 72.
