= Senator Milligan =

Senator Milligan may refer to:

- Barry Milligan (fl. 2020s), Louisiana State Senate
- George Milligan (politician) (1934–1990), Iowa State Senate
