= Dennis Freeman =

Dennis Freeman may refer to:

- Dennis L. Freeman (1939–2020), American politician
- Denny Freeman (1944–2021), American musician
