= Brice Oakley =

American politician (born 1937)

Member of the Iowa House of Representatives from the 78th district
- In office January 8, 1973 – January 9, 1977
- Preceded by: Elizabeth Orr Shaw
- Succeeded by: Hugo Schnekloth

Personal details
- Born: February 4, 1937 (age 89) Washington, Iowa, U.S.
- Party: Republican

Brice Oakley (born February 4, 1937) is an American politician who served in the Iowa House of Representatives from the 78th district from 1973 to 1977.
