= Iowa's 37th Senate district =

American legislative district

Senate District 37
- Type: District of the Upper House
- Location: Eastern Iowa
- Senator: Molly Donahue (D)
- Parent organization: Iowa General Assembly

The 37th District of the Iowa Senate is located in eastern Iowa, and is currently composed of part of Linn County.

== Current elected officials ==
Molly Donahue is the senator currently representing the 37th District.

The area of the 37th District contains two Iowa House of Representatives districts:

- The 73rd District (represented by Elizabeth Wilson)
- The 74th District (represented by Eric Gjerde)

The district is also located in Iowa's 2nd congressional district, which is represented by Ashley Hinson.

== Past senators ==
The district has previously been represented by:

- David C. Hastings, 1860–1864
- Benjamin T. Hunt, 1864–1868
- Homer E. Newell, 1868–1870
- William G. Donnan, 1870–1871
- George Washington Bemis, 1872–1876
- Merrit W. Harmon, 1876–1878
- Daniel Darrow Chase, 1878–1882
- John L. Kamrar, 1882–1886
- Nicholas F. Weber, 1886–1890
- William Callum Smith, 1890–1894
- John English Rowen, 1894–1898
- Joseph Wallace, 1898–1902
- Fred Carlton Hartshorn, 1902–1907
- Charles Fremont Peterson, 1907–1911
- Daniel Cady Chase, 1911–1919, 1923
- Eugene Schaffter, 1919–1921
- William Schmedika, 1923–1927
- Oscar Ulstad, 1927–1931
- Irving H. Knudson, 1931–1935
- George Raymond Hill, 1936–1947
- Rex R. Bateson, 1947–1955
- John A. Walker, 1955–1963
- Donald G. Beneke, 1963–1967
- Alden J. Erskine, 1967–1973
- Charles S. Van Eaton, 1967–1969
- Charles K. Sullivan, 1969–1971
- Roger John Shaff, 1971–1973
- Minnette Fredrichs Doderer, 1973–1979
- Arthur A. Small, 1979–1987
- Charles Hughes Bruner, 1983–1991
- Ralph Rosenberg, 1991–1993
- Mary Kramer, 1993–2003
- Douglas Shull, 2003–2007
- Staci Appel, 2007–2011
- Kent Sorenson, 2011–2013
- Robert Dvorsky, 2013–2019
- Zach Wahls, 2019–2023
- Molly Donahue, 2023–Present

== Recent election results from statewide races ==
Year	Office	Results
2008	President	Obama 56–43%
2012	President	Obama 55–45%
2016	President	Clinton 49–43%
2016	Senate	Grassley 57–39%
2018	Governor	Hubbell 54–43%
2018	Attorney General	Miller 77–23%
2018	Secretary of State	Pate 48.7–48.3%
2018	Treasurer	Fitzgerald 60–37%
2018	Auditor	Sand 57–40%
2020	President	Biden 55–42%
2020	Senate	Greenfield 54–43%
2022	Senate	Franken 55–45%
2022	Governor	DeJear 51–46%
2022	Attorney General	Miller 60–40%
2022	Secretary of State	Miller 52–48%
2022	Treasurer	Fitzgerald 59–41%
2022	Auditor	Sand 61–39%
2024	President	Harris 55–43%

== See also ==
- Iowa General Assembly
- Iowa Senate
