= 1974 Iowa gubernatorial election =

- November 5, 1974
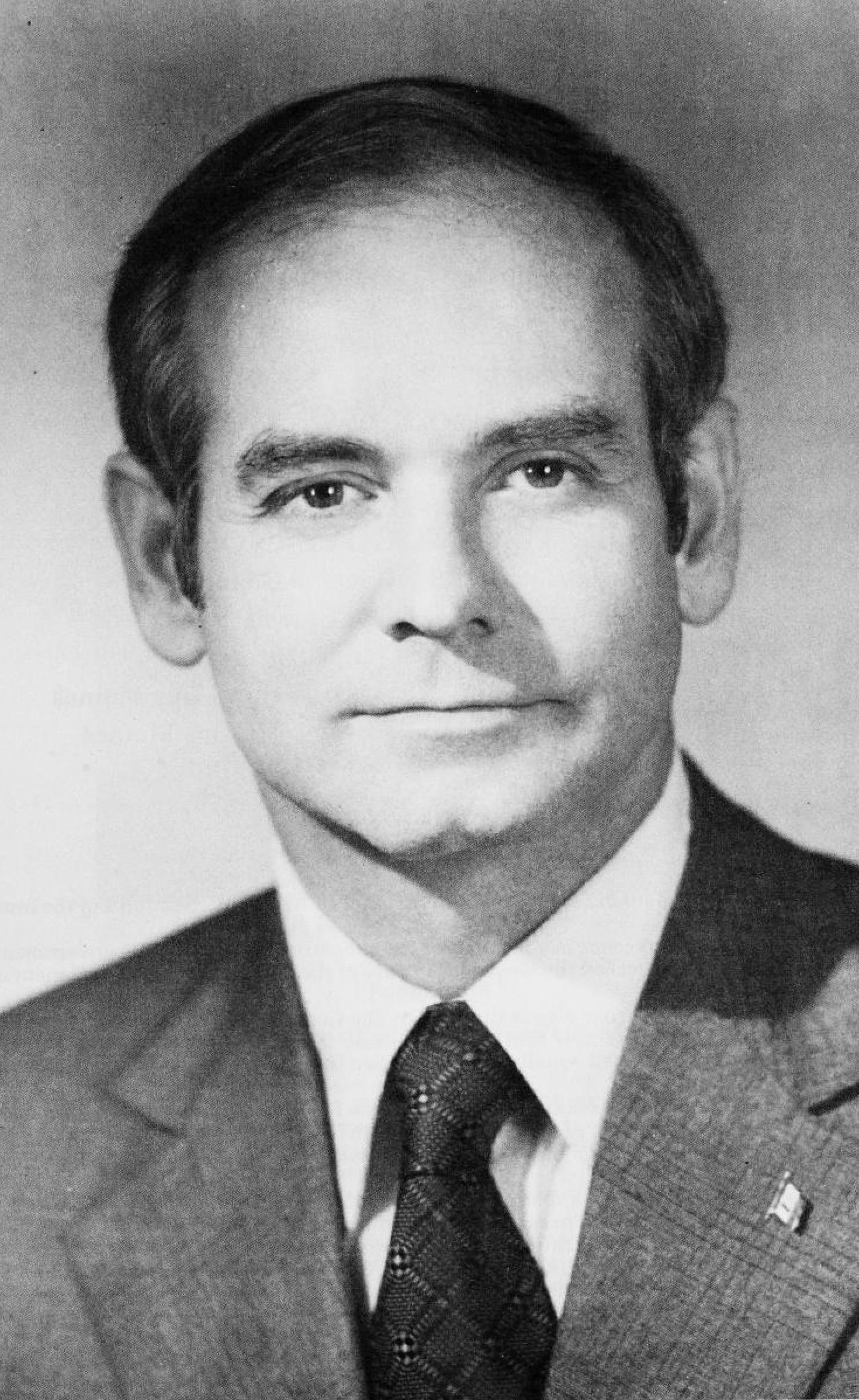

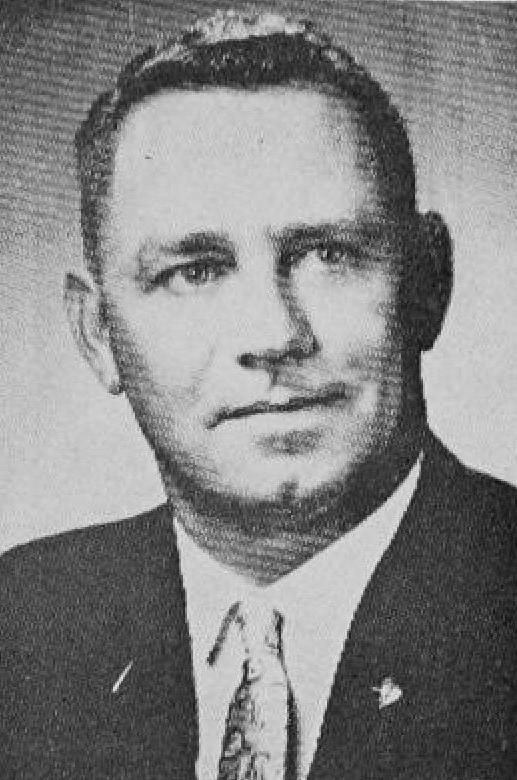
Nominee	Robert D. Ray	James Schaben
Party	Republican	Democratic
Popular vote	534,518	377,553
Percentage	58.07%	41.02%
- County results Ray: 50–60% 60–70% 70–80% Schaben: 50–60%
Governor before election
Robert D. Ray
Republican
Elected Governor
Robert D. Ray
Republican

The 1974 Iowa gubernatorial election was held on November 5, 1974. Incumbent Republican Robert D. Ray defeated Democratic nominee James Schaben with 58.07% of the vote.

== Primary elections ==
Primary elections were held on June 4, 1974.

=== Democratic primary ===
==== Candidates ====
- William J. Gannon, former state representative
- James Schaben, state senator
- Clark R. Rasmussen, former state representative

==== Results ====
Democratic primary results
Party	Candidate	Votes	%
Democratic	James Schaben	59,840	44.82
Democratic	William J. Gannon	52,420	39.26
Democratic	Clark R. Rasmussen	21,240	15.91
Democratic	Write-ins	16	0.01
Total votes		133,516	100.00

=== Republican primary ===
==== Candidates ====
- Robert D. Ray, incumbent governor

==== Results ====
Republican primary results
Party	Candidate	Votes	%
Republican	Robert D. Ray (incumbent)	126,113	99.98
Republican	Write-ins	25	0.02
Total votes		126,138	100.00

== General election ==
=== Candidates ===
Major party candidates

- Robert D. Ray, Republican
- James Schaben, Democratic

Other candidates

- Ralph Scott, American

=== Results ===
1974 Iowa gubernatorial election
Party	Candidate	Votes	%	±%
Republican	Robert D. Ray (incumbent)	534,518	58.07%	−0.36%
Democratic	James Schaben	377,553	41.02%	+0.76%
American	Ralph Scott	8,323	0.90%	
Write-ins		64	0.01%	
Majority		156,965	17.05%	
Turnout		920,458		
Republican hold		Swing		
