= Iowa's 17th House of Representatives district =

American legislative district

House District 17
- Type: District of the Lower house
- Location: Iowa
- Representative: Devon Wood
- Parent organization: Iowa General Assembly

The 17th District of the Iowa House of Representatives in the state of Iowa. It is currently composed of Adams, Taylor, and Ringgold Counties, as well as parts of Union and Page Counties.

== Current elected officials ==
Devon Wood is the representative currently representing the district.

== Past representatives ==
The district has previously been represented by:

- Thomas M. Dougherty, 1964–1965
- Murray C. Lawson, 1971–1973
- John C. Mendenhall, 1973–1975
- Roger Halvorson, 1975–1983
- Del Stromer, 1983–1989
- Stewart Iverson, 1989–1995
- Russell Teig, 1995–2003
- Bill Dix, 2003–2007
- Pat Grassley, 2007–2013
- Matt Windschitl, 2013–2023
