= Foster Felger =

American politician (1908–1984)

Member of the Iowa House of Representatives from the 43rd district
- In office January 11, 1965 – January 8, 1967
- Succeeded by: Elizabeth Orr Shaw

Personal details
- Born: Foster Francis Felger; May 10, 1908 Davenport, Iowa, U.S.
- Died: July 1984 (aged 76) Davenport, Iowa, U.S.
- Party: Democratic
- Spouse: Siri Peterson (m. 1932)
- Children: 2
- Education: Central High School
- Occupation: Politician

Foster Francis Felger (May 10, 1908 – July 1984) was an American politician.

Felger was a native of Davenport, Iowa, born on May 10, 1908, to parents Charles and Lura Felger. He graduated from Davenport Central High School in 1926, and married Siri Peterson in 1932. Felger operated a cigar store in the Kahl Building, and later ran two restaurants, an inn, and the first franchised distributor of General Foods in the United States. During World War II, Felger worked as a federal investigator, and in later life became a real estate broker. He served a single term on the Iowa House of Representatives as the Democratic legislator from District 43 between 1965 and 1967. He died on a Saturday in July 1984, at Mercy Hospital of Davenport. His wife died on April 7, 1993.
