= Joe Gross =

American politician (1925–2004)

L. W. (Joe) Gross

Member of the Iowa House of Representatives from the 94th district
- In office January 12, 1981 – January 9, 1983
- Preceded by: Arlo Hullinger
- Succeeded by: William H. Harbor

Personal details
- Born: Lester William ("Joe") Gross; October 27, 1925 Fort Morgan, Colorado, U.S.
- Died: August 2, 2004 (aged 78) Mount Ayr, Iowa, U.S.
- Party: Republican
- Spouse: Helen Hammans
- Relations: H. R. Gross
- Children: 3

L. W. (Joe) Gross (October 27, 1925 – August 2, 2004), was an American politician from the state of Iowa.

Gross was born October 27, 1925, in Fort Morgan, Colorado to Lester and Opal Gross. Joe's father Lester was a younger brother of H. R. Gross. He graduated from Arispe High School in Arispe, Iowa in 1943. He was a Navy veteran of World War II. He married Helen Hammans in 1945. He served as a Republican in the Iowa House of Representatives from 1981 to 1983. Gross died August 2, 2004, in Mount Ayr.

Iowa House of Representatives
Preceded by Arlo Hullinger	94th district 1981–1983	Succeeded by William H. Harbor
