= Charles Balloun =

American politician (1904–1995)

Member of the Iowa Senate from the 21st district
- In office January 11, 1971 – January 7, 1973
- Preceded by: Alan Shirley
- Succeeded by: John S. Murray

Member of the Iowa Senate from the 25th district
- In office January 9, 1967 – January 10, 1971
- Preceded by: Eugene Hill
- Succeeded by: John M. Walsh

Member of the Iowa Senate from the 22nd district
- In office March 2, 1965 – January 8, 1967
- Preceded by: Robert Burrows
- Succeeded by: James Schaben

Member of the Iowa House of Representatives from the 50th district
- In office January 9, 1961 – January 10, 1965
- Preceded by: Neil E. Johns
- Succeeded by: Albert H. Detje

Personal details
- Born: September 21, 1904 Dardanelle, Arkansas
- Died: February 17, 1995 (aged 90) Marshalltown, Iowa
- Party: Republican

Charles Balloun (September 21, 1904 – February 17, 1995) was an American politician who served in the Iowa House of Representatives from 1961 to 1965 and in the Iowa Senate from 1965 to 1973.

He died of a heart condition on February 17, 1995, in Marshalltown, Iowa, at age 90.
