= Devon Wood =

American politician

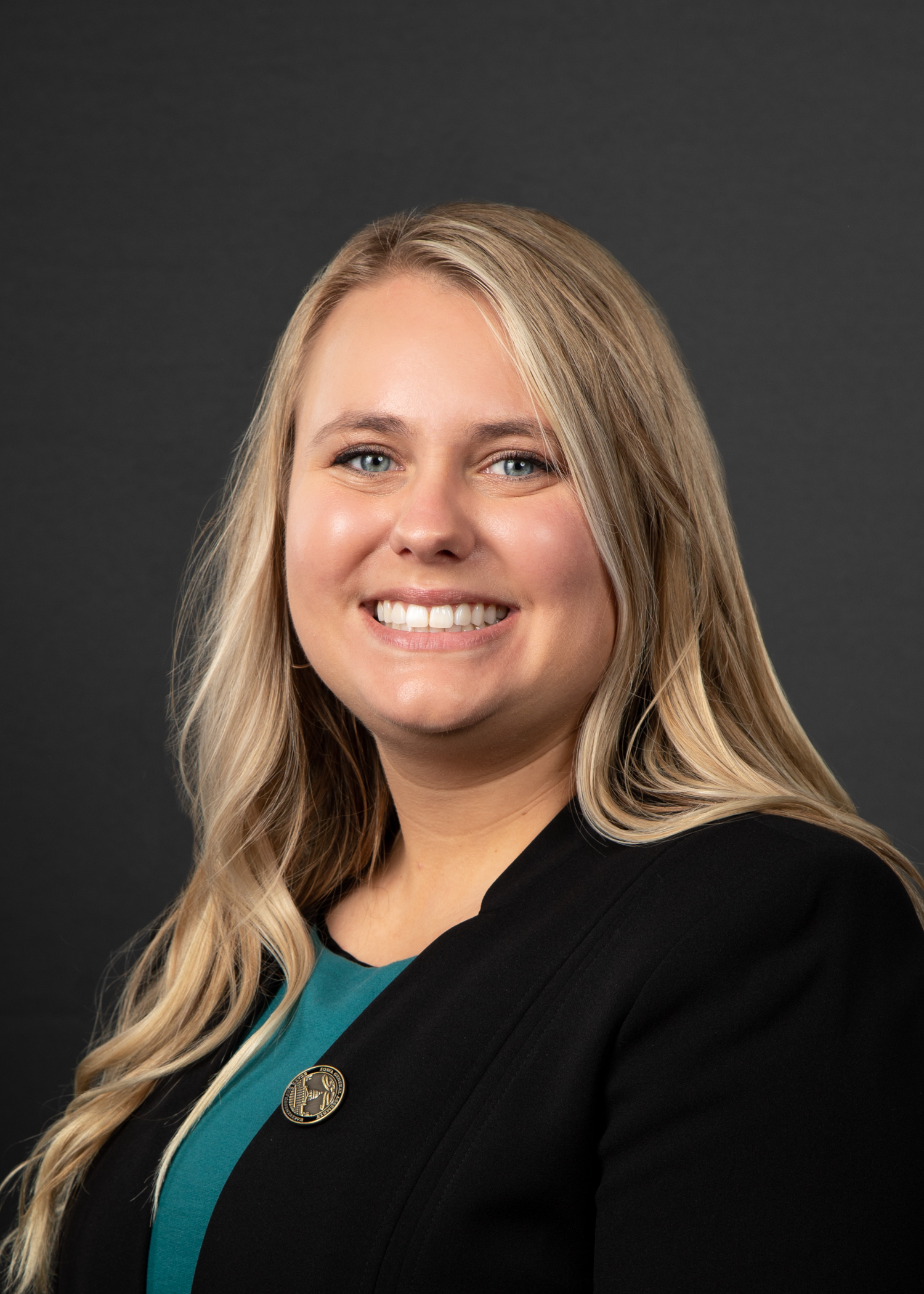

Member of the Iowa House of Representatives from the 17th district
- Incumbent
- Assumed office 9 January 2023
- Preceded by: Matt Windschitl

Personal details
- Party: Republican
- Education: Simpson College

Devon Wood is an American politician who has served in the Iowa House of Representatives since 2023, representing the 17th district as a Republican.

== Personal life ==
Wood's father is a farmer, and her mother is a teacher. She graduated from Shenandoah High School in Shenandoah, Iowa in 2015, and is a resident of New Market, Iowa. She later attended Simpson College but did not graduate. Wood wrote for The Simpsonian student publication between 2018 and 2020, and also played softball for the Simpson College Storm.

== Political career ==
While attending college, Wood led the Simpson College Republicans and was vice chair and later chair of the Iowa Federation of College Republicans. She also worked for state legislators Clel Baudler and Mary Ann Hanusa.

After incumbent legislator Matt Windschitl was redistricted from District 17 of the Iowa House of Representatives and Cecil Dolecheck announced his retirement, Wood decided to run for office. She defeated Paul Dykstra, who previously served as a Ringgold County supervisor, in the Republican Party primary. Wood won the general election against Pat Shipley, a teacher, and mayor of Nodaway, Iowa, affiliated with the Democratic Party.

=== Committee assignments ===
Wood serves on the following committees in the General Assembly:

- Natural Resources (chair)
- Economic Growth and Technology (vice chair)
- Appropriations
- Health and Human Services
- Transportation
