= Vernon A. Ewell =

American politician

Member of the Iowa House of Representatives from the 66th district
- In office 1969–1971

Member of the Iowa House of Representatives from the 39th district
- In office 1971–1973

Personal details
- Born: December 14, 1936 (age 89) Omaha, Nebraska, U.S.
- Party: Democratic
- Education: Iowa State Teachers College

Vernon A. Ewell (born December 14, 1936) is an American politician. He served as a Democratic member for the 39th and 66th district of the Iowa House of Representatives.

== Life and career ==
Ewell was born December 14, 1936, in Omaha, Nebraska, to Vernon Ewell and Mrs. Ralph Hirst. He attended Missouri Valley High School and Iowa State Teachers College. He married Sharon Head in 1958 with whom he had two sons. Ewell worked as a teacher of physically and mentally handicapped children.

Ewell served in the Iowa House of Representatives from 1969 to 1973.
