= June Franklin =

American politician (1930–2010)

Aletha June Franklin
- June Franklin, c. 1970

Member of the Iowa House of Representatives from the 37th district
- In office January 9, 1967 – January 10, 1971 Serving with Vernon N. Bennett
- Preceded by: Willie Stevenson Glanton
- Succeeded by: Bill Hansen

Member of the Iowa House of Representatives from the 64th district
- In office January 11, 1971 – January 7, 1973
- Succeeded by: John Connors

Personal details
- Born: Aletha June Franklin; August 31, 1930 Clarinda, Iowa, US
- Died: December 6, 2010 (aged 80) Lebanon, Missouri, US
- Party: Democratic
- Education: Drake University
- Occupation: Politician, activist

Aletha June Franklin (August 31, 1930 – December 6, 2010) was an American politician and civil rights activist. Franklin was elected to the Iowa House of Representatives in 1966. Franklin helped pass Iowa's Fair Housing Practices Law in 1967, and she was with the Iowa House of Representatives for three terms.

== Personal life ==
Franklin was born in Clarinda, Iowa, on August 31, 1930, to parents Glenn H. Franklin and Jean Roper Griggs. She graduated from Clarinda High School in 1948. She then attended Drake University where she earned an associate's degree in business administration.

== Career ==
Franklin was a legal secretary, insurance agent, and real estate agent. Her time in politics began when she was a part of multiple Democratic social clubs, party efforts, and multiple community organizations. She was affiliated with the Polk County Community Action Council, Greater Opportunities Inc, the Des Moines Chapter of the NAACP, Americans for Democratic Action, the John F. Kennedy Democratic Club, and the Polk County Democratic Women's Club. Franklin joined the Iowa House of Representatives in 1966, as the successor of Willie Stevenson Glanton, at 36 years old. During Franklin's first session, she was part of the Appropriations, Schools, Cities, Towns, and Tex revision committees. Franklin was elected as the assistant minority leader of the Democratic House at the 63rd General Assembly. She was the first African American to have that type of leadership position in an Iowa major political party. Franklin communicated and coordinated the activities of officials who were elected by the state. She was concerned with race riots, poverty, and how African American elected officials were treated. Franklin helped pass Iowa's Fair Housing Practices Law in 1967. She was with the Iowa House of Representatives for three terms.

In 1968, at the Iowa State Capitol, Franklin addressed the nation about Martin Luther King Jr.'s assassination. She begged for the "good white people" of the United States to allow the black man to "walk in dignity and equality". Franklin also said that the school board in Des Moines, Iowa should end school segregation, that the city council should let African Americans have jobs, and that the city's welfare recipients are treated in a "humiliating" way. During the speech, she stated that she had sent a telegram to ten members of the Congress and Senate requesting that King's birthday be made a national holiday.

== Death ==
Franklin died on December 6, 2010, in Lebanon, Missouri, due to a long illness.
