= Eddie Andrews (American politician) =

American businessman and politician (born 1966)

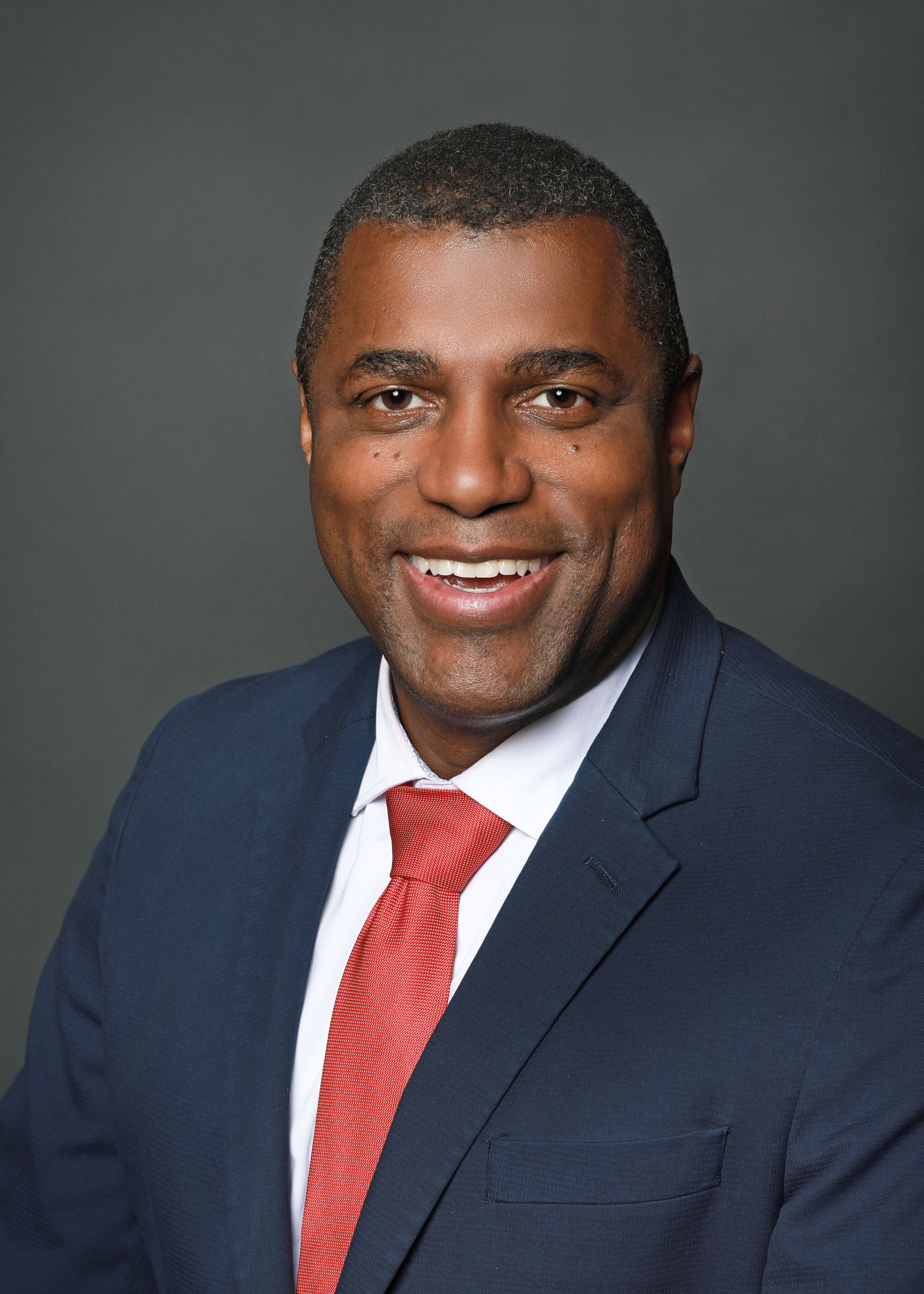
- Official portrait, 2021

Member of the Iowa House of Representatives
- Incumbent
- Assumed office January 11, 2021
- Preceded by: Karin Derry
- Succeeded by: Jill Alesch (elect)
- Constituency: 39th district (2021–2023); 43rd district (2023–present)

Personal details
- Born: Edgar Lee Andrews; May 31, 1966 (age 60) Des Moines, Iowa, U.S.
- Party: Republican
- Education: University of Iowa (BS); University of Massachusetts, Amherst; Iowa State University; Purpose Institute (GrDip); Shiloh University

Edgar Lee Andrews (born May 31, 1966) is an American politician, tech entrepreneur and minister who has served as a member of the Iowa House of Representatives for the 43rd district since 2021. He is a member of the Republican Party. In June 2025, he announced his candidacy for the Republican nomination in the 2026 Iowa gubernatorial election. He placed fifth in the Republican primary.

== Iowa House of Representatives ==
Andrews was elected to the Iowa House November 3, 2020, defeating incumbent Democrat Karin Derry. As a member of the Iowa House of Representatives, Andrews is the Chair of the International Relations Committee, and sits on the Health and Human Services Committee, Natural Resources Committee, Economic Growth and Technology Committee, and the House Veterans Affairs Committee and as a member of the Commerce Committee. Additionally, he co-founded the Taiwan Friendship Caucus and in the past served as the Vice Chair for the Subcommittee on Health and Human Services Appropriations.

=== 2020 election ===
While running in the 2020 election, Andrews highlighted "family safety, education, low taxes and creation of entrepreneur zones to help mom and pop small businesses," but also stressed that mental health issues would be his top priority.

=== 2021 session ===
Andrews ran legislation that would ban spousal-consent requirements for women who are seeking a hysterectomy. On issues of policing, Andrews initially joined Democrats in voting against the "Back the Blue" bill, which created protections for police officers and punishments for protest-related offenses. He later joined Republicans in voting for the bill after the legislation returned from the Senate and was amended. Andrews also pushed a parental rights bill, which would codify parental rights and protections for those rights. The legislation passed the House unanimously, but did not receive a vote in the Senate.

== 2026 Iowa gubernatorial campaign ==
In June 2025, Andrews formally launched his candidacy for the Republican nomination in the 2026 Iowa gubernatorial election.

== Personal life ==
Andrews lives in Johnston, Iowa, and attended the University of Iowa where he obtained an bachelor's in electrical and computer engineering, began master's programs at the University of Massachusetts, Amherst and Iowa State University, completed his ministerial training at the Purpose Institute, and has begun a master's in biblical languages at Shiloh University. Andrews works in tech.

Andrews is married to Betty Andrews, his high school sweetheart, who, as of 2023, serves as the director of the NAACP Chapter for Iowa and Nebraska. Together they raised two daughters, a niece, and adopted a son who died. Andrews founded #mentoromics, a now-private youth program that teaches free coding specifically for making entrepreneurs with STEM skills. He founded the Des Moines Spanish Conversation group two decades ago, co-pastored Iglesia Pentecostal del Nombre de Jesus for a decade, and helped plant a Swahili congregation from Eastern Africa.

== Electoral history ==
2020 Iowa House of Representatives General Election for the 39th District
Party	Candidate	Votes	%
Republican	Eddie Andrews	12,455	50.8
Democratic	Karin Derry	12,040	49.1
N/A	Other/Write-in Candidates	24	.1
Total votes		24,519	100.0
