= Donald Beneke =

American lawyer and politician (1916–1990)

Donald G. Beneke

Member of the Iowa Senate from the 37th district
- In office 14 January 1963 – 8 January 1967
- Preceded by: John A. Walker
- Succeeded by: Charles S. Van Eaton; Alden Erskine

Member of the Iowa Senate from the 50th district
- In office 4 May 1961 – 13 January 1963
- Preceded by: Guy G. Butler
- Succeeded by: Lucas DeKoster

Personal details
- Born: 14 March 1916 Laurens, Iowa
- Died: 17 February 1990 (aged 73) Pocahontas, Iowa
- Party: Republican
- Education: University of Iowa

Donald G. Beneke (March 14, 1916 – February 17, 1990) was an American lawyer and politician.

Beneke was born to parents Anton and Theresa Mefferd Beneke in Laurens, Iowa, on March 14, 1916. He attended high school in his hometown. After graduating in 1933, Beneke attended the University of Iowa and its College of Law, completing his bachelor's degree in 1937, and a Juris Doctor in 1939. Beneke had six siblings, including Raymond Beneke, an economist and professor at Iowa State University.

Donald Beneke was associated with the Laurens school board from 1947 to 1961, as secretary, regular member, and later president. Between 1951 and 1954, he was district attorney for Pocahontas County. Beneke was nominated in April 1961 as the Republican candidate for a special election to the Iowa Senate the following month, defeated Democratic candidate James Hamilton in the election, and duly took office in District 50 on 4 May 1961. In November 1962, Beneke won a full term in District 37. After stepping down from the state legislature in 1965, Beneke served as president of the Pocahontas County Board of Education and contested a seat on the Area 5 Education Agency in 1974. By 1980, Beneke had been designated mental health referee for Pocahontas County. At the time of his death at Pocahontas Community Hospital on February 17, 1990, Beneke was director of the Laurens State Bank and serving as Laurens city attorney.
