= Dawn Pettengill =

American politician (born 1955)

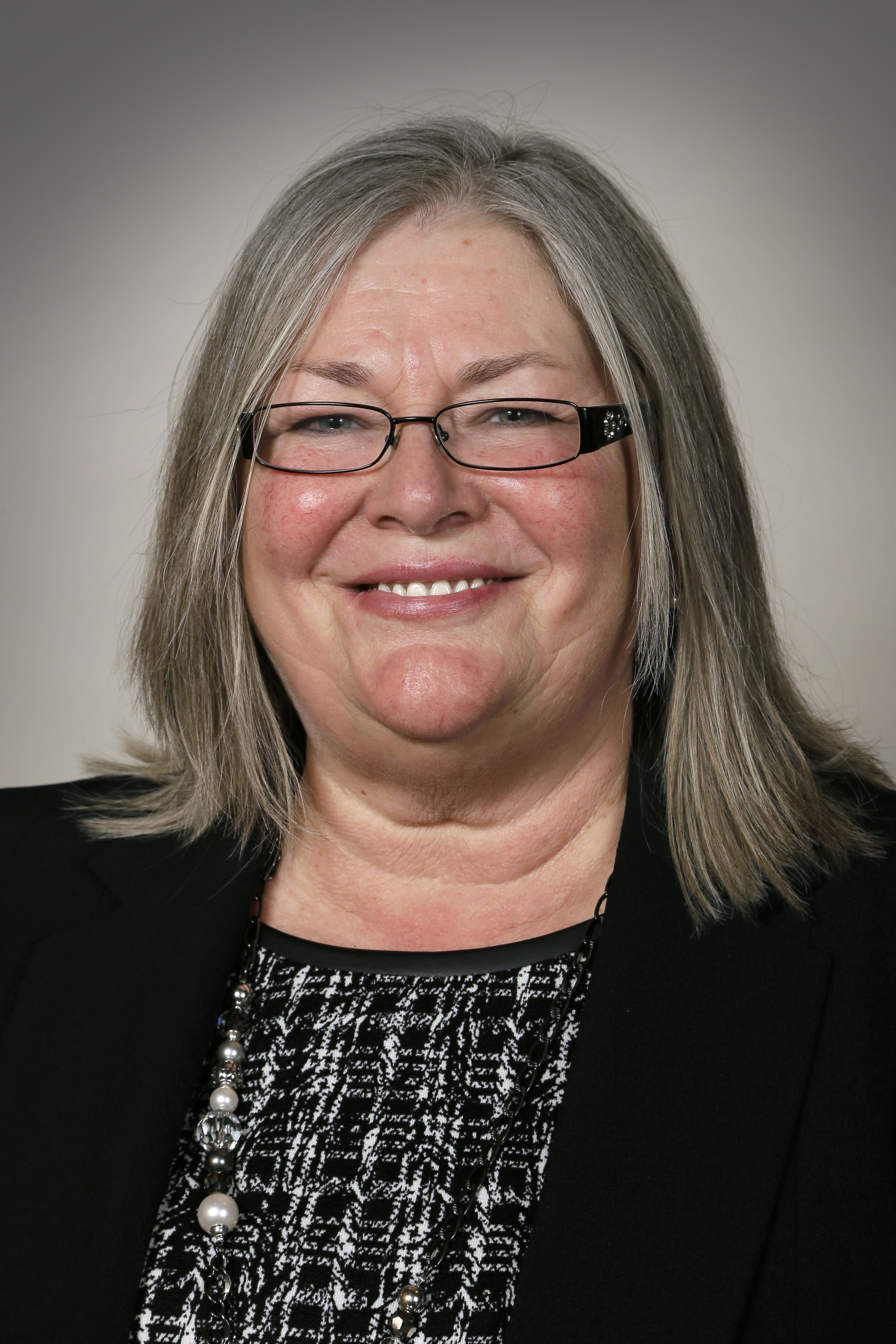

Member of the Iowa House of Representatives from the 75th district 39th (2005–2013)
- In office January 10, 2005 – January 13, 2019
- Preceded by: Dell Hanson
- Succeeded by: Thomas Gerhold

Personal details
- Party: Democratic (before 2007); Republican (2007–present)
- Website: dawnpettengill.com legis.iowa.gov/...

Dawn E. Pettengill (born July 2, 1955) is an American retired politician from Iowa. She was a member of the Iowa House of Representatives from 2005 to 2019, where she represented the 75th District (numbered as the 39th District until January 2013). On April 30, 2007, she switched to the Republican Party, having previously served in the House as a Democrat. In a letter to her constituents, Pettengill said she decided to switch parties due to disagreements with fiscal and labor policy, as well as the state Democratic Party's decision to take her off the incumbent protection list for the 2008 elections.

Within the Iowa House, Pettengill served on several committees, among them the Commerce, Government Oversight, Government Oversight (Joint), State Government, and Ways and Means committees. She also serves as the vice chair of the Administrative Rules Review Committee and was co-chair of the Public Retirement Systems Committee and as a member of the Investment Board of the Iowa Public Employees' Retirement System.

== Electoral history ==
Pettengill was first elected in 2004, defeating incumbent Republican Dell Hanson. She subsequently won re-election in 2006, defeating Republican opponent Connie Jacobsen. She switched parties in 2008, and proceeded to defeat Democratic opponent Terry Hertle. Pettengill was unopposed in 2010, and defeated Democrat Sandra Cronbaugh in 2012, Steve Beck in 2014 and Paula Denison in 2016.

*incumbent

Election	Political result	Candidate	Party	Votes	%
Iowa House of Representatives elections, 2004; District 39; Turnout: 14,876	Democratic gain from Republican	Dawn Pettengill	Democratic	8,086	54.4
Iowa House of Representatives elections, 2004; District 39; Turnout: 14,876	Democratic gain from Republican	Dell Hanson*	Republican	6,780	45.6
Iowa House of Representatives elections, 2006; District 39; Turnout: 11,296	Democratic hold	Dawn Pettengill*	Democratic	6,365	56.3
Iowa House of Representatives elections, 2006; District 39; Turnout: 11,296	Democratic hold	Connie Jacobsen	Republican	4,759	42.1
Iowa House of Representatives elections, 2008; District 39; Turnout: 15,191	Republican hold	Dawn Pettengill*	Republican	8,291	54.6
Iowa House of Representatives elections, 2008; District 39; Turnout: 15,191	Republican hold	Terry Hertle	Democratic	6,893	45.4
Iowa House of Representatives elections, 2010; District 39	Republican hold	Dawn Pettengill*	Republican	unopposed	

Iowa House of Representatives
Preceded by Dell Hanson	39th District; 2005–2013	Succeeded by Jake Highfill
Preceded by Guy Vander Linden	75th District; 2013–present	Succeeded by Incumbent
