= Iowa's 94th House of Representatives district =

American legislative district

House District 94
- Type: District of the Lower house
- Location: Iowa
- Representative: Mike Vondran
- Parent organization: Iowa General Assembly

The 94th District of the Iowa House of Representatives in the state of Iowa. It is currently composed of part of Scott County.

== Current elected officials ==
Mike Vondran is the representative currently representing the district.

== Past representatives ==
The district has previously been represented by:

- Thomas M. Dougherty, 1971–1973
- Quentin V. Anderson, 1973–1975
- Arlo Hullinger, 1975–1981
- Joe Gross, 1981–1983
- William H. Harbor, 1983–1993
- Robert L. Kistler, 1993–1995
- Jerry D. Main, 1995–1997
- Rebecca Reynolds, 1997–2003
- Kurt Swaim, 2003–2013
- Linda Miller, 2013–2016
- Gary Mohr, 2017–2023
