= Wilson Davis =

American politician (1917–2003)

Member of the Iowa Senate from the 1st district
- In office September 9, 1969 – January 10, 1971
- Preceded by: Seeley Lodwick
- Succeeded by: Lucas DeKoster

Member of the Iowa Senate from the 50th district
- In office January 11, 1971 – January 7, 1973
- Preceded by: district created
- Succeeded by: James W. Griffin

Personal details
- Born: Wilson Lloyd Davis; August 5, 1917 Goodrich, North Dakota
- Died: December 18, 2003 (aged 86) Keokuk, Iowa
- Party: Republican

Wilson Lloyd Davis (August 5, 1917 – December 18, 2003) was an American engineer and politician.

Wilson Davis, born on August 5, 1917, in Goodrich, North Dakota, was the youngest of three sons born to James Ellsworth and Helen Wilson Davis. His eldest brother John served as Governor of North Dakota from 1957 to 1961.

Wilson Davis played football, hockey, and tennis at Bismarck Senior High School. After graduating from high school, Davis earned a dual degree in mechanical engineering and business at the University of Minnesota. He subsequently worked for Honeywell, and during World War II, was a civilian engineering adviser to the United States Navy and Army Air Forces.

Davis met and married Minneapolis native Enid Dygert during his time in Minnesota. The couple moved to Keokuk, Iowa, in 1948. He acquired the Seither & Cherry Company, and expanded it into an electrical, plumbing, heating, ventilation, and air conditioning contractor active in several states. Additionally, Davis founded the eponymous Davis Development Corporation and owned a ranch in Sheridan County, North Dakota.

Throughout his political career, Davis was affiliated with the Republican Party. He won a 1969 special election to represent the 1st district of the Iowa Senate, taking office on September 9, 1969. Prior to the 1970 Iowa Senate election, Davis was redistricted from the first district to the 50th district. Davis completed his term in office on January 7, 1973.

After retiring in the 1980s, Davis split his time between Keokuk, Iowa, and Naples, Florida. He died in Keokuk on December 18, 2003, of Alzheimer's disease complications.
