= Harold Thordsen =

American politician (1907–1999)

Harold Arthur Thordsen (September 25, 1907 – November 8, 1999) was an American politician, police officer, and football player.

== Career ==
Harold Thordsen was a Davenport, Iowa, native born on September 25, 1907, to parents Jess C. and Hazel D. Thordsen. His younger brother was actor Kelly Thordsen. Harold Thordsen graduated from Davenport High School, and played American football for the Moline Indians for four professional seasons. During the 1930s, he joined the Davenport Police Department, and, in 1942, became the first person within the department to graduate from the National Police Academy run by the Federal Bureau of Investigation. During World War II, Thordsen served as a FBI agent. After the war ended, he served in the United States Navy for some time. Thordsen became a real estate broker upon ending his eighteen-year career in Davenport law enforcement, which included a stint as chief of detectives.

Politically, Thordsen was affiliated with the Republican Party. Prior to his election to the Iowa General Assembly, Thordsen served on the Davenport city council as an at-large alderman. He served a two-year term on the Iowa House of Representatives for District 43 from January 9, 1967, to January 12, 1969, followed by four years on the Iowa Senate, first for District 15 from January 13, 1969, to January 10, 1971, then for District 39 from January 11, 1971, to January 7, 1973. After stepping down from the Iowa legislature, Thordsen moved to Wisconsin Dells, Wisconsin, for four years as owner-operator of a resort located there.

Thordsen was married to his first wife Reva Ashcraft from 1928 to her death in 1964. Later that year, he married Ruby McKinney. McKinney died in 1990, and Thordsen married Carolyn Bertram in Bondurant, Iowa in 1994. Thordsen died on November 8, 1999, in Davenport.
