= Jill Alesch =

American politician

Member of the Iowa House of Representatives from the 43rd district
- Member-elect
- Assumed office January 1, 2027
- Preceded by: Eddie Andrews

Personal details
- Party: Democratic
- Education: University of Northern Iowa; Drake University Law School
- Website: jill4iowa.com

Jill Alesch is an American politician. A member of the Democratic Party, she was elected to the Iowa House of Representatives in 2026, representing the 43rd district. She was elected in the 2026 election. She ran for the Johnston School Board in 2025. She is an attorney and retired Iowa Army National Guard veteran of the War in Afghanistan.
