= Thomas M. Dougherty =

American politician (1910–1996)

Member of the Iowa House of Representatives from the 94th district
- In office January 11, 1971 – January 7, 1973
- Succeeded by: Quentin V. Anderson

Member of the Iowa House of Representatives from the 16th district
- In office January 13, 1969 – January 10, 1971
- Succeeded by: James E. Wirtz
- In office January 11, 1965 – January 8, 1967

Member of the Iowa House of Representatives from the 17th district
- In office February 18, 1964 – January 10, 1965

Personal details
- Born: February 2, 1910 Eddyville, Iowa, U.S.
- Died: September 5, 1996 (aged 86) Albia, Iowa, U.S.
- Party: Democratic
- Spouse: Lucille Mottet (m. 1955)
- Children: 1
- Occupation: Politician, farmer

Thomas M. Dougherty (February 2, 1910 – September 5, 1996) was an American politician and farmer.

Dougherty was born on an Eddyville, Iowa, farm on February 2, 1910, to parents John H. and Jennie Dougherty. He graduated from St. Patrick's High School in unincorporated Georgetown in 1928 and continued working on the family farm. Dougherty was a member of several agricultural associations. He was seated in the Iowa House of Representatives on February 18, 1964, as a Democratic legislator representing District 17. Dougherty subsequently won two full terms for District 16, and served his third and final full term representing District 94. Dougherty died on September 5, 1996, in Albia.
