= Jake Highfill =

American politician (born 1990)

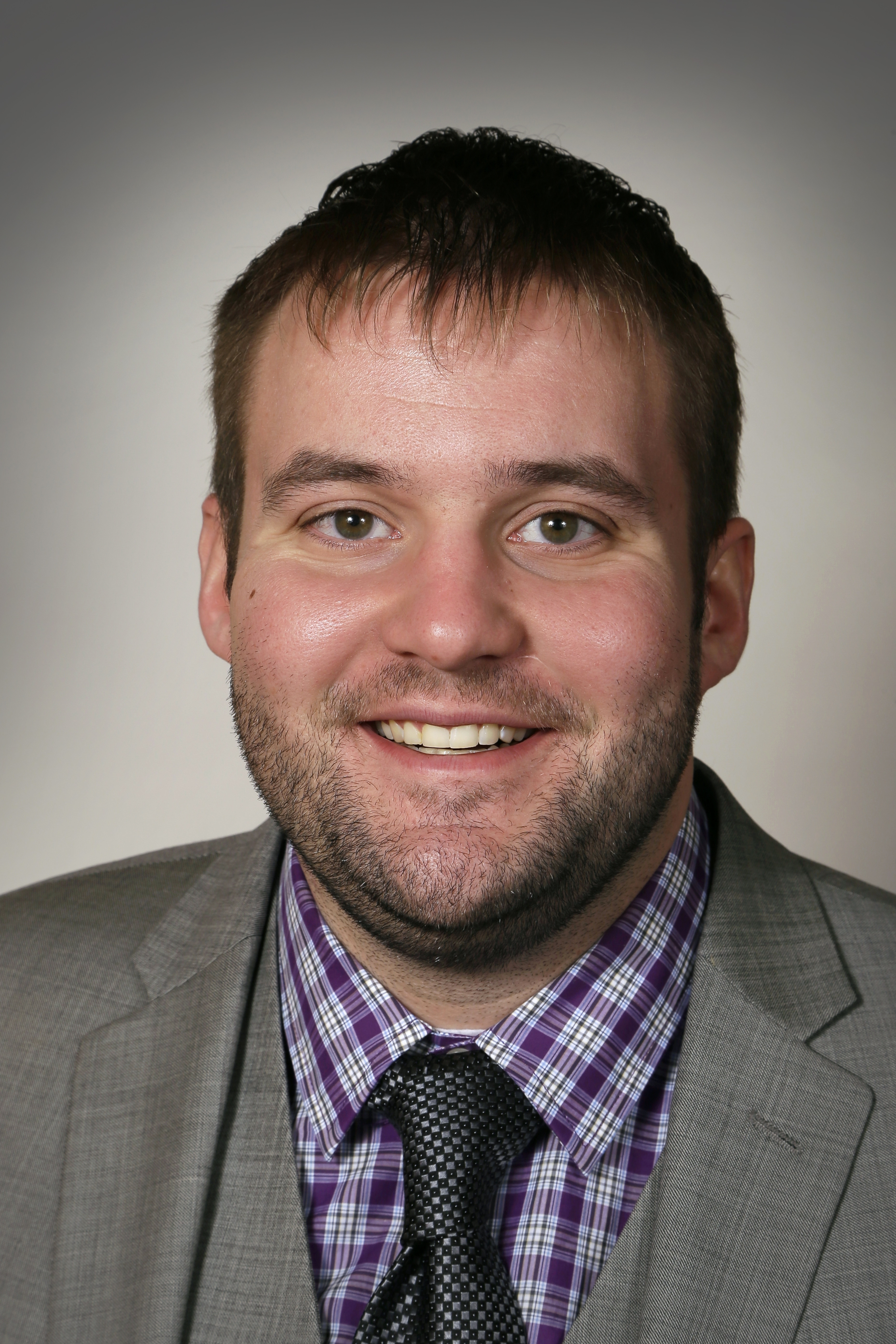

Member of the Iowa House of Representatives from the 39th district
- In office January 14, 2013 – November 6, 2018
- Preceded by: Dawn Pettengill
- Succeeded by: Karin Derry

Personal details
- Born: March 3, 1990 (age 36) Marshalltown, Iowa, U.S.
- Party: Republican
- Education: University of Iowa
- Website: legis.iowa.gov/...

Jake Highfill (born March 3, 1990) is the former Iowa State Representative from the 39th District. A Republican, he served in the Iowa House of Representatives from 2013 - 2018. Highfill resides in Johnston, Iowa. He has a bachelor's degree in business from the University of Iowa.

Highfill served on several committees in the Iowa House – the Appropriations, Local Government, and Natural Resources committees. He also served as the vice chair of the State Government committee and was a member of the Education Appropriations Subcommittee. Highfill defeated incumbent Erik Helland, the House majority whip, to win the Republican nomination in 2012.

Highfill was defeated by Democrat Karin Derry in the November 6, 2018, general election.

== Electoral history ==
*incumbent

Election	Political result	Candidate	Party	Votes	%	±%
Iowa House of Representatives general elections, 2018; District 39; Turnout: 9,658	Democratic Iowa Democratic Party	Karin Derry	Democratic	9,658	49.80%	
Iowa House of Representatives general elections, 2018; District 39; Turnout: 9,658	Democratic Iowa Democratic Party	Jake Highfill*	Republican	9,353	48.30%	
Iowa House of Representatives general elections, 2012; District 39; Turnout: 19,289	Republican (newly redistricted)	Jake Highfill	Republican	9,218	47.79%	
Iowa House of Representatives general elections, 2012; District 39; Turnout: 19,289	Republican (newly redistricted)	Kelsey Clark	Democratic	8,466	43.89%	

Iowa House of Representatives
Preceded by Dawn Pettengill	39th District; 2013–2018	Succeeded by Karin Derry
