= Lucas DeKoster =

American politician (1918–2000)

Member of the Iowa Senate from the 1st district
- In office January 11, 1971 – January 9, 1983
- Preceded by: Wilson Lloyd Davis
- Succeeded by: Milo Colton

Member of the Iowa Senate from the 49th district
- In office January 9, 1967 – January 10, 1971
- Preceded by: H. Kenneth Nurse
- Succeeded by: Gene W. Glenn

Member of the Iowa Senate from the 50th district
- In office January 11, 1965 – January 8, 1967
- Preceded by: Donald G. Beneke
- Succeeded by: district obsolete

Personal details
- Born: Lucas James DeKoster; June 18, 1918 Hull, Iowa
- Died: February 23, 2000 (aged 81) Hull, Iowa
- Party: Republican

Lucas James DeKoster (June 18, 1918 – February 23, 2000) was an American politician who served in the Iowa Senate from 1965 to 1983.

He was born to parents John and Sarah Katherine DeKoster in Hull, Iowa, on June 18, 1918. After graduating from Hull High School in his hometown, DeKoster successively attended Kansas State College and Iowa State College, completing a bachelor's degree in mechanical engineering in 1939. He was a designer of jet-propulsion engines for the aeronautical industry and worked in New Jersey, Virginia and Ohio. While an Ohio resident, DeKoster studied at the Cleveland–Marshall College of Law. Upon passing the Iowa bar exam in June 1952, DeKoster returned to Hull and practiced general and patent law.

DeKoster won election to the Iowa Senate for the first time in 1964, as a Republican legislator representing District 50. He subsequently served a four-year term for District 49 starting in 1967, and thereafter held the District 1 seat until stepping down in 1983. In 1970, he was a Republican candidate for floor leader of the senate. Ten years after stepping down from the state senate, DeKoster served on the Iowa Senate Ethics Committee.

After his retirement from politics, DeKoster undertook an in-depth study of his family's genealogy and self-published a history/memoir entitled The Books of Our Years.

DeKoster married Dorothea LaVonne Hymans in 1942, with whom he raised five children. He died in Hull on February 23, 2000, aged 81. The University of Iowa Libraries hold separate collections for DeKoster and his mother Sarah.
