= Arlo Hullinger =

American politician (1921–2021)

Member of the Iowa House of Representatives
- In office 1965–1981

Personal details
- Born: August 29, 1921 Decatur County, Iowa, U.S.
- Died: December 27, 2021 (aged 100) Osceola, Iowa, U.S.
- Party: Democratic
- Occupation: Farmer

Arlo Victor Hullinger (August 29, 1921 – December 27, 2021) was an American politician in the state of Iowa.

== Life and career ==
Hullinger was born in Decatur County, Iowa on August 29, 1921. He attended Iowa State University and was a farmer. He served in the Iowa House of Representatives from 1965 to 1981 as a Democrat. Hullinger died in Osceola, Iowa on December 27, 2021, at the age of 100.

Iowa House of Representatives
Preceded by Quentin V. Anderson	94th district 1975–1981	Succeeded by Joe Gross
