= Lester Sickels =

American politician

Lester Sickels (27 June 1909 – 21 March 2001) was an American politician.

Sickels was born on a farm near Grant City, Missouri, on 27 June 1909. His family soon moved to Ringgold County, Iowa, where he spent most of his life and later ran his own farm. He served on the local and county boards of education for thirteen and twelve years, respectively. Some of Sickels's school board tenures overlapped with his service on the Iowa House of Representatives. Between 1959 and 1963, he represented House District 7 as a Republican. After stepping down from the state legislature, Sickels was appointed to a citizen's advocacy committee that predated and, in 1979, became the fifth judicial district's board of corrections, on which he remained until 1984. Sickels died at the age of 92 on 21 March 2001.
