= Elbert Watson =

American politician (1912–1967)

Elbert Minor Watson (18 May 1912 – 22 October 1967) was an American politician.

Elbert Watson was born on 18 May 1912 in Ringgold County, Iowa, and attended schools in Diagonal. He pursued further study at Creston Junior College, Simpson College, and the University of Iowa. Outside of politics, Watson was a banker and insurance agent. He was a member of the local and county boards of education prior to election to the state legislature. Watson was elected to the Iowa House of Representatives as a Republican for District 7 in November 1966, and served from 9 January 1967 to his death on 22 October 1967.
