= Karin Derry =

American politician

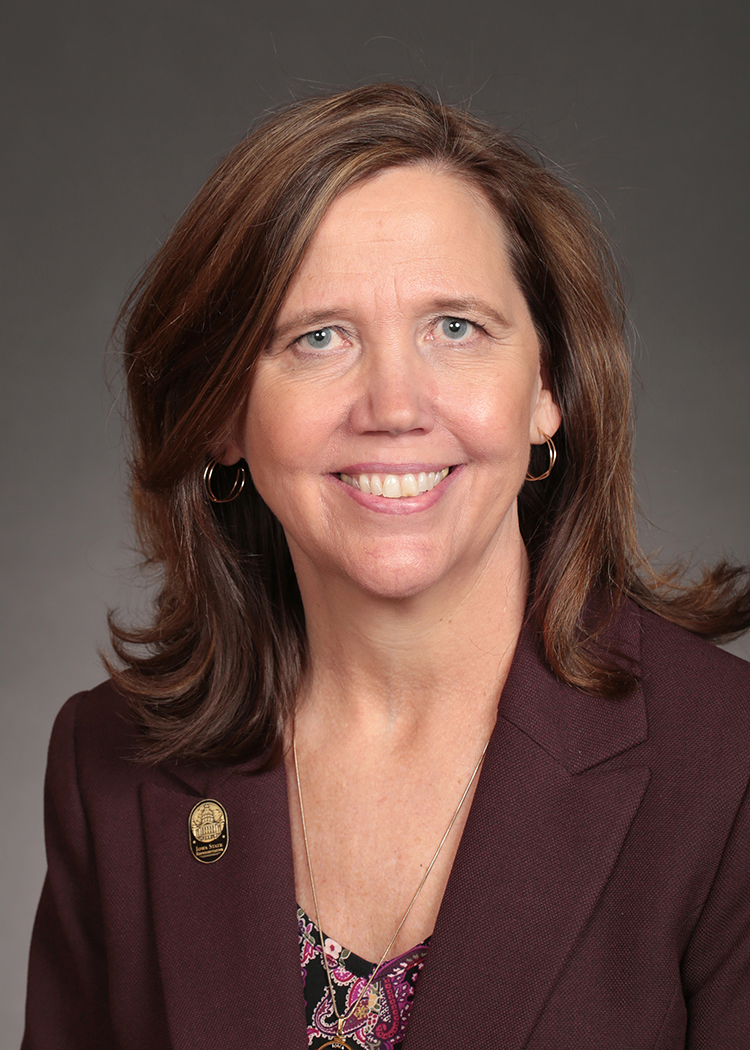

Member of the Iowa House of Representatives from the 39th district
- In office January 14, 2019 – January 11, 2021
- Preceded by: Jake Highfill
- Succeeded by: Eddie Andrews

Personal details
- Party: Democratic
- Spouse: Jeff
- Children: 3
- Education: University of Iowa; Drake University
- Occupation: Attorney

Karin Derry is an American politician. She is a Democrat who represented the 39th district in the Iowa House of Representatives from 2018 to 2020.

== Early life ==
Derry holds a Bachelor of Arts degree from the University of Iowa, an MPA from Drake University, and a JD from Drake University School of Law.

== Political career ==
In 2018, Derry ran against Republican incumbent Jake Highfill to represent District 39 in the Iowa House of Representatives, and won. In the 2020 election, she was defeated by Republican candidate Eddie Andrews.

Derry sat on the following standing committees:

- Human Resources
- Judiciary
- State Government

She was also the ranking member on the Administration and Regulation Appropriations Subcommittee.

=== Electoral record ===
2020 general election: Iowa House of Representatives, District 39
Party	Candidate	Votes	%
Democratic	Karin Derry	12,040	49.1%
Republican	Eddie Andrews	12,455	50.8%
	Other/Write-in	24	0.1%

2018 general election: Iowa House of Representatives, District 39
Party	Candidate	Votes	%
Democratic	Karin Derry	9,658	49.8%
Republican	Jake Highfill	9,353	48.3%
Libertarian	Anthony Junk	362	1.9%
	Other/Write-in	9	0.0%
