= Iowa's 43rd House of Representatives district =

American legislative district

House District 43
- Type: District of the Lower house
- Location: Iowa
- Representative: Eddie Andrews
- Parent organization: Iowa General Assembly

The 43rd District of the Iowa House of Representatives in the state of Iowa. It is currently composed of part of Polk County.

== Current elected officials ==
Eddie Andrews is the representative currently representing the district.

== Past representatives ==
The district has previously been represented by:

- Foster F. Felger, 1965–1967
- Elizabeth Orr Shaw, 1967–1971
- Richard M. Radl, 1971–1973
- Sonja Egenes, 1973–1983
- David Osterberg, 1983–1993
- Mona Martin, 1993–2001
- Joe Seng, 2001–2003
- Mark Smith, 2003–2013
- Chris Hagenow, 2013–2019
- Jennifer Konfrst, 2019–2023
- Eddie Andrews, 2023–2027
- Jill Alesch, 2027
