= Dell Hanson =

American politician (born 1935)

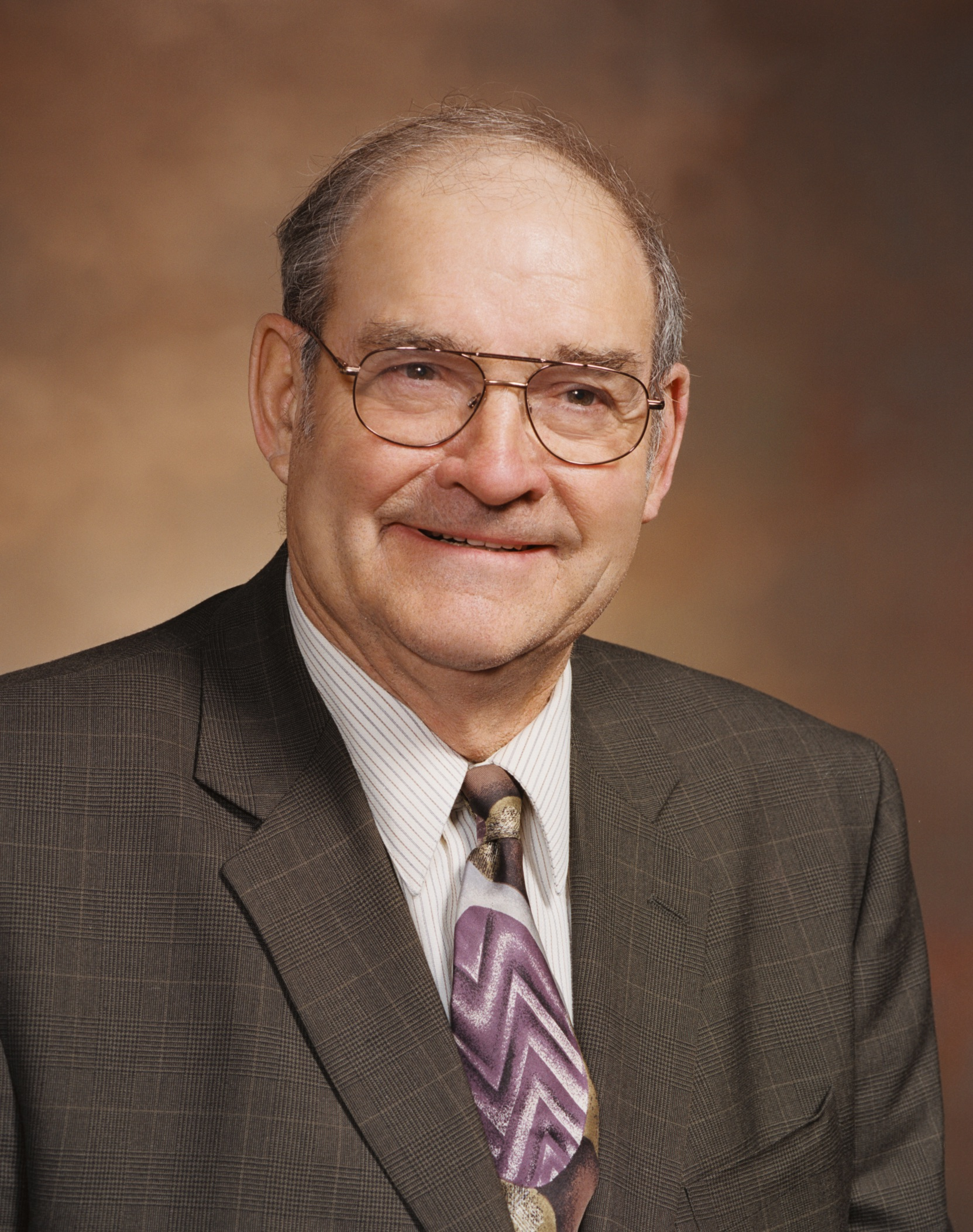

Member of the Iowa House of Representatives
- In office January 13, 2003 – January 9, 2005

Personal details
- Born: March 17, 1935 (age 91) Benton County, Iowa, United States
- Party: Republican
- Occupation: businessman

Dell Hanson (born March 17, 1935) is an American politician in the state of Iowa.

Hanson was born in Benton County, Iowa. He is a businessman (implement dealer) and former county supervisor of Benton County. A Republican, he served in the Iowa House of Representatives from 2003 to 2005 (39th district).
