= S. J. Brownlee =

American politician (1926–2009)

Member of the Iowa Senate from the 8th district
- In office January 11, 1971 – January 7, 1973

Member of the Iowa Senate from the 45th district
- In office October 28, 1969 – January 10, 1971

Personal details
- Born: November 14, 1926 Mallard, Iowa, U.S.
- Died: September 9, 2009 (aged 82) Emmetsburg, Iowa, U.S.
- Party: Republican
- Spouse: Sherry Andersen (m. 1948)
- Children: 3
- Education: University of Iowa (BA)
- Occupation: Politician

Military service
- Allegiance: United States
- Branch/service: United States Navy
- Battles/wars: World War II

S. J. Brownlee (November 14, 1926 – September 9, 2009) was an American politician.

S. J. Brownlee was born in Mallard, Iowa, on November 14, 1926, to parents Orlan J. and Flossie Brownlee. By the time his son turned eight, Orlan Brownlee moved his family to Emmetsburg, and later divested from his farm equipment business to run a farm of his own. S. J. Brownlee graduated from Emmetsburg High School in 1944 and delayed his college education to serve in the United States Navy during World War II. Upon earning his bachelor of arts in economics at the University of Iowa in 1948, Brownlee married Sherry Andersen. He then enrolled at the University of Iowa College of Law for two years and subsequently returned to help run the family farm. S. J. Brownlee later started Brownlee Management to specialize in farm management for farm owners who were not involved in day-to-day farm operations. In 1964, Brownlee began a career in banking, which saw him serve on the board of directors for Iowa Trust and Savings Bank in Emmetsburg, First Federal Savings and Loan, Iowa–Des Moines National Bank, and the State Banking Board for the State of Iowa. In the same decade, Brownlee and Jerry Hofstad bought the Emmetsburg Publishing Company and the local paper. Brownlee sold his share in the venture some time later.

Politically, Brownlee was affiliated with the Republican Party. He began his political career as a member of the Emmetsburg School Board for seven years, which included five as board president. Brownlee was elected to the Iowa Senate in 1968, serving District 45 until being redistricted to District 8 after two years in office. He did not run for reelection in 1972, but was subsequently appointed to the Iowa Board of Regents by Robert D. Ray. In 1981, Brownlee was elevated to president of the Board of Regents, and he served until stepping down from the body in 1985. The following year, the University of Iowa awarded Brownlee its Distinguished Alumni Award. Outside of statewide elected and appointed public office, Brownlee was a founding member of the Palo Alto County Hospital Foundation Board and a member of the ecclesiastical board for the First United Methodist Church in Emmetsburg. Brownlee died in Emmetsburg on September 9, 2009.
