= Arthur Neu =

American politician (1933–2015)

Arthur Alan Neu
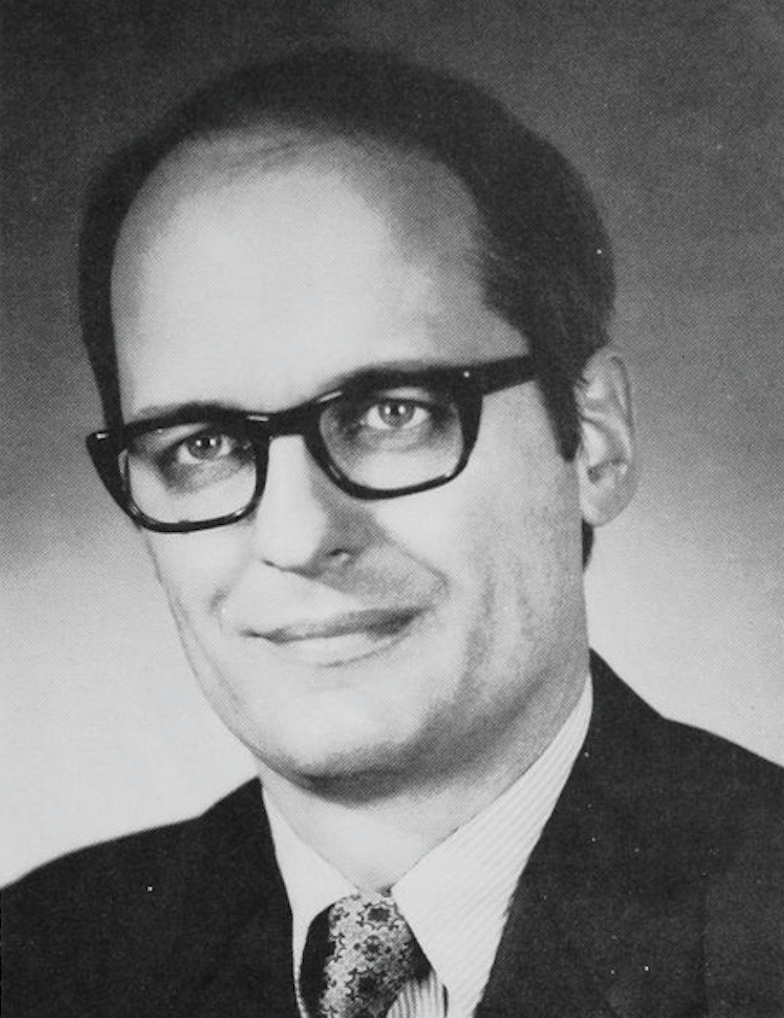

Mayor of Carroll
- In office 1982–1985

39th Lieutenant Governor of Iowa
- In office January 18, 1973 – January 12, 1979
- Governor: Robert D. Ray
- Preceded by: Roger Jepsen
- Succeeded by: Terry Branstad

Member of the Iowa Senate
- In office January 9, 1967 – January 7, 1973
- Constituency: 29th District (1967-1971); 14th District (1971-1973)

Personal details
- Born: February 9, 1933 Carroll, Iowa, U.S.
- Died: January 2, 2015 (aged 81) Des Moines, Iowa, U.S.
- Party: Republican
- Spouse: Mary Naomi Bedwell
- Children: 3
- Profession: Lawyer

Arthur Alan Neu (February 9, 1933 – January 2, 2015) was an American Republican politician and lawyer who served as the Lieutenant Governor of Iowa from 1973 to 1979.

== Early life ==
In 1933, Neu was born in Carroll, Iowa.

== Education ==
Neu received his bachelors and law degrees from Northwestern University. He was admitted to the Iowa bar and practiced law in Carroll.

== Career ==
Neu's career began as a lawyer in Carroll, Iowa. From 1967 to 1973, Neu served in the Iowa State Senate. Neu became a Lieutenant Governor of Iowa under Robert D. Ray. He was succeeded in 1979 by future Governor of Iowa Terry Branstad. From 1982 to 1985, Neu served as the mayor of Carroll, Iowa.

== Personal life ==
Neu was married to Naomi Bedwell. Neu had 3 children. On January 2, 2015, Neu died of pneumonia at a hospital in Des Moines, Iowa. He was 81.

Party political offices
Preceded by Roger Jepsen	Republican Party nominee for Lieutenant Governor of Iowa; 1972, 1974	Succeeded by Terry Branstad
Political offices
Preceded by Roger Jepsen	Lieutenant Governor of Iowa; 1973–1979	Succeeded by Terry E. Branstad
