= Marvin W. Smith =

American politician

Marvin Wesley Smith (25 February 1901 – 13 October 1982) was an American politician.

Marvin Smith was born near Ireton, Iowa, on 25 February 1901. His parents were George W. Smith and Effie Troutman Smith. The Smith family moved near Paullina, where Marvin Smith attended Paullina High School. He graduated from Iowa State College with a degree in animal husbandry and became a farmer and teacher. Smith was involved in agriculture for nearly four decades, raising hogs and cattle. He was a member of the Lyon County School Board for five years. Between 1957 and 1969, Smith was a Republican member of the Iowa House of Representatives for District 82. He contested the 1968 Iowa Senate election, and was elected to office from District 48. Smith was redistricted in 1970 and completed his term as a state senator representing District 2. He died in Paullina on 13 October 1982.
