= Reinhold O. Carlson =

American politician (1905–2006)

Mayor of Des Moines
- In office 1960–1962

Member of the Iowa State Senate from the 29th district
- In office 1971–1973

Personal details
- Born: September 20, 1905 Des Moines, Iowa
- Died: July 7, 2006 (aged 100) Des Moines, Iowa
- Party: Republican
- Spouse: Louise Bergren (m.1937)

Reinhold O. Carlson (September 20, 1905 – July 7, 2006) was an American politician from the state of Iowa.

== Biography ==
Carlson was born to Swedish immigrants in Des Moines, Iowa and attended public schools in Des Moines. He then attended Drake University, Augustana College, and the University of Nebraska. He was a savings and loan executive. Carlson served as Mayor of Des Moines from 1960 to 1962, and on the Des Moines City Council since 1958. He was later elected to the Iowa State Senate, serving the 29th district from 1971 to 1973 as a Republican. He died in Polk County, Iowa at the age of 100.
