= Hugo Schnekloth =

American politician

Member of the Iowa House of Representatives from the 39th district
- In office January 10, 1983 – January 13, 1991
- Preceded by: Thomas E. Swartz
- Succeeded by: Robert L. Rafferty

Member of the Iowa House of Representatives from the 78th district
- In office January 10, 1977 – January 9, 1983
- Preceded by: Brice C. Oakley
- Succeeded by: Dennis L. Renaud

Personal details
- Born: April 24, 1923 Eldridge, Iowa
- Died: June 21, 1996 (aged 73) Davenport, Iowa
- Party: Republican

Hugo Schnekloth (April 24, 1923 – June 21, 1996) was an American politician who served in the Iowa House of Representatives from 1977 to 1991.
