= Rudy Van Drie =

American politician (1931–1976)

Member of the Iowa Senate from the 17th district
- In office January 11, 1971 – January 7, 1973
- Preceded by: Minnette Doderer
- Succeeded by: Barton L. Schwieger

Member of the Iowa House of Representatives from the 52nd district
- In office January 9, 1967 – January 10, 1971
- Preceded by: Maurice Hausheer
- Succeeded by: Richard John Norpel

Personal details
- Born: January 5, 1931 Ashton, Iowa
- Died: October 13, 1976 (aged 45) Ames, Iowa
- Party: Republican

Rudy Van Drie (January 5, 1931 – October 13, 1976) was an American politician who served in the Iowa House of Representatives from the 52nd district from 1967 to 1971 and in the Iowa Senate from the 17th district from 1971 to 1973.
