= Thomas A. Renda =

American politician

Member of the Iowa House of Representatives
- In office 1965–1971

Personal details
- Born: September 19, 1937 (age 88) Des Moines, Iowa, U.S.
- Party: Democratic
- Occupation: lawyer, judge

Thomas A. Renda (born September 19, 1937) was an American politician in the state of Iowa.

Renda was born in Des Moines, Iowa. He attended Drake University and Loras College and is a lawyer and judge. He served in the Iowa House of Representatives from 1965 to 1971 as a Democrat.
