= Willie Stevenson Glanton =

American politician (1922–2017)

Member of the Iowa House of Representatives from the 37th district
- In office 1965–1966
- Preceded by: Howard Reppert
- Succeeded by: Vernon N. Bennett

Personal details
- Born: March 19, 1922 Hot Springs, Arkansas, U.S.
- Died: July 6, 2017 (aged 95) Des Moines, Iowa, U.S.
- Party: Democratic
- Spouse(s): Luther T. Glanton, Jr.
- Website: Glaton's website

Willie Stevenson Glanton (March 19, 1922 – July 6, 2017) was an American lawyer and politician in the state of Iowa. She was a Democrat.

Glanton was born in Hot Springs, Arkansas and attended Tennessee State University and Robert H. Terrell Law School. She moved to Iowa in 1951 and in 1953, became the second African American woman to be admitted to the Iowa Bar.

In 1962, she toured Africa and southeast Asia under a cultural exchange for the U.S. state department.

She was elected to the Iowa House of Representatives in 1964, becoming the first African American woman to sit in that body. She resigned in 1966 to work as a lawyer with the United States Small Business Administration.

She was married to Judge Luther T. Glanton, Jr. and had one son, Luther T., III. In 1986, she was inducted into the Iowa Women's Hall of Fame. In 2010, she was named one of the ten most influential black Iowans by The Des Moines Register. She died in Des Moines on July 6, 2017.
