= Gene Kennedy (politician) =

American politician (1927–2021)

Gene V. Kennedy

Member of the Iowa State Senate
- In office 1971–1975

Member of the Iowa House of Representatives
- In office 1969–1971

Personal details
- Born: October 28, 1927 LeMars, Iowa, United States
- Died: March 7, 2021 (aged 93) Des Moines, Iowa, United States
- Party: Democratic
- Occupation: businessman, insurance, specialty advertiser

Gene Vincent Kennedy (October 28, 1927 – March 7, 2021) was an American politician in the state of Iowa.

Kennedy was born in LeMars, Iowa. He attended Loras College and was a businessman, advertiser, and insurance man. He served in the Iowa State Senate from 1971 to 1975, and House of Representatives from 1969 to 1971 as a Democrat.
