= George Milligan (politician) =

American politician (1934–1990)

Member of the Iowa State Senate
- In office 1971–1975

Member of the Iowa House of Representatives
- In office 1969–1971

Personal details
- Born: February 23, 1934 Des Moines, Iowa, U.S.
- Died: March 17, 1990 (aged 56) Naples, Florida, U.S.
- Party: Republican
- Occupation: banker

George F. Milligan (February 23, 1934 – March 17, 1990) was an American Republican politician in the state of Iowa. He served in the Iowa State Senate from 1971 to 1975, and House of Representatives from 1969 to 1971.

== Education and career ==
Milligan was born in Des Moines, Iowa. A banker, he attended the Washington and Lee University.

In 1974, Milligan ran in the Republican primary against David Stanley for Iowa's Senate seat that was open after Harold Hughes announced his intention to leave after his term was over.

== Death ==
He died in Naples, Florida in 1990 due to a heart ailment.
