= Alden Erskine =

American politician (1901–1991)

Member of the Iowa Senate from the 12th district
- In office January 11, 1971 – January 7, 1973
- Preceded by: Glen Bortell
- Succeeded by: Clifton Lamborn

Member of the Iowa Senate from the 37th district
- In office January 9, 1967 – January 10, 1971
- Preceded by: Donald Beneke
- Succeeded by: Roger Shaff

Personal details
- Born: May 2, 1901 Ticonic, Iowa
- Died: January 13, 1991 (aged 89)
- Party: Republican

Alden Erskine (May 2, 1901 – January 13, 1991) was an American politician who served in the Iowa Senate from 1967 to 1973.
