= James Schaben =

American politician

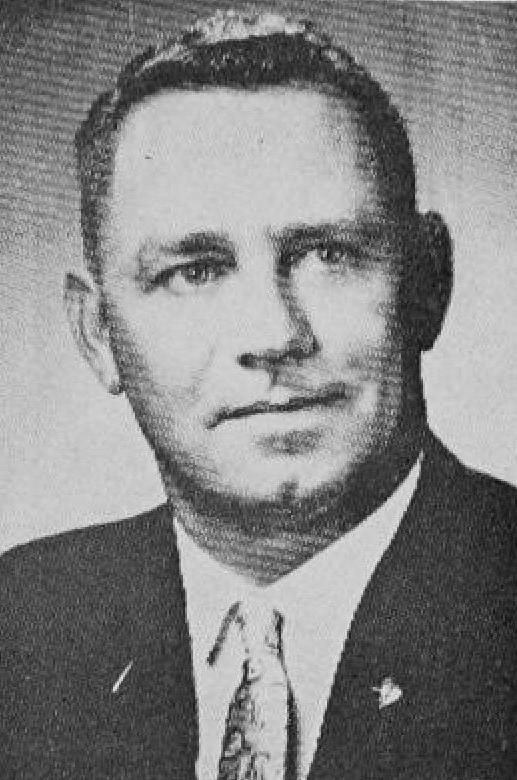

Member of the Iowa Senate from the 27th district
- In office January 11, 1971 – January 12, 1975
- Preceded by: Pearle P. DeHart
- Succeeded by: Louis P. Culver

Member of the Iowa Senate from the 22nd district
- In office January 9, 1967 – January 10, 1971
- Preceded by: Charles F. Balloun
- Succeeded by: Cloyd E. Robinson

Personal details
- Born: May 10, 1926 Earling, Iowa
- Died: August 3, 2013 (aged 87) Omaha, Nebraska
- Party: Democratic

James Schaben (May 10, 1926 – August 3, 2013) was an American politician who served in the Iowa Senate from 1967 to 1975.

He died on August 3, 2013, in Omaha, Nebraska at age 87.

Party political offices
Preceded by Paul Franzenburg	Democratic nominee for Governor of Iowa; 1974	Succeeded by Jerome D. Fitzgerald
