= Dennis L. Freeman =

American politician (1939–2020)

Member of the Iowa House of Representatives
- In office 1969–1975

Personal details
- Born: Dennis Lester Freeman; March 22, 1939 Paton, Iowa, U.S.
- Died: May 31, 2020 (aged 81) Stratford, Iowa, U.S.
- Party: Republican
- Spouse: Mary Lou Hawkinson (m. 1962; died 2006)
- Children: 4
- Education: Gustavus Adolphus College (BS, 1961)
- Occupation: Politician

Dennis Lester Freeman (March 22, 1939 – May 31, 2020) was an American politician who served as a member of the Iowa House of Representatives for six years, from 1969 to 1975.

== Early life and career ==
Freeman was born in Paton, Iowa. He worked in the insurance industry. He served in the Iowa House of Representatives from 1969 to 1975 as a Republican.

== Personal life ==
Freeman attended Gustavus Adolphus College and graduated with a Bachelor of Science in 1961. He married Mary Lou Hawkinson the following year on June 10, 1962, and together they had four children.

== Death ==
He died at age 81 on May 31, 2020, in Stratford, Iowa, due to complications of Parkinson's disease.
