= John M. Walsh =

American politician (born 1940)

Member of the Iowa State Senate
- In office 1967–1973

Personal details
- Born: March 14, 1940 (age 86) Lancaster, Wisconsin, United States
- Party: Republican
- Occupation: department store manager

John M. Walsh (born March 14, 1940) was an American politician in the state of Iowa.

Walsh was born in Lancaster, Wisconsin. He attended St. Andrew's High School there and Loras College, and was a department store manager. He served in the Iowa State Senate from 1967 to 1973 as a Republican.
