= Gene Glenn =

American politician

Member of the Iowa Senate
- In office January 9, 1967 – January 7, 1979
- Constituency: 9th district (1967–1971); 49th district (1971–1973); 45th district (1973–1979)

Member of the Iowa House of Representatives from the 18th district
- In office January 11, 1965 – January 8, 1967

Personal details
- Born: Gene W. Glenn; November 13, 1928 Bladensburg, Iowa, U.S.
- Died: September 30, 2023 (aged 94) Ottumwa, Iowa, U.S.
- Party: Democratic
- Occupation: lawyer

Gene W. Glenn (November 13, 1928 – September 30, 2023) was an American politician in the state of Iowa.

Glenn was born near Bladensburg, Iowa, on November 13, 1928. He attended Iowa State University and George Washington University and was a lawyer. He served in the Iowa Senate from 1967 to 1979, and House of Representatives from 1965 to 1967, as a Democrat. Glenn was named a juvenile referee for judicial district 8A in 1982, and closed his legal practice to take the position for the next seventeen years, retiring with the title of associate juvenile judge.

Glenn died on September 30, 2023, at the Vista Woods Care Center in Ottumwa, Iowa.
