= Minnette Doderer =

American politician (1923–2005)

Member of the Iowa House of Representatives from the 45th district
- In office January 10, 1983 – January 7, 2001
- Preceded by: Dale M. Cochran
- Succeeded by: Vicki Lensing

Member of the Iowa House of Representatives from the 74th district
- In office January 12, 1981 – January 9, 1983
- Preceded by: Dale W. Hibbs
- Succeeded by: Johnie Hammond

Member of the Iowa Senate from the 37th district
- In office January 8, 1973 – January 7, 1979
- Preceded by: Roger John Shaff
- Succeeded by: Arthur A. Small

Member of the Iowa Senate from the 35th district
- In office January 11, 1971 – January 7, 1973
- Preceded by: C. Joseph Coleman
- Succeeded by: Eugene Marshall Hill

Member of the Iowa Senate from the 17th district
- In office January 13, 1969 – January 10, 1971
- Preceded by: Robert J. Burns
- Succeeded by: Rudy Van Drie

Member of the Iowa House of Representatives from the 41st district
- In office February 18, 1964 – January 12, 1969
- Preceded by: Scott Swisher
- Succeeded by: Joseph C. Johnston

Personal details
- Born: May 16, 1923 Holland, Iowa, U.S.
- Died: August 12, 2005 (aged 82) Iowa City, Iowa, U.S.
- Party: Democratic

Minnette Frerichs Doderer (May 16, 1923 – August 12, 2005) was an American politician. She served in the Iowa House of Representatives from 1964 to 1969 and from 1981 to 2001 and in the Iowa Senate from 1969 to 1979.

== Early life ==
Doderer was born on May 16, 1923, in Holland, Iowa. Her parents were John A. Frerichs and Sophie Frerichs (née Sherfield). The family moved to Waterloo, Iowa, where Doderer attended East High School, graduating in 1941. She studied at Iowa State Teachers College and received a bachelor's of arts degree in economics from the University of Iowa in 1948. She married Fred H. Doderer, who would later become the mayor of Iowa City, in 1944 and the couple had two children: Dennis and Kay Lynn.

== Political career ==
Doderer first became involved in Democratic politics during the 1950s, when she served as the vice-chair of the Johnson County Democratic Central Committee between 1953 and 1958. She was elected to the Iowa House of Representatives in a 1964 special election and served as a representative until 1968, including as house minority whip from 1967 to 1968. She was elected to the Iowa Senate between 1968 and 1978, serving as the first female president pro tempore of the senate from 1975 to 1076. She was re-elected to the House in 1981, a position that she held until she retired in 2000.

== Later life ==
She died of colon cancer on August 12, 2005, in Iowa City, Iowa at age 82.

Party political offices
Preceded by Andrew G. Frommelt	Democratic nominee for Lieutenant Governor of Iowa; 1970	Succeeded by William J. Gannon
