= James W. Griffin =

American politician (1935–2023)

Jim Griffin

Member of the Iowa State Senate
- In office 1968–1977

Personal details
- Born: February 13, 1935 Dow City, Iowa, U.S.
- Died: June 25, 2023 (aged 89) Council Bluffs, Iowa, U.S.
- Party: Republican
- Spouse: Mary J. Griffin
- Children: James Griffin Jr., Chris Griffin, John Griffin
- Occupation: Insurance executive

James W. Griffin, Sr. (February 13, 1935 – June 25, 2023) was an American politician in the state of Iowa.

Griffin was born in Dow City, Iowa. He attended Omaha University and is an insurance executive. He served in the Iowa State Senate from 1969 to 1977 as a Republican.
