= John E. Tapscott =

American politician (1930–2017)

Member of the Iowa State Senate
- In office 1971–1973

Member of the Iowa House of Representatives
- In office 1967–1971

Personal details
- Born: January 23, 1930 Des Moines, Iowa, United States
- Died: August 16, 2017 (aged 87) Des Moines, United States
- Party: Democratic
- Occupation: Insurance agent Advertising director

John E. Tapscott (January 23, 1930 – August 16, 2017) was an American politician in the state of Iowa.

Tapscott was born in Des Moines, Iowa. He attended the American Institute of Business and was an insurance agent and an advertising director. He served in the Iowa State Senate from 1971 to 1973, and the Iowa House of Representatives from 1967 to 1971 as a Democrat. He died in 2017 at the age of 87.
