= 1984 Iowa Senate election =

- November 6, 1984

25 out of 50 seats in the Iowa State Senate 26 seats needed for a majority
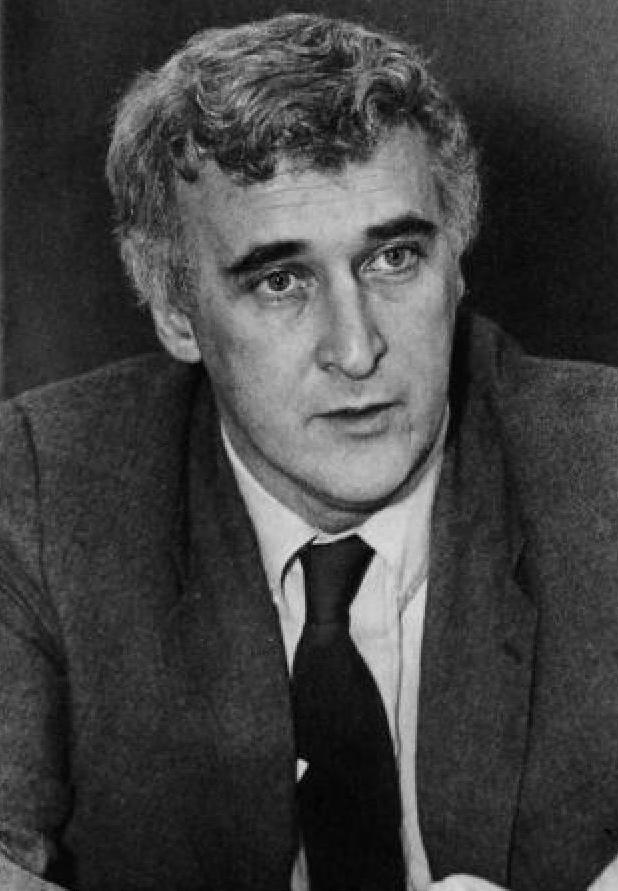

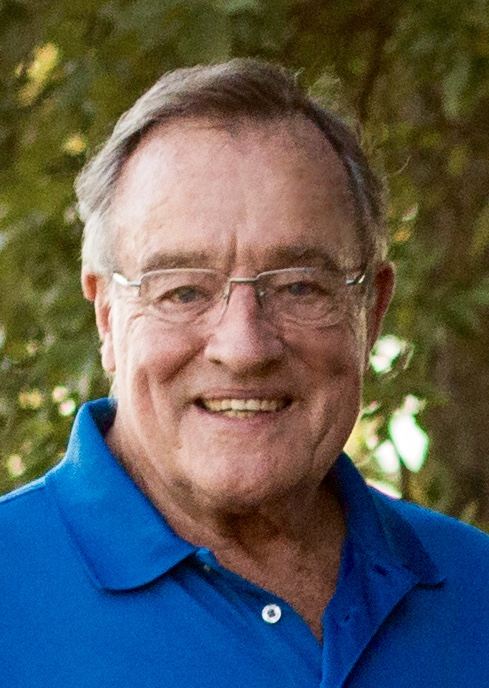
| | Majority party | Minority party |
|---|---|---|
| Leader | Lowell Junkins | Calvin Hultman |
| Party | Democratic | Republican |
| Leader's seat | 31st | 47th |
| Last election | 28 | 22 |
| Seats before | 28 | 22 |
| Seats after | 29 | 21 |
| Seat change | ▲1 | ▼1 |
Majority Leader before election
Lowell Junkins
Democratic
Elected Majority Leader
Lowell Junkins
Democratic

The 1984 Iowa State Senate elections took place as part of the biennial 1984 United States elections. Iowa voters elected state senators in half of the state senate's districts—the 25 even-numbered state senate districts. State senators serve four-year terms in the Iowa State Senate, with half of the seats up for election each cycle. A statewide map of the 50 state Senate districts in the year 1984 is provided by the Iowa General Assembly here.

The primary election on June 5, 1984, determined which candidates appeared on the November 6, 1984 general election ballot. Primary election results can be obtained here. General election results can be obtained here.

Following the previous election, Democrats had control of the Iowa state Senate with 28 seats to Republicans' 22 seats.

To take control of the chamber from Democrats, the Republicans needed to net 4 Senate seats.

Democrats expanded their control of the Iowa State Senate following the 1984 general election with the balance of power shifting to Democrats holding 29 seats and Republicans having 21 seats (a net gain of 1 seat for the Democrats).

== Summary of Results ==
- NOTE: The 25 odd-numbered districts did not have elections in 1984 so they are not listed here.

| State Senate District | Incumbent | Party | Elected Senator | Party |
|---|---|---|---|---|
| 2nd | Donald V. Doyle | Dem | Donald V. Doyle | Democratic |
| 4th | Richard Vande Hoef | Rep | Richard Vande Hoef | Republican |
| 6th | Lee Warren Holt | Rep | Lee Warren Holt | Republican |
| 8th | Berl Priebe | Dem | Berl Priebe | Democratic |
| 10th | Alvin V. Miller | Dem | Alvin V. Miller | Democratic |
| 12th | Ted J. Anderson | Dem | Joy Corning | Republican |
| 14th | James V. Gallagher | Dem | Larry Murphy | Democratic |
| 16th | Dale L. Tieden | Rep | Dale L. Tieden | Republican |
| 18th | Robert M. Carr | Dem | Robert M. Carr | Democratic |
| 20th | Edgar Holden | Rep | Edgar Holden | Republican |
| 22nd | Merlin Hulse | Rep | Beverly Hannon | Democratic |
| 24th | Hurley Hall | Dem | Hurley Hall | Democratic |
| 26th | James D. Wells | Dem | James D. Wells | Democratic |
| 28th | Richard F. Drake | Rep | Richard F. Drake | Republican |
| 30th | Charles Peter Miller | Dem | Charles Peter Miller | Democratic |
| 32nd | Forrest Schwengels | Rep | Forrest Schwengels | Republican |
| 34th | Bass Van Gilst | Dem | John A. Neighbour | Democratic |
| 36th | John E. Soorholtz | Rep | John E. Soorholtz | Republican |
| 38th | Emil J. Husak | Dem | Emil J. Husak | Democratic |
| 40th | George Kinley | Dem | George Kinley | Democratic |
| 42nd | David Readinger | Rep | David Readinger | Republican |
| 44th | Jack Nystrom | Rep | Jack Nystrom | Republican |
| 46th | James E. Briles | Rep | Leonard Boswell | Democratic |
| 48th | Charles W. Hutchins | Dem | Charles W. Hutchins | Democratic |
| 50th | Tom L. Slater | Dem | Michael Gronstal | Democratic |

== Detailed Results ==
- Reminder: Only even-numbered Iowa Senate seats were up for election in 1984; therefore, odd-numbered seats did not have elections in 1984 & are not shown.
- Note: If a district does not list a primary, then that district did not have a competitive primary (i.e., there may have only been one candidate file for that district).

=== District 2 ===
Iowa Senate, District 2 General Election, 1984
| Party | Candidate | Votes | % |
|---|---|---|---|
| Democratic | Donald V. Doyle (incumbent) | 13,782 | 58.2 |
| Republican | Paul C. Jackson | 9,918 | 41.8 |
| Total votes | | 23,700 | 100.0 |
| Democratic hold | | | |

=== District 4 ===
Iowa Senate, District 4 General Election, 1984
| Party | Candidate | Votes | % |
|---|---|---|---|
| Republican | Richard Vande Hoef (incumbent) | 15,634 | 100.0 |
| Total votes | | 15,634 | 100.0 |
| Republican hold | | | |

=== District 6 ===
Iowa Senate, District 6 General Election, 1984
| Party | Candidate | Votes | % |
|---|---|---|---|
| Republican | Lee Holt (incumbent) | 13,540 | 100.0 |
| Total votes | | 13,540 | 100.0 |
| Republican hold | | | |

=== District 8 ===
Iowa Senate, District 8 General Election, 1984
| Party | Candidate | Votes | % |
|---|---|---|---|
| Democratic | Berl Priebe (incumbent) | 16,121 | 100.0 |
| Total votes | | 16,121 | 100.0 |
| Democratic hold | | | |

=== District 10 ===
Iowa Senate, District 10 General Election, 1984
| Party | Candidate | Votes | % |
|---|---|---|---|
| Democratic | Alvin V. Miller (incumbent) | 14,464 | 55.1 |
| Republican | Don Morrison | 11,787 | 44.9 |
| Total votes | | 26,251 | 100.0 |
| Democratic hold | | | |

=== District 12 ===
Iowa Senate, District 12 General Election, 1984
| Party | Candidate | Votes | % |
|---|---|---|---|
| Republican | Joy Corning | 13,813 | 50.6 |
| Democratic | Ted Anderson (incumbent) | 13,511 | 49.4 |
| Total votes | | 27,324 | 100.0 |
| Republican gain from Democratic | | | |

=== District 14 ===
Iowa Senate, District 14 Democratic Primary Election, 1984
| Party | Candidate | Votes | % |
|---|---|---|---|
| Democratic | Larry Murphy | 1,466 | 55.3 |
| Democratic | James V. Gallagher (incumbent) | 1,185 | 44.7 |
| Total votes | | 2,651 | 100.0 |

Iowa Senate, District 14 General Election, 1984
| Party | Candidate | Votes | % |
|---|---|---|---|
| Democratic | Larry Murphy | 12,851 | 54.5 |
| Republican | Karen Franks | 10,743 | 45.5 |
| Total votes | | 23,594 | 100.0 |
| Democratic hold | | | |

=== District 16 ===
Iowa Senate, District 16 General Election, 1984
| Party | Candidate | Votes | % |
|---|---|---|---|
| Republican | Dale L. Tieden (incumbent) | 15,508 | 100.0 |
| Total votes | | 15,508 | 100.0 |
| Republican hold | | | |

=== District 18 ===
Iowa Senate, District 18 General Election, 1984
| Party | Candidate | Votes | % |
|---|---|---|---|
| Democratic | Bob Carr (incumbent) | 15,701 | 100.0 |
| Total votes | | 15,701 | 100.0 |
| Democratic hold | | | |

=== District 20 ===
Iowa Senate, District 20 General Election, 1984
| Party | Candidate | Votes | % |
|---|---|---|---|
| Republican | Edgar Holden (incumbent) | 17,057 | 65.7 |
| Democratic | Walter L. Knapper | 8,912 | 34.3 |
| Total votes | | 25,969 | 100.0 |
| Republican hold | | | |

=== District 22 ===
Iowa Senate, District 22 General Election, 1984
| Party | Candidate | Votes | % |
|---|---|---|---|
| Democratic | Beverly Hannon | 12,802 | 50.7 |
| Republican | Merlin Hulse (incumbent) | 12,456 | 49.3 |
| Total votes | | 25,258 | 100.0 |
| Democratic gain from Republican | | | |

=== District 24 ===
Iowa Senate, District 24 Democratic Primary Election, 1984
| Party | Candidate | Votes | % |
|---|---|---|---|
| Democratic | Hurley Hall (incumbent) | 1,852 | 65.6 |
| Democratic | Tom Netcott | 970 | 34.4 |
| Total votes | | 2,822 | 100.0 |

Iowa Senate, District 24 General Election, 1984
| Party | Candidate | Votes | % |
|---|---|---|---|
| Democratic | Hurley Hall (incumbent) | 13,480 | 51.9 |
| Republican | George A. Lowe | 12,513 | 48.1 |
| Total votes | | 25,993 | 100.0 |
| Democratic hold | | | |

=== District 26 ===
Iowa Senate, District 26 General Election, 1984
| Party | Candidate | Votes | % |
|---|---|---|---|
| Democratic | James D. Wells (incumbent) | 16,400 | 60.9 |
| Republican | Kenneth D. Feeney | 10,528 | 39.1 |
| Total votes | | 26,928 | 100.0 |
| Democratic hold | | | |

=== District 28 ===
Iowa Senate, District 28 General Election, 1984
| Party | Candidate | Votes | % |
|---|---|---|---|
| Republican | Richard F. Drake (incumbent) | 14,440 | 100.0 |
| Total votes | | 14,440 | 100.0 |
| Republican hold | | | |

=== District 30 ===
Iowa Senate, District 30 General Election, 1984
| Party | Candidate | Votes | % |
|---|---|---|---|
| Democratic | Charles P. Miller (incumbent) | 13,411 | 55.4 |
| Republican | Ginny Burrus | 10,800 | 44.6 |
| Total votes | | 24,211 | 100.0 |
| Democratic hold | | | |

=== District 32 ===
Iowa Senate, District 32 General Election, 1984
| Party | Candidate | Votes | % |
|---|---|---|---|
| Republican | Forrest Schwengels (incumbent) | 14,492 | 59.7 |
| Democratic | Craig J. Downing | 9,788 | 40.3 |
| Total votes | | 24,280 | 100.0 |
| Republican hold | | | |

=== District 34 ===
Iowa Senate, District 34 Republican Primary Election, 1984
| Party | Candidate | Votes | % |
|---|---|---|---|
| Republican | Jerry G. Davis | 1,775 | 48.9 |
| Republican | J. Noel Vincent | 1,320 | 36.4 |
| Republican | Douglas R. Hawkins | 532 | 14.7 |
| Total votes | | 3,627 | 100.0 |

Iowa Senate, District 34 Democratic Primary Election, 1984
| Party | Candidate | Votes | % |
|---|---|---|---|
| Democratic | John A. Neighbour | indecipherable | indecipherable |
| Democratic | Michael D. Aubrey | indecipherable | indecipherable |
| Total votes | | indecipherable | 100.0 |

Iowa Senate, District 34 General Election, 1984
| Party | Candidate | Votes | % |
|---|---|---|---|
| Democratic | John A. Neighbour | 12,686 | 56.8 |
| Republican | Jerry G. Davis | 9,642 | 43.2 |
| Total votes | | 22,328 | 100.0 |
| Democratic hold | | | |

=== District 36 ===
Iowa Senate, District 36 General Election, 1984
| Party | Candidate | Votes | % |
|---|---|---|---|
| Republican | John Soorholtz (incumbent) | 14,772 | 56.6 |
| Democratic | Bert Permar | 11,331 | 43.4 |
| Total votes | | 26,103 | 100.0 |
| Republican hold | | | |

=== District 38 ===
Iowa Senate, District 38 General Election, 1984
| Party | Candidate | Votes | % |
|---|---|---|---|
| Democratic | Emil J. Husak (incumbent) | 12,757 | 100.0 |
| Total votes | | 12,757 | 100.0 |
| Democratic hold | | | |

=== District 40 ===
Iowa Senate, District 40 General Election, 1984
| Party | Candidate | Votes | % |
|---|---|---|---|
| Democratic | George Kinley (incumbent) | 15,418 | 69.3 |
| Republican | Virginia Lee Johnston | 6,840 | 30.7 |
| Total votes | | 22,258 | 100.0 |
| Democratic hold | | | |

=== District 42 ===
Iowa Senate, District 42 General Election, 1984
| Party | Candidate | Votes | % |
|---|---|---|---|
| Republican | David Readinger (incumbent) | 17,160 | 54.6 |
| Democratic | Joseph Z. Marks | 14,286 | 45.4 |
| Total votes | | 31,446 | 100.0 |
| Republican hold | | | |

=== District 44 ===
Iowa Senate, District 44 General Election, 1984
| Party | Candidate | Votes | % |
|---|---|---|---|
| Republican | Jack Nystrom (incumbent) | 13,318 | 50.6 |
| Democratic | Sam Garst | 12,978 | 49.4 |
| Total votes | | 26,296 | 100.0 |
| Republican hold | | | |

=== District 46 ===
Iowa Senate, District 46 Democratic Primary Election, 1984
| Party | Candidate | Votes | % |
|---|---|---|---|
| Democratic | Leonard Boswell | 2,258 | 60.6 |
| Democratic | Fred P. Diehl | 1,468 | 39.4 |
| Total votes | | 3,726 | 100.0 |

Iowa Senate, District 46 General Election, 1984
| Party | Candidate | Votes | % |
|---|---|---|---|
| Democratic | Leonard Boswell | 13,460 | 51.7 |
| Republican | L. W. Joe Gross | 12,557 | 48.3 |
| Total votes | | 26,017 | 100.0 |
| Democratic gain from Republican | | | |

=== District 48 ===
Iowa Senate, District 48 General Election, 1984
| Party | Candidate | Votes | % |
|---|---|---|---|
| Democratic | Bill Hutchins (incumbent) | 13,642 | 100.0 |
| Total votes | | 13,642 | 100.0 |
| Democratic hold | | | |

=== District 50 ===
Iowa Senate, District 50 General Election, 1984
| Party | Candidate | Votes | % |
|---|---|---|---|
| Democratic | Michael Gronstal | 11,030 | 54.8 |
| Republican | Carroll Jackson | 9,086 | 45.2 |
| Total votes | | 20,116 | 100.0 |
| Democratic hold | | | |

== See also ==
- United States elections, 1984
- United States House of Representatives elections in Iowa, 1984
- Elections in Iowa
