= 1980 Iowa Senate election =

- November 4, 1980

25 out of 50 seats in the Iowa State Senate 26 seats needed for a majority
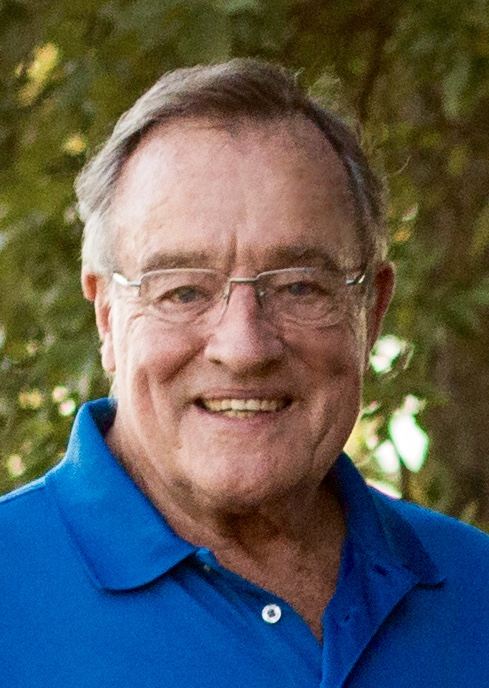

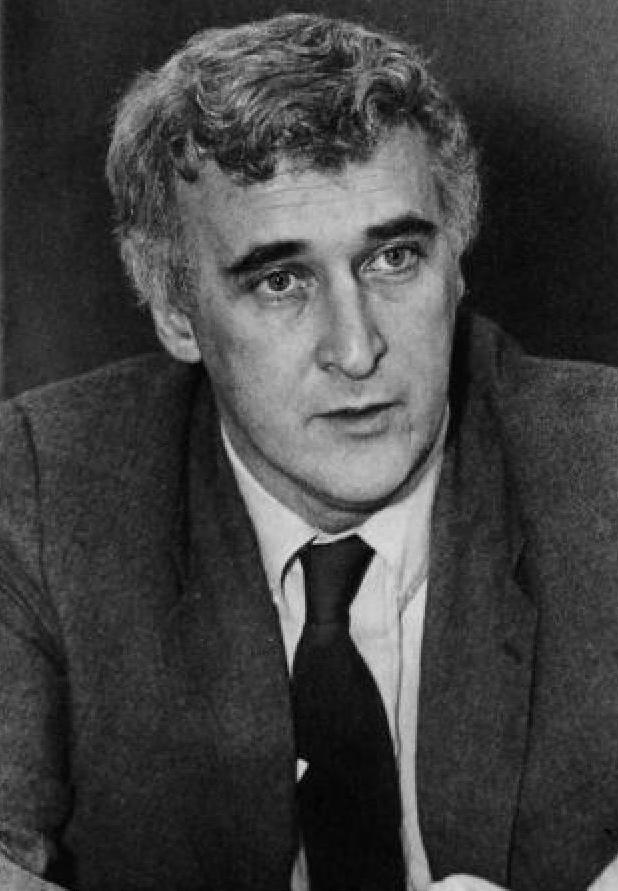
	Majority party	Minority party
Leader	Calvin Hultman	Lowell Junkins
Party	Republican	Democratic
Leader's seat	49th	43rd
Last election	28	22
Seats before	29 (Note: Democratic Senator Earl Willits resigned from his seat in district 31 in 1979. Republican Gary L. Baugher won a special election to fill the remainder of the term, thus gaining an additional seat for his party.)	21
Seats after	29	21
Seat change	Steady	Steady
Majority Leader before election
Calvin Hultman
Republican
Elected Majority Leader
Calvin Hultman
Republican

The 1980 Iowa State Senate elections took place as part of the biennial 1980 United States elections. Iowa voters elected state senators in half of the state senate's districts—the 25 even-numbered state senate districts. State senators serve four-year terms in the Iowa State Senate, with half of the seats up for election each cycle. A statewide map of the 50 state Senate districts in the year 1980 is provided by the Iowa General Assembly here.

The primary election on June 3, 1980, determined which candidates appeared on the November 4, 1980 general election ballot. Primary election results can be obtained here. General election results can be obtained here.

Following the previous elections in 1978, Republicans had control of the Iowa state Senate with 28 seats to Democrats' 22 seats. In 1979, Democratic Senator Earl Willits resigned and Republican Gary Baugher won a special election to fill the seat, thereby increasing Republicans' seats to 29.

To take control of the chamber from Republicans, the Democrats needed to net 5 Senate seats.

Republicans maintained their control of the Iowa State Senate following the 1980 general election with the balance of power remaining unchanged with Republicans holding 29 seats and Democrats having 21 seats after the election.

== Summary of Results ==
- NOTE: The 25 odd-numbered districts did not have elections in 1980 so they are not listed here.

State Senate District	Incumbent	Party	Elected Senator	Party
2nd	Irvin L. Bergman	Rep	Richard Vande Hoef	Republican
4th	Berl Priebe	Dem	Berl Priebe	Democratic
6th	Alvin V. Miller	Dem	Alvin V. Miller	Democratic
8th	Rolf V. Craft	Rep	Rolf V. Craft	Republican
10th	Robert M. "Bob" Carr	Dem	Robert M. "Bob" Carr	Democratic
12th	Merlin Hulse	Rep	Merlin Hulse	Republican
14th	Cloyd E. Robinson	Dem	James D. Wells	Democratic
16th	James V. Gallagher	Dem	James V. Gallagher	Democratic
18th	Bill Hansen	Rep	Ted J. Anderson	Democratic
20th	Elizabeth Ruby Miller	Rep	Michael R. Lura	Republican
22nd	Jack Nystrom	Rep	Jack Nystrom	Republican
24th	John R. Scott	Dem	Elvie C. Dreeszen	Republican
26th	James Calhoon	Dem	Donald V. Doyle	Democratic
28th	Charles W. Hutchins	Dem	Charles W. Hutchins	Democratic
30th	David Readinger	Rep	David Readinger	Republican
32nd	William D. Palmer	Dem	William D. Palmer	Democratic
34th	George Kinley	Dem	George Kinley	Democratic
36th	Joann Yessler Orr	Dem	Emil J. Husak	Democratic
38th	Richard F. Drake	Rep	Richard F. Drake	Republican
40th	Edgar Holden	Rep	Edgar Holden	Republican
42nd	Charles Peter Miller	Dem	Charles Peter Miller	Democratic
44th	Forrest Schwengels	Rep	Forrest Schwengels	Republican
46th	Bass Van Gilst	Dem	Bass Van Gilst	Democratic
48th	James E. Briles	Rep	James E. Briles	Republican
50th	Tom L. Slater	Dem	Tom L. Slater	Democratic

== Detailed Results ==
- Reminder: Only even-numbered Iowa Senate seats were up for election in 1980; therefore, odd-numbered seats did not have elections in 1980 & are not shown.
- Note: If a district does not list a primary, then that district did not have a competitive primary (i.e., there may have only been one candidate file for that district).

=== District 2 ===
Iowa Senate, District 2 Republican Primary Election, 1980
Party	Candidate	Votes	%
Republican	Richard Vande Hoef	3,134	54.7
Republican	Leon Triggs	2,598	45.3
Total votes		5,732	100.0

Iowa Senate, District 2 General Election, 1980
Party	Candidate	Votes	%
Republican	Richard Vande Hoef	13,912	59.1
Democratic	John E. van der Linden	9,612	40.9
Total votes		23,524	100.0
Republican hold			

=== District 4 ===
Iowa Senate, District 4 General Election, 1980
Party	Candidate	Votes	%
Democratic	Berl Priebe (incumbent)	15,459	100.0
Total votes		15,459	100.0
Democratic hold			

=== District 6 ===
Iowa Senate, District 6 General Election, 1980
Party	Candidate	Votes	%
Democratic	Alvin V. Miller (incumbent)	13,467	54.5
Republican	Patrick J. Breheny	11,218	45.5
Total votes		24,685	100.0
Democratic hold			

=== District 8 ===
Iowa Senate, District 8 General Election, 1980
Party	Candidate	Votes	%
Republican	Rolf V. Craft (incumbent)	15,254	100.0
Total votes		15,254	100.0
Republican hold			

=== District 10 ===
Iowa Senate, District 10 General Election, 1980
Party	Candidate	Votes	%
Democratic	Bob Carr (incumbent)	12,588	54.9
Republican	John M. Walsh	10,359	45.1
Total votes		22,947	100.0
Democratic hold			

=== District 12 ===
Iowa Senate, District 12 General Election, 1980
Party	Candidate	Votes	%
Republican	Merlin Hulse (incumbent)	13,407	62.0
Democratic	Michael L. Richards	8,217	38.0
Total votes		21,624	100.0
Republican hold			

=== District 14 ===
Iowa Senate, District 14 General Election, 1980
Party	Candidate	Votes	%
Democratic	James D. Wells	14,215	94.3
Libertarian	Rich Newell	867	5.7
Total votes		15,082	100.0
Democratic hold			

=== District 16 ===
Iowa Senate, District 16 General Election, 1980
Party	Candidate	Votes	%
Democratic	James V. Gallagher (incumbent)	12,782	56.9
Republican	Maurice Stoneman	9,669	43.1
Total votes		22,451	100.0
Democratic hold			

=== District 18 ===
Iowa Senate, District 18 Republican Primary Election, 1980
Party	Candidate	Votes	%
Republican	Jerry E. Jorgensen	3,653	69.6
Republican	Gordon B. Denton	1,595	30.4
Total votes		5,248	100.0

Iowa Senate, District 18 General Election, 1980
Party	Candidate	Votes	%
Democratic	Ted Anderson	13,356	51.1
Republican	Jerry E. Jorgensen	12,801	48.9
Total votes		26,157	100.0
Democratic gain from Republican			

=== District 20 ===
Iowa Senate, District 20 Republican Primary Election, 1980
Party	Candidate	Votes	%
Republican	Mick Lura	4,016	51.7
Republican	Virtus Brockman	3,752	48.3
Total votes		7,768	100.0

Iowa Senate, District 20 General Election, 1980
Party	Candidate	Votes	%
Republican	Mick Lura	13,296	54.6
Democratic	Ralph Howe	11,049	45.4
Total votes		24,345	100.0
Republican hold			

=== District 22 ===
Iowa Senate, District 22 Democratic Primary Election, 1980
Party	Candidate	Votes	%
Democratic	Doris Van Sickle	881	53.1
Democratic	Robert E. Eide	778	46.9
Total votes		1,659	100.0

Iowa Senate, District 22 General Election, 1980
Party	Candidate	Votes	%
Republican	Jack Nystrom (incumbent)	15,168	61.5
Democratic	Doris Van Sickle	9,482	38.5
Total votes		24,650	100.0
Republican hold			

=== District 24 ===
Iowa Senate, District 24 General Election, 1980
Party	Candidate	Votes	%
Republican	Elvie Dreeszen	11,813	57.6
Democratic	Howard Heisterkamp	8,221	40.1
Libertarian	Frank Hanisch	481	2.3
Total votes		20,515	100.0
Republican gain from Democratic			

=== District 26 ===
Iowa Senate, District 26 Republican Primary Election, 1980
Party	Candidate	Votes	%
Republican	Leonard C. Andersen	1,534	51.2
Republican	William W. Douglass, Jr.	1,462	48.8
Total votes		2,996	100.0

Iowa Senate, District 26 General Election, 1980
Party	Candidate	Votes	%
Democratic	Donald V. Doyle	10,803	53.0
Republican	Leonard C. Andersen	9,575	47.0
Total votes		20,378	100.0
Democratic hold			

=== District 28 ===
Iowa Senate, District 28 General Election, 1980
Party	Candidate	Votes	%
Democratic	Bill Hutchins (incumbent)	12,449	55.8
Republican	George Opperman	9,848	44.2
Total votes		22,297	100.0
Democratic hold			

=== District 30 ===
Iowa Senate, District 30 General Election, 1980
Party	Candidate	Votes	%
Republican	David Readinger (incumbent)	17,024	56.5
Democratic	Robert J. Marks	13,092	43.5
Total votes		30,116	100.0
Republican hold			

=== District 32 ===
Iowa Senate, District 32 General Election, 1980
Party	Candidate	Votes	%
Democratic	William D. Palmer (incumbent)	15,228	68.8
Republican	Ray C. Stiles	6,890	31.2
Total votes		22,118	100.0
Democratic hold			

=== District 34 ===
Iowa Senate, District 34 General Election, 1980
Party	Candidate	Votes	%
Democratic	George Kinley (incumbent)	14,927	67.9
Republican	Gary E. Cozad	6,807	31.0
Independent	Tex Allen	259	1.1
Total votes		21,993	100.0
Democratic hold			

=== District 36 ===
Iowa Senate, District 36 Republican Primary Election, 1980
Party	Candidate	Votes	%
Republican	Bruce Ostrom	1,527	29.7
Republican	Charles V. Dunham	1,445	28.1
Republican	Dean L. Morse	1,228	23.9
Republican	C. Eugene Long	946	18.3
Total votes		5,146	100.0

Iowa Senate, District 36 General Election, 1980
Party	Candidate	Votes	%
Democratic	Emil J. Husak	11,475	51.8
Republican	Charles V. Dunham	10,671	48.2
Total votes		22,146	100.0
Democratic hold			

=== District 38 ===
Iowa Senate, District 38 General Election, 1980
Party	Candidate	Votes	%
Republican	Richard F. Drake (incumbent)	13,837	60.9
Democratic	Tom Tucker	8,887	39.1
Total votes		22,724	100.0
Republican hold			

=== District 40 ===
Iowa Senate, District 40 General Election, 1980
Party	Candidate	Votes	%
Republican	Edgar H. Holden (incumbent)	16,157	55.8
Democratic	Mary Johnson	12,777	44.2
Total votes		28,934	100.0
Republican hold			

=== District 42 ===
Iowa Senate, District 42 General Election, 1980
Party	Candidate	Votes	%
Democratic	Charles P. Miller (incumbent)	12,631	56.8
Republican	Ralph L. Caston, III	9,589	43.2
Total votes		22,220	100.0
Democratic hold			

=== District 44 ===
Iowa Senate, District 44 Democratic Primary Election, 1980
Party	Candidate	Votes	%
Democratic	R.W. Gustafson	1,157	64.2
Democratic	Cynthia Hesseltine	644	35.8
Total votes		1,801	100.0

Iowa Senate, District 44 General Election, 1980
Party	Candidate	Votes	%
Republican	Forrest Schwengels (incumbent)	14,690	67.0
Democratic	R.W. Gustafson	7,224	33.0
Total votes		21,914	100.0
Republican hold			

=== District 46 ===
Iowa Senate, District 46 General Election, 1980
Party	Candidate	Votes	%
Democratic	Bass Van Gilst (incumbent)	12,384	52.0
Republican	James M. Bellamy	11,443	48.0
Total votes		23,827	100.0
Democratic hold			

=== District 48 ===
Iowa Senate, District 48 General Election, 1980
Party	Candidate	Votes	%
Republican	James E. Briles (incumbent)	12,590	52.9
Democratic	Dave Schweers	11,189	47.1
Total votes		23,779	100.0
Republican hold			

=== District 50 ===
Iowa Senate, District 50 General Election, 1980
Party	Candidate	Votes	%
Democratic	Tom Slater (incumbent)	8,664	50.5
Republican	Jim Griffin	8,503	49.5
Total votes		17,167	100.0
Democratic hold			

== See also ==
- United States elections, 1980
- United States House of Representatives elections in Iowa, 1980
- Elections in Iowa
