= 1988 Iowa Senate election =

- November 8, 1988

25 out of 50 seats in the Iowa State Senate 26 seats needed for a majority
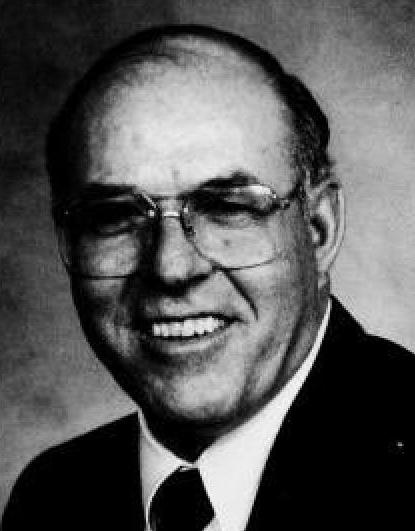

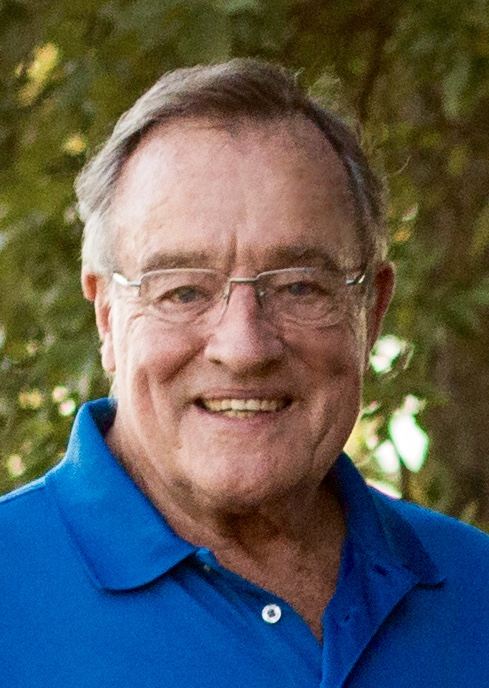
	Majority party	Minority party
Leader	Bill Hutchins	Calvin Hultman
Party	Democratic	Republican
Leader's seat	48th	47th
Last election	30	20
Seats before	30	20
Seats after	30	20
Seat change	Steady	Steady
Majority Leader before election
Bill Hutchins
Democratic
Elected Majority Leader
Bill Hutchins
Democratic

The 1988 Iowa State Senate elections took place as part of the biennial 1988 United States elections. Iowans elected state senators in even-numbered state senate districts.

State senators serve four-year terms in the Iowa State Senate with half of the seats up for election each cycle.

The primary on June 7, 1988 determined which candidates to the general election. Primary election results can be obtained here. General election results can be obtained here.

== Summary of results ==
State Senate District	Incumbent	Party	Elected Senator	Party
2nd	Donald V. Doyle	Dem	Donald V. Doyle	Democratic
4th	Richard Vande Hoef	Rep	Richard Vande Hoef	Republican
6th	Lee Warren Holt	Rep	Jack Kibbie	Democratic
8th	Berl Priebe	Dem	Berl Priebe	Democratic
10th	Alvin V. Miller	Dem	Alvin V. Miller	Democratic
12th	Joy Corning	Rep	Joy Corning	Republican
14th	Larry Murphy	Dem	Larry Murphy	Democratic
16th	Dale L. Tieden	Rep	Dale L. Tieden	Republican
18th	Robert M. Carr	Dem	Robert M. Carr	Democratic
20th	Edgar Holden	Rep	Maggie Tinsman	Republican
22nd	Beverly Hannon	Dem	Beverly Hannon	Democratic
24th	Hurley Hall (Note: Sen. Hall switched parties from Democratic to Republican and ran against Sen. Hannon in District 22 in the 1988 general election.)	Dem	Paul Pate	Republican
26th	James D. Wells	Dem	Richard Running	Democratic
28th	Richard F. Drake	Rep	Richard F. Drake	Republican
30th	Charles Peter Miller	Dem	Mark R. Hagerla	Republican
32nd	Forrest Schwengels	Rep	H. Kay Hedge	Republican
34th	John A. Peterson	Dem	John A. Peterson	Democratic
36th	John E. Soorholtz	Rep	John E. Soorholtz	Republican
38th	Emil J. Husak	Dem	Emil J. Husak	Democratic
40th	George Kinley	Dem	George Kinley	Democratic
42nd	David Readinger	Rep	Elaine Szymoniak	Democratic
44th	Jack Nystrom	Rep	Jack Nystrom	Republican
46th	Leonard Boswell	Dem	Leonard Boswell	Democratic
48th	Charles W. Hutchins	Dem	Charles W. Hutchins	Democratic
50th	Michael Gronstal	Dem	Michael Gronstal	Democratic

== Detailed results ==
=== District 2 ===
Iowa Senate, District 2 Republican Primary Election, 1988
Party	Candidate	Votes	%
Republican	Dick Hallowell	1,061	56.1
Republican	Lewis E. Heifner	830	43.9
Total votes		1,891	100.0

Iowa Senate, District 2 General Election, 1988
Party	Candidate	Votes	%
Democratic	Donald V. Doyle (incumbent)	12,806	58.6
Republican	Dick Hallowell	9,057	41.4
Total votes		21,863	100.0
Democratic hold			

=== District 4 ===
Iowa Senate, District 4 Democratic Primary Election, 1988
Party	Candidate	Votes	%
Democratic	Dennis D. Tangeman	724	56.4
Democratic	Glenn P. Wehrkamp	559	43.6
Total votes		1,283	100.0

Iowa Senate, District 4 General Election, 1988
Party	Candidate	Votes	%
Republican	Richard Vande Hoef (incumbent)	14,924	69.0
Democratic	Dennis D. Tangeman	6,717	31.0
Total votes		21,641	100.0
Republican hold			

=== District 6 ===
Iowa Senate, District 6 Republican Primary Election, 1988
Party	Candidate	Votes	%
Republican	George P. Moriarty	2,723	71.2
Republican	Earl D. Squeeg Chapman	1,099	28.8
Total votes		3,822	100.0

Iowa Senate, District 6 General Election, 1988
Party	Candidate	Votes	%
Democratic	Jack Kibbie	12,820	55.6
Republican	George P. Moriarty	10,236	44.4
Total votes		23,056	100.0
Democratic gain from Republican			

=== District 8 ===
Iowa Senate, District 8 Democratic Primary Election, 1988
Party	Candidate	Votes	%
Democratic	Berl Priebe (incumbent)	1,914	75.5
Democratic	Jack Niewald	621	24.5
Total votes		2,535	100.0

Iowa Senate, District 8 General Election, 1988
Party	Candidate	Votes	%
Democratic	Berl Priebe (incumbent)	15,804	68.7
Republican	David J. Hanson	7,187	31.3
Total votes		22,991	100.0
Democratic hold			

=== District 10 ===
Iowa Senate, District 10 Republican Primary Election, 1988
Party	Candidate	Votes	%
Republican	Jack Knapp	2,535	65.5
Republican	Craig A. Ouverson	1,335	34.5
Total votes		3,870	100.0

Iowa Senate, District 10 General Election, 1988
Party	Candidate	Votes	%
Democratic	Alvin V. Miller (incumbent)	13,341	52.4
Republican	Jack Knapp	12,128	47.6
Total votes		25,469	100.0
Democratic hold			

=== District 12 ===
Iowa Senate, District 12 General Election, 1988
Party	Candidate	Votes	%
Republican	Joy Corning (incumbent)	12,346	52.8
Democratic	Rose Angel	11,042	47.2
Total votes		23,388	100.0
Republican hold			

=== District 14 ===
Iowa Senate, District 14 General Election, 1988
Party	Candidate	Votes	%
Democratic	Larry Murphy (incumbent)	14,272	100.0
Total votes		14,272	100.0
Democratic hold			

=== District 16 ===
Iowa Senate, District 16 General Election, 1988
Party	Candidate	Votes	%
Republican	Dale L. Tieden (incumbent)	12,911	61.0
Democratic	Phil Specht	8,240	39.0
Total votes		21,151	100.0
Republican hold			

=== District 18 ===
Iowa Senate, District 18 General Election, 1988
Party	Candidate	Votes	%
Democratic	Bob Carr (incumbent)	14,734	100.0
Total votes		14,734	100.0
Democratic hold			

=== District 20 ===
Iowa Senate, District 20 Republican Primary Election, 1988
Party	Candidate	Votes	%
Republican	Maggie Tinsman	2,829	57.0
Republican	Edgar Holden (incumbent)	2,131	43.0
Total votes		4,960	100.0

Iowa Senate, District 20 General Election, 1988
Party	Candidate	Votes	%
Republican	Maggie Tinsman	19,505	76.1
Democratic	Gary P. Genazzio	6,124	23.9
Total votes		25,629	100.0
Republican hold			

=== District 22 ===
Iowa Senate, District 22 Democratic Primary Election, 1988
Party	Candidate	Votes	%
Democratic	Beverly Hannon (incumbent)	1,934	85.5
Democratic	Katherine "Kitty" Ortgies	327	14.5
Total votes		2,261	100.0

Iowa Senate, District 22 General Election, 1988
Party	Candidate	Votes	%
Democratic	Beverly Hannon (incumbent)	12,978	54.3
Republican	Hurley Hall (incumbent)	10,939	45.7
Total votes		23,917	100.0
Democratic hold			

=== District 24 ===
Iowa Senate, District 24 Republican Primary Election, 1988
Party	Candidate	Votes	%
Republican	Paul Pate	1,167	59.1
Republican	Chris Keleher	808	40.9
Total votes		1,975	100.0

Iowa Senate, District 24 Democratic Primary Election, 1988
Party	Candidate	Votes	%
Democratic	Ralph J. Kremer	986	49.3
Democratic	Myron B. Oxley	700	35.0
Democratic	Raymond E. Franklin	314	15.7
Total votes		2,000	100.0

Iowa Senate, District 24 General Election, 1988
Party	Candidate	Votes	%
Republican	Paul Pate	12,640	51.3
Democratic	Ralph J. Kremer	11,980	48.7
Total votes		24,620	100.0
Republican gain from Democratic			

=== District 26 ===
Iowa Senate, District 26 General Election, 1988
Party	Candidate	Votes	%
Democratic	Richard V. Running	15,300	58.6
Republican	Evan R. Hughes	10,824	41.4
Total votes		26,124	100.0
Democratic hold			

=== District 28 ===
Iowa Senate, District 28 General Election, 1988
Party	Candidate	Votes	%
Republican	Richard F. Drake (incumbent)	12,805	100.0
Total votes		12,805	100.0
Republican hold			

=== District 30 ===
Iowa Senate, District 30 Republican Primary Election, 1988
Party	Candidate	Votes	%
Republican	Mark R. Hagerla	2,310	59.9
Republican	William R. Ruther	1,547	40.1
Total votes		3,857	100.0

Iowa Senate, District 30 Democratic Primary Election, 1988
Party	Candidate	Votes	%
Democratic	Clyde L. Norrgard	2,091	51.7
Democratic	Robert E. Summers	1,950	48.3
Total votes		4,041	100.0

Iowa Senate, District 30 General Election, 1988
Party	Candidate	Votes	%
Republican	Mark R. Hagerla	12,497	52.7
Democratic	Clyde L. Norrgard	11,214	47.3
Total votes		23,711	100.0
Republican gain from Democratic			

=== District 32 ===
Iowa Senate, District 32 Republican Primary Election, 1988
Party	Candidate	Votes	%
Republican	H. Kay Hedge	2,788	78.1
Republican	Raymond T. Plowman	784	21.9
Total votes		3,572	100.0

Iowa Senate, District 32 Democratic Primary Election, 1988
Party	Candidate	Votes	%
Democratic	Craig Downing	1,387	77.7
Democratic	Larry Heimstra	399	22.3
Total votes		1,786	100.0

Iowa Senate, District 32 General Election, 1988
Party	Candidate	Votes	%
Republican	H. Kay Hedge	13,343	57.4
Democratic	Craig Downing	9,885	42.6
Total votes		23,228	100.0
Republican hold			

=== District 34 ===
Iowa Senate, District 34 Democratic Primary Election, 1988
Party	Candidate	Votes	%
Democratic	John A. Peterson (incumbent)	1,821	55.7
Democratic	Ruth Hardin	1,446	44.3
Total votes		3,267	100.0

Iowa Senate, District 34 General Election, 1988
Party	Candidate	Votes	%
Democratic	John A. Peterson (incumbent)	13,729	58.2
Republican	John C. Rhodes	9,875	41.8
Total votes		23,604	100.0
Democratic hold			

=== District 36 ===
Iowa Senate, District 36 General Election, 1988
Party	Candidate	Votes	%
Republican	John E. Soorholtz (incumbent)	13,169	53.9
Democratic	Bert Permar	11,283	46.1
Total votes		24,452	100.0
Republican hold			

=== District 38 ===
Iowa Senate, District 38 Republican Primary Election, 1988
Party	Candidate	Votes	%
Republican	Burtwin L. Day	1,149	57.4
Republican	Galen Delfs	853	42.6
Total votes		2,002	100.0

Iowa Senate, District 38 General Election, 1988
Party	Candidate	Votes	%
Democratic	Emil J. Husak (incumbent)	13,978	60.8
Republican	Burtwin L. Day	8,995	39.2
Total votes		22,973	100.0
Democratic hold			

=== District 40 ===
Iowa Senate, District 40 General Election, 1988
Party	Candidate	Votes	%
Democratic	George Kinley (incumbent)	16,712	74.8
Republican	Virginia Johnston	5,636	25.2
Total votes		22,348	100.0
Democratic hold			

=== District 42 ===
Iowa Senate, District 42 Republican Primary Election, 1988
Party	Candidate	Votes	%
Republican	David Readinger (incumbent)	1,030	53.1
Republican	Gene Maddox	909	46.9
Total votes		1,939	100.0

Iowa Senate, District 42 General Election, 1988
Party	Candidate	Votes	%
Democratic	Elaine Szymoniak	17,310	51.8
Republican	David Readinger (incumbent)	16,088	48.2
Total votes		33,398	100.0
Democratic gain from Republican			

=== District 44 ===
Iowa Senate, District 44 Democratic Primary Election, 1988
Party	Candidate	Votes	%
Democratic	Steven G. Lingren	2,166	66.8
Democratic	Greg W. Steensland	1,075	33.2
Total votes		3,241	100.0

Iowa Senate, District 44 General Election, 1988
Party	Candidate	Votes	%
Republican	Jack Nystrom (incumbent)	12,804	53.5
Democratic	Steven G. Lingren	11,148	46.5
Total votes		23,952	100.0
Republican hold			

=== District 46 ===
Iowa Senate, District 46 General Election, 1988
Party	Candidate	Votes	%
Democratic	Leonard Boswell (incumbent)	15,215	64.7
Republican	Gene Smith	8,296	35.3
Total votes		23,511	100.0
Democratic hold			

=== District 48 ===
Iowa Senate, District 48 General Election, 1988
Party	Candidate	Votes	%
Democratic	Bill Hutchins (incumbent)	13,810	70.4
Republican	Jim Rosman-Bakehouse	5,807	29.6
Total votes		19,617	100.0
Democratic hold			

=== District 50 ===
Iowa Senate, District 50 General Election, 1988
Party	Candidate	Votes	%
Democratic	Michael Gronstal (incumbent)	11,200	58.9
Republican	Arminda S. Hartman	7,807	41.1
Total votes		19,007	100.0
Democratic hold			

== See also ==
- United States elections, 1988
- United States House of Representatives elections in Iowa, 1988
- Elections in Iowa
