= 1976 Iowa Senate election =

State senate election in 1976, Iowa

- November 2, 1976

28 out of 50 seats in the Iowa State Senate 26 seats needed for a majority
	Majority party	Minority party
Leader	George Kinley	Clifton C. Lamborn
Party	Democratic	Republican
Leader's seat	34th	12th (retired)
Last election	26	24
Seats before	26	24
Seats after	26	24
Seat change	Steady	Steady
Majority Leader before election
George Kinley
Democratic
Elected Majority Leader
George Kinley
Democratic

The 1976 Iowa State Senate elections took place as part of the biennial 1976 United States elections. Iowa voters elected state senators in 28 of the state senate's districts—the 25 even-numbered state senate districts and special elections in districts 11, 15, and 41. State senators serve four-year terms in the Iowa State Senate, with half of the seats up for election each cycle. A statewide map of the 50 state Senate districts in 1976 is provided by the Iowa General Assembly here.

The primary election on June 8, 1976 determined which candidates appeared on the November 2, 1976 general election ballot. Primary election results can be obtained here. General election results can be obtained here.

To take control of the chamber from Democrats, the Republicans needed to net two Senate seats.

Democrats maintained their control of the Iowa State Senate following the 1976 elections, with the balance of power remaining unchanged, with Democrats holding 26 seats and Republicans having 24 seats after the election.

== Summary of results ==
- Note: Districts not having elections in 1976 are unlisted.

State senate district	incumbent	Party	Elected senator	Party
2nd	Irvin L. Bergman	Rep	Irvin L. Bergman	Republican
4th	Berl Priebe	Dem	Berl Priebe	Democratic
6th	Kenneth Daniel Scott	Dem	Alvin V. Miller	Democratic
8th	Hilarius Louis Heying	Dem	Rolf V. Craft	Republican
10th	Robert M. "Bob" Carr	Dem	Robert M. "Bob" Carr	Democratic
11th (Note: Special election on December 28, 1976.)	Richard John Norpel	Dem	Stephen W. Bisenius	Republican
12th	Clifton C. Lamborn	Rep	Merlin Hulse	Republican
14th	Cloyd E. Robinson	Dem	Cloyd E. Robinson	Democratic
15th (Note: Special election on November 2, 1976.)	Steve Sovern	Dem	Robert "Bob" Rush	Democratic
16th	James V. Gallagher	Dem	James V. Gallagher	Democratic
18th	Bill Hansen	Rep	Bill Hansen	Republican
20th	Elizabeth Ruby Miller	Rep	Elizabeth Ruby Miller	Republican
22nd	Jack Nystrom	Rep	Jack Nystrom	Republican
24th	William P. Winkelman	Rep	John R. Scott	Democratic
26th	Leonard C. Andersen	Rep	James Calhoon	Democratic
28th	Karl Nolin	Dem	Charles W. Hutchins	Democratic
30th	William N. Plymat	Rep	David Readinger	Republican
32nd	William D. Palmer	Dem	William D. Palmer	Democratic
34th	George Kinley	Dem	George Kinley	Democratic
36th	Joann Yessler Orr	Dem	Joann Yessler Orr	Democratic
38th	William R. Rabedeaux	Rep	Richard F. Drake	Republican
40th	Elizabeth Orr Shaw	Rep	Elizabeth Orr Shaw	Republican
41st (Note: Special election on December 28, 1976.)	Bill Gluba	Dem	Forrest F. Ashcraft	Republican
42nd	Charles Peter Miller	Dem	Charles Peter Miller	Democratic
44th	Forrest Schwengels	Rep	Forrest Schwengels	Republican
46th	Bass Van Gilst	Dem	Bass Van Gilst	Democratic
48th	James E. Briles	Rep	James E. Briles	Republican
50th	James W. Griffin	Rep	Tom L. Slater	Democratic

== Detailed results ==
- Reminder: All even-numbered Iowa Senate seats were up for election in 1976, as well as three odd-numbered districts (11, 15, & 41). All other odd-numbered districts did not have elections.
- Note: If a district does not list a primary, then that district did not have a competitive primary (i.e., there may have only been one candidate file for that district).

=== District 2 ===
Iowa Senate, District 2 general election, 1976
Party	Candidate	Votes	%
Republican	Irvin L. Bergman (incumbent)	14,409	100.0
Total votes		14,409	100.0
Republican hold			

=== District 4 ===
Iowa Senate, District 4 general election, 1976
Party	Candidate	Votes	%
Democratic	Berl Priebe (incumbent)	17,077	100.0
Total votes		17,077	100.0
Democratic hold			

=== District 6 ===
Iowa Senate, District 6 Republican primary election, 1976
Party	Candidate	Votes	%
Republican	Bruce B. Girton	2,470	62.7
Republican	Pat Breheny	1,472	37.3
Total votes		3,942	100.0

Iowa Senate, District 6 general election, 1976
Party	Candidate	Votes	%
Democratic	Alvin V. Miller	12,976	52.1
Republican	Bruce B. Girton	11,936	47.9
Total votes		24,912	100.0
Democratic hold			

=== District 8 ===
Iowa Senate, District 8 general election, 1976
Party	Candidate	Votes	%
Republican	Rolf V. Craft	12,916	56.7
Democratic	Richard R. Nelson	9,877	43.3
Total votes		22,793	100.0
Republican gain from Democratic			

=== District 10 ===
Iowa Senate, District 10 general election, 1976
Party	Candidate	Votes	%
Democratic	Bob Carr (incumbent)	14,308	62.6
Republican	Marian B. Pfaff	8,545	37.4
Total votes		22,853	100.0
Democratic hold			

=== District 11 ===
Iowa Senate, District 11 special election, December 28, 1976
Party	Candidate	Votes	%
Republican	Steve Bisenius	3,925	50.8
Democratic	Maurice Hennessey	3,800	49.2
Total votes		7,725	100.0
Republican gain from Democratic			

=== District 12 ===
Iowa Senate, District 12 general election, 1976
Party	Candidate	Votes	%
Republican	Merlin Hulse	12,503	54.3
Democratic	Paul Ponder	10,528	45.7
Total votes		23,031	100.0
Republican hold			

=== District 14 ===
Iowa Senate, District 14 general election, 1976
Party	Candidate	Votes	%
Democratic	Cloyd E. Robinson (incumbent)	14,757	65.7
Republican	Sandra L. Pink	7,366	32.7
Independent	Garry W. McCune	350	1.6
Total votes		22,473	100.0
Democratic hold			

=== District 15 ===
Iowa Senate, District 15 special election, November 2, 1976
Party	Candidate	Votes	%
Democratic	Bob Rush	13,777	59.8
Republican	Andrew Gordon Holmes	9,254	40.2
Total votes		23,031	100.0
Democratic hold			

=== District 16 ===
Iowa Senate, District 16 Democratic primary election, 1976
Party	Candidate	Votes	%
Democratic	James Gallagher (incumbent)	1,786	80.7
Democratic	Steven Karr	426	19.3
Total votes		2,212	100.0

Iowa Senate, District 16 general election, 1976
Party	Candidate	Votes	%
Democratic	James Gallagher (incumbent)	13,631	60.0
Republican	Kyle Hummel	9,074	40.0
Total votes		22,705	100.0
Democratic hold			

=== District 18 ===
Iowa Senate, District 18 general election, 1976
Party	Candidate	Votes	%
Republican	Willard R. "Bill" Hansen (incumbent)	13,265	52.0
Democratic	Ted Anderson	12,081	47.3
Independent	Gerald Baker	188	0.7
Total votes		25,534	100.0
Republican hold			

=== District 20 ===
Iowa Senate, District 20 general election, 1976
Party	Candidate	Votes	%
Republican	Elizabeth Ruby Miller (incumbent)	12,317	50.5
Democratic	Larry A. Raymon	12,085	49.5
Total votes		24,402	100.0
Republican hold			

=== District 22 ===
Iowa Senate, District 22 Democratic primary election, 1976
Party	Candidate	Votes	%
Democratic	Jim R. Riordan	1,242	59.9
Democratic	D. Tom Peterson	677	32.7
Democratic	Steven R. Oakland	154	7.4
Total votes		2,073	100.0

Iowa Senate, District 22 general election, 1976
Party	Candidate	Votes	%
Republican	John N. "Jack" Nystrom (incumbent)	13,636	54.7
Democratic	Jim R. Riordan	11,314	45.3
Total votes		24,950	100.0
Republican hold			

=== District 24 ===
Iowa Senate, District 24 general election, 1976
Party	Candidate	Votes	%
Democratic	John Scott	12,886	53.9
Republican	William P. Winkelman (incumbent)	11,040	46.1
Total votes		23,926	100.0
Democratic gain from Republican			

=== District 26 ===
Iowa Senate, District 26 general election, 1976
Party	Candidate	Votes	%
Democratic	James Calhoon	10,397	50.1
Republican	Leonard C. Andersen (incumbent)	10,374	49.9
Total votes		20,771	100.0
Democratic gain from Republican			

=== District 28 ===
Iowa Senate, District 28 general election, 1976
Party	Candidate	Votes	%
Democratic	Charles W. "Bill" Hutchins	12,431	55.2
Republican	William R. Ferguson	10,079	44.8
Total votes		22,510	100.0
Democratic hold			

=== District 30 ===
Iowa Senate, District 30 Republican primary election, 1976
Party	Candidate	Votes	%
Republican	David Readinger	2,017	58.1
Republican	William N. Plymat (incumbent)	1,456	41.9
Total votes		3,473	100.0

Iowa Senate, District 30 Democratic primary election, 1976
Party	Candidate	Votes	%
Democratic	Ed Campbell	1,828	52.4
Democratic	Michael E. Hansen	1,661	47.6
Total votes		3,489	100.0

Iowa Senate, District 30 general election, 1976
Party	Candidate	Votes	%
Republican	David Readinger	15,545	52.3
Democratic	Ed Campbell	14,206	47.7
Total votes		29,751	100.0
Republican hold			

=== District 32 ===
Iowa Senate, District 32 general election, 1976
Party	Candidate	Votes	%
Democratic	William D. Palmer (incumbent)	16,512	75.7
Republican	William F. Horstman	5,310	24.3
Total votes		21,822	100.0
Democratic hold			

=== District 34 ===
Iowa Senate, District 34 general election, 1976
Party	Candidate	Votes	%
Democratic	George Kinley (incumbent)	15,199	72.6
Republican	Kappie Spencer	5,744	27.4
Total votes		20,943	100.0
Democratic hold			

=== District 36 ===
Iowa Senate, District 36 Republican primary election, 1976
Party	Candidate	Votes	%
Republican	Judith Dierenfeld	1,048	50.4
Republican	Chas. V. Dunham	1,031	49.6
Total votes		2,079	100.0

Iowa Senate, District 36 general election, 1976
Party	Candidate	Votes	%
Democratic	Joan Orr (incumbent)	14,454	61.9
Republican	Judith Dierenfeld	8,890	38.1
Total votes		23,344	100.0
Democratic hold			

=== District 38 ===
Iowa Senate, District 38 general election, 1976
Party	Candidate	Votes	%
Republican	Richard F. Drake	12,481	55.5
Democratic	Jim Paulding	9,996	44.5
Total votes		22,477	100.0
Republican hold			

=== District 40 ===
Iowa Senate, District 40 general election, 1976
Party	Candidate	Votes	%
Republican	Elizabeth Orr Shaw (incumbent)	18,142	62.2
Democratic	Steven F. Altheimer	11,047	37.8
Total votes		29,189	100.0
Republican hold			

=== District 41 ===
Iowa Senate, District 41 special election, December 28, 1976
Party	Candidate	Votes	%
Republican	Forrest F. Ashcraft	3,028	61.6
Democratic	Michael McDonald	1,886	38.4
Total votes		4,914	100.0
Republican gain from Democratic			

=== District 42 ===
Iowa Senate, District 42 general election, 1976
Party	Candidate	Votes	%
Democratic	Charles P. Miller (incumbent)	13,267	58.4
Republican	Charles R. Fulbruge	9,436	41.6
Total votes		22,703	100.0
Democratic hold			

=== District 44 ===
Iowa Senate, District 44 general election, 1976
Party	Candidate	Votes	%
Republican	Forrest Schwengels (incumbent)	15,044	100.0
Total votes		15,044	100.0
Republican hold			

=== District 46 ===
Iowa Senate, District 46 general election, 1976
Party	Candidate	Votes	%
Democratic	Bass Van Gilst (incumbent)	15,257	66.3
Republican	Lou Fusco	7,748	33.7
Total votes		23,005	100.0
Democratic hold			

=== District 48 ===
Iowa Senate, District 48 Republican primary election, 1976
Party	Candidate	Votes	%
Republican	James E. Briles (incumbent)	4,771	68.6
Republican	Margaret L. Hemphill	2,182	31.4
Total votes		6,953	100.0

Iowa Senate, District 48 Democratic primary election, 1976
Party	Candidate	Votes	%
Democratic	Forrest C. Teig	925	60.8
Democratic	Joseph Sullivan	596	39.2
Total votes		1,521	100.0

Iowa Senate, District 48 general election, 1976
Party	Candidate	Votes	%
Republican	James E. Briles (incumbent)	14,372	59.6
Democratic	Forrest C. Teig	9,739	40.4
Total votes		24,111	100.0
Republican hold			

=== District 50 ===
Iowa Senate, District 50 general election, 1976
Party	Candidate	Votes	%
Democratic	Tom Slater	9,962	54.8
Republican	Jim Griffin (incumbent)	8,216	45.2
Total votes		18,178	100.0
Democratic gain from Republican			

== See also ==
- United States elections, 1976
- United States House of Representatives elections in Iowa, 1976
- Elections in Iowa
