= Albert Sorensen =

American politician (1932–2026)

Member of the Iowa Senate from the 40th district 44th (1991–1993)
- In office 1991 – January 13, 1997
- Preceded by: Jack Nystrom
- Succeeded by: Jerry Behn

Personal details
- Born: February 19, 1932 Norwalk, Iowa, U.S.
- Died: July 25, 2026 (aged 94) Boone, Iowa, U.S.
- Party: Democrat
- Spouse: JoAnn

Albert Sorensen (February 19, 1932 – July 25, 2026) was an American politician who served as a Democratic Iowa State Senator from 1991 to 1997. He joined the Senate after winning a special election in 1991, his predecessor, Jack Nystrom (R-Boone), having resigned to serve on the Iowa Liquor Commission. He won re-election in 1992, but lost in 1996 to Republican Jerry Behn.

During his second term in the Senate, Sorensen served on several committees in the Iowa Senate - the Agriculture committee; the Natural Resources, Environment and Energy committee; the Small Business, Economic Development & Tourism committee; the State Government committee; and the Local Government committee, where he was the chair.

Sorensen was elected to the Boone County Board of Supervisors in 2000 and re-elected in 2004. He was nominated to be the Democratic candidate for the 24th Senate District, challenging Republican incumbent Jerry Behn in the 2008 general election.

Sorensen died in Boone, Iowa, on July 25, 2026, at the age of 94.

Iowa Senate
Preceded by George Kinley	40th District; 1993–1997	Succeeded by Jerry Behn
Preceded by Jack Nystrom	44th District; 1991–1993	Succeeded by Leonard Boswell
