= Senator Slater (disambiguation) =

James H. Slater (1826–1899) was a U.S. Senator from Oregon from 1879 to 1885. Senator Slater may also refer to:

- Fred J. Slater (1885–1943), New York State Senate
- George A. Slater (1867–1937), New York State Senate
- Samuel S. Slater (1870–1916), New York State Senate
- Tom Slater (politician) (1945–2018), Iowa State Senate
