= Jesse Green =

Jesse Green may refer to:

- Jesse Green (jazz musician) (born 1971), American jazz pianist, composer, arranger, and record producer
- Jesse Green (reggae musician) (born 1948), Jamaican ska and disco musician
- Jesse Green (theater critic), American journalist and theater critic
- Jesse Green (politician), member of the Iowa Senate

== See also ==
- Jessie Green, American football wide receiver
- Jessy Greene, American violinist, cellist and vocalist
