= Elvie Dreeszen =

American politician (1920–1986)

Member of the Iowa Senate from the 24th district
- In office January 12, 1981 – January 9, 1983
- Preceded by: John R. Scott
- Succeeded by: Hurley Hall

Personal details
- Born: August 7, 1920 Douglas Township, Ida County, Iowa
- Died: December 6, 1986 (aged 66) Ida Grove, Iowa
- Party: Republican

Elvie Dreeszen (August 7, 1920 – December 6, 1986) was an American politician who served in the Iowa Senate from the 24th district from 1981 to 1983.

He died on December 6, 1986, in Ida Grove, Iowa at age 66.
