= John R. Scott (Iowa politician) =

American lawyer and politician (born 1944)

John R. Scott (born March 2, 1944) is an American lawyer and politician from Iowa.

John R. Scott was born on March 2, 1944, in Pocahontas, Iowa, the son of parents Lloyd and Lucille. Scott graduated from the Pocahontas Catholic High School before attending the University of Iowa, earning his Bachelor's of Arts degree in political science in 1962, followed by a Juris Doctor from the Iowa College of Law in 1969. The following year, Scott began working as a prosecutor for the Department of Justice. He left the DOJ after winning the 1976 Iowa Senate election, and served one term in the Iowa Senate, representing District 24 from January 10, 1977, to January 11, 1981, as a Democrat.
