= Iowa's 40th Senate district =

American legislative district

Senate District 40
- Type: District of the Upper House
- Location: Southeastern Iowa
- Senator: Art Staed (D)
- Parent organization: Iowa General Assembly

The 40th District of the Iowa Senate is located in eastern Iowa, and is currently composed of part of Linn County.

== Current elected officials ==
Ken Rozenboom is the senator currently representing the 40th District.

The area of the 40th District contains two Iowa House of Representatives districts:

- The 79th District (represented by Dustin Hite)
- The 80th District (represented by Holly Brink)

The district is also located in Iowa's 2nd congressional district, which is represented by Mariannette Miller-Meeks.

== Past senators ==
The district has previously been represented by:

- Adolph Elvers, 1965–1966
- Robert Rigler, 1967–1970
- James W. Griffin, 1971–1972
- Elizabeth Orr Shaw, 1973–1977
- Edgar Holden, 1978–1982
- George Kinley, 1983–1992
- Albert Sorensen, 1993–1996
- Jerry Behn, 1997–2002
- Richard F. Drake, 2003–2004
- James F. Hahn, 2005–2012
- Ken Rozenboom, 2013–present

== See also ==
- Iowa General Assembly
- Iowa Senate
