= Jerry Behn =

American politician (born 1954)

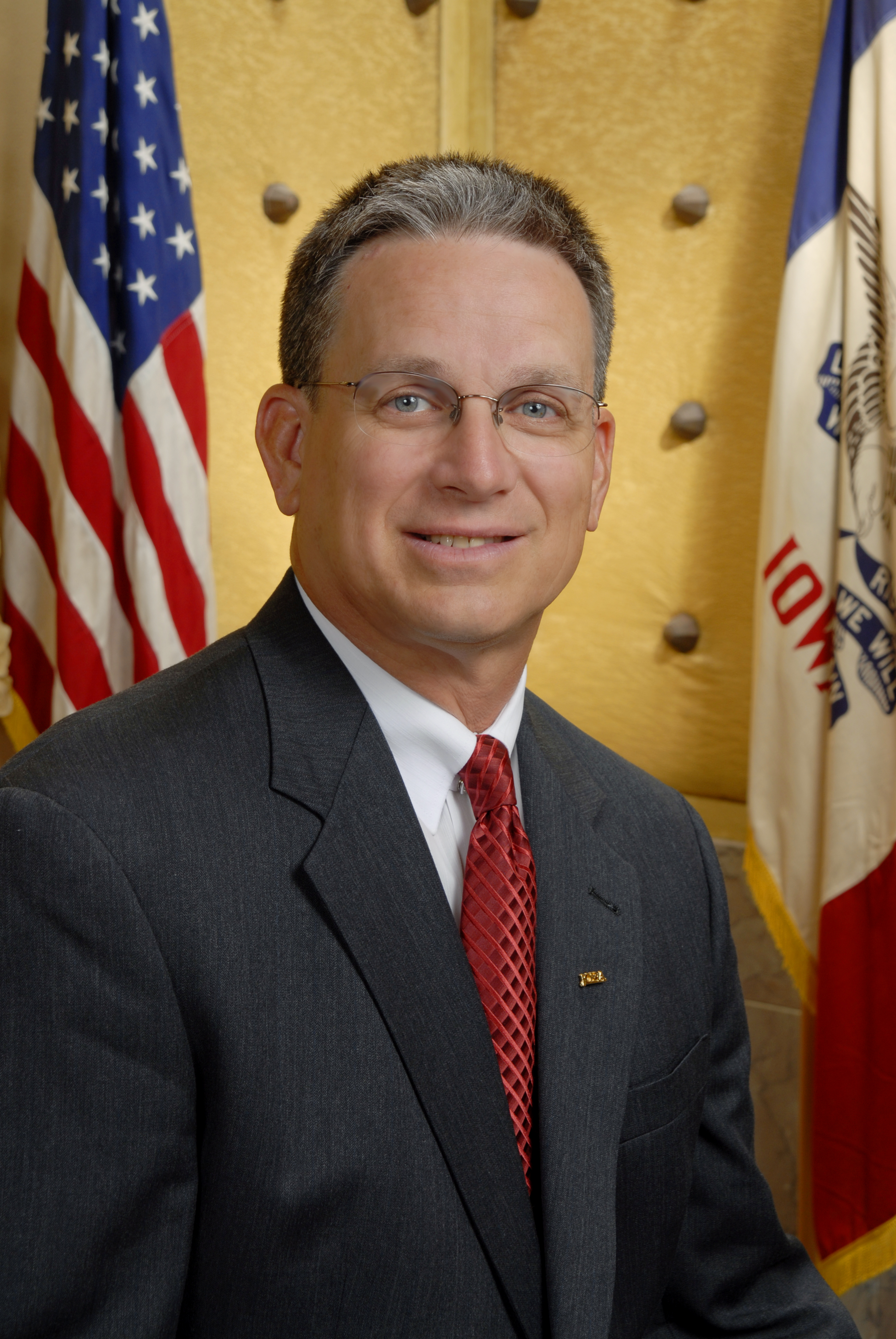

President pro tempore of the Iowa Senate
- In office January 9, 2017 – January 11, 2021
- Preceded by: Steve Sodders
- Succeeded by: Brad Zaun

Member of the Iowa Senate
- In office January 13, 1997 – January 11, 2021
- Preceded by: Albert Sorensen
- Succeeded by: Jesse Green
- Constituency: 40th district (1997–2003); 24th district (2003–2021)

Personal details
- Born: January 31, 1954 (age 72) Ames, Iowa, U.S.
- Party: Republican
- Spouse: Dennise
- Children: 4 (including Chad)

Jerry Behn (born January 31, 1954) is an American politician who served as a member of the Iowa Senate for the 24th district from 1997 to 2021.

== Career ==
Behn served as a Boone County supervisor from 1995 to 1996.

Behn served on the Senate Appropriations committee; the Senate Commerce committee; the Senate State Government committee; the Senate Environment & Energy Independence committee, and the Senate Ethics committee. He also served on the Senate Administration and Regulation Appropriations Subcommittee.

Behn was last re-elected in 2008 with 22,970 votes (57%), defeating Democratic opponent, former Iowa Senator Albert Sorensen.

Behn was a candidate for the 2010 Iowa gubernatorial election but withdrew, endorsing Terry Branstad.

Behn is a supporter of capital punishment, he has introduced a limited death penalty bill in each General Assembly since 1997. his latest attempt was in 2019.

Iowa Senate
Preceded by Albert Sorensen	Member of the Iowa Senate from the 40th district 1997–2003	Succeeded by Richard Drake
Preceded by Richard Drake	Member of the Iowa Senate from the 24th district 2003–present	Incumbent
Preceded by Steve Sodders	President pro tempore of the Iowa Senate; 2018–2021	Succeeded by Brad Zaun
