= Rolf Craft =

American politician (1937–2009)

Member of the Iowa Senate from the 8th district
- In office January 10, 1977 – January 10, 1983
- Preceded by: Hilarius Heying
- Succeeded by: Berl Priebe

Personal details
- Born: November 1, 1937 Waterloo, Iowa, U.S.
- Died: January 9, 2009 (aged 71) Rochester, Minnesota, U.S.
- Party: Republican

Rolf Craft (November 1, 1937 – January 9, 2009) was an American politician who served in the Iowa Senate from the 8th district from 1977 to 1983.

He died of melanoma on January 9, 2009, in Rochester, Minnesota, at age 71.
