= Kara Warme =

American politician

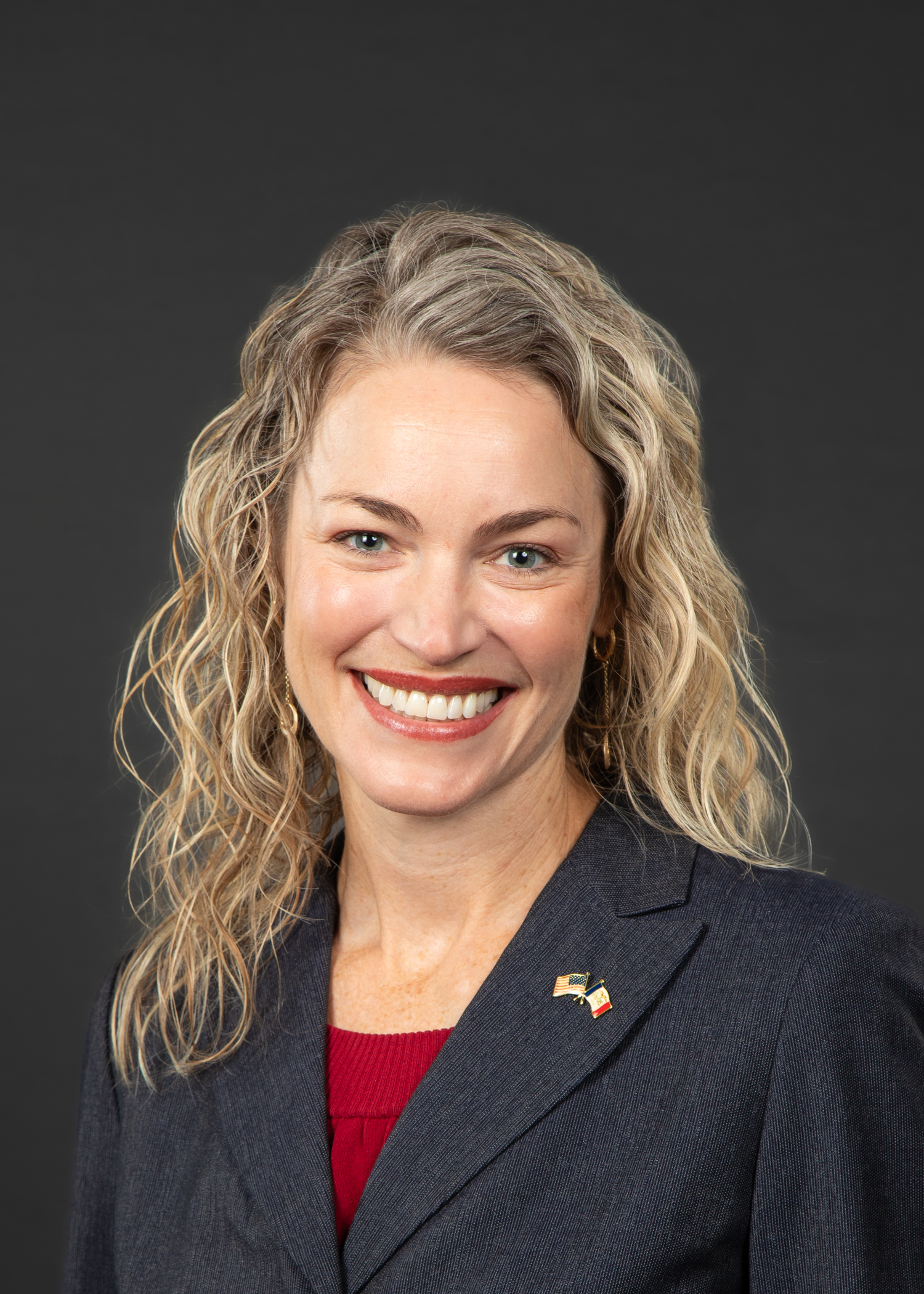

Member of the Iowa Senate from the 26th district
- Incumbent
- Assumed office January 2, 2025
- Preceded by: Jeff Edler

Personal details
- Born: 1979 (age 46–47) San Diego, California
- Party: Republican
- Education: Stanford University (BS); University of Iowa (MBA)
- Website: www.warmeforiowa.com

Kara Warme is an American politician. She was elected to the Iowa Senate in the 2024 Iowa Senate election.

Warme has worked as a farmer and a substitute teacher.
