= Leonard Boswell =

American politician (1934–2018)

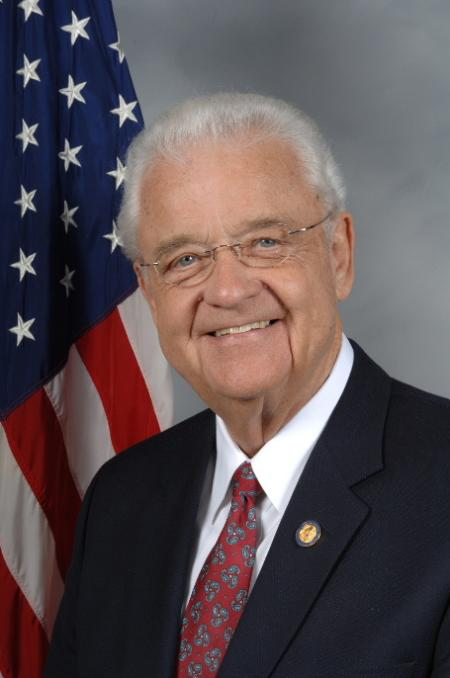

Member of the U.S. House of Representatives from Iowa's 3rd district
- In office January 3, 1997 – January 3, 2013
- Preceded by: Jim Lightfoot
- Succeeded by: Tom Latham

President of the Iowa Senate
- In office January 11, 1993 – January 3, 1997
- Preceded by: Michael Gronstal
- Succeeded by: Mary Kramer

Member of the Iowa Senate
- In office 1985–1997

Personal details
- Born: Leonard Leroy Boswell; January 10, 1934 Harrison County, Missouri, U.S.
- Died: August 17, 2018 (aged 84) Des Moines, Iowa, U.S.
- Party: Democratic
- Spouse: Dody Boswell (m. 1955)
- Children: 4
- Education: Graceland College
- Profession: Farmer
- Awards: Distinguished Flying Cross (2); Bronze Star (2); Soldier's Medal

Military service
- Branch/service: United States Army
- Years of service: 1956-1976
- Rank: Lieutenant Colonel
- Battles/wars: Vietnam War

Leonard Leroy Boswell (January 10, 1934 – August 17, 2018) was an American politician who served as the U.S. representative for Iowa's 3rd congressional district from 1997 to 2013, a district based in Des Moines. A member of the Democratic Party, he was defeated for reelection in 2012 by 4th district incumbent Tom Latham, who decided to run against him after redistricting. Boswell left Congress in January 2013.

== Early life, education and career ==
Boswell was born in Harrison County, Missouri, the son of Margaret and Melvin Boswell. He was raised on a farm and educated at Graceland University in Lamoni, Iowa.

Boswell spent twenty years in the United States Army. He was drafted into the Army in 1956 as a private. He later graduated from Artillery Officers Candidate School, eventually reaching the rank of lieutenant colonel. During his military career, he earned two Distinguished Flying Crosses, two Bronze Stars, the Soldier's Medal, and other awards and decorations. He served two one-year tours of duty as an assault helicopter pilot in Vietnam. He also served two NATO tours of duty in Europe, first for four years in Germany, and later three years in Portugal. He taught at the Army Command and General Staff College.

== Early political career ==
Boswell was elected to the Iowa Senate in 1984 and served three terms in that body. In 1986, he ran for the United States House of Representatives, but was narrowly defeated by Scott Hughes of Council Bluffs in the Democratic primary. He was President of the Iowa Senate from 1993 to 1996. He was the Democratic nominee for Lieutenant Governor of Iowa in 1994, as Bonnie Campbell's running mate.

== U.S. House of Representatives ==
=== Committee assignments ===
- Committee on Agriculture
  - Subcommittee on General Farm Commodities and Risk Management (Ranking Member)
  - Subcommittee on Livestock, Dairy, and Poultry
- Committee on Transportation and Infrastructure
  - Subcommittee on Highways and Transit

=== Issues ===
In the 111th Congress, Boswell voted with Democratic leadership more often than 131 members, or 49%, of the Democratic Caucus.

==== Taxes ====
In a debate in 2012, Boswell said that he opposes an extension of the Bush tax cuts and supports tax increases for those with high incomes. Boswell criticized his opponent for signing a pledge not to raise taxes. Boswell said, "If you look at this trickle-down theory, I don't see where that's been a historical success."

==== Health care ====
Boswell supported the Affordable Care Act. In a 2012 debate, Boswell defended his vote in favor of the Affordable Care Act. He said, "Obamacare … is actually working. I think the people out across Iowa as they talk to me about it, the parts of it that have really been important to them, they're appreciative of."

Boswell authored H.R. 327, the Joshua Omvig Veterans Suicide Prevention Act, which was signed into law in 2007 and provides mental health services and support for veterans.

Boswell voted to expand funding for the State Children's Health Insurance Program (SCHIP) and voted twice to override the President's veto of SCHIP legislation. cap and trade legislation for carbon emissions, and h

==== Education ====
Boswell has voted to double Pell Grants and supported the 2007 College Cost Reduction and Access Act, providing the largest increase in college aid since the GI bill. He voted for the No Child Left Behind Act in 2001.

==== Foreign policy ====
On October 10, 2002, Boswell voted in favor of authorizing the invasion of Iraq.

==== National security ====
In 2001 Boswell voted for the USA PATRIOT Act, and for its reauthorization in 2005.

In 2008 he supported passing the FISA bill granting telecommunications companies immunity from prosecution for their involvement in warrantless wiretapping of American citizens. He sent a letter to Speaker Pelosi encouraging her not to fight the bill. He voted for the final House version of the bill once he was convinced it provided adequate protection for telecom companies.

==== Gun rights ====
Boswell, a strong proponent of gun rights in a state that supports the issue, wrote an op-ed in the local Council Bluffs newspaper criticizing Mitt Romney for flip-flopping on the issue of gun rights, an issue supported by local Iowans.

During Boswell's 2010 re-election campaign, his views on gun rights and armed self-defense earned him an "A" rating from the NRA Political Victory Fund, which endorsed him over his (also "A"-rated) Republican rival.

==== Subsidies and stimulus spending ====
He has supported the Emergency Economic Stabilization Act of 2008 and the 2009 stimulus bill. The Iowa Independent reported that the conservative group Crossroads GPS criticized Boswell's vote approving the American Recovery and Reinvestment Act of 2009. The group, ran by Steven J. Law with ties to Karl Rove, had purchased $85,125 worth of TV time at KCCI, Des Moines local CBS channel targeting Boswell. Six weeks later, Crossroads GPS invested another $150,000 to the campaign. The money will be used to create and air two commercials.

== Political campaigns ==
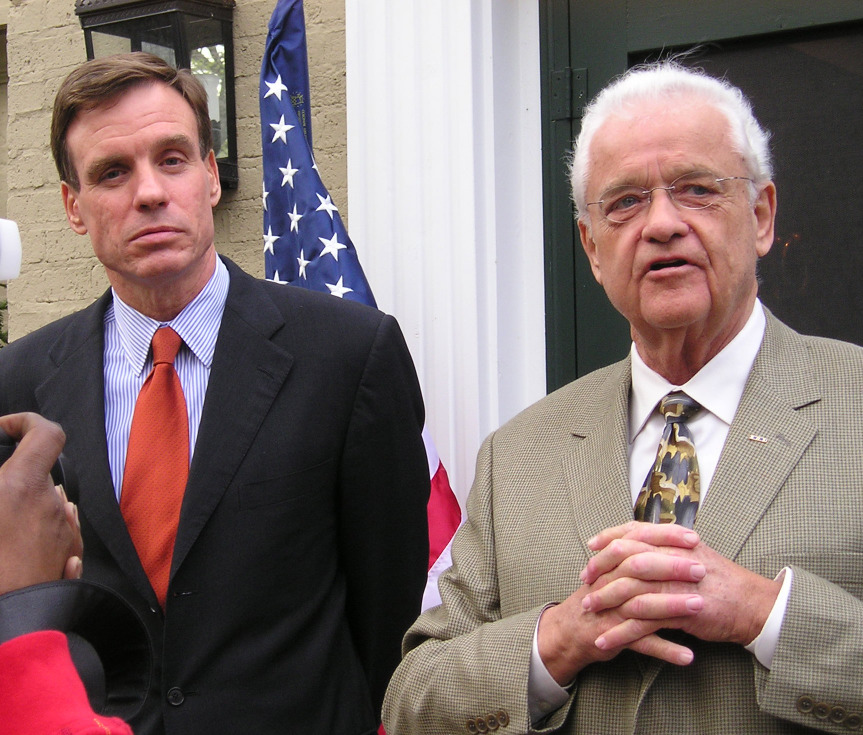
Boswell with Virginia Governor Mark Warner, 2006

Boswell won the Democratic nomination for the 3rd District after 12-year Republican incumbent Jim Ross Lightfoot made an unsuccessful run for the United States Senate. He defeated Poweshiek County Attorney Mike Mahaffey by just over 4,000 votes. He was likely helped by Bill Clinton carrying the district, as well as the endorsement of the normally Republican-leaning Iowa Farm Bureau. He was handily reelected in 1998 and 2000. During his 2nd term, Boswell pledged to serve no more than 8 years. By 2004 he had reversed that pledge, stating that "A thinking person is allowed to change their mind."

For his first three terms, Boswell represented a sprawling district that stretched from the Illinois border almost to the Nebraska border. However, his district was dismantled in the 2000s round of redistricting (even though Iowa didn't lose any seats), and its territory was split among three other districts. Boswell's home was shifted to the heavily Republican 5th District. Rather than face almost certain defeat, Boswell moved to Des Moines in the newly created 3rd District—thus making him technically the successor to Greg Ganske, who represented a Des Moines-based district from 1995 to 2003 and ran unsuccessfully for the U.S. Senate in 2002.

Boswell had a non-cancerous tumor removed from his stomach in 2005. The surgery and resulting recovery period caused him to be the most-absent member of Congress for the year. Rumors circulated that Democrats were looking to replace him on the ballot for 2006's Congressional race against Iowa GOP Senate leader Jeff Lamberti, but Boswell's return to work and apparent good health put an end to the speculation. He was reelected to his 7th term on November 4, 2008.

After the 2010 census, Boswell's district was significantly redrawn. It now extended across the southwestern part of the state from Des Moines to Council Bluffs. He faced 4th District congressman Tom Latham in the 2012 election; Latham had been drawn into the same district as fellow Republican Steve King and opted to move to the 3rd. Talking about his re-election campaign, Boswell quipped, "I'm running against Tom Latham, I think I'm running against Boehner, and there's this guy called Karl Rove." Politico described the race between Boswell and Tom Latham, both incumbents faced off against each other as a result of redistricting, as one of ten bellwether races. At the end of the first quarter of 2012, Boswell trailed Latham substantially in both fundraising and cash on hand. Latham won the race, 52.4% to 43.7%.

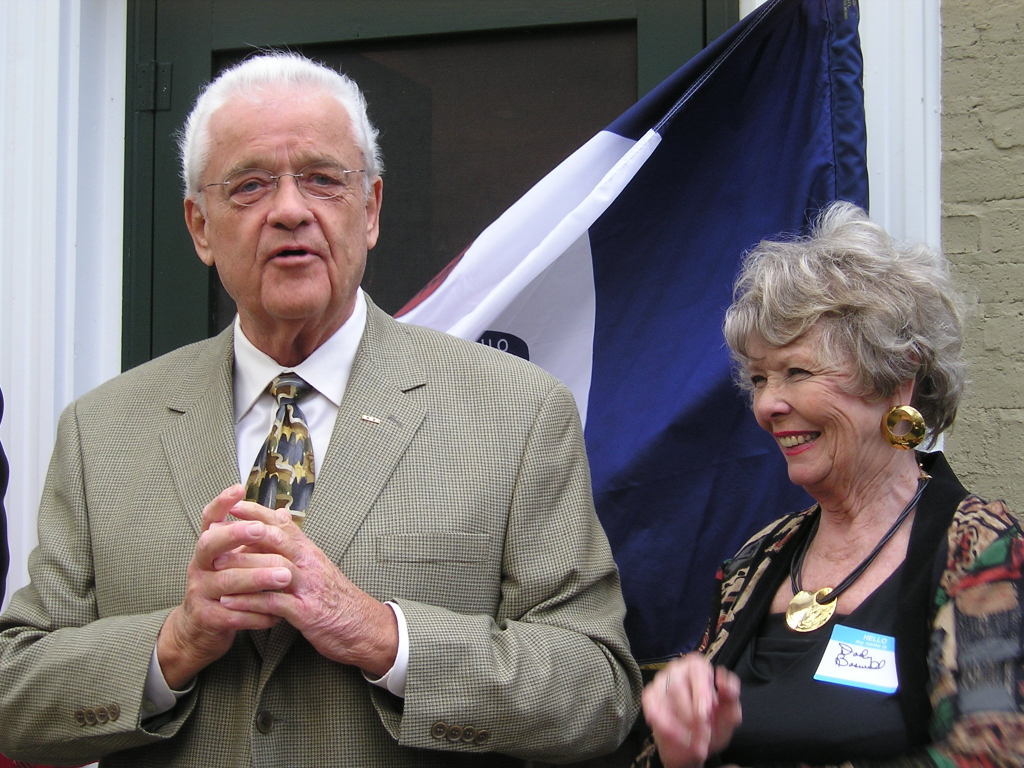
Boswell and his wife Dody, 2006

== Personal life ==
Boswell was a member of the Community of Christ. He has been married to Dody Boswell since 1956; they have three children. He also had another daughter from previous marriage. Boswell operated a farm in Davis City that has been in his family for several generations. He was a member of the board of directors for the Decatur County farmer's cooperative from 1979 to 1993, serving for most of that time as president.

In July 2011, Boswell and his family were the victims of a home invasion. At about 10:45 p.m. on July 16, an armed man came through the front door of Boswell's Iowa farmhouse, attacked his daughter, Cindy Brown, and demanded money. The Congressman struggled with the man until his grandson, Mitchell Brown, aimed a shotgun at the intruder, at which point the intruder fled the house into the surrounding fields.

Boswell died in Des Moines, Iowa on August 17, 2018, after suffering from complications of pseudomyxoma peritonei, a rare form of cancer, for over 13 years. His wife, Dody, died eight days later on August 25, 2018, the day of his funeral. Her family said she died after suffering from a "prolonged illness". Both were interred at Rose Hill Cemetery, in Lamoni, Iowa.

Iowa Senate
| Preceded by James E. Briles | Member of the Iowa Senate from the 46th district 1985–1993 | Succeeded by Patty Judge |
| Preceded by Albert Sorensen | Member of the Iowa Senate from the 44th district 1993–1997 | Succeeded by Jeff Angelo |
Party political offices
| Preceded by Jo Ann Zimmerman | Democratic nominee for Lieutenant Governor of Iowa; 1994 | Succeeded by Sally Pederson |
U.S. House of Representatives
| Preceded by Jim R. Lightfoot | Member of the U.S. House of Representatives from Iowa's 3rd congressional district 1997–2013 | Succeeded by Tom Latham |
