= Jesse Green (politician) =

American politician

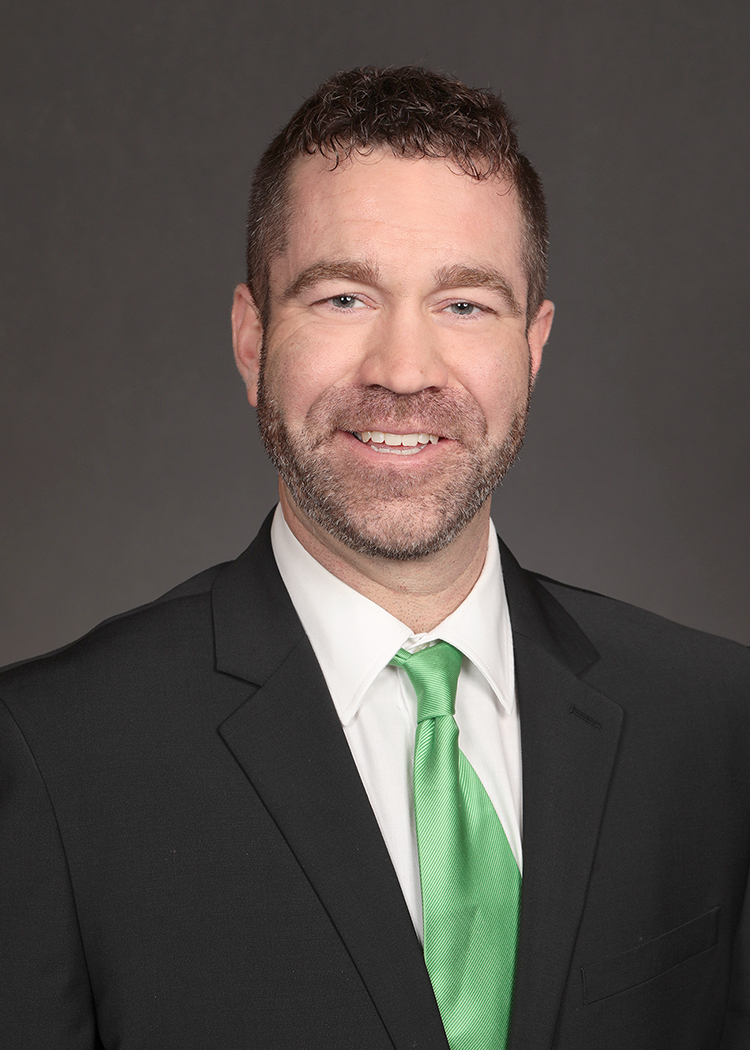

Member of the Iowa Senate from the 24th district
- Incumbent
- Assumed office January 11, 2021
- Preceded by: Jerry Behn

Personal details
- Born: Harcourt, Iowa, U.S.
- Party: Republican

Jesse Green is an American politician serving as a member of the Iowa Senate from the 24th district. Elected in November 2020, he assumed office on January 11, 2021.

== Early life ==
Green was born and raised in Harcourt, Iowa. He attended Community Christian School in Fort Dodge, Iowa and graduated high school from Southeast Webster. Green worked on his family's farm after high school and later took courses at Emmaus Bible College and Iowa Central Community College.

== Career ==
Prior to entering politics, Green worked on his family farm and through community service with the Dayton Rodeo and as a Bible teacher. On the family farm they raise corn, beans, oats, hay, and rodeo livestock. He was elected to the Iowa Senate in November 2020 and assumed office on January 11, 2021. He has served in the Senate as Vice Chair of Labor and most recently as Chairman of Local Government along with other committee assignments.

Iowa Senate
Preceded by Jerry Behn	24th District; 2021 – present	Succeeded by Incumbent
