= Elizabeth Ruby Miller =

American politician

Elizabeth Ruby Miller (née Shank) (August 24, 1905 – December 31, 1988) was an American housewife and politician.

Born in Marshalltown, Iowa, Miller graduated from Marshalltown High School. She married John Bascom Miller in 1923 and was a housewife. From 1969 to 1973, Miller served in the Iowa House of Representatives and was a Republican. Then Miller served in the Iowa State Senate from 1971 to 1979. Miller died of a heart attack at her home in Marshalltown, Iowa.
