= John Soorholtz =

American politician

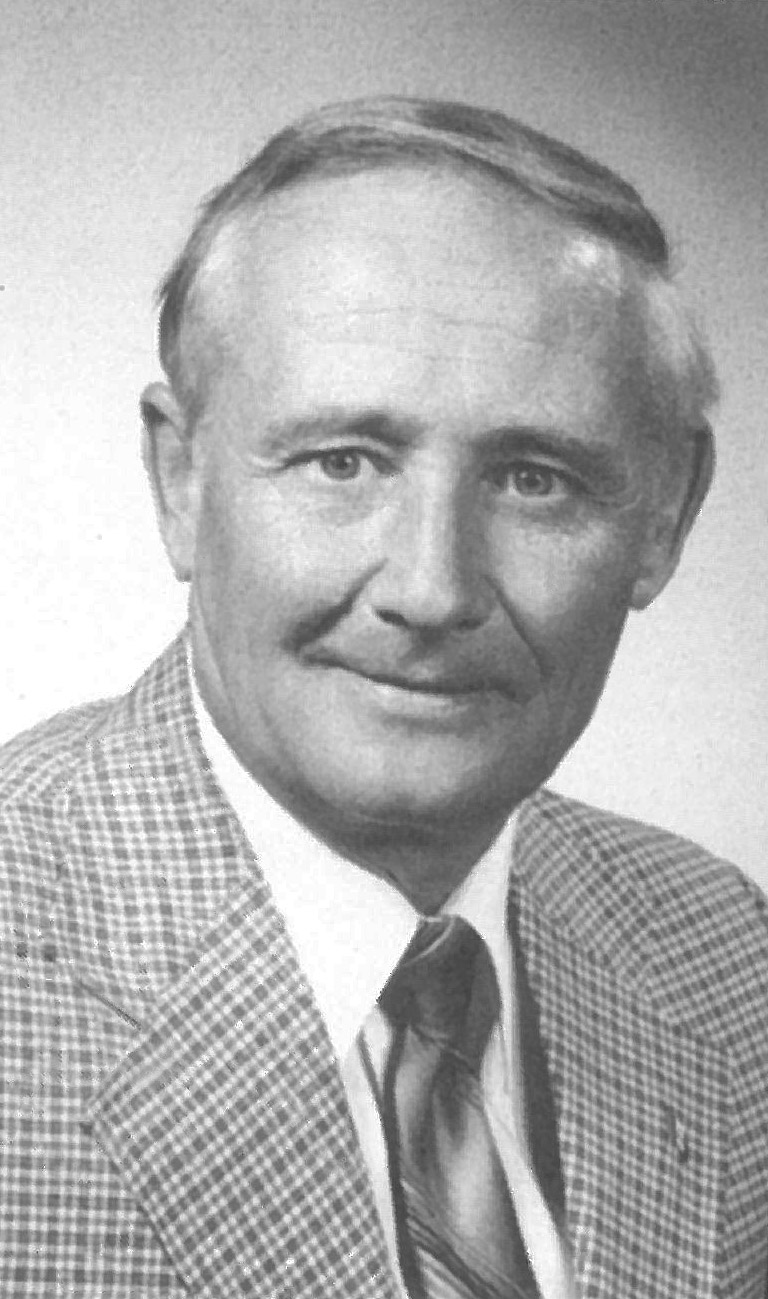

Member of the Iowa Senate from the 36th district
- In office November 8, 1983 – January 10, 1993
- Preceded by: Michael Lura
- Succeeded by: Elaine Szymoniak

Personal details
- Born: December 19, 1930 Marshalltown, Iowa
- Died: December 28, 2012 (aged 82) Des Moines, Iowa
- Party: Republican

John E. Soorholtz (19 December 1930 – 28 December 2012) was an American farmer and politician from Iowa.

John Soorholtz was born in Marshalltown, Iowa, on 19 December 1930, to parents Howard and Edna. He graduated from Melbourne High School in Melbourne in 1949, then attended Iowa State University. During the Korean War, Soorholtz was deployed to Germany. He married Barbara Herbert in 1951, with whom he raised five daughters. Soorholtz was a longtime hog farmer and active in many pork production organizations. He led the Iowa Pork Producers Association as president from 1969 to 1972, when he was named president of the Iowa Hampshire Association. Soorholtz retained the latter presidency until 1974, and also served the National Pork Council in the same role. Additionally he chaired the Iowa Beginning Farmers’ Program and Purebred Swine Council. By 1980, he was a board member for the Iowa Family Farm Development Authority. His career as a farmer was acknowledged by induction into the Iowa Farm Bureau Federation Hall of Fame and the National Pork Producers Council Hall of Fame.

Soorholtz expressed support for George H. W. Bush prior to the 1980 Republican Party presidential primaries. In 1983, Soorholtz contested a special election for District 36 of the Iowa Senate as a Republican candidate, and defeated incumbent state representative Thomas E. Swartz, the Democratic Party nominee. Soorholtz took office on 8 November 1983, and was subsequently elected to two full terms, retiring from the state senate on 10 January 1993. In 1998 and 2002, Soorholtz won a seat on the Marshall County Board of Supervisors, which he held until 2006. Soorholtz died on 28 December 2012, at Mercy Medical Center – Des Moines. Representatives from the National Pork Board attended his visitation, held on 3 January 2013.
