= Iowa's 46th Senate district =

American legislative district

Senate District 46
- Type: District of the Upper House
- Location: Eastern Iowa
- Senator: Mark Lofgren (R)
- Parent organization: Iowa General Assembly

The 46th District of the Iowa Senate is located in eastern Iowa, and is currently composed of Iowa and Washington counties, as well as part of Johnson County.

== Current elected officials ==
Mark Lofgren is the senator currently representing the 46th District.

The area of the 46th District contains two Iowa House of Representatives districts:

- The 91st District (represented by Mark Cisneros)
- The 92nd District (represented by Ross Paustian)

The district is also located in Iowa's 2nd congressional district, which is represented by Mariannette Miller-Meeks.

== Past senators ==
The district has previously been represented by:

- Delbert W. Floy, 1965–1966
- Merle W. Hagedorn, 1967–1968
- J. Leslie Leonard, 1969–1970
- Charles Peter Miller, 1971–1972
- Bass Van Gilst, 1973–1982
- James E. Briles, 1983–1984
- Leonard Boswell, 1985–1992
- Patty Judge, 1993–1998
- John Judge, 1999–2000
- Paul McKinley, 2001–2002
- Gene Fraise, 2003–2012
- Chris Brase, 2013–2016
- Mark Lofgren, 2017–present
