= Beverly Hannon =

State senator for Iowa

Member of the Iowa State Senate
- In office 1985–1993

Personal details
- Born: March 30, 1932 (age 94) Manchester, Iowa, United States
- Party: Democrat
- Spouse: David L Hannon (1961–)
- Children: 6
- Education: Kirkwood Community College - 1982, University of Iowa - 1990
- Occupation: mother/wife/activist/former senator

Beverly Ann Hannon (née Hahesy) (born Manchester, Iowa, March 30, 1932) served two terms as state senator for Iowa. Hannon was chair of the Human Resources Committee and helped found the Democratic Activist Women's Network.

She was inducted into the Iowa Democratic Party's Hall of Fame in 2015.

Bills introduced by Senator Hannon include:

- The "Potty Parity Bill"
- Iowa's Anti-stalking Law
