= Bill Hansen (politician) =

American politician (1931–2021)

Member of the Iowa State Senate
- In office 1973–1981

Member of the Iowa House of Representatives
- In office 1969–1973
- Succeeded by: Chuck Grassley

Personal details
- Born: Willard R. Hansen; March 11, 1931 Cedar Falls, Iowa, U.S.
- Died: August 22, 2021 (aged 90) Waterloo, Iowa, U.S.
- Party: Republican
- Spouse: Maree Eike Lawson
- Children: Bruce, Cheryl and Mark
- Education: Dana College
- Occupation: Insurance Executive, Realtor

Willard R. Hansen (March 11, 1931 – August 22, 2021) was an American politician in the state of Iowa.

== Biography ==
Willard R. Hansen was born in Cedar Falls, Iowa on March 11, 1931. He attended Dana College and was an insurance executive and realtor. He was former president of Cedar Falls Chamber of Commerce. He appeared in 1955 edition Outstanding Young Men of America. In addition to that he won the Recipient Jaycee Distinguished Service Award in 1962, Distinguished Service Award from Cedar Falls Education Association and Phi Beta Lambida in 1972, and University of Northern Iowa Alumni Service Award in 1973. He served in the Iowa State Senate from 1973 to 1981, and Iowa House of Representatives from 1969 to 1973 as a Republican. Hansen died in Waterloo, Iowa on August 22, 2021, at the age of 90.
