= Bass Van Gilst =

American politician

Member of the Iowa Senate from the 34th district
- In office January 10, 1983 – January 13, 1985
- Preceded by: George Kinley
- Succeeded by: John A. Peterson

Member of the Iowa Senate from the 46th district
- In office January 8, 1973 – January 9, 1983
- Preceded by: Charles Peter Miller
- Succeeded by: James E. Briles

Member of the Iowa Senate from the 44th district
- In office January 11, 1971 – January 7, 1973
- Preceded by: Wayne Dalton Keith
- Succeeded by: Forrest Schwengels

Member of the Iowa Senate from the 10th district
- In office January 9, 1967 – January 10, 1971
- Preceded by: Richard Lytle Stephens
- Succeeded by: Ralph Wilson Potter

Member of the Iowa Senate from the 11th district
- In office January 11, 1965 – January 8, 1967
- Preceded by: J. Louis Fisher
- Succeeded by: Stanley Heaberlin

Personal details
- Born: April 14, 1911 Marion County, Iowa
- Died: December 2, 1996 (aged 85) Oskaloosa, Iowa
- Party: Democratic

Bass Van Gilst (April 14, 1911 – December 2, 1996) was an American politician who served in the Iowa Senate from 1965 to 1985.
