= Donald V. Doyle =

American politician (1925–2007)

Donald Vincent Doyle (January 13, 1925 – June 4, 2007) was an American politician from Iowa.

Doyle was a native of Sioux City, Iowa, born to parents William and Nellie, née Sparby, on January 13, 1925. He graduated from Sioux City Central High School. He served in the United States Army Air Forces during World War II and became a corporal. He was deployed primarily to the China Burma India Theater. Doyle was a student of Colorado A&M and the University of Colorado, where he studied engineering, as well as the University of Nebraska. He earned his bachelor's degree from Morningside College and pursued legal studies at the University of South Dakota School of Law, completing his juris doctor degree at Morningside. Later, Doyle pursued studies in nuclear science at the University of Iowa. He practiced law in Sioux City for over five decades.

Doyle represented Woodbury County in the Iowa General Assembly from 1957 to 1993 as a Democrat. From 1957 to 1971, he held the 58th district seat in the Iowa House of Representatives. Between 1971 and 1973, Doyle's district was numbered 21st. Thereafter, he remained a state representative for three more terms, representing the 51st district until 1981. In the 1980 election cycle, Doyle won the 26th district seat on the Iowa Senate. He occupied the seat until 1983, when he assumed the District 2 seat, which he held until his retirement in 1993.

Doyle married Janet Holtz in 1963, with whom he had two children. He died on June 4, 2007, aged 82, and was buried at Calvary Cemetery.
