= Forrest Schwengels =

American politician

Member of the Iowa Senate from the 32nd district
- In office January 10, 1983 – January 8, 1989
- Preceded by: William D. Palmer
- Succeeded by: H. Kay Hedge

Member of the Iowa Senate from the 44th district
- In office January 8, 1973 – January 9, 1983
- Preceded by: Bass Van Gilst
- Succeeded by: Jack Nystrom

Personal details
- Born: August 27, 1915 Sheffield, Iowa
- Died: April 10, 1989 (aged 73) Fairfield, Iowa
- Party: Republican

Forrest Schwengels (August 27, 1915 – April 10, 1989) was an American politician who served in the Iowa Senate from 1973 to 1989. He was the brother of Fred Schwengel.
