= Merlin Hulse =

American politician (born 1923)

Member of the Iowa Senate
- In office 1977–1985

Personal details
- Born: Merlin Dick Hulse; September 21, 1923 (age 102) Clarence, Iowa, U.S.
- Party: Republican
- Spouse: Darleen Prange (m. 1945)
- Children: 2
- Occupation: Politician, farmer, educator

Merlin Dick Hulse (born September 21, 1923) is an American former politician and farmer in the state of Iowa.

== Biography ==
Hulse was born in Clarence, Iowa, to Richard and Eleanor Hulse . He graduated Clarence High School in 1941. He served in the Iowa State Senate from 1977 to 1985 as a Republican. As of September 2020, Hulse lives in Tipton, Iowa. He is a farmer and educator who was recognised as Cedar County Outstanding Young Farmer in 1957 and Master Swine Producer in 1965.

Hulse turned 100 on September 21, 2023.
