= Edgar Holden =

American politician (1914–2001)

Member of the Iowa Senate from the 20th district
- In office January 10, 1983 – January 8, 1989
- Preceded by: Michael R. Lura
- Succeeded by: Maggie Tinsman

Member of the Iowa Senate from the 40th district
- In office December 13, 1977 – January 9, 1983
- Preceded by: Elizabeth Orr Shaw
- Succeeded by: George Kinley

Member of the Iowa House of Representatives from the 24th district
- In office January 8, 1973 – January 12, 1975
- Preceded by: Hallie L. Sargisson
- Succeeded by: Herbert C. Hinkhouse

Member of the Iowa House of Representatives from the 75th district
- In office January 11, 1971 – January 7, 1973
- Preceded by: Lucile Duitscher
- Succeeded by: David M. Stanley

Member of the Iowa House of Representatives from the 43rd district
- In office January 9, 1967 – January 10, 1971
- Preceded by: Foster F. Felger
- Succeeded by: Richard M. Radl

Personal details
- Born: March 24, 1914 Tama, Iowa
- Died: August 21, 2001 (aged 87) Davenport, Iowa
- Party: Republican

Edgar Holden (March 24, 1914 – August 21, 2001) was an American politician who served in the Iowa House of Representatives from 1967 to 1975 and in the Iowa Senate from 1977 to 1989.

He died of prostate cancer on August 21, 2001, in Davenport, Iowa at age 87.
