= Berl Priebe =

American politician

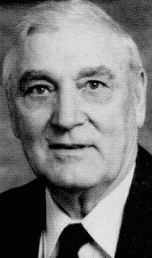
- State Senator Portrait

Member of the Iowa Senate from the 8th district
- In office January 10, 1983 – January 12, 1997
- Preceded by: Rolf Craft
- Succeeded by: James Black

Member of the Iowa Senate from the 4th district
- In office January 8, 1973 – January 9, 1983
- Preceded by: Richard Vande Hoef
- Succeeded by: H. L. Ollenburg

Member of the Iowa House of Representatives from the 6th district
- In office January 11, 1971 – January 7, 1973
- Succeeded by: Dennis L. Freeman

Member of the Iowa House of Representatives from the 85th district
- In office January 13, 1969 – January 10, 1971
- Succeeded by: Norman Rodgers

Personal details
- Born: Berl Eastman Priebe; May 31, 1918 Lone Rock, Iowa, U.S.
- Died: July 20, 2014 (aged 96) Algona, Iowa, U.S.
- Party: Democratic
- Spouse: Madelyn Paetz (m. 1938)

Berl Eastman Priebe (May 31, 1918 – July 20, 2014) was an American farmer, livestock dealer, and politician. A member of the Democratic Party, he served in the Iowa House of Representatives (1969–1973) and the Iowa Senate (1973–1997), representing districts in north-central Iowa.

== Early life and education ==
Priebe was born near Lone Rock, Iowa, the son of Clarence and Amy (Bond) Priebe. He graduated from Bancroft High School in 1935 and married Madelyn Paetz in 1938.

== Agricultural career ==
Priebe worked as a farmer and livestock dealer and was active in cattle organizations, including the Iowa State and American Angus associations. He also served in local agricultural and civic roles, including as president of the Kossuth County Fair Board and as a 4-H leader.

== Political career ==
Priebe was elected to the Iowa House of Representatives in 1968 and served from 1969 to 1973. He was elected to the Iowa Senate in 1972 and served from 1973 to 1997.

During the 76th General Assembly (mid-1990s), Priebe chaired the Senate Agriculture Committee and served on the Commerce; Natural Resources, Environment & Energy; and Ways & Means committees, and was vice chair of the Agriculture/Natural Resources appropriations subcommittee. A separate committee roster for the 75th General Assembly also lists him as chair of the Senate Agriculture Committee.

== Legal case ==
In 1959, Priebe was the named parent and natural guardian for his daughter in an Iowa Supreme Court case, Paula Priebe (by Berl E. Priebe) v. Kossuth County Agricultural Association, Inc.

== Agricultural advocacy and public disputes ==
According to later reporting, Priebe drew national attention in 1996 after criticizing television host Oprah Winfrey following an episode of The Oprah Winfrey Show about “mad cow disease.” He argued the broadcast harmed cattle prices and urged Winfrey to tell viewers the disease had not been found in the United States at the time.

== Horse racing ==
Priebe also appeared in thoroughbred racing records as an owner, including for the horse Governor's Jet.

== Death ==
Priebe died in Algona, Iowa, at age 96. The Iowa Legislature biography lists his death date as July 20, 2014, while his funeral home obituary lists July 21, 2014.

== Images ==
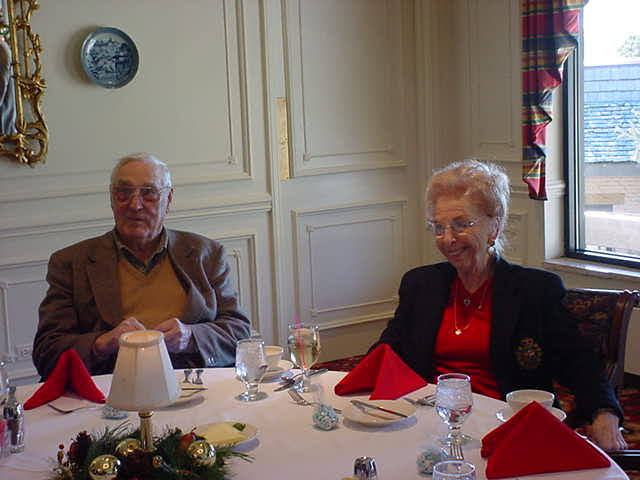
Berl Priebe with his wife Madelyn

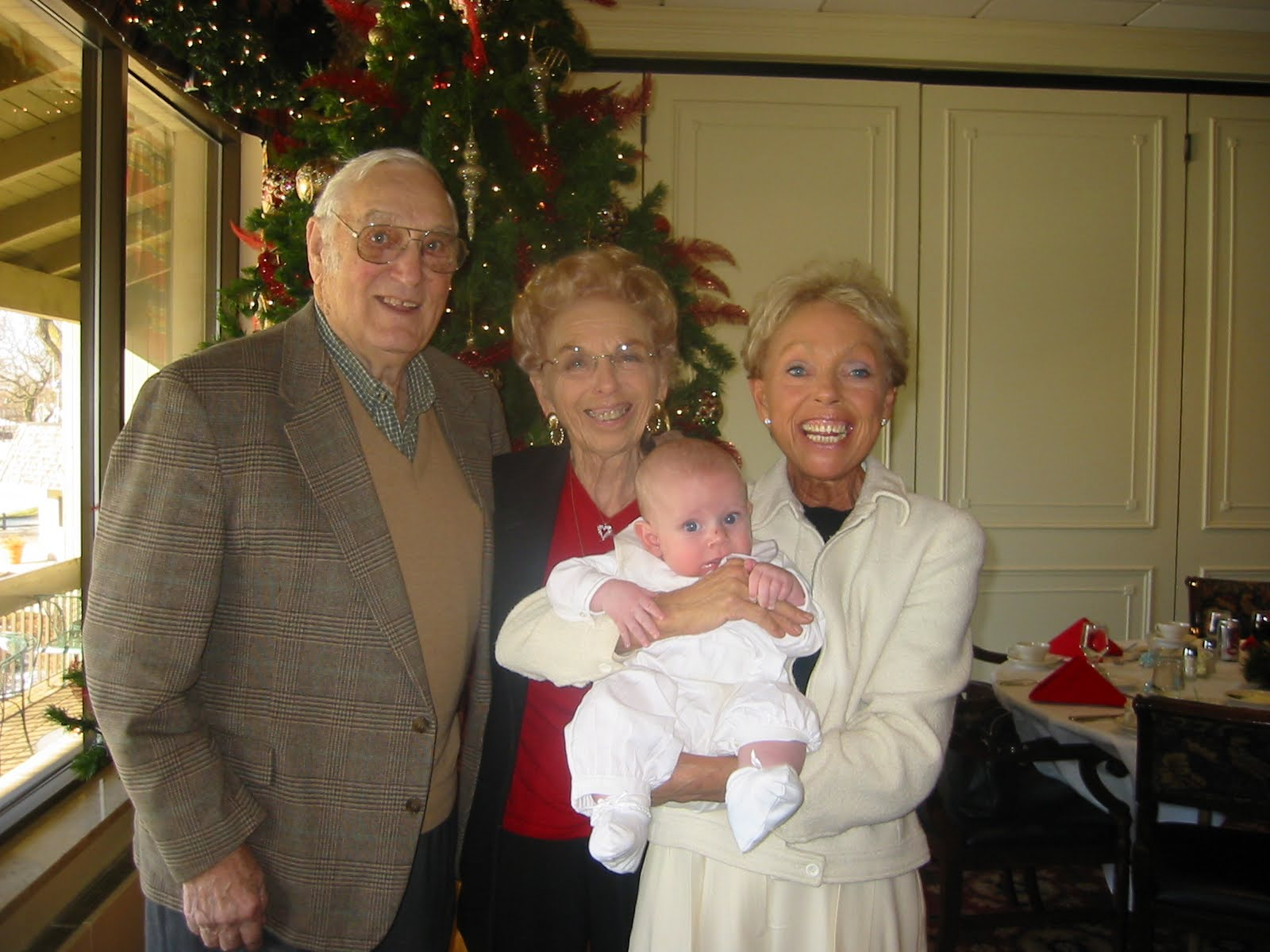
Berl Priebe with Madelyn, daughter Paula, and great-grandson Grant

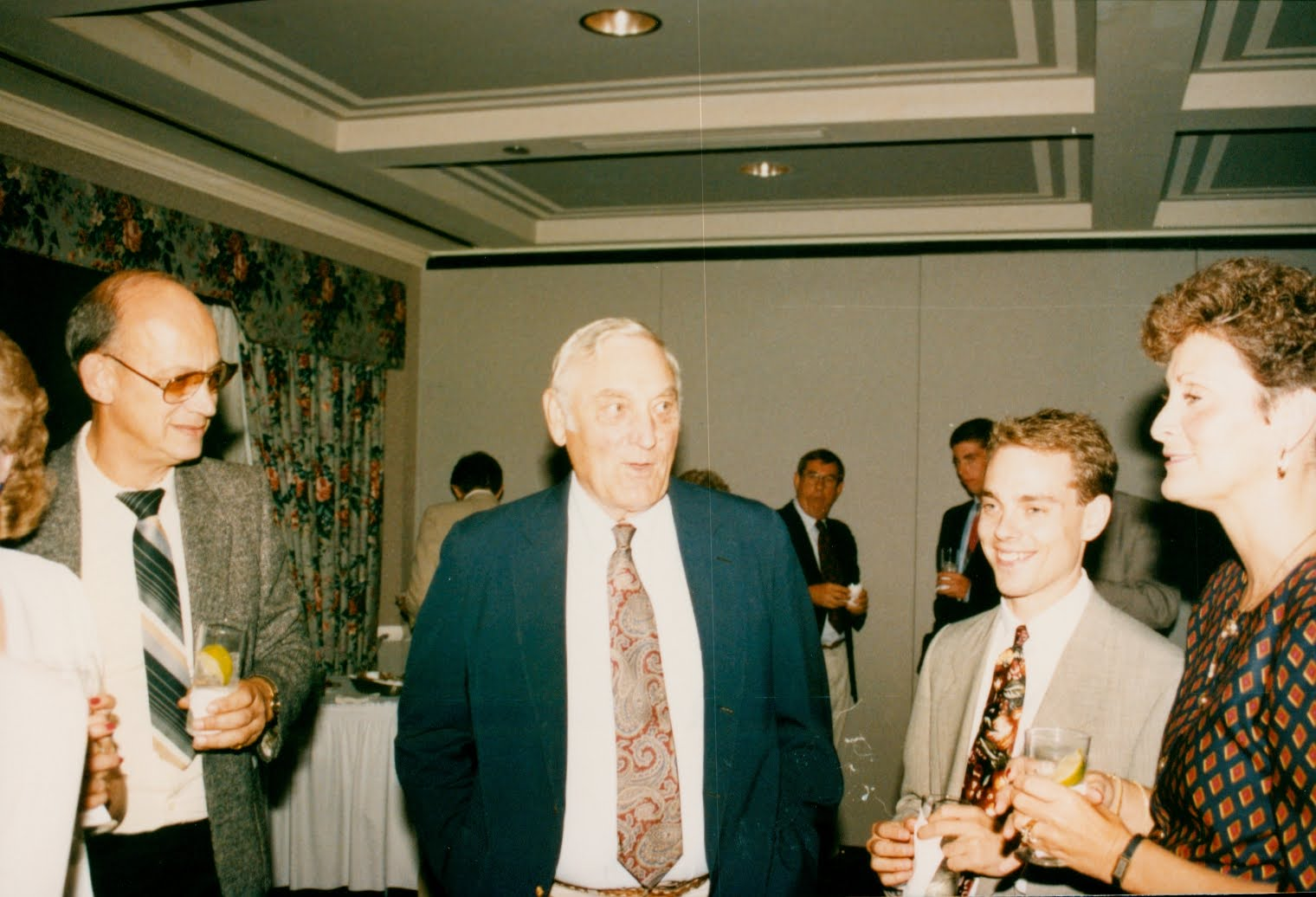
Priebe at a family wedding

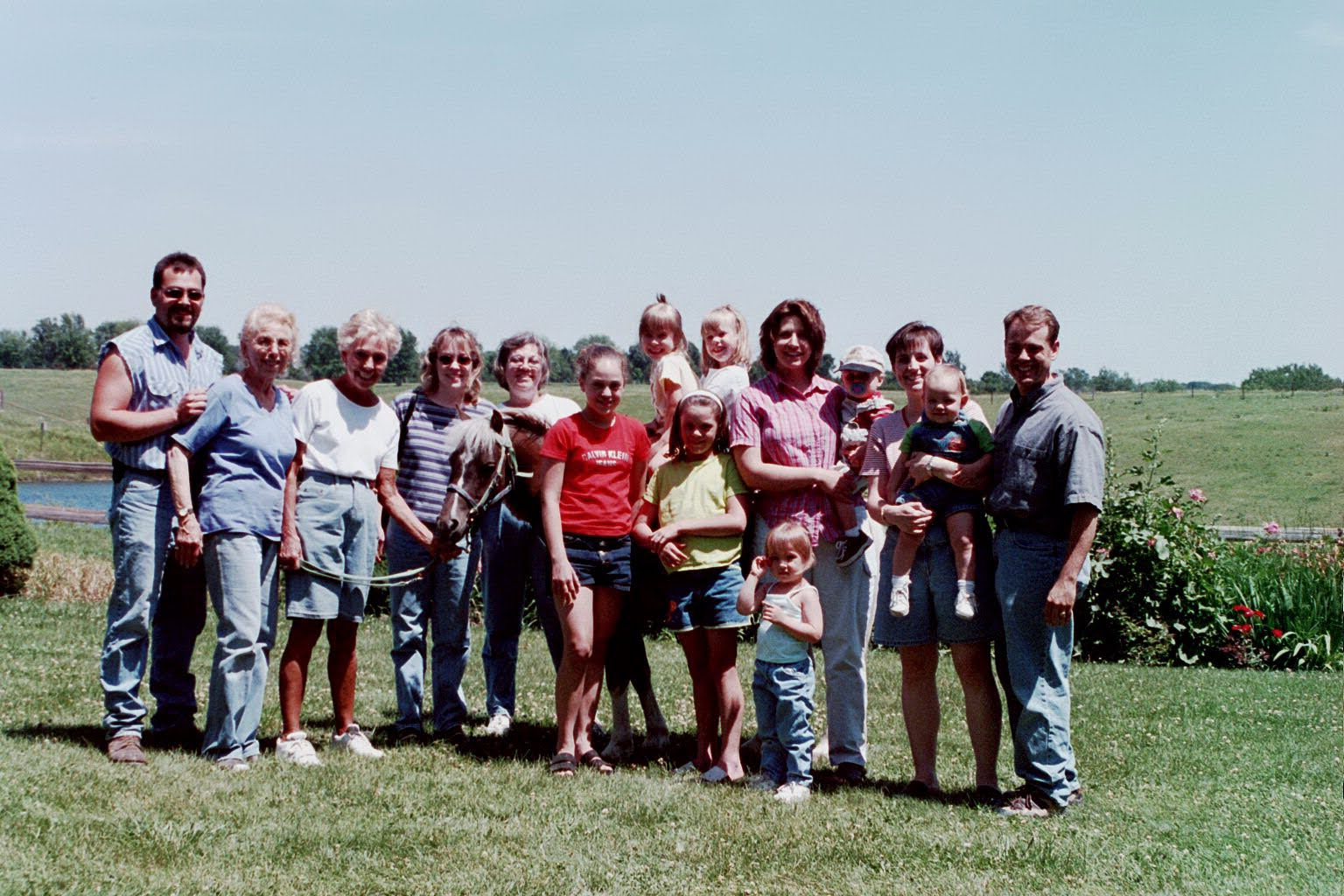
Priebe family photo

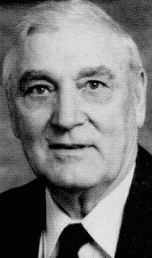
Official state senate portrait
