= James D. Wells (politician) =

American politician (1928–2010)

James D. Wells (7 August 1928 – 6 July 2010) was an American politician from Iowa.

== Early life and education ==
James D. Wells was born in Marathon, Iowa, to parents W. W. and Florence Wells on 7 August 1928. He attended Marathon High School.

== Career ==
He was later employed by the Quaker Oats Company and active in Local 110 of the Retail, Wholesale and Department Store Union, as well as a United States Army reservist attached to the 328th Combat Battalion. Wells served in the Iowa General Assembly from 1969 to 1989 as a Democrat. Wells's served one two-year term each in the Iowa House of Representatives for District 48 and District 44. For the subsequent four terms, between 1973 and 1981, Wells was reelected from District 27. Thereafter, Wells was elected to the Iowa Senate, serving District 14 for two years, then District 26 for six years.

== Death ==
He died at the age of 81 on 6 July 2010.
