= Iowa's 24th Senate district =

American legislative district

Iowa's 24th State Senate district
Senator
Jesse Green; R

The 24th District of the Iowa Senate is located in central Iowa, and is currently composed of Greene, Guthrie, and Boone counties, as well as part of Dallas and Story counties.

== Current elected officials ==
Jesse Green is the state senator currently representing the 24th District.

The area of the 24th District contains two Iowa House of Representatives districts:

- The 47th District represented by State Representative Phil Thompson
- The 48th District represented by State Representative Robert Bacon

The district is also located in Iowa's 4th congressional district, which is represented by Randy Feenstra.

== Past senators ==
The district has previously been represented by:

- Hurley Hall, 1983–1988
- Paul Pate, 1989–1992
- Richard F. Drake, 1993–2002
- Jerry Behn, 2003–2021
- Jesse Green, 2021–present

== Recent election results from statewide races ==
Year	Office	Results
2008	President	Obama 51–46%
2012	President	Obama 52–48%
2016	President	Trump 54–38%
2016	Senate	Grassley 62–33%
2018	Governor	Reynolds 52–46%
2018	Attorney General	Miller 75–25%
2018	Secretary of State	Pate 56–42%
2018	Treasurer	Fitzgerald 55–42%
2018	Auditor	Sand 49–48%
2020	President	Trump 58–40%
2020	Senate	Ernst 56–41%
2022	Senate	Grassley 60–40%
2022	Governor	Reynolds 62–35%
2022	Attorney General	Bird 53–47%
2022	Secretary of State	Pate 66–34%
2022	Treasurer	Smith 52–48%
2022	Auditor	Halbur 51–49%
2024	President	Trump 61–38%

== See also ==
- Iowa General Assembly
- Iowa Senate
