= Emil J. Husak =

American politician (1930–1997)

Emil Husak

Member of the Iowa House of Representatives
- In office 1971–1981

Member of the Iowa State Senate
- In office 1981–1997

Personal details
- Born: September 18, 1930 Toledo, Iowa, United States
- Died: July 30, 1997 (aged 66)
- Party: Democratic
- Spouse: Dorothy Uhlenberg (m. 1955)
- Children: 5
- Occupation: Farmer

Emil Joseph Husak (September 18, 1930 – July 30, 1997) was an American politician in the state of Iowa.

Husak was born in Toledo, Iowa. He was a farmer and former school bus driver. Husak served as a Democrat in the Iowa House from 1971 to 1981, and in the State Senate from 1981 to 1997.
