= Tom Slater (politician) =

American politician

Member of the Iowa Senate from the 50th district
- In office January 10, 1977 – January 13, 1985
- Preceded by: James W. Griffin
- Succeeded by: Michael Gronstal

Personal details
- Born: November 5, 1945 (age 80) Templeton, Iowa, U.S.
- Died: March 17, 2018 (aged 72)
- Party: Democratic
- Occupation: businessman

Tom L. Slater (November 5, 1945 – March 17, 2018) was an American politician in the state of Iowa.

Slater was born in Templeton, Iowa and he attended Washburn University and Iowa State University. Slater was a public relations consultant, designer, and businessman. In 1984, he established the State Public Policy Group, which helps nonprofits and other groups with advocacy work on public policy issues that have ranged from homelessness to homeland security. He served in the Iowa State Senate from 1977 to 1985, as a Democrat representing Council Bluffs and Pottawattamie County.
