= Richard Vande Hoef =

American politician (1925–2020)

Member of the Iowa House of Representatives
- In office January 11, 1993 – January 10, 1999

Member of the Iowa State Senate
- In office January 12, 1981 – January 11, 1993

Personal details
- Born: Richard Peter Vande Hoef; May 15, 1925 Boyden, Iowa, U.S.
- Died: December 20, 2020 (aged 95) Sibley, Iowa, U.S.
- Party: Republican
- Spouse: Harriet Van Der Maten
- Occupation: farmer

Richard Peter Vande Hoef (May 15, 1925 – December 20, 2020) was an American politician in the state of Iowa. Vande Hoef was born in Boyden, Iowa, in May 1925. He was a veteran of World War II, serving in the United States Army and worked as a farmer. He served in the 2nd District of the Iowa State Senate from 1981 to 1993, and House of Representatives from 1993 to 1999, as a Republican. Vande Hoef died in December 2020 in Sibley, Iowa, at the age of 95.
