= Iowa's 8th Senate district =

American legislative district

Iowa's 8th State Senate district
Senator
Mark Costello; R

The 8th District of the Iowa Senate is located in Western Iowa, and is currently composed of Fremont, Harrison, and Mills counties, and the majority of Pottawattamie County.

== Current elected officials ==
Mark Costello is the senator currently representing the 8th District.

The area of the 8th District contains two Iowa House of Representatives districts:

- The 15th District (represented by Matt Windschitl)
- The 16th District (represented by David Sieck)

The district is also located in Iowa's 4th congressional district, which is represented by U.S. Representative Randy Feenstra.

== List of representatives ==
Representative	Party	Dates	Residence	Notes
Robert Brown	Democrat	1846-1847	Jefferson County	
John Howell	Democrat	1846-1851	Jefferson County	
Samuel McAchran	Whig	1852-1855	Davis County	
James Ramsey	Democrat	1856-1857	Wapello County	
John Johnson	Democrat	1858-1859	Wapello County	
William Coolbaugh	Democrat	1860-1861	Des Moines County	
John Foote	Republican	1862-1863	Des Moines County	
Lewis Ross	Republican	1864-1867	Council Bluffs, Iowa	
Napoleon Moore	Republican	1868-1871	Clarinda, Iowa	
James McIntyre	Republican	1872-1875	Clarinda, Iowa	
Alfred Hebard	Republican	1876-1883	Red Oak, Iowa	
James Hendrie	Democrat	1884-1887	Mills County	
Thomas Weidman	Republican	1888-1891	Montgomery County	
Allen Chantry	Republican	1892-1895	Malvern, Iowa	
Joseph Junkin	Republican	1896-1903	Montgomery County	
Shirley Gillilland	Republican	1904-1912	Glenwood, Iowa	
Frank Jones	Republican	1913-1916	Villisca, Iowa	
William Ratcliff	Republican	1917-1920	Red Oak, Iowa	
Harman Darting	Republican	1921-1928	Glenwood, Iowa	
William Cochrane	Republican	1929-1932	Red Oak, Iowa	
Homer Hush	Republican	1933-1936	Montgomery County	
Kenneth A. Evans	Republican	1937-1944	Emerson, Iowa	
Oscar Hultman	Republican	1945-1952	Stanton, Iowa	
Henry W. Washburn	Republican	1953-1956	Mills County	
William Harbor	Republican	1957-1960	Mills County	
Edward Wearin	Republican	1961-1962	Montgomery County	
Clifford Vance	Republican	1963-1966	Mount Pleasant, Iowa	
Richard Stephens	Republican	1967-1970	Washington County	
S. J. Brownlee	Republican	1970-1972	Emmettsburg, Iowa	
Hilarius Heying	Democrat	1973-1976	Fayette County	
Rolf Craft	Republican	1977-1982	Winneshiek County	
Berl Priebe	Democrat	1983-1996	Kossuth County	
James Black	Republican	1997	Kossuth County	Resigned from office in 1997.
E. Thurman Gaskill	Republican	1997-2002	Hancock County	
Mark Zieman	Republican	2003-2008	Allamakee County	
Mary Jo Wilhelm	Democrat	2009-2012	Cresco, Iowa	
Michael Gronstal	Democrat	2013-2016	Council Bluffs, Iowa	
Dan Dawson	Republican	2016-2022	Council Bluffs, Iowa	
Mark Costello	Republican	2023–present	Mills County	

== Historical district boundaries ==
Map	Description	Years effective	Notes
	Jefferson County	1846-1851	From 1846 to 1857, district numbering was not utilized by the Iowa State Legislature. This convention was added with the passing of the 1857 Iowa Constitution. Numbering of districts pre-1857 is done as a matter of historic convenience.
	Davis County	1852-1855	
	Wapello County	1856-1859	
	Des Moines County	1860-1863	
	Cass County Fremont County; Mills County; Pottawattamie County	1864-1867	
	Adams County Montgomery County; Page County; Taylor County; Union County	1868-1869	
	Adams County Fremont County; Page County	1870-1873	
	Fremont County Montgomery County; Page County	1874-1877	
	Adams County Mills County; Montgomery County	1878-1883	
	Mills County Montgomery County	1884-1962	
	Henry County Jefferson County	1963-1966	
	Henry County Louisa County; Washington County	1967-1970	
	Buena Vista County Clay County (partial); O'Brien County (partial); Palo Alto County; Pocahontas County	1971-1972	
	Bremer County (partial) Chickasaw County (partial); Fayette County (partial); Howard County (partial); Winneshiek County (partial)	1973-1982	
	Hancock County (partial) Humboldt County; Kossuth County; Palo Alto County (partial); Pocahontas County (partial); Winnebago County (partial)	1983-1992	
	Hancock County Humboldt County; Kossuth County (partial); Winnebago County; Wright County (partial)	1993-2002	
	Allamakee County Chickasaw County; Howard County (partial): Excluding; Riceville; Winneshiek County	2003-2012	
	Pottawattamie County (partial): Carter Lake; Council Bluffs excluding some neighborhoods near Interstate 80 and Interstate 29 interchange.	2013-2022	
	Fremont County Harrison County; Mills County; Pottawattamie County (partial): Excluding; Knox Township; Pleasant Township; Avoca; Council Bluffs; Except portions East of Interstate 80; Carter Lake; Shelby	2023–Present	

== See also ==
- Iowa General Assembly
- Iowa Senate
