= Hurley Hall =

American politician

Member of the Iowa House of Representatives
- In office January 8, 1979 – January 9, 1983

Member of the Iowa State Senate
- In office January 10, 1983 – January 8, 1989

Personal details
- Born: July 4, 1935 (age 91) Oxford Junction, Iowa, United States
- Party: Democratic
- Occupation: Telephone engineer, farmer

Hurley W. Hall (born July 4, 1935) is an American politician in the state of Iowa.

Hall was born in Oxford Junction, Iowa and was an engineer for the Northwestern Bell Telephone Company as well as a farmer. He served in the Iowa House of Representatives from 1979 to 1983 and in the Iowa Senate from 1983 to 1989, as a Democrat.
