= Bill Hutchins =

American politician (1931–2019)

C.W. (Bill) Hutchins
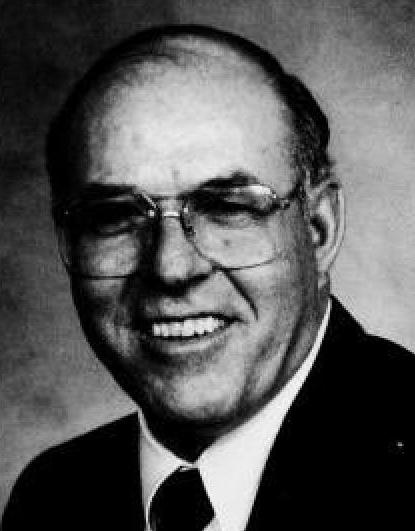

Member of the Iowa State Senate
- In office 1977–1993

Member of the Iowa House of Representatives
- In office 1973–1977

Personal details
- Born: March 29, 1931 Guthrie County, Iowa, U.S.
- Died: December 8, 2019 (aged 88) Johnston, Iowa, U.S.
- Party: Democratic
- Occupation: businessman

Charles William Hutchins (March 29, 1931 – December 8, 2019) was an American politician in the state of Iowa.

Hutchins was born in Guthrie County, Iowa. He attended Audubon High School and was a businessman. He also served in the Korean War in the United States Air Force. He served in the Iowa State Senate from 1977 to 1993, and House of Representatives from 1973 to 1977 as a Democrat. During his time in the Senate, he served as majority leader from 1985 to 1993. Hutchins died in Johnston, Iowa on December 8, 2019, at the age of 88.
