= David Readinger =

American politician

Member of the Iowa State Senate
- In office January 10, 1977 – January 8, 1989

Member of the Iowa State House of Representatives
- In office January 8, 1973 – January 9, 1977

Personal details
- Born: December 23, 1935 (age 90) Des Moines, Iowa, United States
- Party: Republican
- Education: Drake University
- Occupation: salesman

David M. Readinger (born December 23, 1935) is an American politician in the state of Iowa.

Readinger was born in Des Moines, Iowa and attended Drake University. A Republican, he served in the Iowa House of Representatives from 1973 to 1977 (59th district) and the Iowa Senate from 1977 to 1989 (42nd district from 1983 to 1989 and 30th district 1977 to 1983).
