= Iowa's 26th Senate district =

American legislative district

Senate District 26
- Type: District of the Upper House
- Location: Central Iowa
- Senator: Kara Warme
- Parent organization: Iowa General Assembly

The 26th District of the Iowa Senate is located in central Iowa, and is currently composed of Marshall County and part of Story County following redistricting in 2021.

== Current elected officials ==
Kara Warme is the senator currently representing the 26th District.

The area of the 26th District contains two Iowa House of Representatives districts:

- The 51st District (represented by Brett Barker)
- The 52nd District (represented by David Blom)

The district is also located in Iowa's 4th congressional district, which is represented by Randy Feenstra.

== Recent election results from statewide races ==
| Year | Office | Results |
|---|---|---|
| 2008 | President | Obama 51–46% |
| 2012 | President | Obama 52–48% |
| 2016 | President | Trump 51–42% |
| 2016 | Senate | Grassley 60–35% |
| 2018 | Governor | Reynolds 51–47% |
| 2018 | Attorney General | Miller 76–24% |
| 2018 | Secretary of State | Pate 54–43% |
| 2018 | Treasurer | Fitzgerald 57–41% |
| 2018 | Auditor | Mosiman 50–47% |
| 2020 | President | Trump 54–44% |
| 2020 | Senate | Ernst 52–44% |
| 2022 | Senate | Grassley 58–41% |
| 2022 | Governor | Reynolds 60–37% |
| 2022 | Attorney General | Bird 51–49% |
| 2022 | Secretary of State | Pate 64–36% |
| 2022 | Treasurer | Smith 51–49% |
| 2022 | Auditor | Halbur 51–49% |
| 2024 | President | Trump 57–41% |

== Past senators ==
The district has previously been represented by:

- James D. Wells, 1983–1988
- Richard Running, 1989–1992
- Paul Pate, 1993–1994
- Mary Lundby, 1995–2002
- Steve Kettering, 2003–2012
- Mary Jo Wilhelm, 2013–2016
- Waylon Brown, 2017–2023
- Jeff Edler, 2023–2025
- Kara Warme, 2025–present

== See also ==
- Iowa General Assembly
- Iowa Senate
