= James E. Briles =

American politician (1926–1992)

- Born: March 31, 1926; Prescott, Iowa, U.S.
- Died: July 11, 1992 (aged 66)
- Occupation: Politician
- Spouse: Marilyn Briles
- Children: 5 sons, 3 daughters

James E. Briles (March 31, 1926 - July 11, 1992) was an American Republican politician. He served as a member of the Iowa House of Representatives from 1957 to 1965, and the Iowa Senate from 1965 to 1984.
