= Jack Nystrom =

American politician (1933–2004)

Jack N. Nystrom

Member of the Iowa State Senate
- In office 1973–1991

Member of the Iowa House of Representatives
- In office 1971–1973

Personal details
- Born: June 16, 1933 Boone, Iowa, U.S.
- Died: December 5, 2004 (aged 71) Boone, Iowa, U.S.
- Party: Republican
- Spouse(s): Joanne Barnes, m. 1955, div. 1984
- Children: Eric, Ellen, Monica
- Occupation: automobile dealer

John N. Nystrom (June 16, 1933 – December 5, 2004) was an American politician in the state of Iowa.

Nystrom was born in Boone, Iowa. He attended Iowa State University and was an automobile dealer. He served in the Iowa State Senate from 1973 to 1991, and House of Representatives from 1971 to 1973, as a Republican.

Party political offices
Preceded by Maurice E. Baringer	Republican nominee for Treasurer of Iowa; 1986	Succeeded by Burtwin L. Day
