= Richard F. Drake =

American politician (1927–2008)

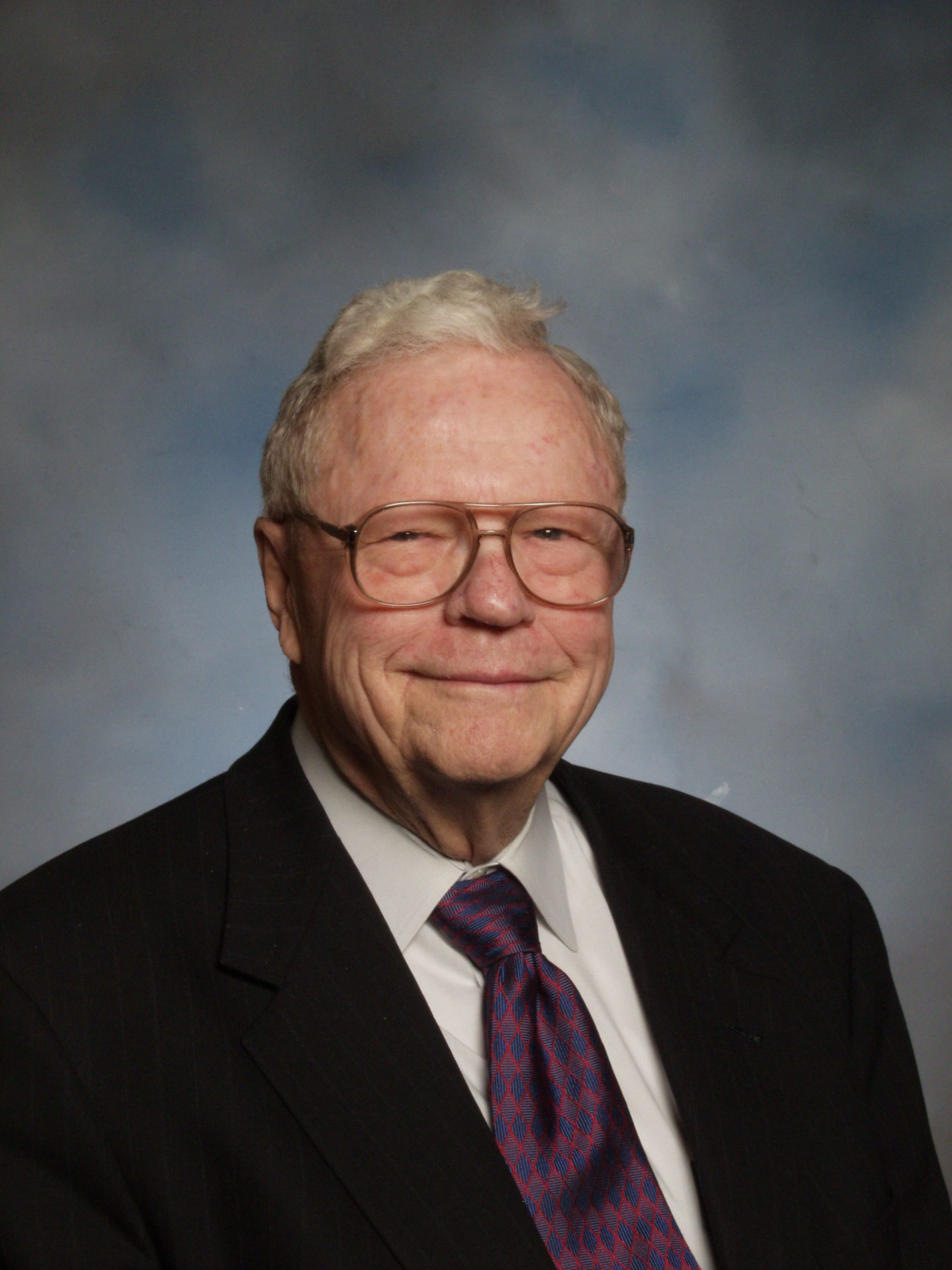
- Official portrait, 2003

Member of the Iowa State Senate
- In office January 10, 1977 – January 9, 2005

Member of the Iowa House of Representatives
- In office January 13, 1969 – January 9, 1977

Personal details
- Born: Richard Francis Drake; September 28, 1927 Muscatine, Iowa, U.S.
- Died: January 26, 2008 (aged 80) Muscatine, Iowa, U.S.
- Party: Republican
- Spouse: Shirley Jean Henke
- Children: 2
- Education: United States Naval Academy; Iowa State University
- Occupation: farmer

Richard Francis Drake (September 28, 1927 – January 26, 2008) was an American politician in the state of Iowa.

Drake was born in Muscatine, Iowa. A farmer, he attended the United States Naval Academy and Iowa State University. A Republican, he also served in the Iowa Senate from 1977 to 2005. Previously, he served in the Iowa House of Representatives from 1969 to 1977. He died in 2008 in Muscatine, Iowa.
