= George Kinley =

American politician (1937–2022)

Member of the Iowa State Senate
- In office 1973–1992

Member of the Iowa House of Representatives
- In office 1971–1973

Personal details
- Born: June 4, 1937 Akron, Ohio, U.S.
- Died: February 23, 2022 (aged 84)
- Party: Democratic
- Education: Drake University
- Occupation: businessman

George Raymond Kinley (June 4, 1937 – February 23, 2022) was an American politician in the state of Iowa and a business co-founder and owner.

== Biography ==
Kinley was born in Akron, Ohio. He moved with his family to Des Moines, Iowa, and graduated from Dowling Catholic High School in Des Moines. Kinley graduated from Drake University, in 1960, with a bachelor's degree in sociology. Kinley was a successful business owner of Kinley's Golf Sales in Des Moines, Iowa, for over 60 years. He served in the Iowa State Senate from 1973 to 1992, and in the Iowa House of Representatives from 1971 to 1973, as a Democrat.

He died on February 23, 2022, at the age of 84.
