= Iowa's 56th House of Representatives district =

American legislative district

House District 56
- Type: District of the Lower house
- Location: Iowa
- Representative: Mark Thompson
- Parent organization: Iowa General Assembly

The 56th District of the Iowa House of Representatives in the state of Iowa is composed of Hancock and Humboldt counties, and part of Wright County.

== Representatives ==
The district has been represented by:

- Conrad R. Fisher, 1971–1973
- Charles W. Hutchins, 1973–1977
- Ernest W. Gilson, 1977–1979
- James O. Anderson, 1979–1983
- Betty Hoffmann-Bright, 1983–1985
- Donald R. Platt, 1985–1989
- Bill Trent, 1989–1991
- James F. Hahn, 1991–1993
- Jerry Welter, 1993–2001
- Gene Manternach, 2001–2003
- Paul Wilderdyke, 2003–2007
- Matt Windschitl, 2007–2013
- Patti Ruff, 2013–2017
- Kristi Hager, 2017–2019
- Anne Osmundson, 2019–2023
- Mark Thompson, 2023-
