= Iowa's 68th House of Representatives district =

American legislative district

House District 68
- Type: District of the Lower house
- Location: Iowa
- Representative: Chad Ingels
- Parent organization: Iowa General Assembly

The 68th District of the Iowa House of Representatives in the state of Iowa. It is currently composed of part of Fayette, Black Hawk, and Buchanan Counties.

== Current elected officials ==
Chad Ingels is the representative currently representing the district.

== Past representatives ==
The district has previously been represented by:

- Clair Strand, 1971–1973
- Jack E. Woods, 1973–1983
- Philip A. Davitt, 1983–1985
- Linda Beatty, 1985–1993
- Michael Cataldo, 1993–2001
- Jack Hatch, 2001–2003
- John Connors, 2003–2005
- Rick Olson, 2005–2013
- Daniel Lundby, 2013–2015
- Ken Rizer, 2015–2019
- Molly Donahue, 2019–2023
- Chad Ingels, 2023–Present
