= Iowa's 64th House of Representatives district =

American legislative district

House District 64
- Type: District of the Lower house
- Location: Iowa
- Representative: Jason Gearhart
- Parent organization: Iowa General Assembly

The 64th District of the Iowa House of Representatives is an electoral district in northeastern portion of Iowa. It is currently composed of Allamakee and Clayton Counties, as well as one precinct in Dubuque County.

== Current elected officials ==
Jason Gearhart currently represents the district.

== Past representatives ==
The district has previously been represented by:

- Luther V. Carter, 1921–1929
- June Franklin, 1971–1973
- John H. Connors, 1973–1983
- Harold Van Maanen, 1983–1993
- Gordon Burke, 1993–1995
- Beverly Nelson, 1995–2001
- Mark Smith, 2001–2003
- Janet Petersen, 2003–2013
- Bruce Bearinger, 2013–2021
- Chad Ingels, 2021–2023
- Anne Osmundson, 2023–2025
- Jason Gearhart, 2025–Present
