= Martin O'Malley 2016 presidential campaign =

O'Malley for President
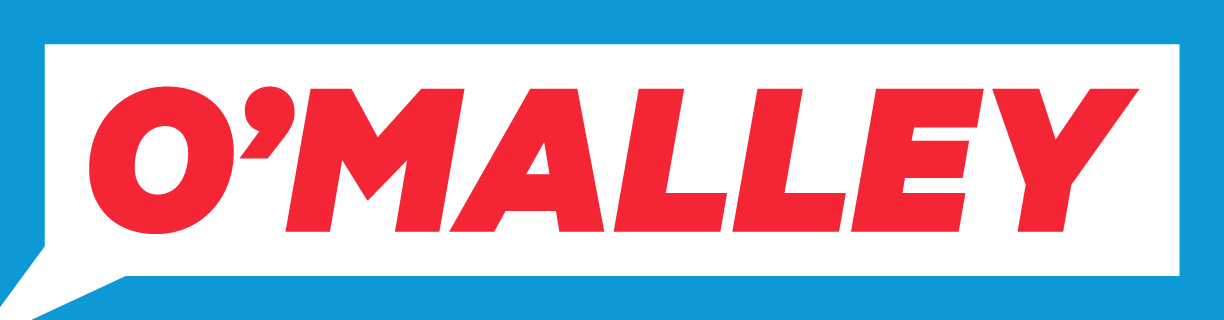
- Campaign: 2016 Democratic Party presidential primaries
- Candidate: Martin O'Malley; 61st Governor of Maryland (2007–2015); 47th Mayor of Baltimore (1999–2007)
- Affiliation: Democratic Party
- Announced: May 30, 2015
- Suspended: February 1, 2016
- Headquarters: 1501 St. Paul Street, Suite 114; Baltimore, Maryland
- Key people: Dave Hamrick (campaign manager); Karine Jean-Pierre (deputy campaign manager); Adam Goers (deputy campaign manager and COO of finance); Lis Smith (deputy campaign manager for communications, policy and research); Bill Hyers (chief strategist); Sarah Miller (policy director); Gabriela Domenzain (director of public engagement)
- Receipts: US$6,073,767 (2016-02-29)
- Slogan: Rebuild the American Dream

Website
- www.martinomalley.com/ (archived - January 31, 2016)

The 2016 presidential campaign of Martin O'Malley, the 61st governor of Maryland, was formally launched on May 30, 2015, as O'Malley announced his intention to seek the Democratic Party nomination for the presidency of the United States in the 2016 presidential election. On February 1, 2016, he suspended his campaign after a poor showing in the Iowa caucuses.

O'Malley and Jim Webb would switch places for third place in the polling, behind Hillary Clinton and Bernie Sanders until Webb dropped out. O'Malley dropped out of the race after receiving only 0.54% in the Iowa caucuses.

== Background ==
First elected mayor of Baltimore in 1999, O'Malley was reelected as mayor in 2003. Considering a run for governor in 2002, he instead focused on his mayoralty. In 2006, nearing the end of his second term as mayor, O'Malley announced his candidacy for governor of Maryland, an office which he won by a sizeable margin. He ran against incumbent Republican Bob Ehrlich. O'Malley was reelected by a wider margin in a rematch against former Governor Bob Ehrlich in 2010.

=== Prior presidential elections ===
During the 2008 Democratic presidential primaries, O'Malley endorsed then-U.S. Senator Hillary Clinton over then-Senator Barack Obama. O'Malley served as the chair of Clinton's campaign in Maryland.

=== 2016 election ===
O'Malley had been seen as a potential presidential candidate since at least November 2012. In the next month, he said that Clinton, who launched her own 2016 campaign, would be a "great president", brushing off questions about his own potential candidacy and commenting that he would have to do "a lot of soul-searching and discernment and introspection."

== Campaign ==
The day prior to his announcement, May 29, O'Malley released a video of himself strumming the presidential fanfare "Hail to the Chief" on his guitar, alluding to his impending announcement. The following day, May 30, he launched his campaign at a scheduled rally in Baltimore, Maryland.

On January 20, 2016, the Federal Election Commission announced that his campaign would receive $846,365.09 in federal matching funds, on top of an initial $100,000 the campaign received after qualifying for matching funds. In November 2015, O'Malley became the first 2016 presidential candidate to be declared eligible by the commission to receive federal matching funds.

On February 1, 2016, O'Malley announced the suspension of his campaign after a poor showing in the Iowa caucuses.

On June 9, 2016, O'Malley endorsed Hillary Clinton.

== Positions ==
=== Living wage ===
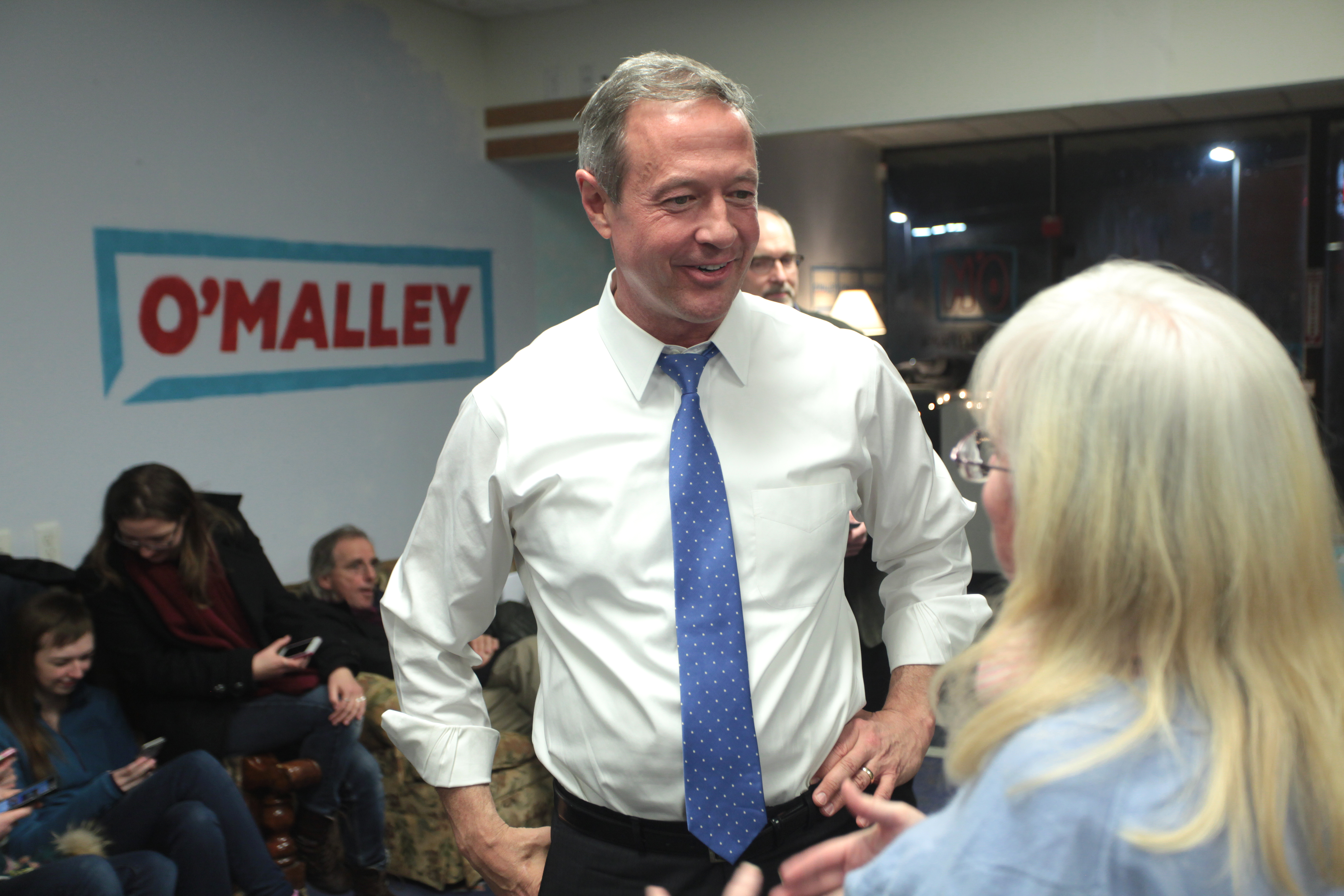
O'Malley speaking with supporters at a campaign event in Manchester, New Hampshire

During a speech at Harvard's Institute of Politics, O'Malley stated his support for a $15 minimum wage, claiming that it would "fuel economic growth, greater consumer demand." He was careful to refer to his support for a "living wage" rather than a "minimum wage." During his final year serving as the governor of Maryland, O'Malley signed a bill to gradually raise the minimum wage to $10.10 an hour. This followed a 2007 "living wage" law requiring government contractors to pay their employees significantly more than the minimum wage; the exact level of wage increase varied from county to county depending on the cost of living.

=== Financial regulation ===
O'Malley made financial regulation a significant plank of his platform, placing such great emphasis on it that he was nicknamed "the Glass-Steagall candidate." This name also stems from his strong support for the reinstatement of the provision of the Glass-Steagall Act separating commercial and investment banking. O'Malley favored breaking up the nation's biggest financial institutions in order to prevent a repeat of the 2008 financial crisis, in which a number of banks were declared "too big to fail."

=== Immigration reform ===
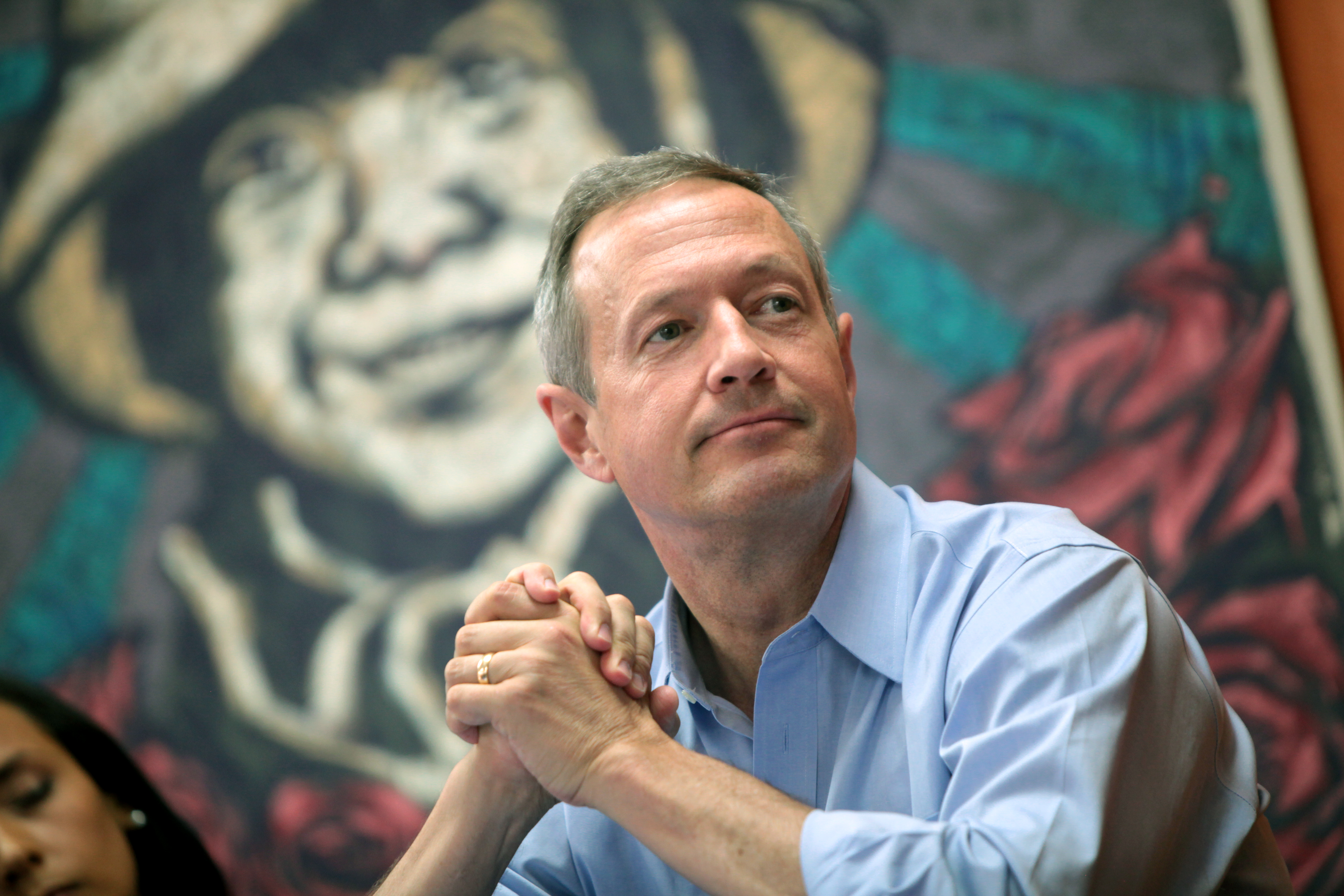
O'Malley speaking at an immigration roundtable in Phoenix, Arizona

Many in the Latino community considered O'Malley a strong ally on immigration reform. Congressman Luis Gutiérrez called him a "champion" of immigration in 2014 when the two were working to oppose the White House's deportation policy. O'Malley's support for allowing minors escaping violence in their home countries to stay in the United States put him at odds with the White House, which favored sending them home. When he was governor of Maryland, O'Malley signed a statewide DREAM Act allowing young illegal immigrants to pay in-state college tuition and a bill to get driver's licenses.

=== Gun control ===
O'Malley is a gun control advocate. In May 2013 he signed the Firearm Safety Act, which bans magazines that hold more than 10 bullets; bans 45 types of semiautomatic rifles; and requires people seeking to buy any gun other than a hunting rifle or shotgun to obtain a license, submit fingerprints to police, undergo a background check and pass classroom and firing-range training in Maryland. He called for a national assault weapons ban. O'Malley said that he was "pissed" about the gun control climate, and that Congress was not doing anything about it.

=== Right-to-vote amendment ===
In August 2015, O'Malley marked the 50th anniversary of the Voting Rights Act in South Carolina by calling for a constitutional amendment to "protect every citizen's right to vote, once and for all." He added that "Passing a constitutional amendment that enshrines that right... will give U.S. courts the clarity they need to strike down Republican efforts to suppress the vote."

=== Fiscal policy ===
O'Malley generally promoted fiscally progressive economic policies.

== Endorsements ==
Organizations

- Australian Young Labor, NSW Chapter

U.S. Congress

- Michael D. Barnes, representative from Maryland's 8th congressional district (1979–1987)
- Berkley Bedell, representative from Iowa's 6th congressional district (1975–1987)
- John Wiley Bryant, representative from Texas's 5th congressional district (1983–1997)
- John Joseph Cavanaugh III, representative from Nebraska's 2nd congressional district (1977–1981)
- Gary Hart, senator from Colorado (1975–1987)
- Eric Swalwell, representative from California's 15th congressional district (2013–2026)
- Joseph Tydings, senator from Maryland (1965–1971)

U.S. state officials

- Jim Folsom Jr., 50th governor of Alabama (1993–1995)
- Brian Frosh, 46th attorney general of Maryland (2015–2023)
- Parris Glendening, 59th governor of Maryland (1995–2003)
- Chris Gorman, 46th attorney general of Kentucky (1992–1996)
- Harry Hughes, 57th governor of Maryland (1979–1987)
- Daniel Hynes, 6th Illinois comptroller (1999–2011)
- Jonathan Miller, 39th Kentucky state treasurer (2000–2008)
- Brian Schweitzer, 23rd governor of Montana (2005–2013)
- Eliot Spitzer, 54th governor of New York (2007–2008)

U.S. municipal officials

- Chris Abele, 6th executive of Milwaukee County (2011–present)
- Rushern Baker, 7th Prince George's County, Maryland executive (2010–2018)
- Robert W. Curran, Baltimore city councilor(1995–2016)
- Joseph Curtatone, 35th mayor of Somerville, Massachusetts (2004–2022)
- Manny Diaz, 31st mayor of Miami (2001–2009)
- C. Jack Ellis, 40th mayor of Macon, Georgia (1999–2007)
- Mike Fahey, 49th mayor of Omaha (2001–2009)
- Oscar Goodman, 21st mayor of Las Vegas (1999–2011)
- Bill Green, Philadelphia city councilor (2008–2014)
- Tom Hucker, Montgomery County, Maryland councilor (2014–2022)
- Kevin B. Kamenetz, 12th Baltimore County executive (2010–2018)
- Isiah Leggett, 6th Montgomery County, Maryland executive (2006–2018)
- Thomas J. Murphy Jr., 57th mayor of Pittsburgh (1994–2006)
- Matt O'Malley, Boston city councilor (2010–2022)
- Kurt Schmoke, 46th mayor of Baltimore (1987–1999)

State legislators

- Bruce Bearinger, Iowa state representative
- Carlos Bianchi Angleró, Puerto Rico state representative
- Tod Bowman, Iowa state senator (2011–2019)
- Talmadge Branch, Maryland state delegate (1995–present)
- Benjamin Brooks, Maryland state delegate
- Boyd Brown, South Carolina state representative (2008–2012)
- Peter Burling, New Hampshire state senator (2004–2008)
- Betsy Burtis, New Hampshire state representative
- Ginger Crocker, South Carolina state representative (1978–1984)
- Ramón Luis Cruz, Puerto Rico state representative (2013–2024)
- William Cunningham, Illinois state senator (2013–present)
- Gerard F. Doherty, Massachusetts state representative (1957–1965)
- Ann Marie Doory, Maryland state delegate (1987–2010)
- Michael Driscoll, Pennsylvania state representative
- Kathleen M. Dumais, Maryland state delegate (2003–2021)
- Bill Ferguson, Maryland state senator (2011–present)
- Craig Ford, Alabama state representative (2001–2017)
- William Frick, Maryland state delegate (2007–2019)
- Barbara A. Frush, Maryland state delegate (1995–2019)
- Tawanna P. Gaines, Maryland state delegate (2001–2019)
- Anne Healey, Maryland state delegate (1991–present)
- Frank Heffron, New Hampshire state representative
- César Hernández Alfonzo, Puerto Rico state representative (2013–2017)
- Patricia Higgins, New Hampshire state representative
- Bruce Hunter, Iowa state representative (2003–2023)
- Dan Kelley, Iowa state representative (2011–2017)
- Kevin Kinney, Iowa state senator
- Steve Lathrop, Nebraska state legislator (2007–2015)
- Mary Ann Lisanti, Maryland state delegate (2015–2023)
- John Mann, New Hampshire state representative
- Maureen Mann, New Hampshire state representative (2008–2010)
- Andrew Martin, Nevada state assemblyman (2013–2015)
- Charlie McConkey, Iowa state representative
- Nathaniel J. McFadden, Maryland state senator (1995–2019)
- Karen S. Montgomery, Maryland state senator (2011–2016)
- Catherine Mulholland, New Hampshire state representative
- Peter Murphy, Maryland state delegate (2007–2014)
- Sonia Pacheco, Puerto Rico state representative (2013–2017)
- Andrew Platt, Maryland state delegate
- Charlotte Pritt, West Virginia state delegate (1980–1984), West Virginia state senator (1984–1996), Democratic nominee for governor (1996)
- David Schapira, Arizona state senator (2011–2013)
- Vincent Sheheen, South Carolina state senator (2004–2020)
- Jorge Suárez Cáceres, Puerto Rico state senator (2008–2013)
- Rich Taylor, Iowa state senator
- Nelson Torres Yordán, Maryland state delegate (2013–2016)
- Charles Townsend, New Hampshire state representative
- Paul Weissmann, Colorado Senate (2003–2011)
- Karen Lewis Young, Maryland state delegate
- Ronald N. Young, Maryland state senator (2011–2023)

Individuals

- Dropkick Murphys, punk band
- Lyndon LaRouche, political activist and founder of the LaRouche movement
- Yvette Lewis, Maryland DNC member
- Terry Lierman, former Maryland Democratic Party chair
- Phil Noble, entrepreneur
- LuAnn Pedrick, Iowa DNC member
- Ted Sarandos, Netflix executive
- Timothy Simons, actor
