= Luther Carter =

Luther Carter may refer to:

- Luther C. Carter (1805–1875), U.S. Representative from New York
- Luther F. Carter (born 1950), president of Francis Marion University
- Luther V. Carter (1879–1929), member and speaker of the Iowa House of Representatives
