= Rick Olson (Iowa politician) =

American politician

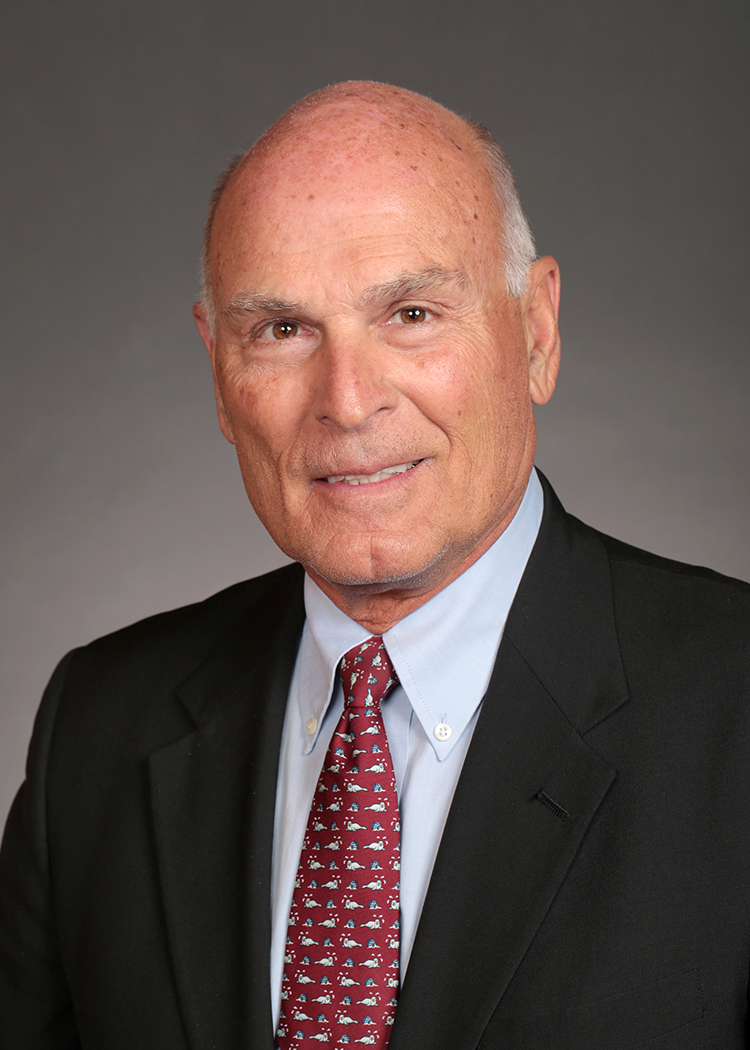
- Olson in 2021

Member of the Iowa House of Representatives from the 39th district
- Incumbent
- Assumed office January 10, 2005
- Preceded by: John Connors

Personal details
- Born: 1951 (age 74–75) Des Moines, Iowa, U.S.
- Party: Democratic
- Spouse: Brenda
- Children: 3
- Education: Drake University
- Profession: Attorney

Rick L. Olson (born 1951) is the Iowa State Representative from the 39th District. A Democrat, he has served in the Iowa House of Representatives since 2005. Olson was born, raised, and resides in Des Moines, Iowa. He attended Grandview College and received his undergraduate degree and his J.D. from Drake University.

As of January 2013, Olson serves on several committees in the Iowa House – the Judiciary, Public Safety, and Transportation committees. He also serves as a member of the Justice System Appropriations Subcommittee.

Olson announced that he would not seek re-election in 2026.

== Electoral history ==
*incumbent

Election	Political result	Candidate	Party	Votes	%
Iowa House of Representatives primary elections, 2006; District 68	Democratic	Rick L. Olson	Democratic	unopposed	
Iowa House of Representatives general elections, 2006; District 68	Democratic hold	Rick L. Olson	Democratic	unopposed	
Iowa House of Representatives primary elections, 2008; District 68	Democratic	Rick L. Olson*	Democratic	unopposed	
Iowa House of Representatives general elections, 2008; District 68; Turnout: 13,705	Democratic hold	Rick L. Olson*	Democratic	8,671	63.27%
Iowa House of Representatives general elections, 2008; District 68; Turnout: 13,705	Democratic hold	Larry Voorhees	Republican	4,267	31.13%
Iowa House of Representatives primary elections, 2010; District 68	Democratic	Rick L. Olson*	Democratic	unopposed	
Iowa House of Representatives general elections, 2010; District 68; Turnout: 9,553	Democratic hold	Rick L. Olson*	Democratic	5,747	60.16%
Iowa House of Representatives general elections, 2010; District 68; Turnout: 9,553	Democratic hold	Dave Dicks	Republican	3,309	34.64%
Iowa House of Representatives primary elections, 2012; District 31	Democratic	Rick L. Olson*	Democratic	unopposed	
Iowa House of Representatives general elections, 2012; District 31	Democratic (newly redistricted)	Rick L. Olson*	Democratic	unopposed	

Iowa House of Representatives
Preceded by John Connors	68th District; 2005–2013	Succeeded by Daniel Lundby
Preceded by Lee Hein	31st District; 2013–2023	Succeeded by Mary Madison
Preceded by Eddie Andrews	39th District; 2023–Present	Succeeded by Incumbent
