= Iowa's 15th House of Representatives district =

American legislative district

House District 15
- Type: District of the Lower house
- Location: Iowa
- Representative: Matt Windschitl
- Parent organization: Iowa General Assembly

The 15th District of the Iowa House of Representatives in the state of Iowa. It is currently composed of Harrison County, as well as part of Pottawattamie County.

== Current elected officials ==
Matt Windschitl is the representative currently representing the district.

== Past representatives ==
The district has previously been represented by:

- Dennis L. Freeman, 1971–1973
- Donald Avenson, 1973–1983
- Sue Mullins, 1983–1989
- Dolores Mertz, 1989–2003
- Brian Quirk, 2003–2013
- Mark Brandenburg, 2013–2015
- Charlie McConkey, 2015–2023
- Matt Windschitl, 2023–2027
- Jason Sherer, 2027
