= James Hahn (disambiguation) =

James Hahn (born 1950) was the 40th mayor of Los Angeles, California.

James or Jim Hahn may also refer to:

- James F. Hahn (born 1935), American politician from Iowa
- James Hahn (golfer) (born 1981), American professional golfer
- James Hahn, United States Navy officer for whom Hahn Island, Antarctica, was named
