= Maureen Mann =

American politician

Member of New Hampshire House of Representatives for Rockingham 32
- In office 2012–2014

Member of New Hampshire House of Representatives for Rockingham 5
- In office 2008–2010

Personal details
- Born: April 14, 1944 Middletown, Connecticut
- Died: September 10, 2023 (aged 79) Deerfield, New Hampshire
- Party: Democratic
- Education: Simmons College; Cambridge College

Maureen Riordan Mann (April 14, 1944 – September 10, 2023) was an American politician. She was a Democrat and represented Rockingham County on the New Hampshire House of Representatives until 2014.

== Life ==
Mann was born in Middletown, Connecticut. After graduating from Woodrow Wilson High School she received a Bachelor's Degree in Education from Simmons College in Boston, and then went on to receive a Master's Degree in Education from Cambridge College. As a teacher she taught history and psychology at Medford High School in Medford, Massachusetts.

Mann won a special election and two full terms to the New Hampshire General Court representing the towns of Deerfield, Northwood, Nottingham, and Candia. She was narrowly defeated in 2014. In 2015, she was a candidate in a special election for Rockingham District 32. She endorsed Martin O'Malley's campaign in the 2016 US presidential election.
