= Jason Gearhart =

American politician

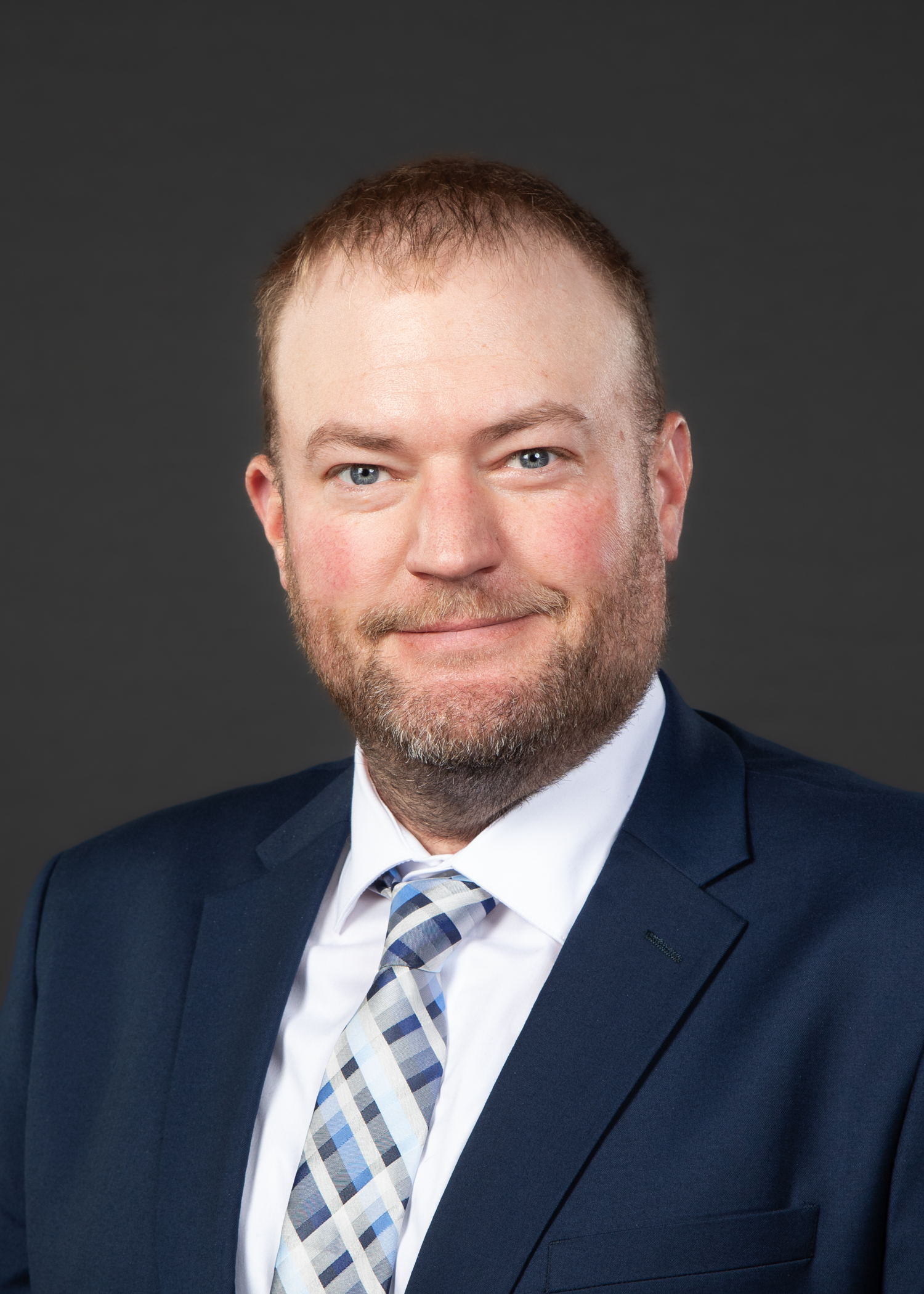

Member of the Iowa House of Representatives from the 64th district
- Incumbent
- Assumed office January 13, 2025
- Preceded by: Anne Osmundson

Personal details
- Born: August 16, 1983 (age 43)
- Party: Republican
- Spouse: Kaylea Gearhart
- Children: 2
- Education: Upper Iowa University
- Profession: Environmental Specialist, Iowa DNR
- Website: gearhartforiowa64.com

Jason Gearhart (born August 16, 1983) is an American politician. A member of the Republican party, he has served as the Iowa State Representative for its 64th district since 2025.

== Iowa House of Representatives ==
In 2024, Gearhart ran for election to the Iowa House of Representatives to represent District 64. He defeated Ian Zahren, 67% to 32%.

For the 91st General Assembly, Gearhart serves on the following committees:

- Iowa House Agriculture Committee
- Natural Resources Committee
- Public Safety Committee
- House Veterans Affairs Committee, Vice Chair
- Health and Human Services Appropriations Subcommittee

== Personal life ==
Gearhart was born in Manchester, Iowa. He was raised in Dundee, Iowa. His father Terry is a farmer, and his mother, Rhonda works at nursing care facility. Gearhart has two sisters.

He graduated from West Delaware High School in 2001 where he was active in the local FFA chapter. After graduating, he enlisted in the United States army, serving active duty for five years as a military police officer and investigator. He was stationed at Camp Page and Camp Casey South Korea and Fort Belvoir, Virginia.

In 2014, he received his bachelor's degree in public administration from Upper Iowa University.
