= Mark Thompson (Iowa politician) =

American politician (born 1955)

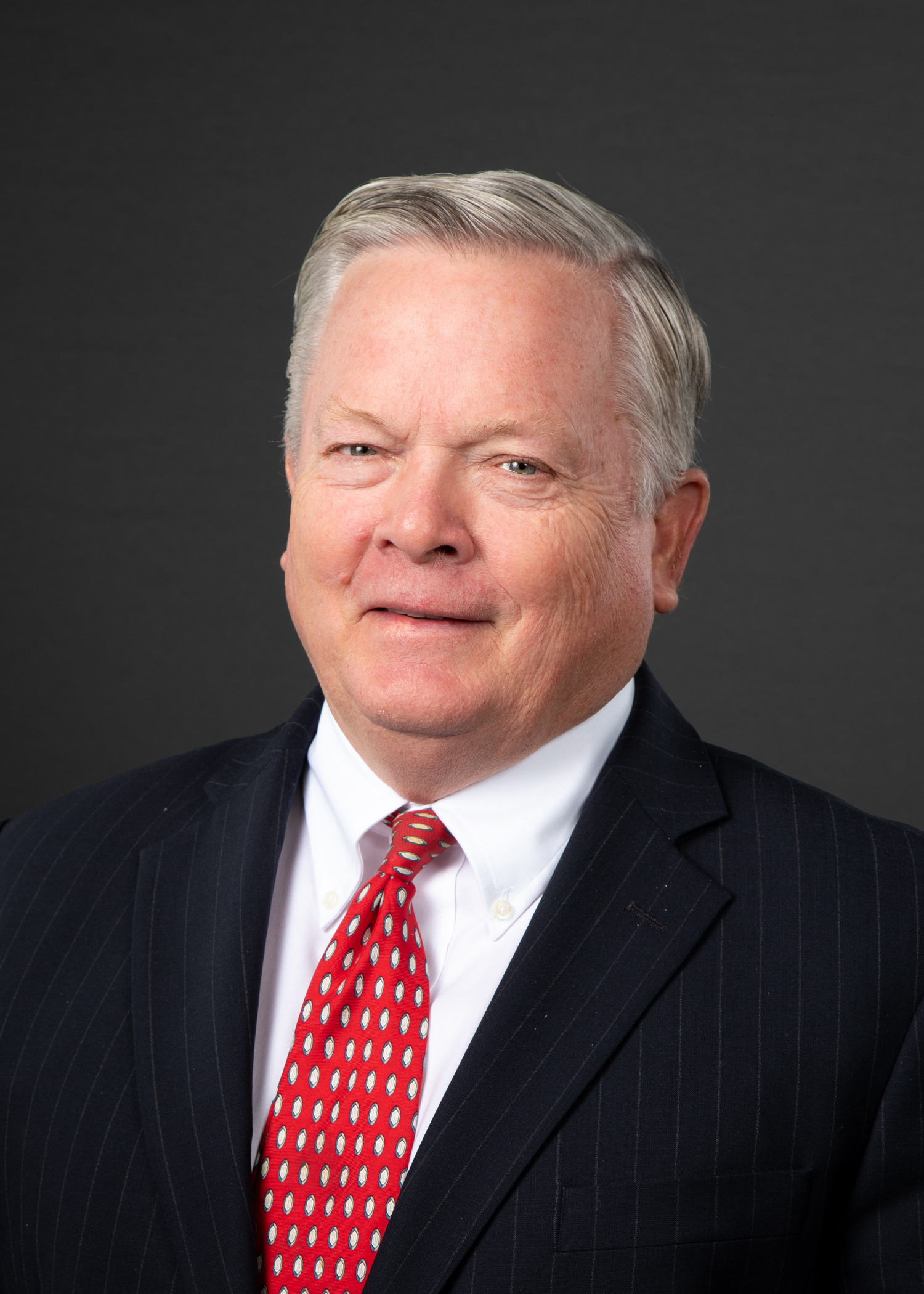

Member of the Iowa House of Representatives from the 56th district
- Incumbent
- Assumed office January 9, 2023
- Preceded by: Anne Osmundson (redistricting)

Personal details
- Born: 1955 (age 70–71) Clarion, Iowa, U.S.
- Party: Republican
- Spouse: Jacquelyn
- Children: 2
- Education: Buena Vista University (BA)
- Occupation: Farmer, substitute teacher

Mark I. Thompson (born 1955) is an American politician, harvest worker, former Marine and former counterterrorism coordinator who has represented the 56th district of the Iowa House of Representatives since January 2023, which consists of Humboldt County, Hancock County and most of Wright County, with the exception of parts of its southeast.

== Early life ==
Thompson was born in 1955 in Clarion, Iowa, and was raised on a farm near Eagle Grove, Iowa. He received a Bachelor of Arts from Buena Vista University and attended the Command and Staff College at Marine Corps University.

== Political career ==
Following decennial redistricting in 2021, Thompson announced his intent to run for the open 56th district seat in the Iowa House of Representatives in January 2022. He was endorsed by Minnesota representative Michele Bachmann in May 2022. He won the Republican primaries with over 65 percent of the vote on June 7, 2022, and defeated Libertarian Charles Aldrich in the general election on November 8 by over 64 points.

In 2024, Thompson filed to run for reelection. He won the Republican primaries unopposed on June 4, 2024, and will face Democrat Kyle Kruse in the general election on November 5, 2024.

Thompson currently serves on the Environmental Protection, Local Government, and Natural Resources committees.

Thompson has said that his priorities include education, election integrity, illegal immigration and narrowing the influence of the federal government. He opposes abortion and supports the Second Amendment. In March 2023, he, along with 7 other Republican representatives, introduced a bill that would ban same-sex marriage in Iowa.

== Personal life ==
Thompson has a wife, Jacquelyn, two children, and six grandchildren. He resides outside of Clarion, Iowa. He works as a substitute teacher and as a harvest worker in the fall.

Thompson served in the United States Marine Corps for twenty years, and served 18 years in various counterterrorism positions within the United States federal civil service for the Department of State Bureau of Counterterrorism and Countering Violent Extremism. He often led Foreign Emergency Support Team missions and was deployed to over 60 countries. In 2013 he testified before the United States House Committee on Oversight and Accountability regarding the 2012 Benghazi attack.

== Electoral history ==
Election	Political result	Candidate	Party	Votes	%
Iowa House of Representatives Republican primary elections, 2022; District 56; Turnout: 3,147	Republican (newly redistricted)	Mark Thompson	Republican	2,051	65.2
Iowa House of Representatives Republican primary elections, 2022; District 56; Turnout: 3,147	Republican (newly redistricted)	James L. Nelson	Republican	1,089	34.6
Iowa House of Representatives Republican primary elections, 2022; District 56; Turnout: 3,147	Republican (newly redistricted)	Other/Write-in votes		7	0.2
Iowa House of Representatives general elections, 2022; District 56; Turnout: 11,320	Republican (newly redistricted)	Mark Thompson	Republican	9,309	82.2
Iowa House of Representatives general elections, 2022; District 56; Turnout: 11,320	Republican (newly redistricted)	Charles Aldrich	Libertarian	1,986	17.5
Iowa House of Representatives general elections, 2022; District 56; Turnout: 11,320	Republican (newly redistricted)	Other/Write-in votes		25	0.2
