= Ginger Crocker =

American politician

Member of South Carolina House of Representatives for Laurens County
- In office 1978–1984

Personal details
- Party: Democratic
- Education: Columbia College

Virginia "Ginger" Leaman Crocker is an American politician. She is a Democrat and represented Laurens County on the South Carolina House of Representatives from 1978 to 1984. She endorsed Martin O'Malley's campaign in the 2016 US presidential election. She endorsed Joe Biden's presidential campaign in the 2020 presidential election.
