= Paul Shomshor =

American politician

Paul C. Shomshor, Jr.
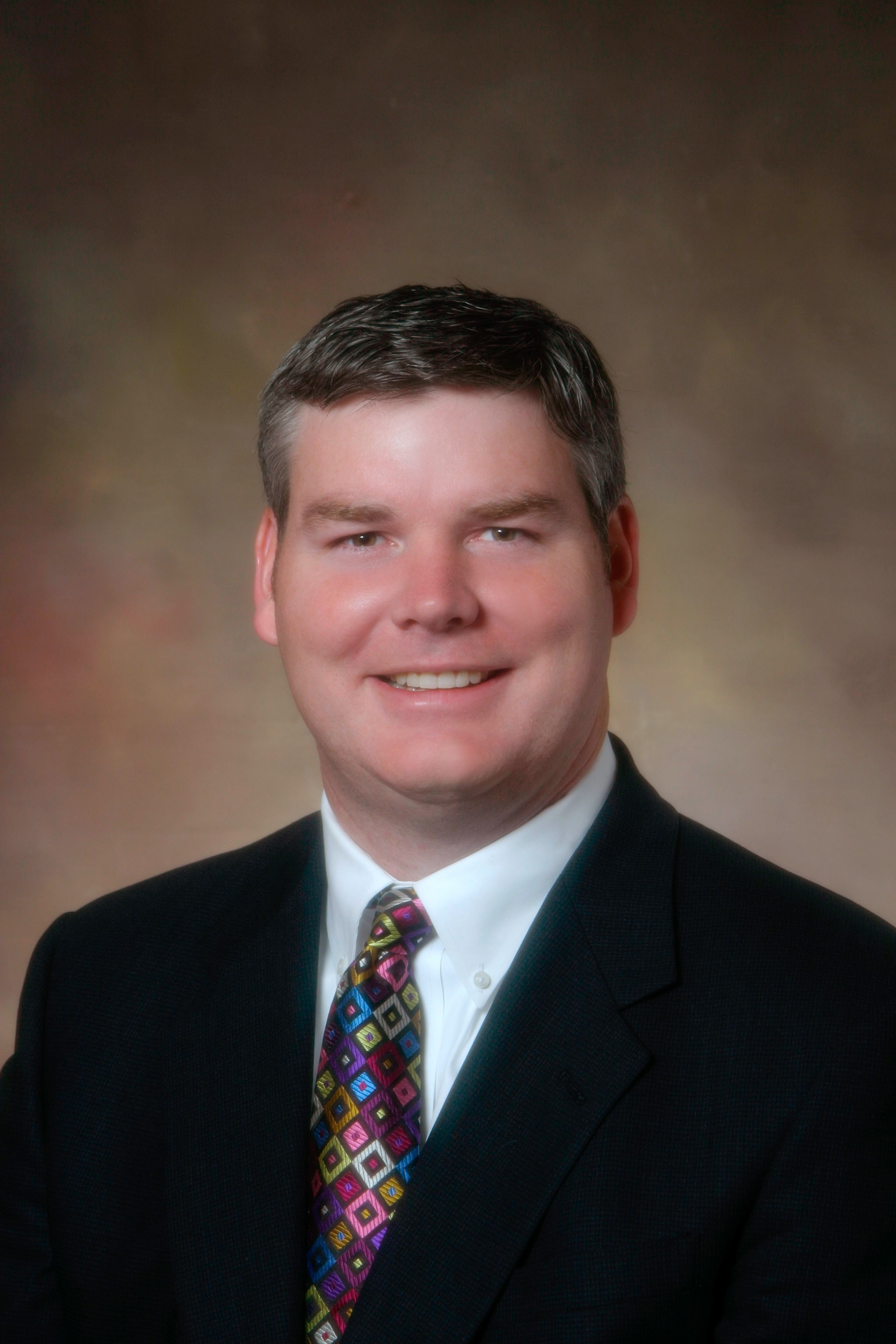

Member of the Iowa House of Representatives from the 100th district
- In office December 12, 2003 – January 9, 2011
- Preceded by: Brad Hansen
- Succeeded by: Mark Brandenburg

Personal details
- Born: April 10, 1967 (age 59) Council Bluffs, Iowa
- Party: Democratic
- Education: Baylor University
- Website: Shomshor's website

Paul C. Shomshor, Jr. (born April 10, 1967) is a former Iowa State Representative from the 100th District. He served in the Iowa House of Representatives from 2003, when he was elected in a special election, until 2011. He received his BA and MA from Baylor University.

During his last term in the Iowa House, Shomshor served on the Agriculture, Commerce, and (until November 9, 2009) State Government committees. He also served as the chair of the Ways and Means Committee and as a member of the Health and Human Services Appropriations Subcommittee. His prior political experience includes serving on the Council Bluffs City Council from 1997–2001 and running for the United States House of Representatives in 2002.

== Electoral history ==
In 2002, Shomshor ran for Iowa's 5th congressional district, following the 2002 redistricting and Republican Greg Ganske's decision to leave the House and run for the United States Senate. He lost the election to Republican opponent and then-State Senator Steve King. He won election to the Iowa House in an August 5, 2003 special election for the vacancy in the 100th District left when Republican Brad Hansen resigned to attend law school. He won the election, defeating Republican opponent Steve Cates. Shomshor left the house in 2011 after losing re-election in 2010 to Republican Mark Brandenburg.

*incumbent

Election	Political result	Candidate	Party	Votes	%
United States House of Representatives elections, 2002; District 5 Turnout: 182,237	Republican (newly redistricted)	Steve King	Republican	113,257	62.1
United States House of Representatives elections, 2002; District 5 Turnout: 182,237	Republican (newly redistricted)	Paul Shomshor	Republican	68,853	37.8
Iowa House of Representatives special election, 2003; District 100; Turnout: 3,995	Democratic gain from Republican	Paul Shomshor	Democratic	2,339	58.5
Iowa House of Representatives special election, 2003; District 100; Turnout: 3,995	Democratic gain from Republican	Steve Cates	Republican	1,648	41.3
Iowa House of Representatives elections, 2004; District 100; Turnout: 11,187	Democratic hold	Paul Shomshor*	Democratic	6,757	60.4
Iowa House of Representatives elections, 2004; District 100; Turnout: 11,187	Democratic hold	Patrick Tarr	Republican	4,406	39.4
Iowa House of Representatives elections, 2006; District 100; Turnout: 6,890	Democratic hold	Paul Shomshor*	Democratic	3,568	51.8
Iowa House of Representatives elections, 2006; District 100; Turnout: 6,890	Democratic hold	Scott A. Belt	Republican	3,211	46.6
Iowa House of Representatives elections, 2008; District 100; Turnout: 11,875	Democratic hold	Paul Shomshor*	Democratic	6,208	52.3
Iowa House of Representatives elections, 2008; District 100; Turnout: 11,875	Democratic hold	Scott A. Belt	Republican	5,653	47.6
Iowa House of Representatives elections, 2010; District 100; Turnout: 7,156	Republican gain from Democratic	Mark A. Brandenburg	Republican	3,699	51.7
Iowa House of Representatives elections, 2010; District 100; Turnout: 7,156	Republican gain from Democratic	Paul Shomshor*	Democratic	3,287	45.9

Iowa House of Representatives
Preceded by Brad Hansen	100th District; 2003 – 2011	Succeeded by Mark Brandenburg
