= Conrad Raymond Fisher =

American politician (1907–2004)

Member of the Iowa House of Representatives from the 54th district
- In office 1959–1971

Member of the Iowa House of Representatives from the 56th district
- In office 1971–1973

Member of the Iowa House of Representatives from the 44th district
- In office 1973–1975

Personal details
- Born: July 13, 1907
- Died: November 14, 2004 (aged 97)
- Party: Republican
- Education: Grand Junction Consolidated High School

Conrad Raymond Fisher (July 13, 1907 – November 14, 2004) was an American politician. He served as a Republican member of the Iowa House of Representatives.

== Life and career ==
Fisher attended Grand Junction Consolidated High School.

Fisher served in the Iowa House of Representatives from 1959 to 1975.

Fisher died on November 14, 2004, at the age of 97.
