= Patti Ruff =

American politician (born 1972)

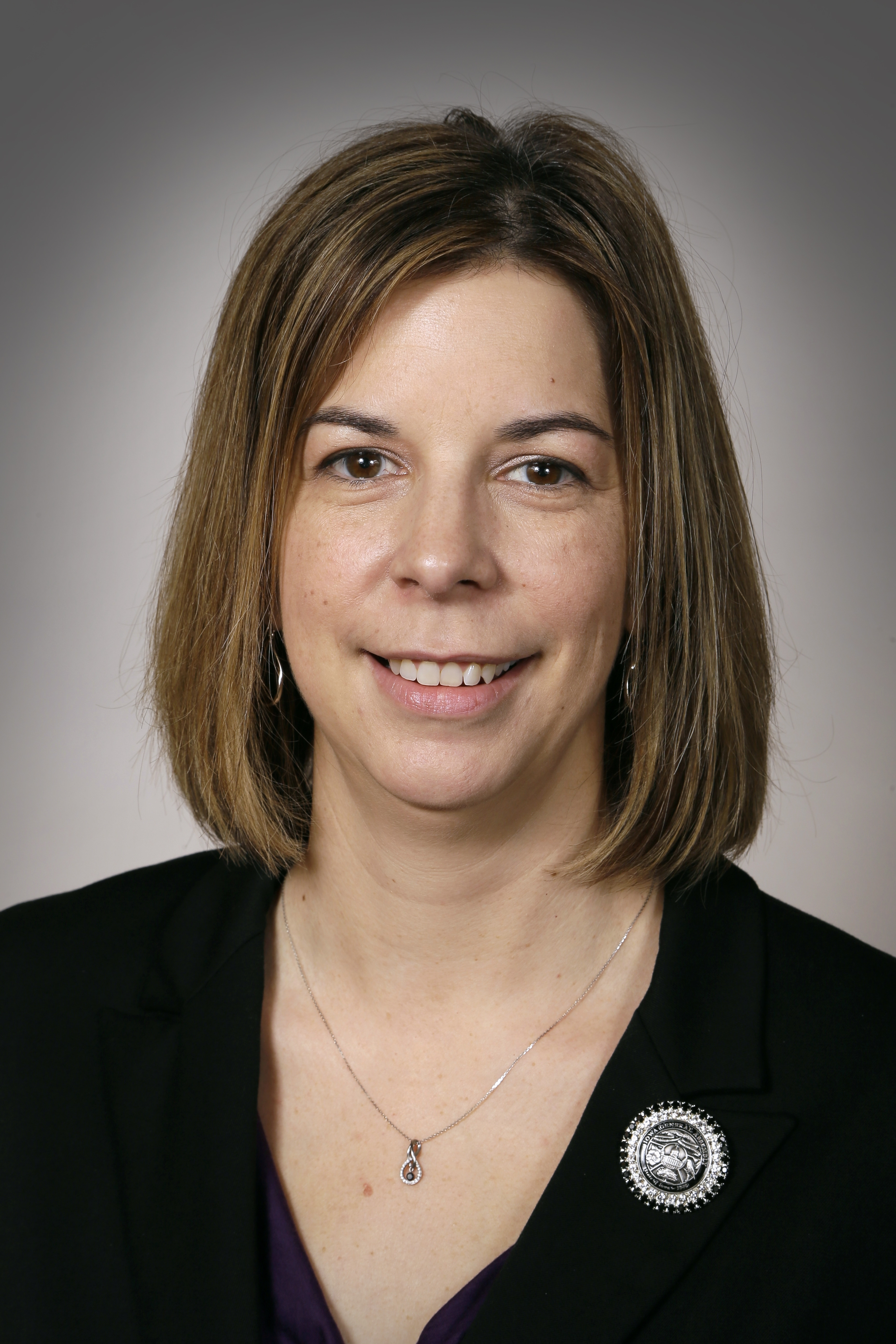

Member of the Iowa House of Representatives from the 56th district
- In office January 14, 2013 – January 8, 2017
- Preceded by: Matt Windschitl
- Succeeded by: Kristi Hager

Personal details
- Born: 1972 (age 53–54) Richardson, Texas, U.S.
- Party: Democratic
- Spouse: Dan
- Children: 3 sons
- Education: Loras College
- Website: legis.iowa.gov/...

Patti Ruff (born 1972) is a former Democratic member of the Iowa House of Representatives, representing the 56th district. Before serving in the legislature, Ruff worked for Bunge North American, helping farmers sell and transport grain down the Mississippi River. She lost her seat in the 2016 general election.

In a 2022 interview with NBC news, Ruff stated that the reason she lost her re-election bid was because she "had a D next to her name" on the ballot, and her opponent ran an ad with Ruff standing with Hillary Clinton.

== Personal life ==
Ruff was born in Richardson, Texas, and raised in McGregor, Iowa. She graduated from MarMac High School and earned a degree in history from Loras College. Ruff and her husband Dan have three sons.
