= Charlie McConkey =

American politician (born 1955)

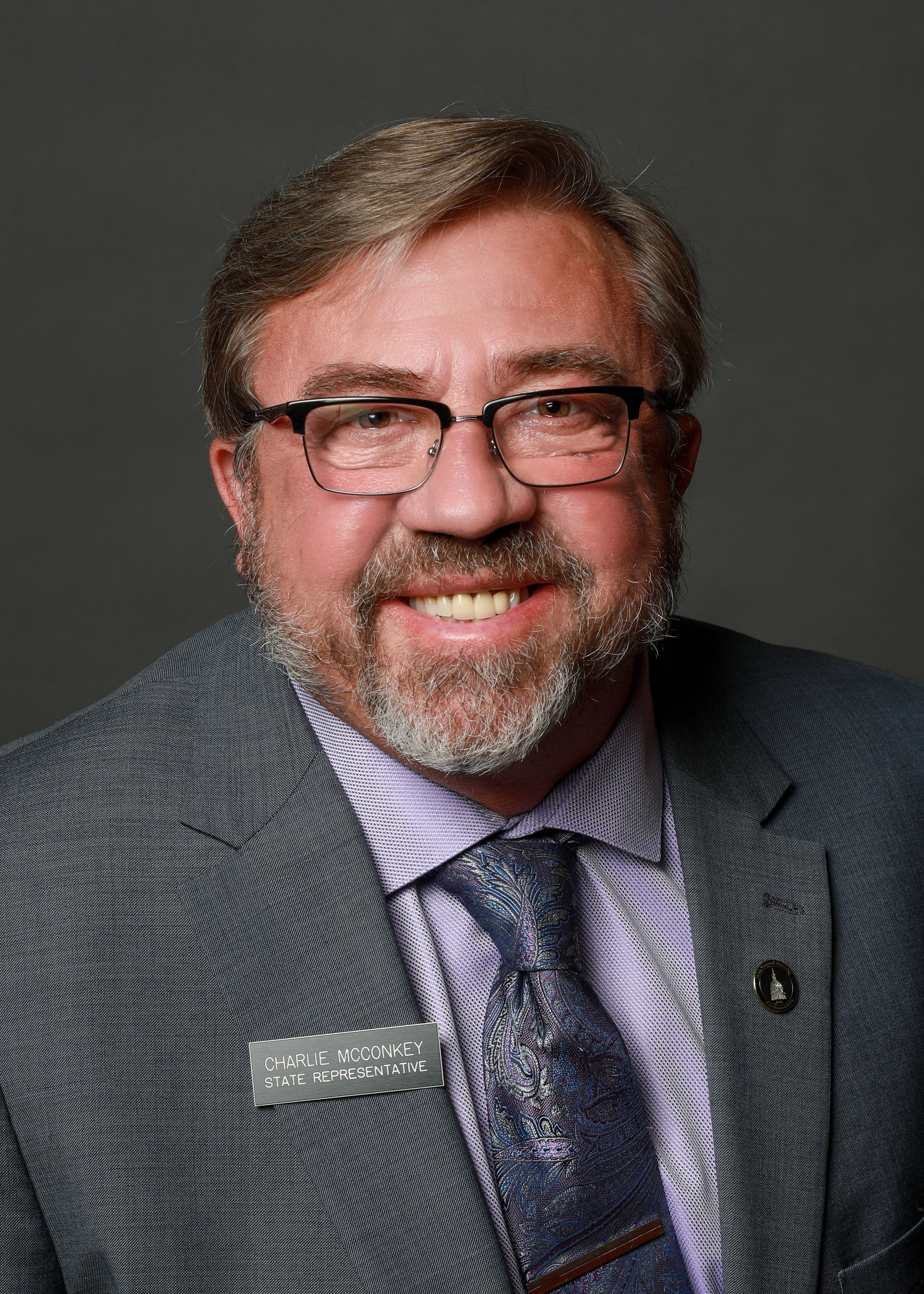
- McConkey in 2021

Member of the Iowa House of Representatives from the 15th district
- In office January 12, 2015 – January 9, 2023
- Preceded by: Mark Brandenburg
- Succeeded by: Matt Windschitl (redistricted)

Personal details
- Born: 1955 (age 70–71) Carter Lake, Iowa, U.S.
- Party: Democratic
- Spouse: Sheryl
- Children: Jennifer, Charlie III, Jason, Katie
- Profession: retired steelworker
- Website: legis.iowa.gov/...

Charlie McConkey (born 1955) is an American politician who is a former Democratic member of the Iowa House of Representatives from the 15th district. McConkey was first elected in 2014 to replace retiring Republican Representative Mark Brandenburg. He left office in 2023.

McConkey endorsed former Maryland governor Martin O'Malley for the Democratic nomination in the 2016 presidential election.

== Electoral history ==
Election	Political result	Candidate	Party	Votes	%
Iowa House of Representatives elections, 2014; District 15; Turnout: 6,077	Democratic pickup	Charlie McConkey	Democratic	3,069	50.50%
Iowa House of Representatives elections, 2014; District 15; Turnout: 6,077	Democratic pickup	John Blue	Republican	2,994	49.27%
Iowa House of Representatives elections, 2014; District 15; Turnout: 6,077	Democratic pickup	Write-In		14	0.23%
Iowa House of Representatives elections, 2016; District 15; Turnout: 10,497	Democratic hold	Charlie McConkey	Democratic	5,424	51.67%
Iowa House of Representatives elections, 2016; District 15; Turnout: 10,497	Democratic hold	Bill Riley	Republican	5,056	48.17%
Iowa House of Representatives elections, 2016; District 15; Turnout: 10,497	Democratic hold	Write-In		17	0.16%

Iowa House of Representatives
Preceded by Mark Brandenburg	15th District; 2015–2023	Succeeded by Matt Windschitl
