= Paul Wilderdyke =

American politician (1942–2025)

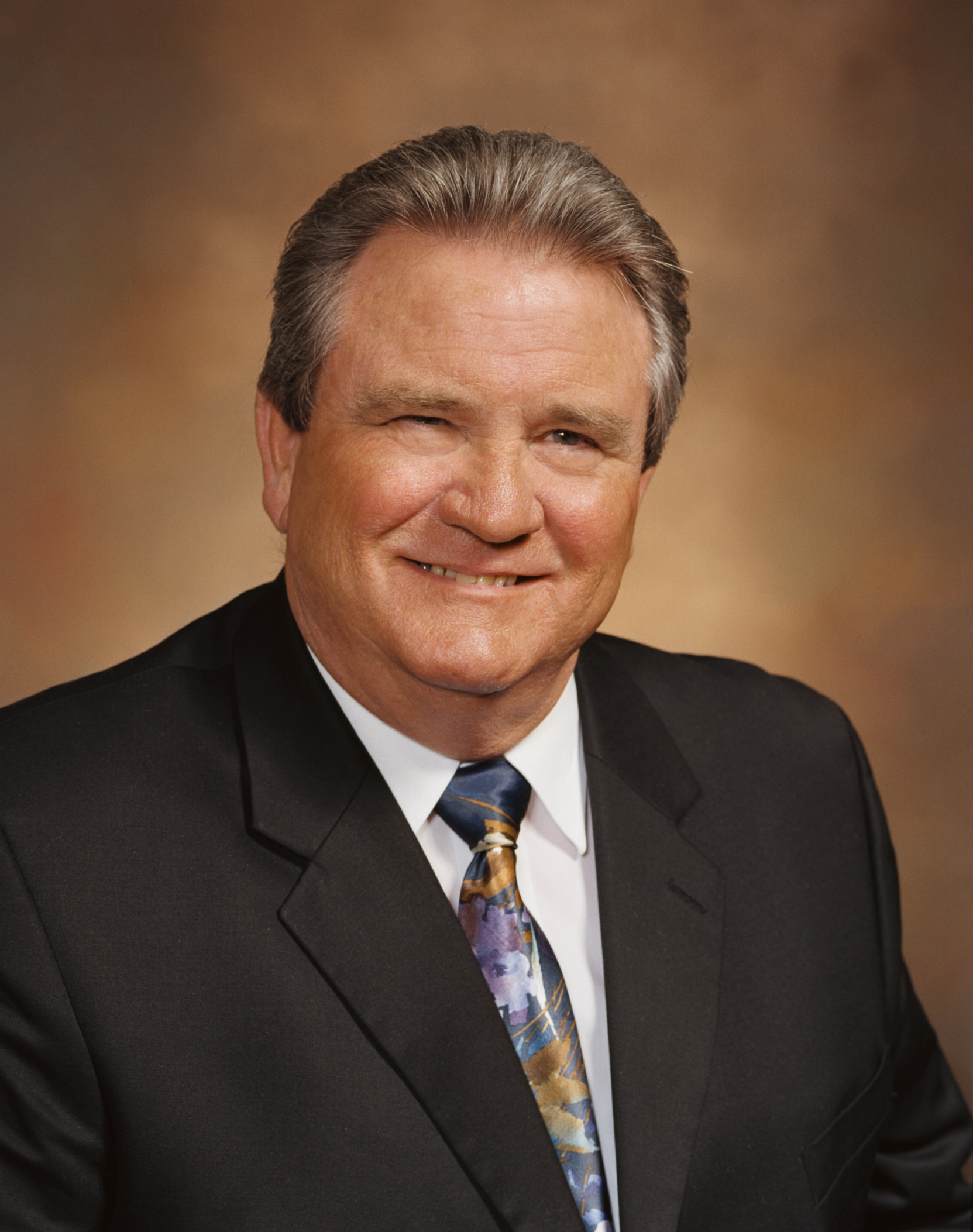
- 79th General Assembly portrait (2001)

Member of the Iowa House of Representatives from the 65th district 81st (2001–2003)
- In office November 6, 2001 – January 7, 2007
- Preceded by: Jerry Welter
- Succeeded by: Matt Windschitl

Personal details
- Born: June 18, 1942 Kansas City, Kansas, U.S.
- Died: February 11, 2025 (aged 82)
- Party: Republican
- Spouse: Janet
- Children: 3
- Occupation: Community Relations Manager, digital systems engineer

Paul Andrew Wilderdyke (June 18, 1942 – February 11, 2025) was an American politician who served as a member of the Iowa House of Representatives from 2001 to 2007. He was born in Kansas City, Kansas, and raised in Grinnell, Iowa. He served in the United States Navy for 20 years. A Republican, he was defeated in the 2006 primary. Wilderdyke died on February 11, 2025, at the age of 82.
