= Jason Sherer =

American politician

Member of the Iowa House of Representatives from the 15th district
- Member-elect
- Assumed office January 1, 2027
- Preceded by: Matt Windschitl

Personal details
- Party: Republican
- Website: shererstatehouse.com

Jason Sherer is an American politician. A member of the Republican Party, he was elected to the Iowa House of Representatives in 2026, representing the 15th district. He succeeded fellow Republican Matt Windschitl in the 2026 election.
