= Kristi Hager =

American politician (born 1963)

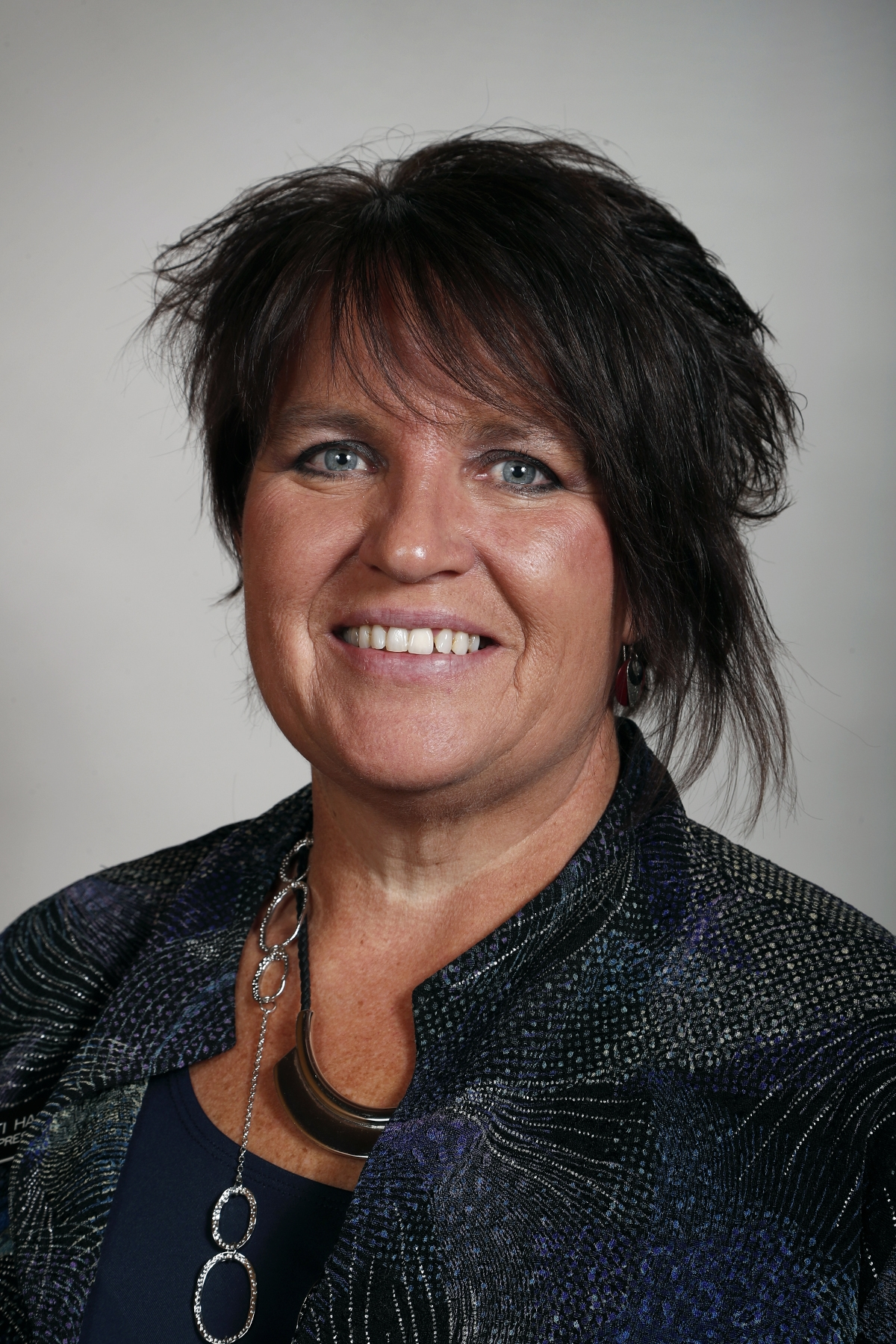

Member of the Iowa House of Representatives from the 56th district
- In office January 9, 2017 – January 13, 2019
- Preceded by: Patti Ruff
- Succeeded by: Anne Osmundson

Personal details
- Born: November 9, 1963 (age 62)
- Party: Republican
- Spouse: Bob
- Education: University of Dubuque
- Profession: Nurse

Kristi Hager (born November 9, 1963) is a former member of the Iowa House of Representatives from the Iowa House, District 56. A resident of Waukon, she has served as a Republican in the Iowa House of Representatives since January 2017. Hager has lived much of her life in Allamakee County, Iowa.

Hager served on the following committees in the Iowa House of Representatives: Education, Local Government (Vice Chair), Public Safety, and Transportation.

In February 2018, she announced she would not seek reelection and left office in January 2019 when her term ended.
