= Matt Windschitl =

American politician from Iowa

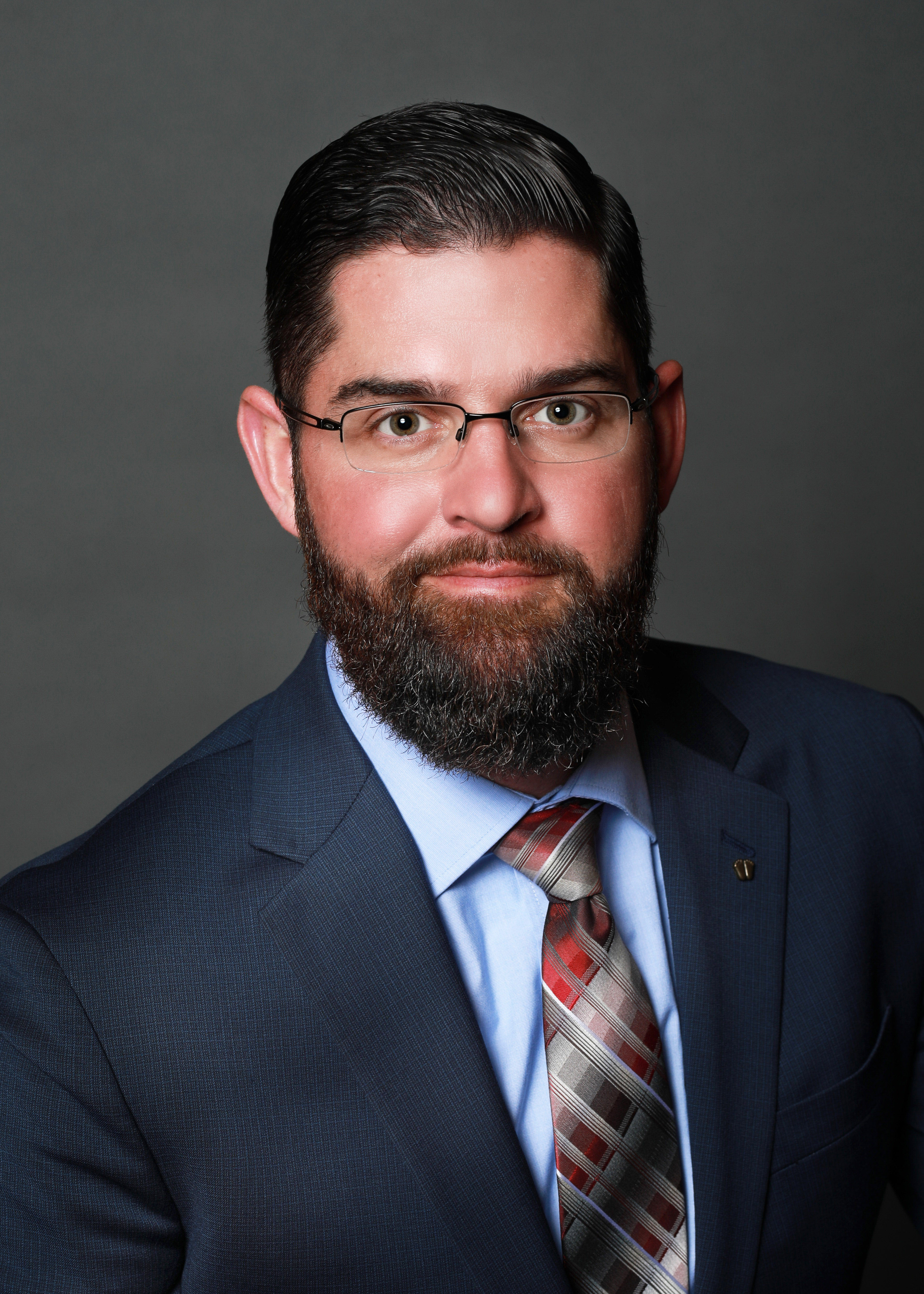
- Official portrait, 2021

Majority Leader of the Iowa House of Representatives
- In office January 13, 2020 – August 4, 2025
- Preceded by: Chris Hagenow
- Succeeded by: Bobby Kaufmann

Speaker pro tempore of the Iowa House of Representatives
- In office April 30, 2014 – January 13, 2020
- Preceded by: Steven Olson
- Succeeded by: John Wills

Member of the Iowa House of Representatives
- Incumbent
- Assumed office January 8, 2007
- Preceded by: Paul Wilderdyke
- Succeeded by: Jason Sherer (elect)
- Constituency: 56th district (2007–2013); 17th district (2013–2023); 15th district (2023–2027)

Personal details
- Born: December 30, 1983 (age 42) Marshalltown, Iowa, U.S.
- Party: Republican
- Spouse: Divorced 2024
- Children: 2
- Education: Colorado School of Trades

Military service
- Allegiance: United States
- Branch/service: United States Marine Corps
- Years of service: 2001–2009
- Rank: Sergeant
- Unit: United States Marine Corps Reserve
- Battles/wars: Iraq War

Matt W. Windschitl (born December 30, 1983) is an American politician and businessman serving as a member of the Iowa House of Representatives from the 15th District.

== Early life and education ==
Born in 1983 in Marshalltown, Iowa, Windschitl studied gunsmithing at the Colorado School of Trades.

== Career ==
A Republican, he has served in the Iowa House of Representatives since 2007. Windschitl now works for Revelton Distilling Company in Osceola, Iowa. Previously he has worked as a conductor for the Union Pacific Railroad and as a gunsmith.

Windschitl is a member of the United States Marine Corps Reserve and served a six-month tour in Iraq.

Windschitl was elected by his caucus to serve as House Majority Leader in 2019. Previously, he served as the Speaker Pro Tempore and served on several committees in the Iowa House: Judiciary, Local Government, Veterans Affairs, and Ways and Means committees. He served as Majority Leader until August 2025.

== U.S. House Campaign ==
In July 2025, Windschitl announced his run for the Iowa's 4th congressional district in the 2026 United States House of Representatives elections.

Iowa House of Representatives
Preceded by Steven Olson	Speaker pro tempore of the Iowa House of Representatives; 2014–2020	Succeeded by John Wills
Preceded by Chris Hagenow	Majority Leader of the Iowa House of Representatives; 2020–2025	Succeeded by Bobby Kaufmann
