= Bruce Bearinger =

American politician

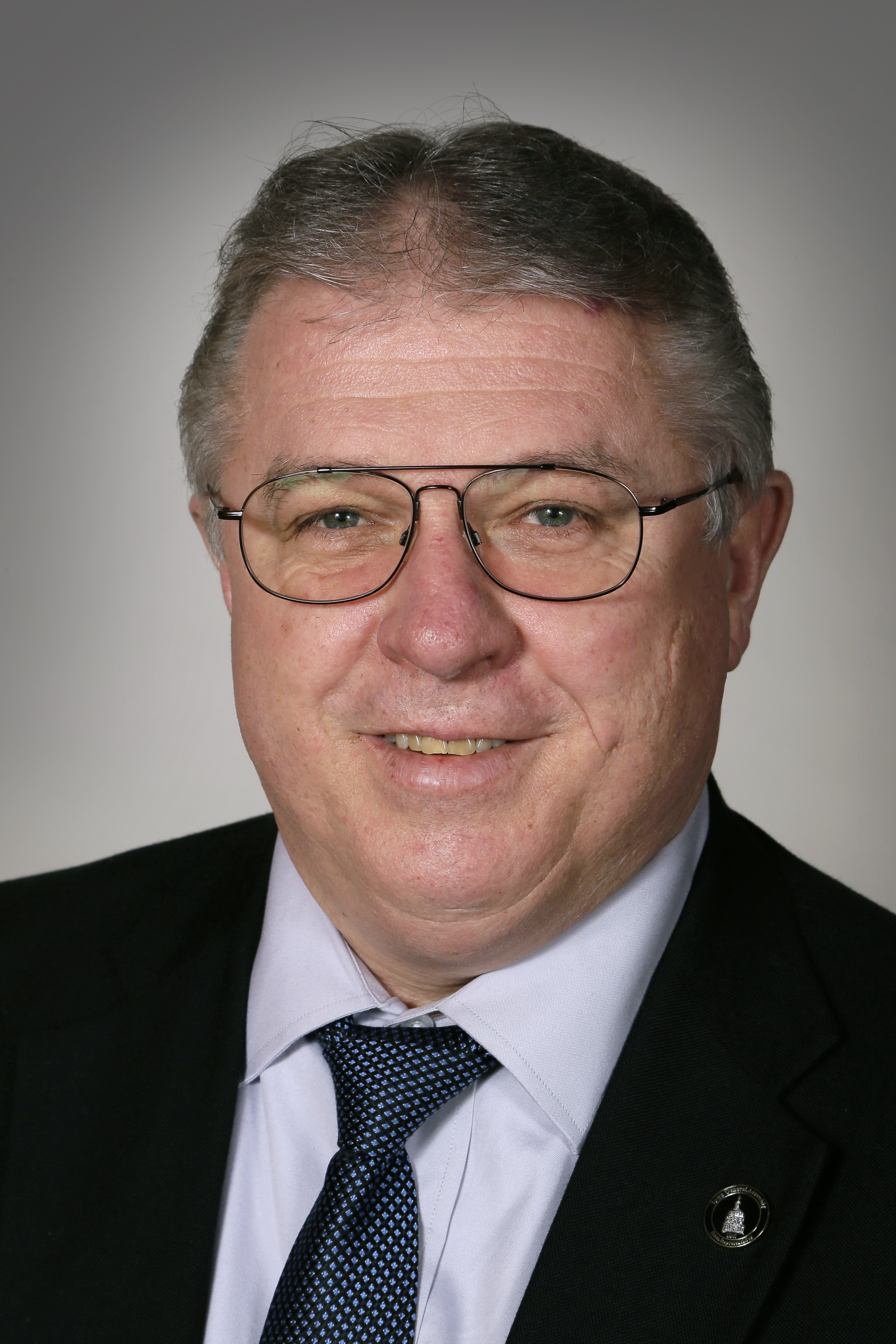

Member of the Iowa House of Representatives from the 64th district
- In office January 14, 2013 – January 11, 2021
- Preceded by: Janet Petersen
- Succeeded by: Chad Ingels

Personal details
- Born: 1959 (age 66–67) Monticello, Iowa, U.S.
- Party: Democratic

Bruce Bearinger is an American politician, educator, and academic administrator who served as a member of the Iowa House of Representatives for the 64th district from 2013 to 2021. Elected in 2012, he assumed office on January 14, 2013.

== Career ==
Prior to entering politics, Bearinger worked as a biology and agriculture teacher. A resident of Oelwein, Iowa, he serve on the Oelwein City Council. He also served as the education director for Iowa State Extension in Buchanan County, Iowa.

Bearinger was a candidate for re-election in 2020, but withdrew from the race after accepting the role of dean of agriculture, animal science, and business technologies at Northeast Iowa Community College. During his tenure in the House, he served as the ranking member of the Agriculture Committee. During the 2020 Democratic Party presidential primaries, Bearinger endorsed Steve Bullock and Amy Klobuchar. In January 2020, Bearinger authored a guest opinion column in The Waterloo-Cedar Falls Courier.
