= Anne Osmundson =

American politician (born 1957)

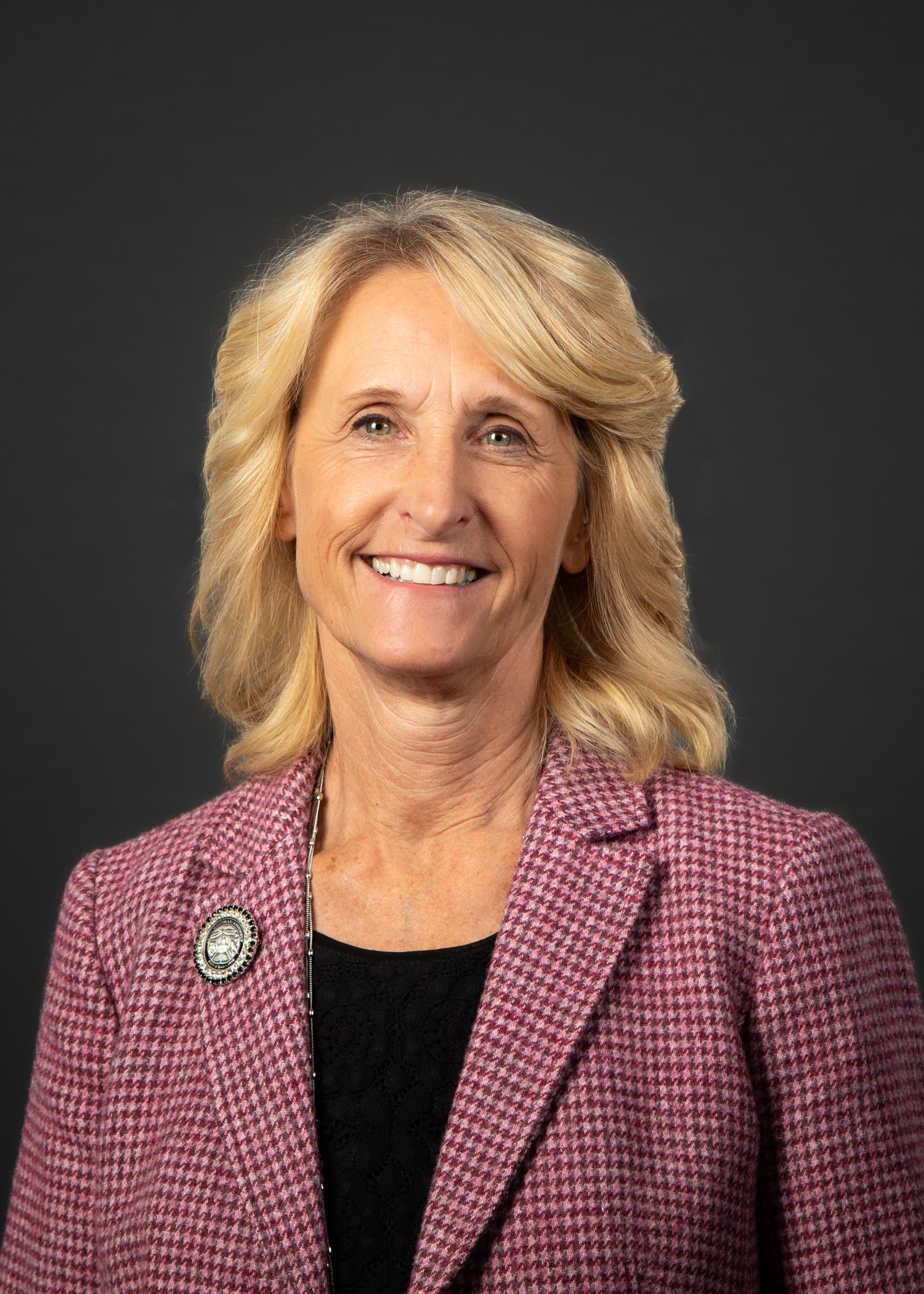

Member of the Iowa House of Representatives from the 64th district
- In office January 14, 2019 – January 13, 2025
- Preceded by: Kristi Hager
- Succeeded by: Jason Gearhart

Personal details
- Born: February 7, 1957 (age 69) McGregor, Iowa, U.S.
- Party: Republican
- Spouse: Steve
- Children: 7

Anne Osmundson (born February 7, 1957) is an American politician who served as a member of the Iowa House of Representatives from the 64th district. Elected in November 2018, she assumed office on January 14, 2019. She left office January 13, 2025.

== Early life and education ==
Osmundson was born in McGregor, Iowa and raised in Volga, Iowa. She graduated from Central High School in Elkader, Iowa.

== Career ==
Osmundson served as secretary of the Clayton County Republican Party. She was also a member of the Clayton County Planning and Zoning Commission and Clayton County Judicial Magistrate Appointing Commission. Prior to her own election to the House, Osmundson served as a clerk to Representative Kristi Hager for two years. Osmundson was elected to the Iowa House of Representatives in November 2018 and assumed office on January 14, 2019. She served as chair of the House Ethics Committee. She declined to run for re-election in 2024.

Iowa House of Representatives
Preceded by Chad Ingels	64th District; 2023 – 2025	Succeeded by Jason Gearhart
Preceded by Kristi Hager	56th District; 2019 – 2023	Succeeded by Mark Thompson
