= Luther V. Carter =

American politician (1879–1929)

Speaker of the Iowa House of Representatives
- In office January 10, 1927 – January 13, 1929
- Preceded by: Billy Edson
- Succeeded by: Joseph H. Johnson

Member of the Iowa House of Representatives from the 64th district
- In office January 10, 1921 – January 13, 1929

Personal details
- Born: January 30, 1879 near New Providence, Iowa, U.S.
- Died: December 31, 1929 (aged 50) New Providence, Iowa, U.S.
- Party: Republican
- Spouse: Myra L. Hadley (m. 1905)
- Children: 3
- Education: William Penn University
- Occupation: Politician

Luther V. Carter (January 30, 1879 – December 31, 1929) was an American politician.

Carter was born to parents James K. and Martha Ann Carter on January 30, 1879, and raised on the family farm near New Providence, Iowa. Carter played college football for the Penn Statesmen, after completing his education at the New Providence Academy. Upon graduating from William Penn University in 1904, Carter became principal of the Grant School in Oskaloosa, then taught at the Penn Academy.

Carter subsequently retired from teaching to farm in Lawn Hill, although he remained active in the education sector as a trustee of Penn College and member of the New Providence school board. Carter served the Hardin County Farm Bureau as its first president, and was among the first members in the county branch of the Cow Testing Association. In 1920, Carter won his first election to the Iowa House of Representatives as a Republican, and served continuously from January 10, 1921, to January 13, 1929, for District 64. During his final term in office, Carter served as Speaker of the House. Carter was frequently ill during his speakership, and died at home in New Providence on December 31, 1929.
