= Gordon Burke =

American politician in the state of Iowa

Gordon B. Burke

Member of the Iowa House of Representatives
- In office 1991–1995

Personal details
- Born: February 5, 1941 (age 85) Marshalltown, Iowa, U.S.
- Party: Democratic
- Occupation: tool and die maker

Gordon Brian Burke (born February 5, 1941) was an American politician in the state of Iowa.

Burke attended high school in Marshalltown, Iowa and was a tool and die maker. He served in the Iowa House of Representatives from 1991 to 1995, as a Democrat.
