= James F. Hahn =

American politician (born 1935)

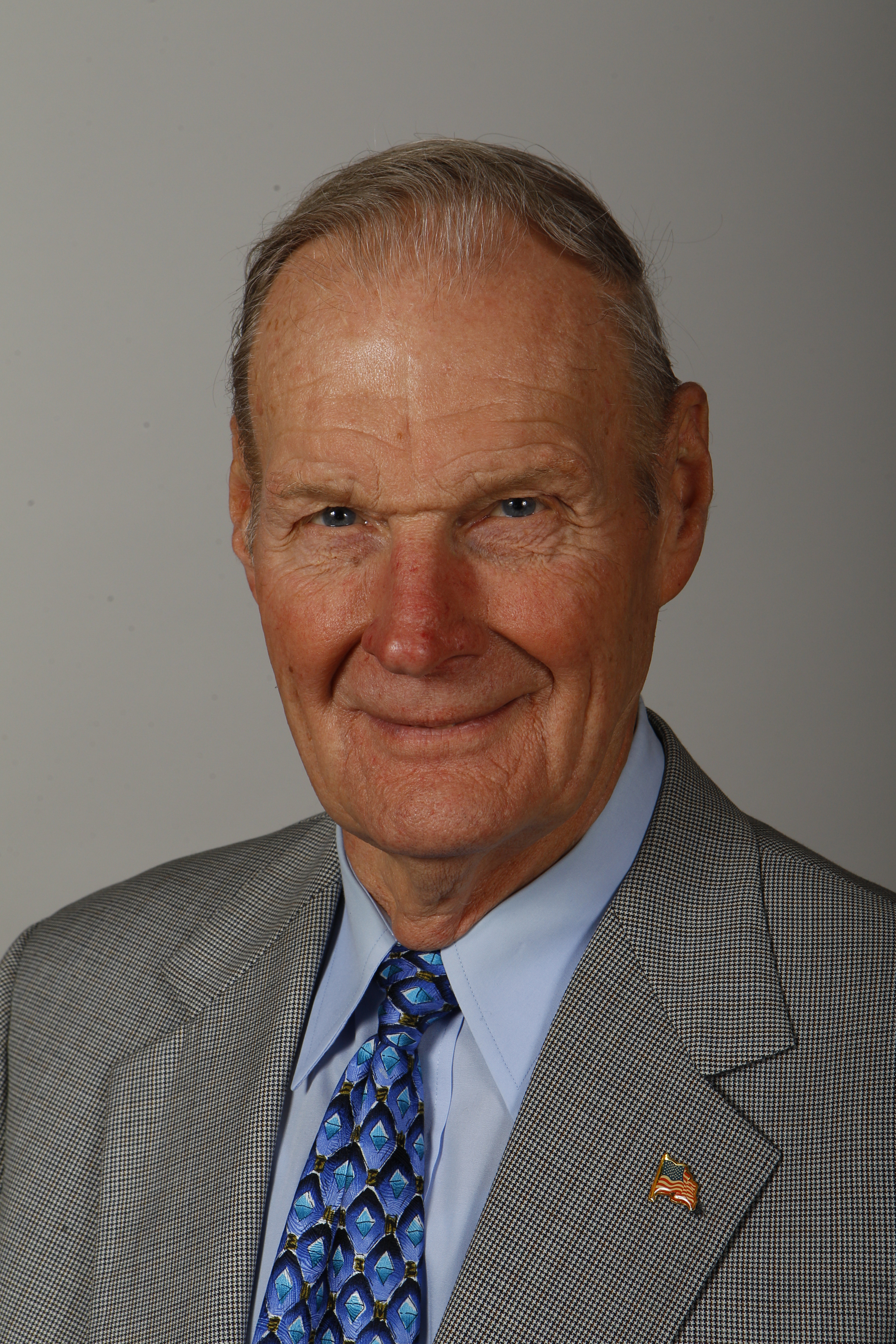
- Official portrait, 2011

Member of the Iowa Senate from the 40th district
- In office January 10, 2005 – January 13, 2013
- Preceded by: Richard Drake
- Succeeded by: Ken Rozenboom

Member of the Iowa House of Representatives from the 80th district
- In office January 13, 2003 – January 9, 2005
- Preceded by: Rod Roberts
- Succeeded by: Nathan Reichert

Member of the Iowa House of Representatives from the 48th district
- In office January 13, 1993 – January 12, 2003
- Preceded by: Darrell Hanson
- Succeeded by: Donovan Olson

Member of the Iowa House of Representatives from the 56th district
- In office January 14, 1991 – January 10, 1993
- Preceded by: Bill Trent
- Succeeded by: Jerry Welter

Personal details
- Born: October 25, 1935 (age 90) Muscatine, Iowa, U.S.
- Party: Republican
- Occupation: Property Management
- Website: Hahn's website

James F. Hahn (born October 25, 1935) was the Iowa State Senator from the 40th District. He served in the Iowa Senate since 2005. He received his diploma from Muscatine High School in 1953 and has worked as a real estate salesperson since 1989.

== Career ==
Hahn served on several committees in the Iowa Senate – the Appropriations committee; the Economic Growth committee; the Labor and Business Relations committee; and the State Government committee. He also served as the ranking member on the Administration and Regulation Appropriations Subcommittee. His prior political experience includes serving as a representative in the Iowa House from 1990 to 2004.

Hahn was elected in 2004 with 14,485 votes (54%), defeating Democratic opponent Thomas L. Fiegen.

Iowa Senate
| Preceded by Richard Drake | 40th District; 2005 – present | Succeeded by Incumbent |
