= John Connors (American politician) =

American politician (1922–2009)

John H. Connors
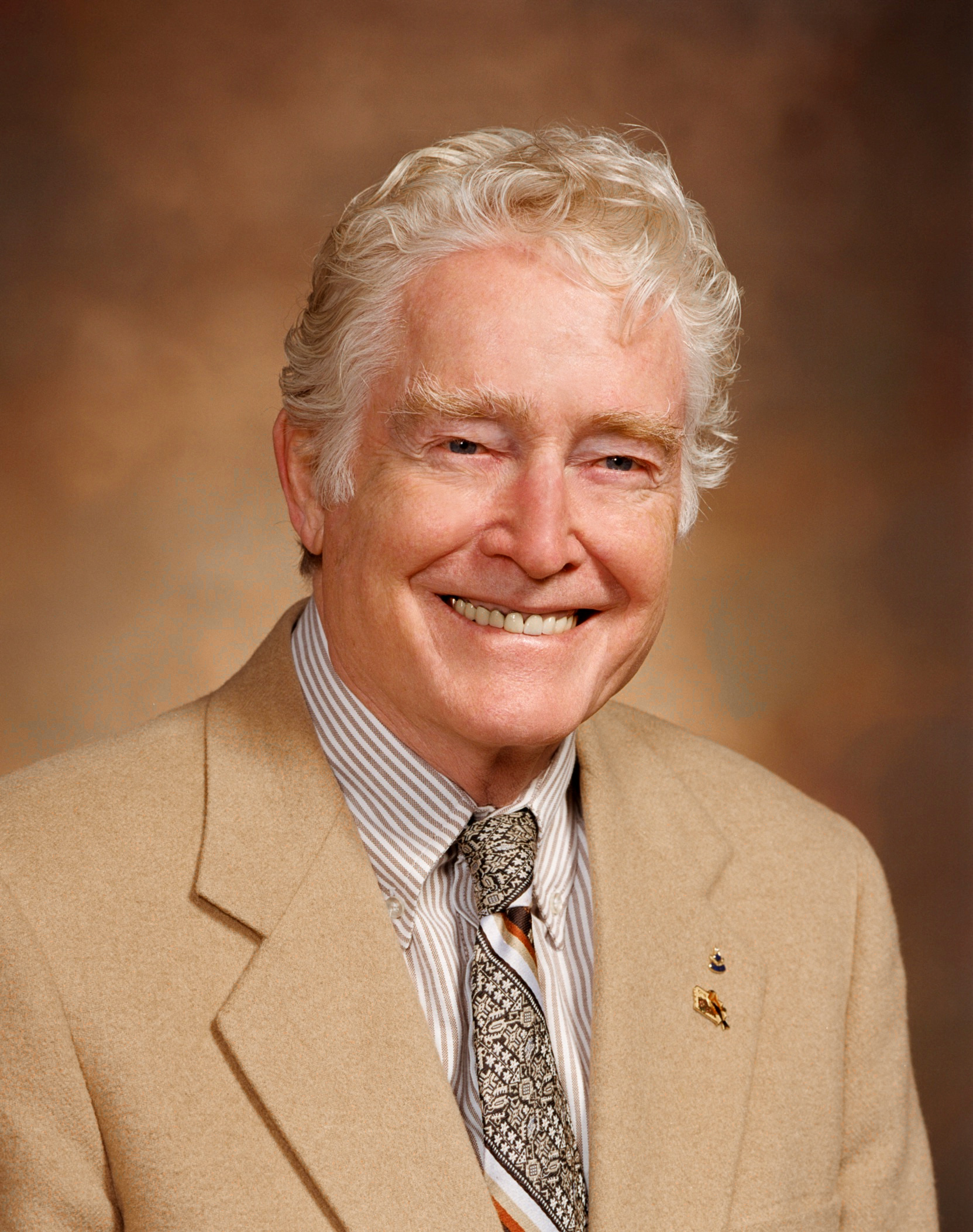

Member of the Iowa House of Representatives
- In office 1973–2005

Personal details
- Born: December 2, 1922 Des Moines, Iowa, U.S.
- Died: March 7, 2009 (aged 86) Des Moines, Iowa, U.S.
- Party: Democratic
- Spouse: Marjorie Leonard (m. 1945–2009)
- Occupation: firefighter

John H. Connors (December 2, 1922 – March 7, 2009) was an American politician in the state of Iowa. Connors was born in Des Moines, Iowa. He attended high school there, and then the Harvard University Trade Union Program. He served in World War II with the United States Navy Reserve. He was a firefighter in the Des Moines Fire Department. In 1945 he married Marjorie Leonard. He has four children. Connors served in the Iowa House of Representatives from 1973 to 2005 as a Democrat. He served the 64th district from 1973 to 1981, and the 68th district from 1981 to 2005. He died in Des Moines in 2009, at the age of 86.
