= Colorado School of Trades =

Gunsmithing school in Colorado, United States

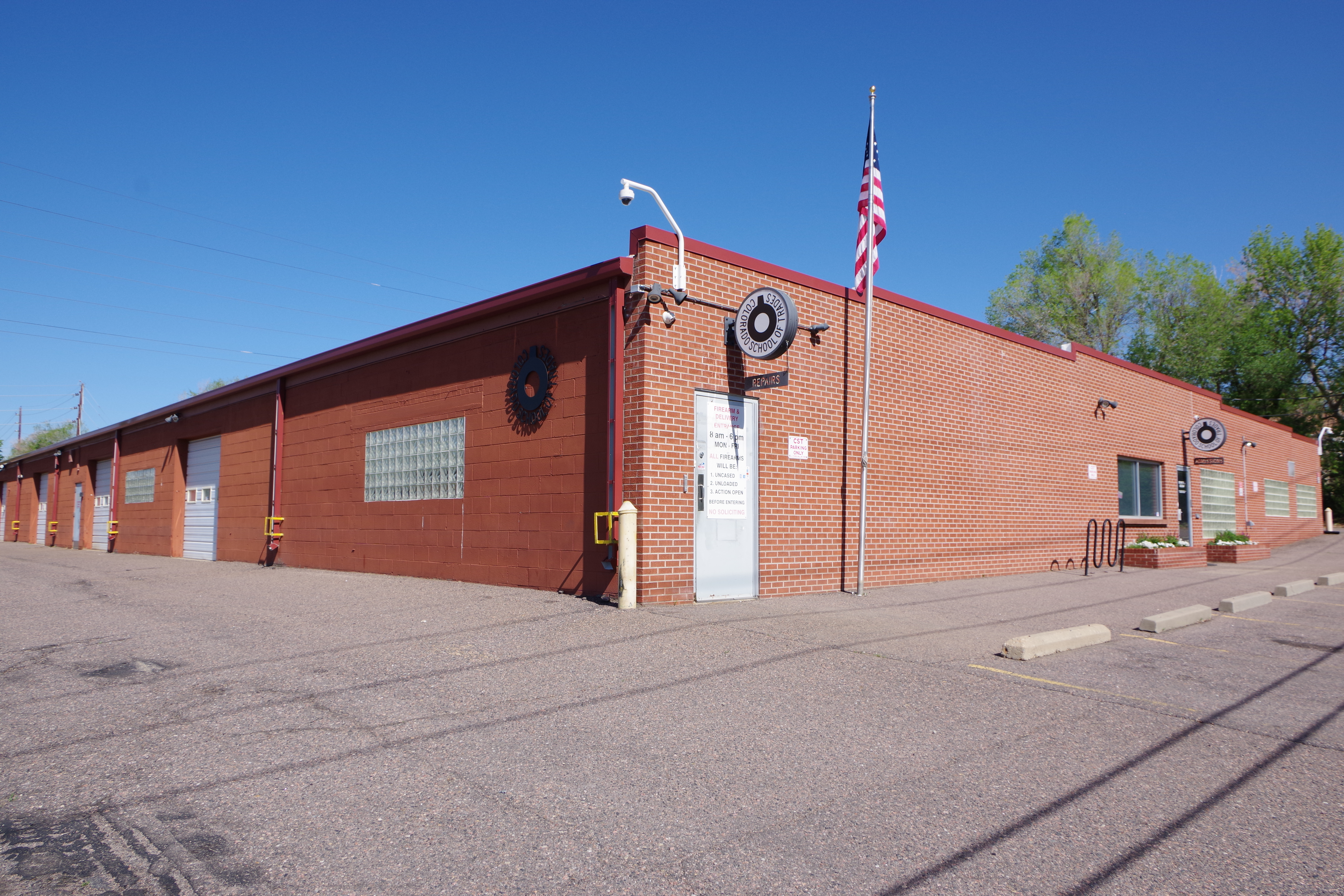
- Type: Private, for-profit trade school
- Established: 1947
- Students: 160 maximum
- Location: Lakewood, Colorado, United States; 39°44′31″N 105°06′14″W
- Website: schooloftrades.edu

The Colorado School of Trades is a private for-profit school in Lakewood, Colorado that focuses exclusively on gunsmithing. Graduates receive an Associate Degree. It was founded in 1947.
