= Mark Brandenburg (politician) =

American politician (born 1955)

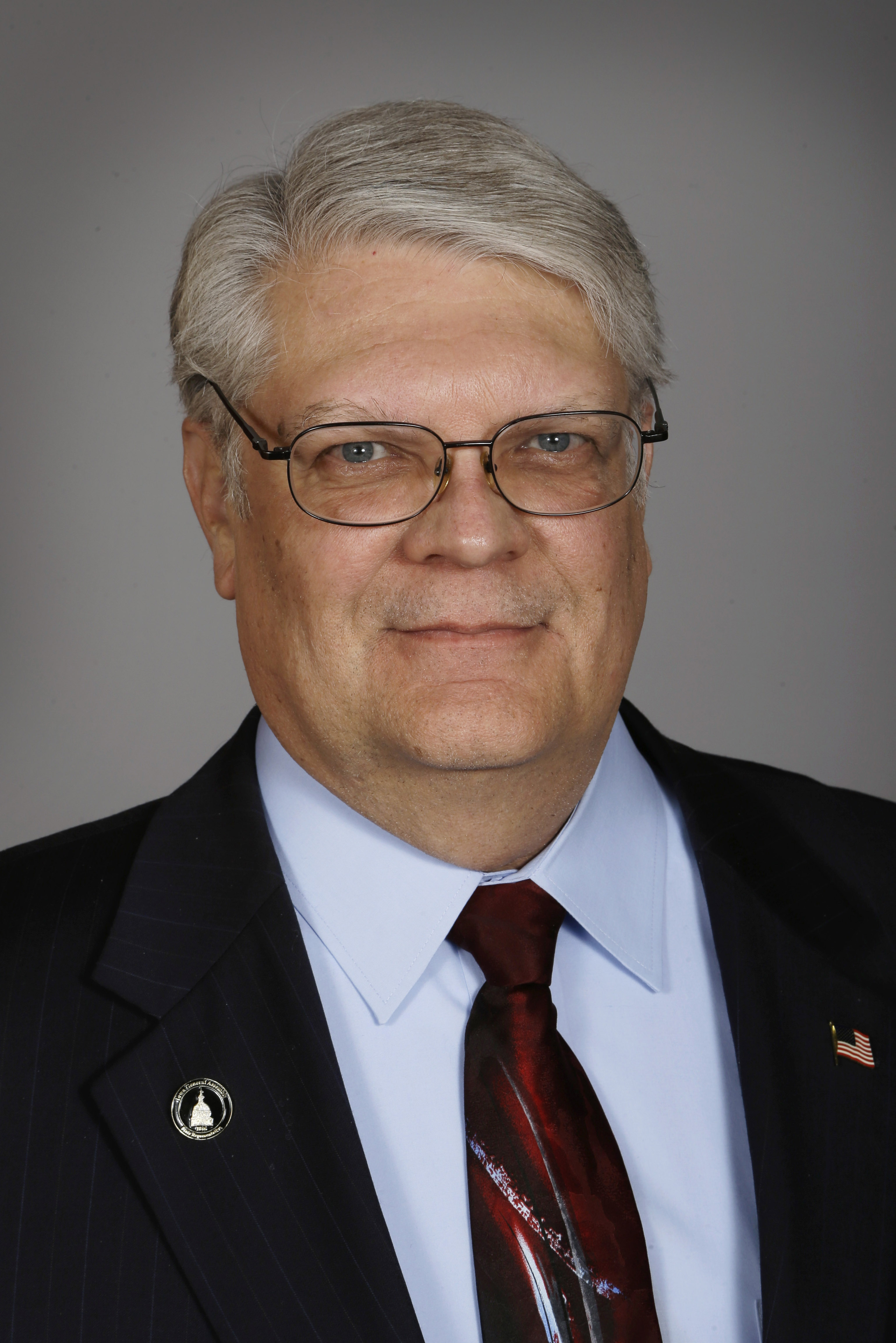

Member of the Iowa House of Representatives from the 15th district 100th (201 – 2013)
- In office January 10, 2011 – 2015
- Preceded by: Paul Shomshor
- Succeeded by: Charlie McConkey

Personal details
- Born: January 20, 1955 (age 71) Council Bluffs, Iowa
- Party: Republican
- Spouse: Debbie
- Children: 2
- Education: Iowa Western Community College; Bellevue University
- Occupation: Retired Adjunct Instructor for Iowa Western Community College
- Website: Brandenburg's website

Mark A. Brandenburg (born January 20, 1955) is an American former politician who was the Iowa State Representative from the 15th District. A Republican, he served in the Iowa House of Representatives from 2011 to 2015. Brandenburg was born, raised, and resides in Council Bluffs, Iowa. He has an A.A. in mathematics from Iowa Western Community College, where he later taught, and a B.S. in human resource management from Bellevue University.

Brandenburg served on several committees in the Iowa House – the Judiciary, Public Safety, and Veterans Affairs committees. He also served as the vice chair of the Commerce committee and as a member of the Justice System Appropriations Subcommittee.

== Biography ==
Mark Brandenburg is a lifelong resident of Council Bluffs.

== Electoral history ==
*incumbent

Election	Political result	Candidate	Party	Votes	%
Iowa Senate primary elections, 2008; District 50	Republican	Mark A. Brandenburg	Republican	unopposed	
Iowa Senate general elections, 2008; District 50; Turnout: 24,204	Democratic hold	Michael E. Gronstal*	Democratic	13,375	55.26%
Iowa Senate general elections, 2008; District 50; Turnout: 24,204	Democratic hold	Mark A. Brandenburg	Republican	9,740	40.24%
Iowa House of Representatives primary elections, 2010; District 100	Republican	Mark A. Brandenburg	Republican	unopposed	
Iowa House of Representatives general elections, 2010; District 100; Turnout: 7,156	Republican gain from Democratic	Mark A. Brandenburg	Republican	3,699	51.69%
Iowa House of Representatives general elections, 2010; District 100; Turnout: 7,156	Republican gain from Democratic	Paul Shomshor*	Democratic	3,287	45.93%
Iowa House of Representatives primary elections, 2012; District 15	Republican	Mark A. Brandenburg*	Republican	unopposed	
Iowa House of Representatives general elections, 2012; District 15; Turnout: 11,089	Republican (newly redistricted)	Mark A. Brandenburg*	Republican	5,452	49.17%
Iowa House of Representatives general elections, 2012; District 15; Turnout: 11,089	Republican (newly redistricted)	George Warren Yaple	Democratic	5,013	45.21%

Iowa House of Representatives
Preceded by Paul Shomshor	100th District; 2011 – 2013	Succeeded by Charles Isenhart
Preceded by Brian Quirk	15th District; 2013 – present	Succeeded by Incumbent
