= Harold Van Maanen =

American politician

Speaker of the Iowa House of Representatives
- In office 1993–1995

Member of the Iowa House of Representatives
- In office 1979–1999

Personal details
- Born: July 28, 1929 Oskaloosa, Iowa, U.S.
- Died: October 12, 2021 (aged 92) Pella, Iowa, U.S.
- Party: Republican
- Spouse(s): Luella Rose Groenendyk (m. 1950; died 1993) Marie Beekhuizen Engbers (m. 1997)
- Children: 2
- Parents: Gilbert Van Maanen (father); Cora Van Hall (mother)
- Occupation: farmer

Harold Gene Van Maanen (July 28, 1929 – October 12, 2021) was an American politician in the state of Iowa.

Van Maanen was born in Oskaloosa, Iowa, the son of Gilbert and Cora (née Van Hall) Van Maanen, and married Luella Rose Groenendyk on February 23, 1950, in Tracy, Iowa. He was drafted into the U.S. Army, and served from 1952 to 1954. He was a farmer, but was involved in civic life, serving on the school board for Twin Cedars Community School District for 16 years. He served in the Iowa House of Representatives from 1979 to 1999 as a Republican. He served as Republican minority leader from 1990 to 1992, speaker from 1993 to 1995, and speaker pro tempore from 1995 to 1999. Following his first wife's death in 1993, he married Marie (née Beekhuizen) Engbers in 1997. He died in Pella, Iowa, on October 12, 2021.
