= Molly Donahue =

American educator and politician

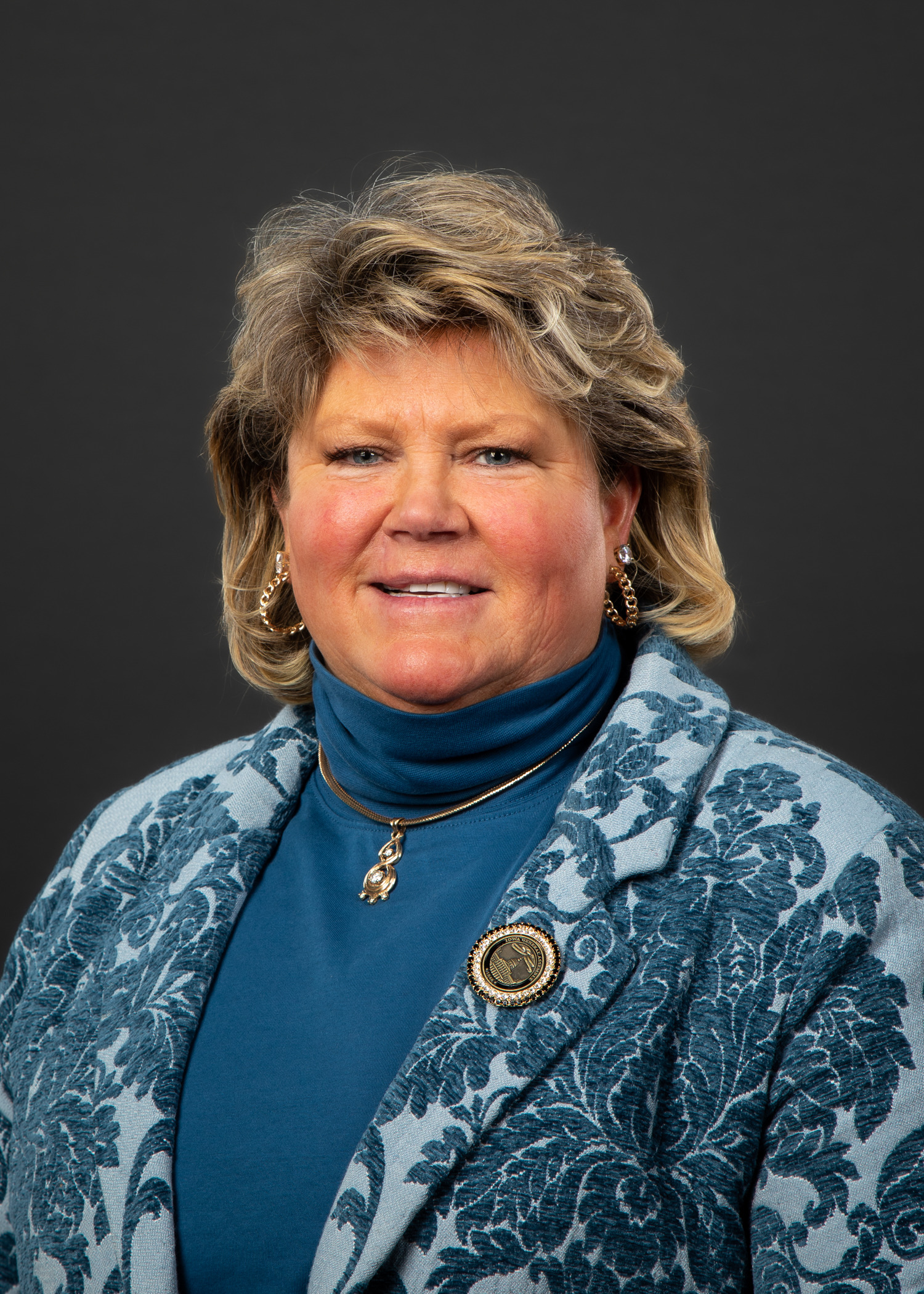

Member of the Iowa Senate from the 37 district
- Incumbent
- Assumed office January 9, 2023
- Preceded by: Zach Wahls

Member of the Iowa House of Representatives from the 68th district
- In office January 14, 2019 – January 8, 2023
- Preceded by: Ken Rizer
- Succeeded by: Chad Ingels

Personal details
- Born: 1967 (age 58–59) Cedar Rapids, Iowa, U.S.
- Party: Democratic
- Education: Iowa State University (BS); University of Northern Iowa (MEd)

Molly Donahue is an American educator and politician serving as a member of the Iowa Senate from the 37th District. She previously served as a member of the Iowa House of Representatives from the 68th district from 2019 to 2023, when she was elected to the Senate.

== Background ==
Donahue was born and raised in Cedar Rapids, Iowa, where she attended Washington High School. She earned a Bachelor of Science in elementary education and teaching from Iowa State University, followed by a Master of Education in secondary behavior disabilities from the University of Northern Iowa. Donahue works as a teacher at Washington High School. She was elected to the Iowa House of Representatives in 2018.

In 2025, Donahue introduced a bill to prohibit schools, community colleges and universities receiving state aid from using discriminatory mascots, including midgets, responding to a campaign organized against Estherville Lincoln Central High School by individuals with, and parents of children with, dwarfism.

Iowa Senate
Preceded by Hubert Houser	37th District; 2023 – present	Succeeded by Zach Wahls
Iowa House of Representatives
Preceded by Ken Rizer	68th District; 2019 – 2023	Succeeded by Chad Ingels
