= Chad Ingels =

American politician

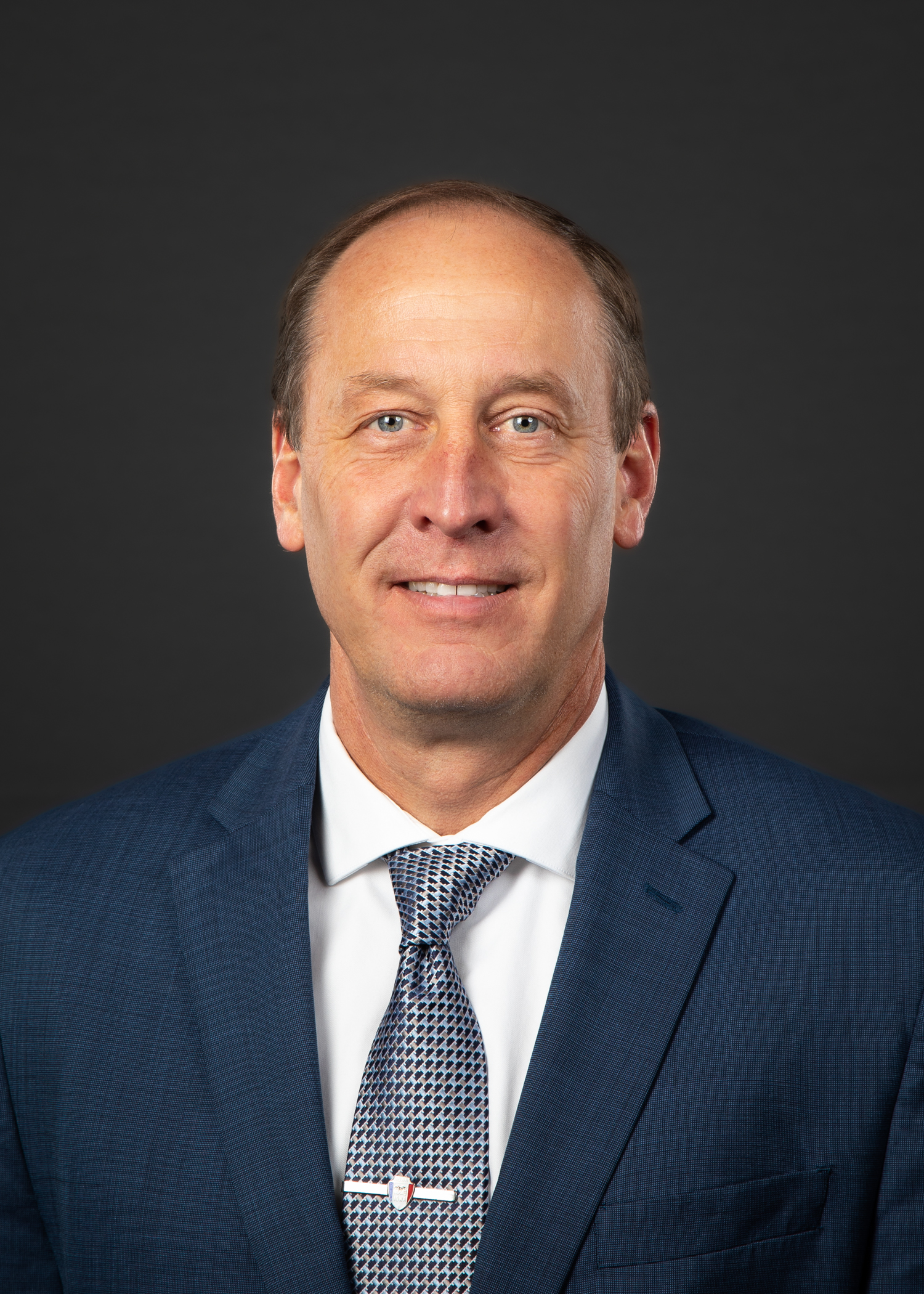

Member of the Iowa House of Representatives from the 68th district
- Incumbent
- Assumed office January 11, 2021
- Preceded by: Bruce Bearinger

Personal details
- Born: Oelwein, Iowa, U.S.
- Party: Republican
- Children: 3
- Education: Iowa State University (BS, MS)

Chad Ingels is an American farmer, business owner, and politician serving as a member of the Iowa House of Representatives from the 68th district. Elected in November 2020, he assumed office on January 11, 2021.

== Education ==
Ingels earned a Bachelor of Science in horticulture and Master of Science in professional agriculture from Iowa State University.

== Career ==
Since 1991, Ingels has owned and operated a farm. He also worked as a watershed specialist for Iowa State University Extension from 1999 to 2016. He also founded ClearWater Ag Strategies, a management firms that advises farmers on management strategies. Ingels was elected to the Iowa House of Representatives in November 2020 and assumed office on January 11, 2021. Ingels also serves as vice chair of the House Agriculture Committee.

== Personal life ==
Ingels and his wife Tammy have three children, two with Down syndrome.

Iowa House of Representatives
Preceded by Molly Donahue	68th District; 2023 – present	Succeeded by Incumbent
Preceded by Bruce Bearinger	64th District; 2021 – 2023	Succeeded by Anne Osmundson
