= Daniel Lundby =

American politician

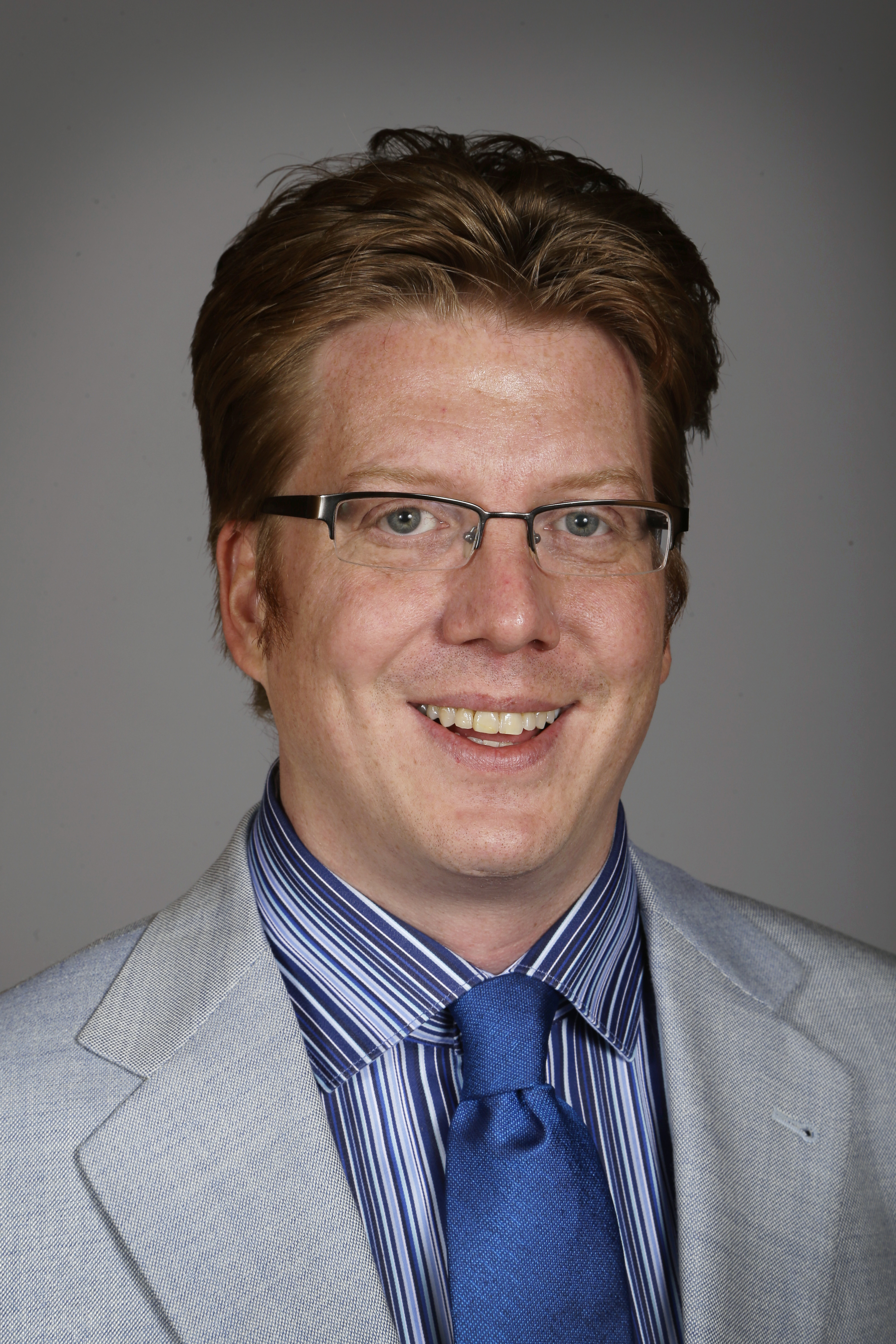
- Lundby in 2013

Member of the Iowa House of Representatives from the 68th district
- In office January 14, 2013 – January 2015
- Preceded by: Nick Wagner
- Succeeded by: Ken Rizer

Personal details
- Born: 1976 or 1977 (age 49–50) Marion, Iowa, U.S.
- Party: Democratic

Daniel Lundby is an American politician from Linn County, Iowa. He represented the 68th district in the Iowa House of Representatives for a single term from 2013 to 2015 as a Democrat.

== Early life and career ==
A fifth generation Iowan, Lundby is the son of Mary Lundby, a Republican who represented Linn County in the legislature from 1987 to 2009. He attended St. Joseph's Catholic Elementary in Marion and Regis High School in Cedar Rapids. He then earned an associate degree from Kirkwood Community College; a Bachelor of Science from Iowa State University (2003) and a master's degree from ISU (2011).

== In politics ==
Lundby ran for the Iowa House in 2012, facing two-term Republican incumbent Nick Wagner. In a very close race, Lundby prevailed by 8,480 votes to Wagner's 8,363. Lundby took office on January 14, 2013. He was defeated for re-election in 2014 by Republican Ken Rizer.

== Personal ==
Lundby is openly gay.
