= Ken Rizer =

American politician (born 1964)

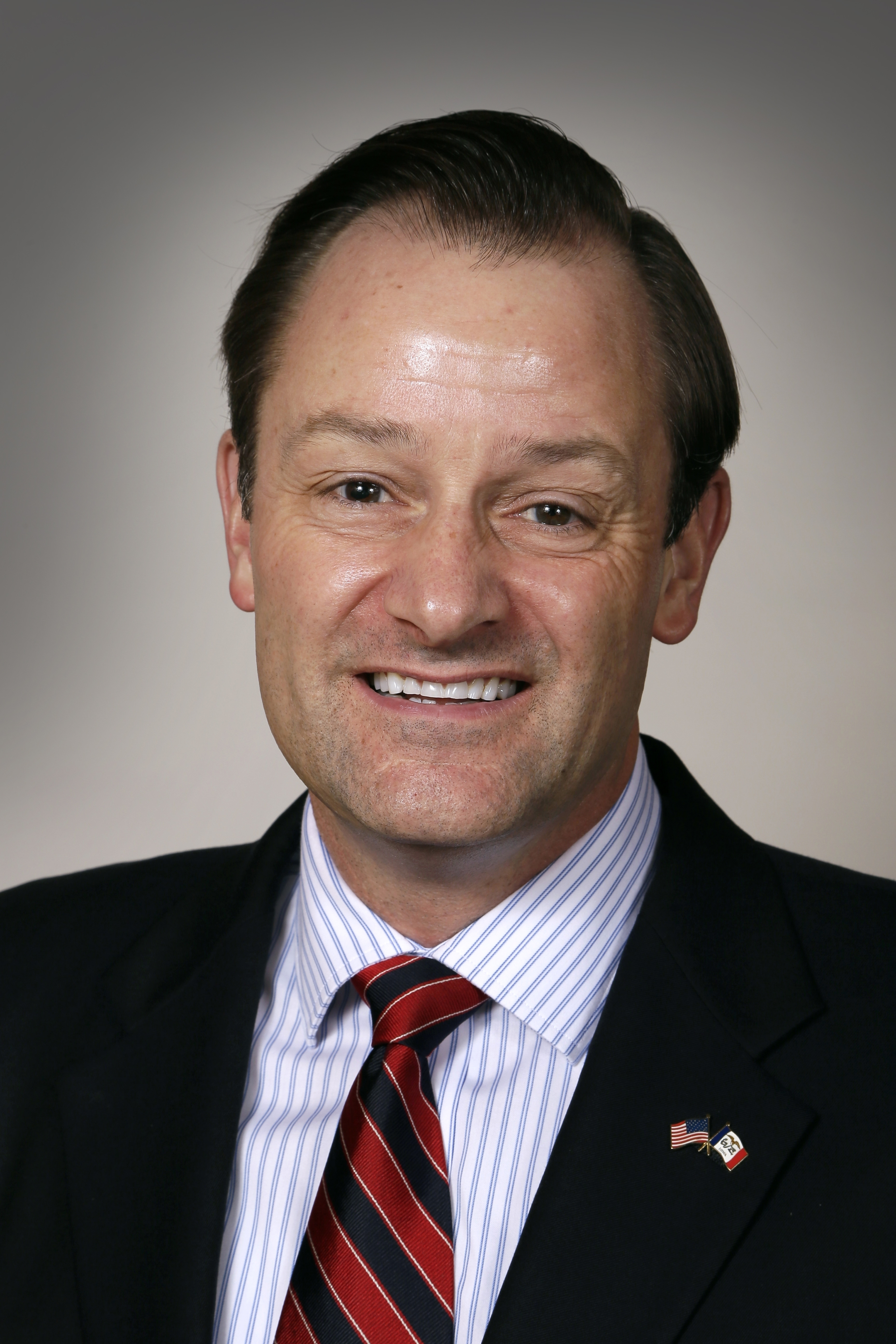

Member of the Iowa House of Representatives from the 68th district
- In office January 12, 2015 – January 14, 2019
- Preceded by: Daniel Lundby
- Succeeded by: Molly Donahue

Personal details
- Born: September 17, 1964 (age 61) Minneapolis, Minnesota, U.S.
- Party: Republican
- Education: U.S. Air Force Academy (BS); Air War College (MS); Harvard University (MPA); University of Iowa (MBA)

Ken Rizer (born September 17, 1964) was an American politician. A former Republican (Rizer renounced his party affiliation in July 2018), he served the 68th District in the Iowa House of Representatives from 2015 to 2018. Rizer is a retired colonel in the United States Air Force.

Beginning January 2017, Rizer served on the Judiciary, Public Safety, Ways & Means, and State Government committees in the Iowa House.

== Early life and education ==
Rizer was born in Minneapolis, Minnesota. He graduated from Southwest High School in Minneapolis. Rizer attended the United States Air Force Academy, where he received a B.S. in Foreign Affairs and Political Science and was accepted into the Barry M. Goldwater Scholarship program. As a junior officer in the United States military, Rizer was admitted to The Olmsted Scholar Program, where he studied Swedish at the U.S. Department of State’s Foreign Service Institute before spending two years at Stockholm University in Sweden studying International Security.

He received his master's degree in Strategic Studies at Air University’s Air War College, an MPA from the John F. Kennedy School of Government at Harvard University, and an MBA from the University of Iowa.

== Career ==
Rizer served 25 years as an Air Force fighter pilot and commander, completing 15 assignments and leading men and women in combat during tours in Iraq. He led Joint Base Andrews, the home of Air Force One, as Base Commander.

After retiring from the military in 2012, Rizer became the Senior Vice President of Operations for Goodwill Industries Goodwill of the Heartland. He currently holds a position as an assistant professor of aviation at the University of Dubuque in Dubuque, IA. As of June 2020, the University of Dubuque faculty directory does not list Rizer as a faculty member

== Electoral history ==
| Election | Political result | Candidate | Party | Votes | % |
|---|---|---|---|---|---|
| Iowa House of Representatives elections, 2014; District 68; Turnout: 13,450 | Republican gain from Democratic | Ken Rizer | Republican | 6,989 | 53.1 |
| Iowa House of Representatives elections, 2014; District 68; Turnout: 13,450 | Republican gain from Democratic | Daniel Lundby* | Democratic | 6,171 | 46.9 |
| Iowa House of Representatives elections, 2016; District 68; Turnout: 18,038 | Republican hold | Ken Rizer* | Republican | 9,317 | 51.65 |
| Iowa House of Representatives elections, 2016; District 68; Turnout: 18,038 | Republican hold | Molly Donahue | Democratic | 7,921 | 43.91 |
