= Jerry Welter =

American politician

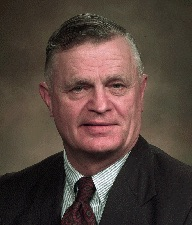

Member of the Iowa House of Representatives
- In office January 11, 1993 – January 7, 2001

Personal details
- Born: February 17, 1935 (age 91) Monticello, Iowa, United States
- Party: Republican
- Spouse: Ruth Ann Muller
- Children: two
- Occupation: Farmer

Jerry J. Welter (born February 17, 1935) is an American politician in the state of Iowa.

Welter was born in Monticello, Iowa. A Republican, he served in the Iowa House of Representatives from 1993 to 2001 (56th district).
