= 1916 Iowa Senate election =

- November 7, 1916

30 out of 50 seats in the Iowa Senate 26 seats needed for a majority
| | Majority party | Minority party |
|---|---|---|
| Party | Republican | Democratic |
| Last election | 35 | 15 |
| Seats after | 40 | 10 |
| Seat change | ▲5 | ▼5 |
- Results; Democratic gain Republican gain Democratic hold Republican hold

The 1916 Iowa Senate elections took place as part of the biennial 1916 United States elections. Iowa voters elected state senators in 30 of the senate's 50 districts. State senators serve four-year terms in the Iowa Senate.

A statewide map of the 50 state senate districts in the 1916 elections is provided by the Iowa General Assembly here.

The primary election on June 5, 1916, determined which candidates appeared on the November 7, 1916 general election ballot.

Following the previous election, Republicans had control of the Iowa Senate with 35 seats to Democrats' 15 seats.

To claim control of the chamber from Republicans, the Democrats needed to net 11 Senate seats.

Republicans maintained control of the Iowa State Senate following the 1916 general election, with the balance of power shifting to Republicans holding 40 seats and Democrats having 10 seats (a net gain of five seats for Republicans).

== Summary of Results ==
- Note: 20 districts with holdover Senators not up for re-election are not listed on this table.

| Senate district | Incumbent | Party | Elected senator | Party |
|---|---|---|---|---|
| 2nd | John H. Taylor | Rep | George Washington Ball | Rep |
| 3rd | James M. Wilson | Rep | James M. Wilson | Rep |
| 4th | John H. Darrah | Rep | Karl Miler Le Compte | Rep |
| 5th | Charles H. Thomas | Rep | James Allen Stephenson | Dem |
| 6th | Albert D. Nye | Rep | Benjamin J. Gibson | Rep |
| 8th | Frank F. Jones | Rep | William C. Ratcliff | Rep |
| 11th | LeMerton Edson Crist | Rep | Aaron VanScoy Proudfoot | Rep |
| 14th | John Fletcher Ream | Dem | Elmer Ellsworth Mitchell | Rep |
| 15th | John Thomas Clarkson | Dem | John Rees Price | Rep |
| 16th | Arthur Craig Savage | Rep | Edward McMurray Smith | Rep |
| 17th | John Wasson Foster | Rep | John Wasson Foster | Rep |
| 19th | Clement F. Kimball | Rep | Clement F. Kimball | Rep |
| 23rd | George Earl Hilsinger | Rep | Albert L. Broxam | Dem |
| 24th | William David Sheean | Dem | John K. Hale | Rep |
| 25th | James A. White | Dem | Otto A. Byington | Dem |
| 26th | Francis A. Heald | Rep | Willis G. Haskell | Rep |
| 27th | Frederic Larrabee | Rep | Perry C. Holdoegel | Rep |
| 28th | Wallace H. Arney | Rep | Wallace H. Arney | Rep |
| 31st | Justin R. Doran | Rep | Ben Edwards | Rep |
| 32nd | Edgar P. Farr | Dem | Charles Franklin Lytle | Rep |
| 33rd | Eli Cushman Perkins | Rep | Thomas Eddy Taylor | Rep |
| 36th | Robert Pollok Quigley | Dem | Byron W. Newberry | Rep |
| 39th | Fred P. Hagemann | Dem | William Thomas Evans | Rep |
| 40th | Albert M. Fellows | Rep | Albert M. Fellows | Rep |
| 41st | Lars W. Boe | Rep | Thomas A. Kingland | Rep |
| 43rd | Thomas J. B. Robinson | Rep | Arthur Lynnwood Rule | Rep |
| 46th | Guy Mark Gillette | Dem | George Franklin Coburn | Rep |
| 47th | Leslie E. Francis | Rep | Henry C. Adams | Rep |
| 49th | Nicholas Balkema | Rep | Nicholas Balkema | Rep |
| 50th | Joseph Holmes Allen | Rep | Howard Spicer Van Alstine | Rep |

== Detailed results ==
Popular vote share by district: Democratic 40–49% 50–59% / Republican 40–49% 50–59% 60–69% 70–79% 90–100%

- NOTE: The 20 districts that did not hold elections in 1916 are not listed here.
- Note: If a district does not list a primary, then that district did not have a competitive primary (i.e., there may have only been one candidate file for that district).

=== District 2 ===
Iowa Senate, District 2 Republican primary election, 1916
| Party | Candidate | Votes | % |
|---|---|---|---|
| Republican | George W. Ball | 2,761 | 100.00% |
| Total votes | | 2,761 | 100.00% |

Iowa Senate, District 2 Democratic primary election, 1916
| Party | Candidate | Votes | % |
|---|---|---|---|
| Democratic | S. H. Bauman | 1,162 | 100.00% |
| Total votes | | 1,162 | 100.00% |

Iowa Senate, District 2 general election, 1916
| Party | Candidate | Votes | % |
|---|---|---|---|
| Republican | George W. Ball | 3,835 | 51.30% |
| Democratic | S. H. Bauman | 3,631 | 48.58% |
| Unknown (Note: The Iowa General Assembly did not list political party affiliation for all candidates.) | R. D. Tobin | 9 | 0.12% |
| Total votes | | 7,475 | 100.00% |
| Republican hold | | | |

=== District 3 ===
Iowa Senate, District 3 Republican primary election, 1916
| Party | Candidate | Votes | % |
|---|---|---|---|
| Republican | James M. Wilson (incumbent) | 3,004 | 100.00% |
| Total votes | | 3,004 | 100.00% |

Iowa Senate, District 3 Democratic primary election, 1916
| Party | Candidate | Votes | % |
|---|---|---|---|
| Democratic | S. A. Stuckey | 2,069 | 100.00% |
| Total votes | | 2,069 | 100.00% |

Iowa Senate, District 3 general election, 1916
| Party | Candidate | Votes | % |
|---|---|---|---|
| Republican | James M. Wilson (incumbent) | 4,746 | 51.31% |
| Democratic | S. A. Stuckey | 4,094 | 44.26% |
| Unknown | I. S. McCrillis | 409 | 4.42% |
| Total votes | | 9,249 | 100.00% |
| Republican hold | | | |

=== District 4 ===
Iowa Senate, District 4 Republican primary election, 1916
| Party | Candidate | Votes | % |
|---|---|---|---|
| Republican | Karl M. LeCompte | 1,829 | 57.23% |
| Republican | George W. Hinkle | 1,367 | 42.77% |
| Total votes | | 3,196 | 100.00% |

Iowa Senate, District 4 Democratic primary election, 1916
| Party | Candidate | Votes | % |
|---|---|---|---|
| Democratic | Joseph E. Doze | 1,667 | 100.00% |
| Total votes | | 1,667 | 100.00% |

Iowa Senate, District 4 Socialist primary election, 1916
| Party | Candidate | Votes | % |
|---|---|---|---|
| Socialist | Joshua Clark | 89 | 100.00% |
| Total votes | | 89 | 100.00% |

Iowa Senate, District 4 general election, 1916
| Party | Candidate | Votes | % |
|---|---|---|---|
| Republican | Karl M. Le Compte | 3,563 | 49.35% |
| Democratic | Joseph E. Doze | 3,364 | 46.59% |
| Socialist | Joshua Clark | 293 | 4.06% |
| Total votes | | 7,220 | 100.00% |
| Republican hold | | | |

=== District 5 ===
Iowa Senate, District 5 Republican primary election, 1916
| Party | Candidate | Votes | % |
|---|---|---|---|
| Republican | Scott Skinner | 2,692 | 52.57% |
| Republican | E. J. Heaton | 2,429 | 47.43% |
| Total votes | | 5,121 | 100.00% |

Iowa Senate, District 5 general election, 1916
| Party | Candidate | Votes | % |
|---|---|---|---|
| Democratic | James A. Stephenson | 5,683 | 51.35% |
| Republican | Scott Skinner | 5,385 | 48.65% |
| Total votes | | 11,068 | 100.00% |
| Democratic gain from Republican | | | |

=== District 6 ===
Iowa Senate, District 6 Republican primary election, 1916
| Party | Candidate | Votes | % |
|---|---|---|---|
| Republican | Benjamin J. Gibson | 2,898 | 100.00% |
| Total votes | | 2,898 | 100.00% |

Iowa Senate, District 6 general election, 1916
| Party | Candidate | Votes | % |
|---|---|---|---|
| Republican | Benjamin J. Gibson | 4,285 | 99.84% |
| Unknown | Carl Stanley | 7 | 0.16% |
| Total votes | | 4,292 | 100.00% |
| Republican hold | | | |

=== District 8 ===
Iowa Senate, District 8 Republican primary election, 1916
| Party | Candidate | Votes | % |
|---|---|---|---|
| Republican | W. C. Ratcliff | 2,412 | 70.51% |
| Republican | F. F. Jones (incumbent) | 1,009 | 29.49% |
| Total votes | | 3,421 | 100.00% |

Iowa Senate, District 8 general election, 1916
| Party | Candidate | Votes | % |
|---|---|---|---|
| Republican | W. C. Ratcliff | 4,453 | 98.45% |
| Unknown | William Ross | 66 | 1.46% |
| Republican | F. F. Jones (incumbent) | 4 | 0.09% |
| Total votes | | 4,523 | 100.00% |
| Republican hold | | | |

=== District 11 ===
Iowa Senate, District 11 Republican primary election, 1916
| Party | Candidate | Votes | % |
|---|---|---|---|
| Republican | Aaron V. Proudfoot | 2,827 | 100.00% |
| Total votes | | 2,827 | 100.00% |

Iowa Senate, District 11 Democratic primary election, 1916
| Party | Candidate | Votes | % |
|---|---|---|---|
| Democratic | L. J. Klemm | 836 | 100.00% |
| Total votes | | 836 | 100.00% |

Iowa Senate, District 11 general election, 1916
| Party | Candidate | Votes | % |
|---|---|---|---|
| Republican | Aaron V. Proudfoot | 3,818 | 60.89% |
| Democratic | L. J. Klemm | 2,452 | 39.11% |
| Total votes | | 6,270 | 100.00% |
| Republican hold | | | |

=== District 14 ===
Iowa Senate, District 14 Republican primary election, 1916
| Party | Candidate | Votes | % |
|---|---|---|---|
| Republican | Elmer E. Mitchell | 816 | 36.51% |
| Republican | F. W. Else | 727 | 32.53% |
| Republican | W. I. Beans | 692 | 30.96% |
| Total votes | | 2,235 | 100.00% |

Iowa Senate, District 14 Democratic primary election, 1916
| Party | Candidate | Votes | % |
|---|---|---|---|
| Democratic | John F. Ream (incumbent) | 1,025 | 100.00% |
| Total votes | | 1,025 | 100.00% |

Iowa Senate, District 14 general election, 1916
| Party | Candidate | Votes | % |
|---|---|---|---|
| Republican | Elmer E. Mitchell | 3,441 | 57.02% |
| Democratic | John F. Ream (incumbent) | 2,594 | 42.98% |
| Total votes | | 6,035 | 100.00% |
| Republican gain from Democratic | | | |

=== District 15 ===
Iowa Senate, District 15 Republican primary election, 1916
| Party | Candidate | Votes | % |
|---|---|---|---|
| Republican | John R. Price | 1,996 | 53.58% |
| Republican | S. T. Gray | 1,729 | 46.42% |
| Total votes | | 3,725 | 100.00% |

Iowa Senate, District 15 Democratic primary election, 1916
| Party | Candidate | Votes | % |
|---|---|---|---|
| Democratic | Charles H. Clark | 1,750 | 100.00% |
| Total votes | | 1,750 | 100.00% |

Iowa Senate, District 15 general election, 1916
| Party | Candidate | Votes | % |
|---|---|---|---|
| Republican | John R. Price | 4,679 | 48.88% |
| Democratic | Charles H. Clark | 4,391 | 45.87% |
| Unknown | Samuel Cooper | 502 | 5.24% |
| Total votes | | 9,572 | 100.00% |
| Republican gain from Democratic | | | |

=== District 16 ===
Iowa Senate, District 16 Republican primary election, 1916
| Party | Candidate | Votes | % |
|---|---|---|---|
| Republican | Ed. M. Smith | 1,626 | 46.10% |
| Republican | George M. White | 1,077 | 30.54% |
| Republican | Leo C. Percival | 824 | 23.36% |
| Total votes | | 3,527 | 100.00% |

Iowa Senate, District 16 Democratic primary election, 1916
| Party | Candidate | Votes | % |
|---|---|---|---|
| Democratic | George M. Pratt | 1,048 | 100.00% |
| Total votes | | 1,048 | 100.00% |

Iowa Senate, District 16 general election, 1916
| Party | Candidate | Votes | % |
|---|---|---|---|
| Republican | Ed. M. Smith | 4,197 | 61.15% |
| Democratic | George M. Pratt | 2,666 | 38.85% |
| Total votes | | 6,863 | 100.00% |
| Republican hold | | | |

=== District 17 ===
Iowa Senate, District 17 Republican primary election, 1916
| Party | Candidate | Votes | % |
|---|---|---|---|
| Republican | John W. Foster (incumbent) | 5,213 | 100.00% |
| Total votes | | 5,213 | 100.00% |

Iowa Senate, District 17 Democratic primary election, 1916
| Party | Candidate | Votes | % |
|---|---|---|---|
| Democratic | T. L. Myers | 1,559 | 100.00% |
| Total votes | | 1,559 | 100.00% |

Iowa Senate, District 17 general election, 1916
| Party | Candidate | Votes | % |
|---|---|---|---|
| Republican | John W. Foster (incumbent) | 6,228 | 55.45% |
| Democratic | T. L. Myers | 4,872 | 43.38% |
| Unknown | John Kent | 106 | 0.94% |
| Unknown | H. C. M. Nordley | 25 | 0.22% |
| Total votes | | 11,231 | 100.00% |
| Republican hold | | | |

=== District 19 ===
Iowa Senate, District 19 Republican primary election, 1916
| Party | Candidate | Votes | % |
|---|---|---|---|
| Republican | Clem F. Kimball (incumbent) | 3,415 | 100.00% |
| Total votes | | 3,415 | 100.00% |

Iowa Senate, District 19 Democratic primary election, 1916
| Party | Candidate | Votes | % |
|---|---|---|---|
| Democratic | J. W. Bell | 1,595 | 100.00% |
| Total votes | | 1,595 | 100.00% |

Iowa Senate, District 19 general election, 1916
| Party | Candidate | Votes | % |
|---|---|---|---|
| Republican | Clem F. Kimball (incumbent) | 6,493 | 55.12% |
| Democratic | J. W. Bell | 5,287 | 44.88% |
| Total votes | | 11,780 | 100.00% |
| Republican hold | | | |

=== District 23 ===
Iowa Senate, District 23 Republican primary election, 1916
| Party | Candidate | Votes | % |
|---|---|---|---|
| Republican | F. W. Myatt | 1,098 | 100.00% |
| Total votes | | 1,098 | 100.00% |

Iowa Senate, District 23 Democratic primary election, 1916
| Party | Candidate | Votes | % |
|---|---|---|---|
| Democratic | A. L. Broxam | 969 | 100.00% |
| Total votes | | 969 | 100.00% |

Iowa Senate, District 23 Socialist primary election, 1916
| Party | Candidate | Votes | % |
|---|---|---|---|
| Socialist | Levi Edwards | 19 | 100.00% |
| Total votes | | 19 | 100.00% |

Iowa Senate, District 23 general election, 1916
| Party | Candidate | Votes | % |
|---|---|---|---|
| Democratic | A. L. Broxam | 2,368 | 51.87% |
| Republican | F. W. Myatt | 2,197 | 48.13% |
| Total votes | | 4,565 | 100.00% |
| Democratic gain from Republican | | | |

=== District 24 ===
Iowa Senate, District 24 Republican primary election, 1916
| Party | Candidate | Votes | % |
|---|---|---|---|
| Republican | J. K. Hale | 1,655 | 51.00% |
| Republican | C. E. Reed | 1,590 | 49.00% |
| Total votes | | 3,245 | 100.00% |

Iowa Senate, District 24 Democratic primary election, 1916
| Party | Candidate | Votes | % |
|---|---|---|---|
| Democratic | W. D. Sheean (incumbent) | 1,938 | 100.00% |
| Total votes | | 1,938 | 100.00% |

Iowa Senate, District 24 general election, 1916
| Party | Candidate | Votes | % |
|---|---|---|---|
| Republican | J. K. Hale | 5,131 | 57.35% |
| Democratic | William D. Sheean (incumbent) | 3,816 | 42.65% |
| Total votes | | 8,947 | 100.00% |
| Republican gain from Democratic | | | |

=== District 25 ===
Iowa Senate, District 25 Republican primary election, 1916
| Party | Candidate | Votes | % |
|---|---|---|---|
| Republican | W. O. Coast | 2,440 | 100.00% |
| Total votes | | 2,440 | 100.00% |

Iowa Senate, District 25 Democratic primary election, 1916
| Party | Candidate | Votes | % |
|---|---|---|---|
| Democratic | O. A. Byington | 1,857 | 56.68% |
| Democratic | James A. White (incumbent) | 1,419 | 43.32% |
| Total votes | | 3,276 | 100.00% |

Iowa Senate, District 25 general election, 1916
| Party | Candidate | Votes | % |
|---|---|---|---|
| Democratic | O. A. Byington | 5,364 | 50.81% |
| Republican | W. O. Coast | 5,194 | 49.19% |
| Total votes | | 10,558 | 100.00% |
| Democratic hold | | | |

=== District 26 ===
Iowa Senate, District 26 Republican primary election, 1916
| Party | Candidate | Votes | % |
|---|---|---|---|
| Republican | W. G. Haskell | 3,919 | 56.73% |
| Republican | Herbert C. Ring | 2,989 | 43.27% |
| Total votes | | 6,908 | 100.00% |

Iowa Senate, District 26 general election, 1916
| Party | Candidate | Votes | % |
|---|---|---|---|
| Republican | W. G. Haskell | 8,199 | 59.16% |
| Unknown | Peter G. Henderson | 5,659 | 40.84% |
| Total votes | | 13,858 | 100.00% |
| Republican hold | | | |

=== District 27 ===
Iowa Senate, District 27 Republican primary election, 1916
| Party | Candidate | Votes | % |
|---|---|---|---|
| Republican | Perry C. Holdoegel | 4,375 | 100.00% |
| Total votes | | 4,375 | 100.00% |

Iowa Senate, District 27 Democratic primary election, 1916
| Party | Candidate | Votes | % |
|---|---|---|---|
| Democratic | J. J. Coady | 1,084 | 100.00% |
| Total votes | | 1,084 | 100.00% |

Iowa Senate, District 27 Socialist primary election, 1916
| Party | Candidate | Votes | % |
|---|---|---|---|
| Socialist | J. T. Puckett | 35 | 100.00% |
| Total votes | | 35 | 100.00% |

Iowa Senate, District 27 general election, 1916
| Party | Candidate | Votes | % |
|---|---|---|---|
| Republican | Perry C. Holdoegel | 5,882 | 58.03% |
| Unknown | H. Mullarky | 3,856 | 38.04% |
| Socialist | J. T. Puckett | 398 | 3.93% |
| Total votes | | 10,136 | 100.00% |
| Republican hold | | | |

=== District 28 ===
Iowa Senate, District 28 Republican primary election, 1916
| Party | Candidate | Votes | % |
|---|---|---|---|
| Republican | Wallace H. Arney (incumbent) | 1,750 | 53.09% |
| Republican | John B. Classen | 1,546 | 46.91% |
| Total votes | | 3,296 | 100.00% |

Iowa Senate, District 28 Democratic primary election, 1916
| Party | Candidate | Votes | % |
|---|---|---|---|
| Democratic | Theo. F. Bradford | 412 | 100.00% |
| Total votes | | 412 | 100.00% |

Iowa Senate, District 28 general election, 1916
| Party | Candidate | Votes | % |
|---|---|---|---|
| Republican | Wallace H. Arney (incumbent) | 3,908 | 62.21% |
| Democratic | Theo. F. Bradford | 2,374 | 37.79% |
| Total votes | | 6,282 | 100.00% |
| Republican hold | | | |

=== District 31 ===
Iowa Senate, District 31 Republican primary election, 1916
| Party | Candidate | Votes | % |
|---|---|---|---|
| Republican | Ben Edwards | 3,289 | 55.86% |
| Republican | L. M. Bosworth | 2,599 | 44.14% |
| Total votes | | 5,888 | 100.00% |

Iowa Senate, District 31 Democratic primary election, 1916
| Party | Candidate | Votes | % |
|---|---|---|---|
| Democratic | Arthur Dean | 765 | 100.00% |
| Total votes | | 765 | 100.00% |

Iowa Senate, District 31 general election, 1916
| Party | Candidate | Votes | % |
|---|---|---|---|
| Republican | Ben Edwards | 7,025 | 72.52% |
| Democratic | Arthur Dean | 2,662 | 27.48% |
| Total votes | | 9,687 | 100.00% |
| Republican hold | | | |

=== District 32 ===
Iowa Senate, District 32 Republican primary election, 1916
| Party | Candidate | Votes | % |
|---|---|---|---|
| Republican | C. F. Lytle | 3,437 | 51.96% |
| Republican | Bertel M. Stoddard | 3,178 | 48.04% |
| Total votes | | 6,615 | 100.00% |

Iowa Senate, District 32 general election, 1916
| Party | Candidate | Votes | % |
|---|---|---|---|
| Republican | C. F. Lytle | 8,270 | 100.00% |
| Total votes | | 8,270 | 100.00% |
| Republican gain from Democratic | | | |

=== District 33 ===
Iowa Senate, District 33 Republican primary election, 1916
| Party | Candidate | Votes | % |
|---|---|---|---|
| Republican | Thomas E. Taylor (incumbent) | 3,511 | 100.00% |
| Total votes | | 3,511 | 100.00% |

Iowa Senate, District 33 Democratic primary election, 1916
| Party | Candidate | Votes | % |
|---|---|---|---|
| Democratic | Robert Barr | 985 | 100.00% |
| Total votes | | 985 | 100.00% |

Iowa Senate, District 33 general election, 1916
| Party | Candidate | Votes | % |
|---|---|---|---|
| Republican | Thomas E. Taylor (incumbent) | 5,374 | 64.27% |
| Democratic | Robert Barr | 2,907 | 34.76% |
| Unknown | F. A. Doolittle | 81 | 0.97% |
| Total votes | | 8,362 | 100.00% |
| Republican hold | | | |

=== District 36 ===
Iowa Senate, District 36 Republican primary election, 1916
| Party | Candidate | Votes | % |
|---|---|---|---|
| Republican | Byron W. Newberry | 1,411 | 100.00% |
| Total votes | | 1,411 | 100.00% |

Iowa Senate, District 36 Democratic primary election, 1916
| Party | Candidate | Votes | % |
|---|---|---|---|
| Democratic | Robert Quigley (incumbent) | 1,300 | 100.00% |
| Total votes | | 1,300 | 100.00% |

Iowa Senate, District 36 general election, 1916
| Party | Candidate | Votes | % |
|---|---|---|---|
| Republican | B. W. Newberry | 3,084 | 57.40% |
| Democratic | Robert Quigley (incumbent) | 2,249 | 41.86% |
| Unknown | Michael McDonough | 40 | 0.74% |
| Total votes | | 5,373 | 100.00% |
| Republican gain from Democratic | | | |

=== District 39 ===
Iowa Senate, District 39 Republican primary election, 1916
| Party | Candidate | Votes | % |
|---|---|---|---|
| Republican | W. T. Evans | 3,271 | 100.00% |
| Total votes | | 3,271 | 100.00% |

Iowa Senate, District 39 general election, 1916
| Party | Candidate | Votes | % |
|---|---|---|---|
| Republican | W. T. Evans | 5,132 | 100.00% |
| Total votes | | 5,132 | 100.00% |
| Republican gain from Democratic | | | |

=== District 40 ===
Iowa Senate, District 40 Republican primary election, 1916
| Party | Candidate | Votes | % |
|---|---|---|---|
| Republican | Albert M. Fellows (incumbent) | 3,488 | 100.00% |
| Total votes | | 3,488 | 100.00% |

Iowa Senate, District 40 general election, 1916
| Party | Candidate | Votes | % |
|---|---|---|---|
| Republican | Albert M. Fellows (incumbent) | 6,112 | 92.75% |
| Unknown | J. E. Grauer | 478 | 7.25% |
| Total votes | | 6,590 | 100.00% |
| Republican hold | | | |

=== District 41 ===
Iowa Senate, District 41 Republican primary election, 1916
| Party | Candidate | Votes | % |
|---|---|---|---|
| Republican | Thomas A. Kingland | 1,917 | 35.88% |
| Republican | Robert T. St. John | 1,756 | 32.87% |
| Republican | Louis A. Jensen | 981 | 18.36% |
| Republican | T. C. Rone | 689 | 12.90% |
| Total votes | | 5,343 | 100.00% |

Iowa Senate, District 41 Democratic primary election, 1916
| Party | Candidate | Votes | % |
|---|---|---|---|
| Democratic | E. E. Branstad | 454 | 100.00% |
| Total votes | | 454 | 100.00% |

Iowa Senate, District 41 general election, 1916
| Party | Candidate | Votes | % |
|---|---|---|---|
| Republican | Thomas A. Kingland | 5,177 | 77.14% |
| Democratic | E. E. Branstad | 1,466 | 21.84% |
| Unknown | Joseph Merdica | 68 | 1.01% |
| Total votes | | 6,711 | 100.00% |
| Republican hold | | | |

=== District 43 ===
Iowa Senate, District 43 Republican primary election, 1916
| Party | Candidate | Votes | % |
|---|---|---|---|
| Republican | A. L. Rule | 5,157 | 69.65% |
| Republican | J. E. Stinehart | 2,247 | 30.35% |
| Total votes | | 7,404 | 100.00% |

Iowa Senate, District 43 general election, 1916
| Party | Candidate | Votes | % |
|---|---|---|---|
| Republican | A. L. Rule | 8,042 | 100.00% |
| Total votes | | 8,042 | 100.00% |
| Republican hold | | | |

=== District 46 ===
Iowa Senate, District 46 Republican primary election, 1916
| Party | Candidate | Votes | % |
|---|---|---|---|
| Republican | George F. Coburn | 2,606 | 59.62% |
| Republican | Wilfred P. Dawson | 1,765 | 40.38% |
| Total votes | | 4,371 | 100.00% |

Iowa Senate, District 46 general election, 1916
| Party | Candidate | Votes | % |
|---|---|---|---|
| Republican | George F. Coburn | 5,225 | 51.27% |
| Democratic | Guy M. Gillette (incumbent) | 4,966 | 48.73% |
| Total votes | | 10,191 | 100.00% |
| Republican gain from Democratic | | | |

=== District 47 ===
Iowa Senate, District 47 Republican primary election, 1916
| Party | Candidate | Votes | % |
|---|---|---|---|
| Republican | Henry C. Adams | 3,409 | 40.27% |
| Republican | L. E. Francis (incumbent) | 2,852 | 33.69% |
| Republican | Charles C. Hastings | 1,652 | 19.51% |
| Republican | H. Leslie Wildey | 553 | 6.53% |
| Total votes | | 8,466 | 100.00% |

Iowa Senate, District 47 general election, 1916
| Party | Candidate | Votes | % |
|---|---|---|---|
| Republican | Henry C. Adams | 9,612 | 97.89% |
| Unknown | J. Anderson | 140 | 1.43% |
| Unknown | M. L. Soneth | 67 | 0.68% |
| Total votes | | 9,819 | 100.00% |
| Republican hold | | | |

=== District 49 ===
Iowa Senate, District 49 Republican primary election, 1916
| Party | Candidate | Votes | % |
|---|---|---|---|
| Republican | Nicholas Balkema (incumbent) | 3,459 | 57.05% |
| Republican | Peter Swenson | 2,604 | 42.95% |
| Total votes | | 6,063 | 100.00% |

Iowa Senate, District 49 Democratic primary election, 1916
| Party | Candidate | Votes | % |
|---|---|---|---|
| Democratic | Peter J. Baadte | 1,581 | 100.00% |
| Total votes | | 1,581 | 100.00% |

Iowa Senate, District 49 general election, 1916
| Party | Candidate | Votes | % |
|---|---|---|---|
| Republican | Nicholas Balkema (incumbent) | 6,987 | 58.49% |
| Democratic | Peter J. Baadte | 4,958 | 41.51% |
| Total votes | | 11,945 | 100.00% |
| Republican hold | | | |

=== District 50 ===
Iowa Senate, District 50 Republican primary election, 1916
| Party | Candidate | Votes | % |
|---|---|---|---|
| Republican | H. S. Van Alstine | 3,702 | 56.19% |
| Republican | E. H. Cunningham | 2,886 | 43.81% |
| Total votes | | 6,588 | 100.00% |

Iowa Senate, District 50 Democratic primary election, 1916
| Party | Candidate | Votes | % |
|---|---|---|---|
| Democratic | W. F. Anderson | 1,020 | 100.00% |
| Total votes | | 1,020 | 100.00% |

Iowa Senate, District 50 general election, 1916
| Party | Candidate | Votes | % |
|---|---|---|---|
| Republican | H. S. Van Alstine | 5,248 | 61.57% |
| Democratic | W. F. Anderson | 3,276 | 38.43% |
| Total votes | | 8,524 | 100.00% |
| Republican hold | | | |

== See also ==
- United States elections, 1916
- United States House of Representatives elections in Iowa, 1916
- Elections in Iowa
