= 1912 Iowa Senate election =

- November 5, 1912

29 out of 50 seats in the Iowa Senate 26 seats needed for a majority
	Majority party	Minority party
Party	Republican	Democratic
Last election	34	16
Seats after	32	18
Seat change	▼2	▲2
- Results; Democratic gain Republican gain Democratic hold Republican hold

The 1912 Iowa Senate elections took place as part of the biennial 1912 United States elections. Iowa voters elected state senators in 29 of the senate's 50 districts. State senators serve four-year terms in the Iowa Senate.

A statewide map of the 50 state Senate districts in the 1912 elections is provided by the Iowa General Assembly here.

The primary election on June 3, 1912, determined which candidates appeared on the November 5, 1912 general election ballot.

Following the previous election, Republicans had control of the Iowa Senate with 34 seats to Democrats' 16 seats.

To claim control of the chamber from Republicans, the Democrats needed to net 10 Senate seats.

Republicans maintained control of the Iowa State Senate following the 1912 general election with the balance of power shifting to Republicans holding 32 seats and Democrats having 18 seats (a net gain of 2 seats for Democrats).

== Results ==
- Note: 21 districts with holdover Senators not up for re-election are not listed on this table.

Senate district	Incumbent	Party	Elected Senator	Party
2nd	William Sylvester Allen	Rep	John H. Taylor	Rep
3rd	Lewis Leroy Taylor	Dem	James M. Wilson	Rep
4th	George McCulloch	Rep	John H. Darrah	Rep
5th	John Dana Brown	Rep	Charles H. Thomas	Rep
6th	Theophilus W. Bennett	Rep	Albert D. Nye	Rep
8th	Shirley Gillilland	Rep	Frank F. Jones	Rep
11th	Aaron VanScoy Proudfoot	Rep	LeMerton Edson Crist	Rep
14th	John Fletcher Ream	Dem	John Fletcher Ream	Dem
15th	John Thomas Clarkson	Dem	John Thomas Clarkson	Dem
16th	Arthur Craig Savage	Rep	Arthur Craig Savage	Rep
17th	Anthony Milroy McColl	Rep	Anthony Milroy McColl	Rep
19th (Note: Originally, Democrat Mack C. Goodwin was declared the victor of the general election in the 19th senatorial district. Goodwin would serve in the Iowa Senate from January 13 to February 14, 1913. However, Republican Clem F. Kimball contested the election results. The state senators decided in Kimball's favor, removed Goodwin, and installed Kimball in the seat.)	Charles George Saunders	Rep	Mack C. Goodwin (Note: Democrat Mack C. Goodwin was removed by the members of the senate after Republican Clem F. Kimball contested the results.)	Dem
19th	Charles George Saunders	Rep	Clement F. Kimball (Note: Republican Clem F. Kimball was installed in the 19th district senate seat after Democrat Mack C. Goodwin was removed by the members of the senate. The senators agreed with Republican Clem F. Kimball, who contested the election's results.)	Rep
23rd	Lyman Bradley Parshall	Dem	George Earl Hilsinger	Rep
24th	Horace Ray Chapman	Rep	William David Sheean	Dem
25th	James A. White	Dem	James A. White	Dem
26th	Willard Coldren Stuckslager	Rep	Francis A. Heald	Rep
27th	Frederic Larrabee	Rep	Frederic Larrabee	Rep
28th	Comfort Harvey Van Law	Rep	Wallace H. Arney	Rep
31st	Joseph Andrew Fitchpatrick	Rep	Justin R. Doran	Rep
32nd	Robert Hunter	Rep	Edgar P. Farr	Dem
33rd	Edwin Hiram Hoyt	Rep	Eli Cushman Perkins	Rep
36th	Robert Pollok Quigley	Dem	Robert Pollok Quigley	Dem
39th	Charles Gates	Rep	Charles Gates	Rep
40th	Henry L. Adams	Rep	Albert M. Fellows	Rep
41st	James Albert Smith	Rep	Lars W. Boe	Rep
43rd	John Hammill	Rep	Thomas J. B. Robinson	Rep
46th	James Uriah Sammis	Rep	Guy Mark Gillette	Dem
47th	Leslie E. Francis	Rep	Leslie E. Francis	Rep
49th	Nicholas Balkema	Rep	Nicholas Balkema	Rep

== Detailed results ==
- Note: The 21 districts that did not hold elections in 1912 are not listed here.
- Note: If a district does not list a primary, then that district did not have a competitive primary (i.e., there may have only been one candidate file for that district).

=== District 2 ===
Iowa Senate, District 2 Republican primary election, 1912
Party	Candidate	Votes	%
Republican	J. H. Taylor	1,546	54.76%
Republican	Charles J. Fulton	1,277	45.24%
Total votes		2,823	100.00%

Iowa Senate, District 2 general election, 1912
Party	Candidate	Votes	%
Republican	John H. Taylor	3,248	49.35%
Democratic	A. E. Labaugh	3,187	48.42%
Prohibition	J. W. Wolf	147	2.23%
Total votes		6,582	100.00%
Republican hold			

=== District 3 ===
Iowa Senate, District 3 Republican primary election, 1912
Party	Candidate	Votes	%
Republican	James M. Wilson	1,843	56.33%
Republican	George D. Lynch	750	22.92%
Republican	George W. Swan	679	20.75%
Total votes		3,272	100.00%

Iowa Senate, District 3 general election, 1912
Party	Candidate	Votes	%
Republican	James M. Wilson	4,148	53.58%
Democratic	R. W. Anderson	3,593	46.42%
Total votes		7,741	100.00%
Republican gain from Democratic			

=== District 4 ===
Iowa Senate, District 4 Republican primary election, 1912
Party	Candidate	Votes	%
Republican	John H. Darrah	1,500	54.90%
Republican	E. A. Anderson	1,232	45.10%
Total votes		2,732	100.00%

Iowa Senate, District 4 general election, 1912
Party	Candidate	Votes	%
Republican	John H. Darrah	2,951	49.60%
Democratic	H. L. Exley	2,838	47.70%
Progressive	U. S. Cooper	161	2.71%
Total votes		5,950	100.00%
Republican hold			

=== District 5 ===
Iowa Senate, District 5 Republican primary election, 1912
Party	Candidate	Votes	%
Republican	C. H. Thomas	3,045	63.96%
Republican	J. W. Lauder	1,716	36.04%
Total votes		4,761	100.00%

Iowa Senate, District 5 general election, 1912
Party	Candidate	Votes	%
Republican	C. H. Thomas	5,269	55.54%
Democratic	Henry C. Beard	4,061	42.81%
Progressive	C. E. Harvey	157	1.65%
Total votes		9,487	100.00%
Republican hold			

=== District 6 ===
Iowa Senate, District 6 Republican primary election, 1912
Party	Candidate	Votes	%
Republican	A. D. Nye	2,132	65.46%
Republican	H. E. Tomlinson	1,125	34.54%
Total votes		3,257	100.00%

Iowa Senate, District 6 general election, 1912
Party	Candidate	Votes	%
Republican	A. D. Nye	3,381	55.28%
Democratic	Carl Stanley	2,735	44.72%
Total votes		6,116	100.00%
Republican hold			

=== District 8 ===
Iowa Senate, District 8 general election, 1912
Party	Candidate	Votes	%
Republican	F. F. Jones	3,160	49.31%
Democratic	W. S. Reiley	2,716	42.38%
Progressive	A. C. Gustafson	401	6.26%
Socialist	James P. Christie	132	2.06%
Total votes		6,409	100.00%
Republican hold			

=== District 11 ===
Iowa Senate, District 11 Republican primary election, 1912
Party	Candidate	Votes	%
Republican	L. E. Crist	1,602	48.86%
Republican	John Gardiner	1,182	36.05%
Republican	Carl Dare	495	15.10%
Total votes		3,279	100.00%

Iowa Senate, District 11 general election, 1912
Party	Candidate	Votes	%
Republican	L. E. Crist	3,052	53.58%
Democratic	Theodore Wall	2,208	38.76%
Progressive	A. U. Lang	436	7.65%
Total votes		5,696	100.00%
Republican hold			

=== District 14 ===
Iowa Senate, District 14 Republican primary election, 1912
Party	Candidate	Votes	%
Republican	Walter I. Beans	1,257	51.41%
Republican	Elmer Mitchell	1,188	48.59%
Total votes		2,445	100.00%

Iowa Senate, District 14 Progressive primary election, 1912
Party	Candidate	Votes	%
Progressive	G. W. Boyce	47	64.38%
Progressive	James Picken	26	35.62%
Total votes		73	100.00%

Iowa Senate, District 14 general election, 1912
Party	Candidate	Votes	%
Democratic	John F. Ream (incumbent)	2,911	51.77%
Republican	W. I. Beans	2,502	44.50%
Prohibition	G. W. Boyce	210	3.73%
Total votes		5,623	100.00%
Democratic hold			

=== District 15 ===
Iowa Senate, District 15 general election, 1912
Party	Candidate	Votes	%
Democratic	John T. Clarkson (incumbent)	4,132	45.38%
Republican	R. L. Welch	4,008	44.02%
Socialist	Charles Bruce	965	10.60%
Total votes		9,105	100.00%
Democratic hold			

=== District 16 ===
Iowa Senate, District 16 general election, 1912
Party	Candidate	Votes	%
Republican	Arthur C. Savage (incumbent)	2,875	44.12%
Democratic	John Schoenenberger	2,816	43.22%
Progressive	Harry W. Hill	660	10.13%
Socialist	B. N. Clark	88	1.35%
Prohibition	T. C. Dugan	77	1.18%
Total votes		6,516	100.00%
Republican hold			

=== District 17 ===
Iowa Senate, District 17 general election, 1912
Party	Candidate	Votes	%
Republican	Anthony M. McColl (incumbent)	6,060	60.80%
Democratic	H. H. Crenshaw	3,720	37.32%
Progressive	A. J. Hadley	187	1.88%
Total votes		9,967	100.00%
Republican hold			

=== District 19 ===
Iowa Senate, District 19 Republican primary election, 1912
Party	Candidate	Votes	%
Republican	Clement F. Kimball	2,367	70.76%
Republican	Owen J. McManus	978	29.24%
Total votes		3,345	100.00%

Iowa Senate, District 19 general election, 1912
Party	Candidate	Votes	%
Democratic	Mack C. Goodwin	5,071	48.27%
Republican	Clement F. Kimball	5,026	47.84%
Socialist	S. S. Beem	328	3.12%
Prohibition	A. J. Matthews	80	0.76%
Total votes		10,505	100.00%
Democratic gain from Republican			

- Originally the 1912 general election in the nineteenth senatorial district was deemed a victory for Democrat Mack C. Goodwin. Goodwin would serve for a month in 1913. However, the senators would remove Goodwin and replace him with Republican Clem F. Kimball following Kimball's contestation of the results.

=== District 23 ===
Iowa Senate, District 23 Republican primary election, 1912
Party	Candidate	Votes	%
Republican	George Hilsinger	998	59.23%
Republican	S. D. Helde	687	40.77%
Total votes		1,685	100.00%

Iowa Senate, District 23 Democratic primary election, 1912
Party	Candidate	Votes	%
Democratic	Owen McCaffrey	443	29.95%
Democratic	W. P. Dunlap	393	26.57%
Democratic	James W. Ellis	349	23.60%
Democratic	Lyman B. Parshall (incumbent)	294	19.88%
Total votes		1,479	100.00%

Iowa Senate, District 23 general election, 1912
Party	Candidate	Votes	%
Republican	George E. Hilsinger	2,265	49.65%
Democratic	Owen McCaffrey	2,218	48.62%
Socialist	Z. M. Holcomb	79	1.73%
Total votes		4,562	100.00%
Republican gain from Democratic			

=== District 24 ===
Iowa Senate, District 24 general election, 1912
Party	Candidate	Votes	%
Democratic	William D. Sheean	4,369	53.73%
Republican	H. R. Chapman (incumbent)	3,763	46.27%
Total votes		8,132	100.00%
Democratic gain from Republican			

=== District 25 ===
Iowa Senate, District 25 Republican primary election, 1912
Party	Candidate	Votes	%
Republican	E. D. Murphy	123	89.78%
Republican	Thomas Williams	14	10.22%
Total votes		137	100.00%

Iowa Senate, District 25 Democratic primary election, 1912
Party	Candidate	Votes	%
Democratic	James A. White (incumbent)	1,355	55.46%
Democratic	Thomas Stapleton	1,088	44.54%
Total votes		2,443	100.00%

Iowa Senate, District 25 general election, 1912
Party	Candidate	Votes	%
Democratic	James A. White (incumbent)	5,330	59.12%
Republican	E. D. Murphy	3,685	40.88%
Total votes		9,015	100.00%
Democratic hold			

=== District 26 ===
Iowa Senate, District 26 Republican primary election, 1912
Party	Candidate	Votes	%
Republican	Francis A. Heald	3,327	72.83%
Republican	John McAllister	1,241	27.17%
Total votes		4,568	100.00%

Iowa Senate, District 26 general election, 1912
Party	Candidate	Votes	%
Republican	Francis A. Heald	6,743	55.32%
Democratic	M. G. Bryan	4,172	34.23%
Progressive	James M. Sword	702	5.76%
Socialist	P. W. Hynes	384	3.15%
Prohibition	Hugh Boyd	188	1.54%
Total votes		12,189	100.00%
Republican hold			

=== District 27 ===
Iowa Senate, District 27 general election, 1912
Party	Candidate	Votes	%
Republican	Frederic Larrabee (incumbent)	5,434	63.16%
Democratic	Thomas Tolen	3,169	36.84%
Total votes		8,603	100.00%
Republican hold			

=== District 28 ===
Iowa Senate, District 28 general election, 1912
Party	Candidate	Votes	%
Republican	Wallace H. Arney	2,723	48.28%
Democratic	William Shipton	2,511	44.52%
Socialist	Myron F. Wiltse	253	4.49%
Prohibition	E. H. Brown	153	2.71%
Total votes		5,640	100.00%
Republican hold			

=== District 31 ===
Iowa Senate, District 31 Republican primary election, 1912
Party	Candidate	Votes	%
Republican	Justin R. Doran	2,926	52.37%
Republican	William W. Goodykoontz	2,661	47.63%
Total votes		5,587	100.00%

Iowa Senate, District 31 general election, 1912
Party	Candidate	Votes	%
Republican	Justin R. Doran	5,611	63.19%
Democratic	Edward C. Jordan	2,513	28.30%
Socialist	A. F. Schrader	508	5.72%
Prohibition	Fred T. Stevenson	247	2.78%
Total votes		8,879	100.00%
Republican hold			

=== District 32 ===
Iowa Senate, District 32 general election, 1912
Party	Candidate	Votes	%
Democratic	E. P. Farr	4,251	36.81%
Republican	Robert Hunter (incumbent)	4,020	34.81%
Progressive	Charles J. Holman	2,921	25.29%
Socialist	Mort. M. Curtis	356	3.08%
Total votes		11,548	100.00%
Democratic gain from Republican			

=== District 33 ===
Iowa Senate, District 33 general election, 1912
Party	Candidate	Votes	%
Republican	Eli C. Perkins	3,745	70.41%
Progressive	Daniel H. Young	1,492	28.05%
Socialist	Charles Root	82	1.54%
Total votes		5,319	100.00%
Republican hold			

=== District 36 ===
Iowa Senate, District 36 general election, 1912
Party	Candidate	Votes	%
Democratic	Robert Quigley (incumbent)	3,054	57.72%
Republican	L. S. Fisher	2,237	42.28%
Total votes		5,291	100.00%
Democratic hold			

=== District 39 ===
Iowa Senate, District 39 general election, 1912
Party	Candidate	Votes	%
Republican	Charles Gates (incumbent)	3,226	53.22%
Democratic	O. H. Mitchell	2,836	46.78%
Total votes		6,062	100.00%
Republican hold			

=== District 40 ===
Iowa Senate, District 40 Republican primary election, 1912
Party	Candidate	Votes	%
Republican	Albert M. Fellows	2,431	67.19%
Republican	Edwin H. Fourt	1,187	32.81%
Total votes		3,618	100.00%

Iowa Senate, District 40 Democratic primary election, 1912
Party	Candidate	Votes	%
Democratic	W. C. Earle	169	92.35%
Democratic	C. J. Haas	14	7.65%
Total votes		183	100.00%

Iowa Senate, District 40 general election, 1912
Party	Candidate	Votes	%
Republican	Albert M. Fellows	5,185	57.12%
Democratic	W. C. Earle	3,893	42.88%
Total votes		9,078	100.00%
Republican hold			

=== District 41 ===
Iowa Senate, District 41 general election, 1912
Party	Candidate	Votes	%
Republican	Lars W. Boe	4,265	96.93%
Prohibition	E. T. Clark	135	3.07%
Total votes		4,400	100.00%
Republican hold			

=== District 43 ===
Iowa Senate, District 43 general election, 1912
Party	Candidate	Votes	%
Republican	T. J. B. Robinson	5,595	61.99%
Democratic	D. C. Wolf	2,591	28.71%
Progressive	James E. Stinehart	839	9.30%
Total votes		9,025	100.00%
Republican hold			

=== District 46 ===
Iowa Senate, District 46 Republican primary election, 1912
Party	Candidate	Votes	%
Republican	George F. Coburn (Note: Coburn won the Republican primary, but he ran as a Socialist in the general election.)	2,119	53.47%
Republican	J. U. Sammis (incumbent)	1,844	46.53%
Total votes		3,963	100.00%

Iowa Senate, District 46 general election, 1912
Party	Candidate	Votes	%
Democratic	Guy M. Gillette	4,505	50.01%
Socialist	George F. Coburn	4,504	49.99%
Total votes		9,009	100.00%
Democratic gain from Republican			

=== District 47 ===
Iowa Senate, District 47 Democratic primary election, 1912
Party	Candidate	Votes	%
Democratic	Frank Carpenter	672	61.26%
Democratic	Ira L. Breffle	425	38.74%
Total votes		1,097	100.00%

Iowa Senate, District 47 general election, 1912
Party	Candidate	Votes	%
Republican	Leslie E. Francis (incumbent)	6,914	60.62%
Democratic	Frank Carpenter	4,492	39.38%
Total votes		11,406	100.00%
Republican hold			

=== District 49 ===
Iowa Senate, District 49 general election, 1912
Party	Candidate	Votes	%
Republican	Nicholas Balkema (incumbent)	5,846	94.78%
Socialist	B. E. Hunter	322	5.22%
Total votes		6,168	100.00%
Republican hold			

== See also ==
- United States elections, 1912
- United States House of Representatives elections in Iowa, 1912
- Elections in Iowa
