= 1920 Iowa Senate election =

- November 2, 1920

29 out of 50 seats in the Iowa Senate 26 seats needed for a majority
	Majority party	Minority party
Party	Republican	Democratic
Last election	45	5
Seats after	48	2
Seat change	▲3	▼3
- Results; Republican gain Republican hold

The 1920 Iowa Senate elections took place as part of the biennial 1920 United States elections. Iowa voters elected state senators in 29 of the senate's 50 districts. State senators serve four-year terms in the Iowa Senate.

A statewide map of the 50 state Senate districts in the 1920 elections is provided by the Iowa General Assembly here.

The primary election on June 7, 1920, determined which candidates appeared on the November 2, 1920 general election ballot.

Following the previous election, Republicans had control of the Iowa Senate with 45 seats to Democrats' 5 seats.

To claim control of the chamber from Republicans, the Democrats needed to net 21 Senate seats.

Republicans maintained control of the Iowa State Senate following the 1920 general election with the balance of power shifting to Republicans holding 48 seats and Democrats having 2 seats (a net gain of 3 seats for Republicans). Democrats suffered a disastrous performance as they lost every single district up for election, including three held by them.

== Summary of Results ==
- Note: 21 districts with holdover Senators not up for re-election are not listed on this table.

Senate District	Incumbent	Party	Elected Senator	Party
2nd	George Washington Ball	Rep	Charles J. Fulton	Rep
3rd	James M. Wilson	Rep	John J. Ethell	Rep
4th	Karl Miler Le Compte	Rep	James Foster Johnston	Rep
5th	James Allen Stephenson	Dem	John Andrew McIntosh	Rep
6th	Francis Elmer Shane	Rep	John Colborne Tuck	Rep
8th	William C. Ratcliff	Rep	Harman Albert Darting	Rep
11th	Aaron VanScoy Proudfoot	Rep	Lloyd Thurston	Rep
14th	Elmer Ellsworth Mitchell	Rep	Warren Alexander Caldwell	Rep
15th	John Rees Price	Rep	John Rees Price	Rep
16th	Edward McMurray Smith	Rep	Edward McMurray Smith	Rep
17th	John Wasson Foster	Rep	Halleck J. Mantz	Rep
19th	Clement F. Kimball	Rep	William Samuel Baird	Rep
23rd	Albert L. Broxam	Dem	Charles Steere Browne	Rep
24th	John K. Hale	Rep	John K. Hale	Rep
25th	Otto A. Byington	Dem	Charles M. Dutcher	Rep
26th	Willis G. Haskell	Rep	Willis G. Haskell	Rep
27th	Perry C. Holdoegel	Rep	Perry C. Holdoegel	Rep
28th	Wallace H. Arney	Rep	Ray Paul Scott	Rep
31st	Ben Edwards	Rep	Charles Olson	Rep
32nd	Bertel M. Stoddard	Rep	Bertel M. Stoddard	Rep
33rd	Thomas Eddy Taylor	Rep	George Sherman Banta	Rep
36th	Byron W. Newberry	Rep	Byron W. Newberry	Rep
39th	William Thomas Evans	Rep	Oscar Leroy Mead	Rep
40th	Albert M. Fellows	Rep	George S. Hartman	Rep
41st	Thomas A. Kingland	Rep	John Marian Slosson Jr.	Rep
43rd	Arthur Lynnwood Rule	Rep	John E. Wichman	Rep
46th	George Franklin Coburn	Rep	Ed Hoyt Campbell	Rep
47th	Henry C. Adams	Rep	Henry C. Adams	Rep
49th	Nicholas Balkema	Rep	Ben C. Abben	Rep

== Detailed Results ==
- NOTE: The 21 districts that did not hold elections in 1920 are not listed here.
- Note: If a district does not list a primary, then that district did not have a competitive primary (i.e., there may have only been one candidate file for that district).

=== District 2 ===
Iowa Senate, District 2 Republican Primary Election, 1920
Party	Candidate	Votes	%
Republican	Charles J. Fulton	2,599	100.00%
Total votes		2,599	100.00%

Iowa Senate, District 2 Democratic Primary Election, 1920
Party	Candidate	Votes	%
Democratic	Frank B. Whitaker	732	100.00%
Total votes		732	100.00%

Iowa Senate, District 2 General Election, 1920
Party	Candidate	Votes	%
Republican	Charles J. Fulton	7,786	65.64%
Democratic	Frank B. Whitaker	4,076	34.36%
Total votes		11,862	100.00%
Republican hold			

=== District 3 ===
Iowa Senate, District 3 Republican Primary Election, 1920
Party	Candidate	Votes	%
Republican	J. J. Ethell	2,298	61.58%
Republican	Purley Rinker	1,434	38.42%
Total votes		3,732	100.00%

Iowa Senate, District 3 Democratic Primary Election, 1920
Party	Candidate	Votes	%
Democratic	D. C. Bradley	1,428	100.00%
Total votes		1,428	100.00%

Iowa Senate, District 3 General Election, 1920
Party	Candidate	Votes	%
Republican	John J. Ethell	9,439	64.59%
Democratic	D. C. Bradley	5,174	35.41%
Total votes		14,613	100.00%
Republican hold			

=== District 4 ===
Iowa Senate, District 4 Republican Primary Election, 1920
Party	Candidate	Votes	%
Republican	James F. Johnston	1,622	58.73%
Republican	Emory W. Curtis	1,140	41.27%
Total votes		2,762	100.00%

Iowa Senate, District 4 Democratic Primary Election, 1920
Party	Candidate	Votes	%
Democratic	James W. Jeffries	171	93.44%
Democratic	J. N. Jeffries	12	6.56%
Total votes		183	100.00%

Iowa Senate, District 4 General Election, 1920
Party	Candidate	Votes	%
Republican	James F. Johnston	8,261	100.00%
Total votes		8,261	100.00%
Republican hold			

=== District 5 ===
Iowa Senate, District 5 Republican Primary Election, 1920
Party	Candidate	Votes	%
Republican	J. A. McIntosh	2,411	51.09%
Republican	B. L. Eiker	2,308	48.91%
Total votes		4,719	100.00%

Iowa Senate, District 5 Democratic Primary Election, 1920
Party	Candidate	Votes	%
Democratic	J. P. Daughton	439	100.00%
Total votes		439	100.00%

Iowa Senate, District 5 General Election, 1920
Party	Candidate	Votes	%
Republican	J. A. McIntosh	11,392	62.05%
Democratic	J. P. Daughton	6,936	37.95%
Total votes		18,358	100.00%
Republican gain from Democratic			

=== District 6 ===
Iowa Senate, District 6 Republican Primary Election, 1920
Party	Candidate	Votes	%
Republican	J. C. Tuck	1,430	45.56%
Republican	Fred A. Ohieds	951	30.30%
Republican	V. Loy	758	24.15%
Total votes		3,139	100.00%

Iowa Senate, District 6 Democratic Primary Election, 1920
Party	Candidate	Votes	%
Democratic	Fred Cotter	253	100.00%
Total votes		253	100.00%

Iowa Senate, District 6 General Election, 1920
Party	Candidate	Votes	%
Republican	J. C. Tuck	7,251	64.75%
Democratic	Fred Cotter	3,947	35.25%
Total votes		11,198	100.00%
Republican hold			

=== District 8 ===
Iowa Senate, District 8 Republican Primary Election, 1920
Party	Candidate	Votes	%
Republican	H. A. Darting	1,531	50.11%
Republican	Fred Durbin	1,524	49.89%
Total votes		3,055	100.00%

Iowa Senate, District 8 Democratic Primary Election, 1920
Party	Candidate	Votes	%
Democratic	Frank Allender	111	100.00%
Total votes		111	100.00%

Iowa Senate, District 8 General Election, 1920
Party	Candidate	Votes	%
Republican	H. A. Darting	8,653	100.00%
Total votes		8,653	100.00%
Republican hold			

=== District 11 ===
Iowa Senate, District 11 Republican Primary Election, 1920
Party	Candidate	Votes	%
Republican	Lloyd Thurston	2,602	100.00%
Total votes		2,602	100.00%

Iowa Senate, District 11 Democratic Primary Election, 1920
Party	Candidate	Votes	%
Democratic	M. E. Stansell	119	100.00%
Total votes		119	100.00%

Iowa Senate, District 11 General Election, 1920
Party	Candidate	Votes	%
Republican	Lloyd Thurston	8,343	100.00%
Total votes		8,343	100.00%
Republican hold			

=== District 14 ===
Iowa Senate, District 14 Republican Primary Election, 1920
Party	Candidate	Votes	%
Republican	W. A. Caldwell	930	44.58%
Republican	Thomas J. Wilson	749	35.91%
Republican	Elmer E. Mitchell (incumbent)	407	19.51%
Total votes		2,086	100.00%

Iowa Senate, District 14 Democratic Primary Election, 1920
Party	Candidate	Votes	%
Democratic	N. S. Downey (Note: Name is listed as "N. S. Downey" in the Primary and "M. S. Downey" in the General.)	261	56.86%
Democratic	D. B. Green	198	43.14%
Total votes		459	100.00%

Iowa Senate, District 14 General Election, 1920
Party	Candidate	Votes	%
Republican	W. A. Caldwell	5,882	58.32%
Democratic	M. S. Downey	4,203	41.68%
Total votes		10,085	100.00%
Republican hold			

=== District 15 ===
Iowa Senate, District 15 Republican Primary Election, 1920
Party	Candidate	Votes	%
Republican	John R. Price (incumbent)	2,338	55.25%
Republican	W. G. Vander Ploeg	1,894	44.75%
Total votes		4,232	100.00%

Iowa Senate, District 15 Democratic Primary Election, 1920
Party	Candidate	Votes	%
Democratic	L. R. Clements	1,495	100.00%
Total votes		1,495	100.00%

Iowa Senate, District 15 General Election, 1920
Party	Candidate	Votes	%
Republican	John R. Price (incumbent)	9,293	59.06%
Democratic	L. R. Clements	6,441	40.94%
Total votes		15,734	100.00%
Republican hold			

=== District 16 ===
Iowa Senate, District 16 Republican Primary Election, 1920
Party	Candidate	Votes	%
Republican	Ed. M. Smith (incumbent)	2,289	100.00%
Total votes		2,289	100.00%

Iowa Senate, District 16 Democratic Primary Election, 1920
Party	Candidate	Votes	%
Democratic	Pierre McDermid	420	100.00%
Total votes		420	100.00%

Iowa Senate, District 16 General Election, 1920
Party	Candidate	Votes	%
Republican	Ed. M. Smith (incumbent)	8,114	70.49%
Democratic	Pierre McDermid	3,397	29.51%
Total votes		11,511	100.00%
Republican hold			

=== District 17 ===
Iowa Senate, District 17 Republican Primary Election, 1920
Party	Candidate	Votes	%
Republican	H. J. Mantz	3,360	57.86%
Republican	H. J. Hoogenakker	2,447	42.14%
Total votes		5,807	100.00%

Iowa Senate, District 17 Democratic Primary Election, 1920
Party	Candidate	Votes	%
Democratic	Fred Land	690	100.00%
Total votes		690	100.00%

Iowa Senate, District 17 General Election, 1920
Party	Candidate	Votes	%
Republican	H. J. Mantz	13,256	67.41%
Democratic	Fred Land	6,409	32.59%
Total votes		19,665	100.00%
Republican hold			

=== District 19 ===
Iowa Senate, District 19 Republican Primary Election, 1920
Party	Candidate	Votes	%
Republican	W. S. Baird	1,576	57.08%
Republican	Lewis J. Neff	1,185	42.92%
Total votes		2,761	100.00%

Iowa Senate, District 19 General Election, 1920
Party	Candidate	Votes	%
Republican	W. S. Baird	13,463	86.25%
Independent	Harry O. Richardson	2,147	13.75%
Total votes		15,610	100.00%
Republican hold			

=== District 23 ===
Iowa Senate, District 23 Republican Primary Election, 1920
Party	Candidate	Votes	%
Republican	Charles S. Browne	858	100.00%
Total votes		858	100.00%

Iowa Senate, District 23 Democratic Primary Election, 1920
Party	Candidate	Votes	%
Democratic	A. L. Broxam (incumbent)	393	100.00%
Total votes		393	100.00%

Iowa Senate, District 23 General Election, 1920
Party	Candidate	Votes	%
Republican	Charles Browne	4,160	63.87%
Democratic	A. L. Broxam (incumbent)	2,353	36.13%
Total votes		6,513	100.00%
Republican gain from Democratic			

=== District 24 ===
Iowa Senate, District 24 Republican Primary Election, 1920
Party	Candidate	Votes	%
Republican	J. K. Hale (incumbent)	2,366	100.00%
Total votes		2,366	100.00%

Iowa Senate, District 24 General Election, 1920
Party	Candidate	Votes	%
Republican	J. K. Hale (incumbent)	11,529	100.00%
Total votes		11,529	100.00%
Republican hold			

=== District 25 ===
Iowa Senate, District 25 Republican Primary Election, 1920
Party	Candidate	Votes	%
Republican	Charles M. Dutcher	1,877	100.00%
Total votes		1,877	100.00%

Iowa Senate, District 25 Democratic Primary Election, 1920
Party	Candidate	Votes	%
Democratic	E. A. Baldwin	1,281	100.00%
Total votes		1,281	100.00%

Iowa Senate, District 25 General Election, 1920
Party	Candidate	Votes	%
Republican	Charles M. Dutcher	10,420	59.58%
Democratic	E. A. Baldwin	7,068	40.42%
Total votes		17,488	100.00%
Republican gain from Democratic			

=== District 26 ===
Iowa Senate, District 26 Republican Primary Election, 1920
Party	Candidate	Votes	%
Republican	W. G. Haskell (incumbent)	5,579	100.00%
Total votes		5,579	100.00%

Iowa Senate, District 26 General Election, 1920
Party	Candidate	Votes	%
Republican	W. G. Haskell (incumbent)	20,045	100.00%
Total votes		20,045	100.00%
Republican hold			

=== District 27 ===
Iowa Senate, District 27 Republican Primary Election, 1920
Party	Candidate	Votes	%
Republican	Perry C. Holdoegel (incumbent)	3,445	100.00%
Total votes		3,445	100.00%

Iowa Senate, District 27 General Election, 1920
Party	Candidate	Votes	%
Republican	Perry C. Holdoegel (incumbent)	13,144	100.00%
Total votes		13,144	100.00%
Republican hold			

=== District 28 ===
Iowa Senate, District 28 Republican Primary Election, 1920
Party	Candidate	Votes	%
Republican	H. C. Lounsberry	1,102	32.93%
Republican	Ray P. Scott (Note: Despite placing in second in the Primary, Scott would go on to the General.)	903	26.99%
Republican	G. F. Stansberry	735	21.97%
Republican	D. N. Ferguson	606	18.11%
Total votes		3,346	100.00%

Iowa Senate, District 28 Democratic Primary Election, 1920
Party	Candidate	Votes	%
Democratic	Robert E. Johnson	173	100.00%
Total votes		173	100.00%

Iowa Senate, District 28 General Election, 1920
Party	Candidate	Votes	%
Republican	Ray P. Scott	8,249	73.06%
Democratic	Robert E. Johnson	3,041	26.94%
Total votes		11,290	100.00%
Republican hold			

=== District 31 ===
Iowa Senate, District 31 Republican Primary Election, 1920
Party	Candidate	Votes	%
Republican	Charles Olson	2,681	41.09%
Republican	Martin J. Lockard	2,017	30.92%
Republican	Justin R. Doran	1,826	27.99%
Total votes		6,524	100.00%

Iowa Senate, District 31 Democratic Primary Election, 1920
Party	Candidate	Votes	%
Democratic	Joseph A. Judge	361	100.00%
Total votes		361	100.00%

Iowa Senate, District 31 General Election, 1920
Party	Candidate	Votes	%
Republican	Charles Olson	14,632	75.54%
Democratic	Joseph A. Judge	4,739	24.46%
Total votes		19,371	100.00%
Republican hold			

=== District 32 ===
Iowa Senate, District 32 Republican Primary Election, 1920
Party	Candidate	Votes	%
Republican	B. M. Stoddard (incumbent)	4,097	100.00%
Total votes		4,097	100.00%

Iowa Senate, District 32 General Election, 1920
Party	Candidate	Votes	%
Republican	B. M. Stoddard (incumbent)	18,136	100.00%
Total votes		18,136	100.00%
Republican hold			

=== District 33 ===
Iowa Senate, District 33 Republican Primary Election, 1920
Party	Candidate	Votes	%
Republican	George S. Banta	2,169	59.33%
Republican	S. W. Klaus	1,487	40.67%
Total votes		3,656	100.00%

Iowa Senate, District 33 Democratic Primary Election, 1920
Party	Candidate	Votes	%
Democratic	Rudolph Leytze	398	100.00%
Total votes		398	100.00%

Iowa Senate, District 33 General Election, 1920
Party	Candidate	Votes	%
Republican	George S. Banta	11,272	77.26%
Democratic	Rudolph Leytze	3,317	22.74%
Total votes		14,589	100.00%
Republican hold			

=== District 36 ===
Iowa Senate, District 36 Republican Primary Election, 1920
Party	Candidate	Votes	%
Republican	Byron W. Newberry (incumbent)	1,407	100.00%
Total votes		1,407	100.00%

Iowa Senate, District 36 Democratic Primary Election, 1920
Party	Candidate	Votes	%
Democratic	P. W. Connelly	70	100.00%
Total votes		70	100.00%

Iowa Senate, District 36 General Election, 1920
Party	Candidate	Votes	%
Republican	Byron W. Newberry (incumbent)	5,832	78.24%
Independent	P. N. Conley	1,622	21.76%
Total votes		7,454	100.00%
Republican hold			

=== District 39 ===
Iowa Senate, District 39 Republican Primary Election, 1920
Party	Candidate	Votes	%
Republican	O. L. Mead	2,052	59.05%
Republican	W. W. Saylor	1,423	40.95%
Total votes		3,475	100.00%

Iowa Senate, District 39 Democratic Primary Election, 1920
Party	Candidate	Votes	%
Democratic	H. J. Feyereison	249	100.00%
Total votes		249	100.00%

Iowa Senate, District 39 General Election, 1920
Party	Candidate	Votes	%
Republican	O. L. Mead	10,282	100.00%
Total votes		10,282	100.00%
Republican hold			

=== District 40 ===
Iowa Senate, District 40 Republican Primary Election, 1920
Party	Candidate	Votes	%
Republican	G. S. Hartman	1,202	21.38%
Republican	W. W. Comstock	1,175	20.90%
Republican	Joe Reilly	1,082	19.24%
Republican	A. E. Anderson	1,072	19.06%
Republican	Gus Gunderson	739	13.14%
Republican	W. H. Walrath	353	6.28%
Total votes		5,623	100.00%

Iowa Senate, District 40 Democratic Primary Election, 1920
Party	Candidate	Votes	%
Democratic	Reed H. McIlree	616	100.00%
Total votes		616	100.00%

Iowa Senate, District 40 General Election, 1920
Party	Candidate	Votes	%
Republican	George S. Hartman	12,152	73.15%
Democratic	Reed H. McIlree	4,460	26.85%
Total votes		16,612	100.00%
Republican hold			

=== District 41 ===
Iowa Senate, District 41 Republican Primary Election, 1920
Party	Candidate	Votes	%
Republican	J. M. Slosson	4,636	100.00%
Total votes		4,636	100.00%

Iowa Senate, District 41 Democratic Primary Election, 1920
Party	Candidate	Votes	%
Democratic	R. C. Plummer	28	100.00%
Total votes		28	100.00%

Iowa Senate, District 41 General Election, 1920
Party	Candidate	Votes	%
Republican	J. M. Slosson	11,323	100.00%
Total votes		11,323	100.00%
Republican hold			

=== District 43 ===
Iowa Senate, District 43 Republican Primary Election, 1920
Party	Candidate	Votes	%
Republican	John E. Wichman	4,168	54.98%
Republican	W. P. Chambers	3,413	45.02%
Total votes		7,581	100.00%

Iowa Senate, District 43 General Election, 1920
Party	Candidate	Votes	%
Republican	John E. Wichman	15,754	100.00%
Total votes		15,754	100.00%
Republican hold			

=== District 46 ===
Iowa Senate, District 46 Republican Primary Election, 1920
Party	Candidate	Votes	%
Republican	Ed. H. Campbell	2,446	51.85%
Republican	George F. Coburn (incumbent)	2,271	48.15%
Total votes		4,717	100.00%

Iowa Senate, District 46 General Election, 1920
Party	Candidate	Votes	%
Republican	Ed. H. Campbell	13,470	100.00%
Total votes		13,470	100.00%
Republican hold			

=== District 47 ===
Iowa Senate, District 47 Republican Primary Election, 1920
Party	Candidate	Votes	%
Republican	Henry C. Adams (incumbent)	4,098	48.63%
Republican	D. E. Kulp	2,766	32.82%
Republican	H. Leslie Wildey	1,563	18.55%
Total votes		8,427	100.00%

Iowa Senate, District 47 General Election, 1920
Party	Candidate	Votes	%
Republican	Henry C. Adams (incumbent)	20,698	100.00%
Total votes		20,698	100.00%
Republican hold			

=== District 49 ===
Iowa Senate, District 49 Republican Primary Election, 1920
Party	Candidate	Votes	%
Republican	Ben C. Abben Jr.	3,222	51.30%
Republican	E. L. Richards	3,059	48.70%
Total votes		6,281	100.00%

Iowa Senate, District 49 General Election, 1920
Party	Candidate	Votes	%
Republican	Ben C. Abben, Jr.	16,962	100.00%
Total votes		16,962	100.00%
Republican hold			

== See also ==
- United States elections, 1920
- United States House of Representatives elections in Iowa, 1920
- Elections in Iowa
