= 1908 Iowa Senate election =

- November 3, 1908

29 out of 50 seats in the Iowa Senate 26 seats needed for a majority
	Majority party	Minority party
Party	Republican	Democratic
Last election	36	14
Seats after	34	16
Seat change	▼2	▲2
- Results; Democratic gain Republican gain Democratic hold Republican hold

The 1908 Iowa Senate elections took place as part of the biennial 1908 United States elections. Iowa voters elected state senators in 29 of the senate's 50 districts. State senators serve four-year terms in the Iowa Senate.

A statewide map of the 50 state Senate districts in the 1908 elections is provided by the Iowa General Assembly here.

The 1908 elections were the first in Iowa with primary elections due to the enactment of the Primary Election Law by the General Assembly in 1907. The primary election on June 2, 1908, determined which candidates would appear on the general election ballot on November 3, 1908.

Following the previous election, Republicans had control of the Iowa Senate with 36 seats to Democrats' 14 seats.

To claim control of the chamber from Republicans, the Democrats needed to net 12 Senate seats.

Republicans maintained control of the Iowa State Senate following the 1908 general election with the balance of power shifting to Republicans holding 34 seats and Democrats having 16 seats (a net gain of 2 seats for Democrats).

== Results ==
- Note: 21 districts with holdover Senators not up for re-election are not listed on this table.

Senate district	Incumbent	Party	Elected Senator	Party
2nd	James Elerick	Rep	William Sylvester Allen	Rep
3rd	Lewis Leroy Taylor	Dem	Lewis Leroy Taylor	Dem
4th	John Alexander McKlveen	Rep	George McCulloch	Rep
5th	Marion Floyd Stookey	Rep	John Dana Brown	Rep
6th	Daniel Webster Turner	Rep	Theophilus W. Bennett	Rep
8th	Shirley Gillilland	Rep	Shirley Gillilland	Rep
11th	James H. Jamison	Rep	Aaron VanScoy Proudfoot	Rep
14th	William G. Jones	Rep	John Fletcher Ream	Dem
15th	James L. Warren	Rep	John Thomas Clarkson	Dem
16th	James Judson Crossley	Rep	Arthur Craig Savage	Rep
17th	Frank M. Hopkins	Rep	George Cosson	Rep
19th	Charles George Saunders	Rep	Charles George Saunders	Rep
23rd	Thomas Lambert	Dem	Lyman Bradley Parshall	Dem
24th	Robert C. Stirton	Dem	Horace Ray Chapman	Rep
25th	John Hughes	Rep	James A. White	Dem
26th	Willard Coldren Stuckslager	Rep	Willard Coldren Stuckslager	Rep
27th	Henry Young	Rep	Frederic Larrabee	Rep
28th	Charles Eckles	Rep	Comfort Harvey Van Law	Rep
31st	Charles J. A. Ericson	Rep	Joseph Andrew Fitchpatrick	Rep
32nd	John H. Jackson	Rep	Robert Hunter	Rep
33rd	George W. Dunham	Rep	Edwin Hiram Hoyt	Rep
36th	Byron W. Newberry	Rep	Robert Pollok Quigley	Dem
39th	John F. Wade	Dem	Charles Gates	Rep
40th	Archibald C. Wilson	Rep	Henry L. Adams	Rep
41st	James Albert Smith	Rep	James Albert Smith	Rep
43rd	Abner H. Gale	Rep	John Hammill	Rep
46th	John L. Bleakly	Rep	James Uriah Sammis	Rep
47th	George Kinne	Rep	Leslie E. Francis	Rep
49th	William C. Kimmel	Rep	Nicholas Balkema	Rep

== Detailed results ==
Popular vote share by district: Democratic 40–49% 50–59% / Republican 40–49% 50–59% 60–69% 70–79% 90–100%

- Note: The 21 districts that did not hold elections in 1908 are not listed here.
- Note: If a district does not list a primary, then that district did not have a competitive primary (i.e., there may have only been one candidate who filed for that district).

=== District 2 ===
Iowa Senate, District 2 Republican primary election, 1908
Party	Candidate	Votes	%
Republican	William S. Allen	1,397	51.12%
Republican	James Elerick (incumbent)	1,336	48.88%
Total votes		2,733	100.00%

Iowa Senate, District 2 general election, 1908
Party	Candidate	Votes	%
Republican	William S. Allen	3,850	51.53%
Democratic	J. Fred Clarke	3,421	45.78%
Prohibition	J. W. Wolf	201	2.69%
Total votes		7,472	100.00%
Republican hold			

=== District 3 ===
Iowa Senate, District 3 general election, 1908
Party	Candidate	Votes	%
Democratic	L. L. Taylor (incumbent)	4,240	49.71%
Republican	W. H. McAckran	4,014	47.06%
Socialist	James Mangnall	275	3.22%
Total votes		8,529	100.00%
Democratic hold			

=== District 4 ===
Iowa Senate, District 4 Republican primary election, 1908
Party	Candidate	Votes	%
Republican	George McCulloch	1,334	56.98%
Republican	S. H. Moore	1,007	43.02%
Total votes		2,341	100.00%

Iowa Senate, District 4 general election, 1908
Party	Candidate	Votes	%
Republican	George McCulloch	3,335	49.23%
Democratic	Hardin L. Exley	3,301	48.73%
Prohibition	William Mumma	138	2.04%
Total votes		6,774	100.00%
Republican hold			

=== District 5 ===
Iowa Senate, District 5 general election, 1908
Party	Candidate	Votes	%
Republican	J. D. Brown	5,787	54.32%
Democratic	Fred A. Bowman	4,800	45.05%
Socialist	James Pierson	67	0.63%
Total votes		10,654	100.00%
Republican hold			

=== District 6 ===
Iowa Senate, District 6 Republican primary election, 1908
Party	Candidate	Votes	%
Republican	T. W. Bennett	1,580	52.42%
Republican	G. H. Van Houten	1,434	47.58%
Total votes		3,014	100.00%

Iowa Senate, District 6 Democratic primary election, 1908
Party	Candidate	Votes	%
Democratic	G. E. Patton	450	51.43%
Democratic	R. G. Weisell	425	48.57%
Total votes		875	100.00%

Iowa Senate, District 6 general election, 1908
Party	Candidate	Votes	%
Republican	T. W. Bennett	3,778	56.05%
Democratic	G. E. Patton	2,963	43.95%
Total votes		6,741	100.00%
Republican hold			

=== District 8 ===
Iowa Senate, District 8 general election, 1908
Party	Candidate	Votes	%
Republican	Shirley Gillilland (incumbent)	3,724	54.62%
Democratic	W. S. Reiley	3,094	45.38%
Total votes		6,818	100.00%
Republican hold			

=== District 11 ===
Iowa Senate, District 11 general election, 1908
Party	Candidate	Votes	%
Republican	A. V. Proudfoot	4,121	60.54%
Democratic	Bert I. Davis	2,686	39.46%
Total votes		6,807	100.00%
Republican hold			

=== District 14 ===
Iowa Senate, District 14 Republican primary election, 1908
Party	Candidate	Votes	%
Republican	A. F. N. Hambleton	918	51.81%
Republican	W. G. Jones (incumbent)	854	48.19%
Total votes		1,772	100.00%

Iowa Senate, District 14 general election, 1908
Party	Candidate	Votes	%
Democratic	John F. Ream	3,096	48.07%
Republican	A. F. N. Hambleton	3,048	47.33%
Prohibition	W. R. Gilmore	296	4.60%
Total votes		6,440	100.00%
Democratic gain from Republican			

=== District 15 ===
Iowa Senate, District 15 Republican primary election, 1908
Party	Candidate	Votes	%
Republican	F. D. Everett	2,038	63.85%
Republican	C. M. Forrest	1,154	36.15%
Total votes		3,192	100.00%

Iowa Senate, District 15 Socialist primary election, 1908
Party	Candidate	Votes	%
Socialist	Francis J. West	37	64.91%
Socialist	John A. Evans	20	35.09%
Total votes		57	100.00%

Iowa Senate, District 15 general election, 1908
Party	Candidate	Votes	%
Democratic	John T. Clarkson	4,823	48.30%
Republican	Fred D. Everett	4,714	47.21%
Socialist	Francis J. West	449	4.50%
Total votes		9,986	100.00%
Democratic gain from Republican			

=== District 16 ===
Iowa Senate, District 16 Republican primary election, 1908
Party	Candidate	Votes	%
Republican	A. C. Savage	1,769	54.53%
Republican	J. C. Hoyt	1,475	45.47%
Total votes		3,244	100.00%

Iowa Senate, District 16 general election, 1908
Party	Candidate	Votes	%
Republican	Arthur Savage	4,263	59.87%
Democratic	George M. Pratt	2,703	37.96%
Prohibition	Ed. L. Tracy	154	2.16%
Total votes		7,120	100.00%
Republican hold			

=== District 17 ===
Iowa Senate, District 17 Republican primary election, 1908
Party	Candidate	Votes	%
Republican	George Cosson	2,870	54.21%
Republican	W. C. Elliott	2,424	45.79%
Total votes		5,294	100.00%

Iowa Senate, District 17 general election, 1908
Party	Candidate	Votes	%
Republican	George Cosson	6,991	62.90%
Democratic	J. S. McLuen	4,123	37.10%
Total votes		11,114	100.00%
Republican hold			

=== District 19 ===
Iowa Senate, District 19 Republican primary election, 1908
Party	Candidate	Votes	%
Republican	Charles G. Saunders (incumbent)	2,350	56.19%
Republican	G. H. Scott	1,832	43.81%
Total votes		4,182	100.00%

Iowa Senate, District 19 Democratic primary election, 1908
Party	Candidate	Votes	%
Democratic	Samuel B. Wadsworth	515	51.55%
Democratic	James M. Coons	484	48.45%
Total votes		999	100.00%

Iowa Senate, District 19 general election, 1908
Party	Candidate	Votes	%
Republican	Charles G. Saunders (incumbent)	5,729	50.79%
Democratic	Samuel B. Wadsworth	5,403	47.90%
Prohibition	Henry Graves	147	1.30%
Total votes		11,279	100.00%
Republican hold			

=== District 23 ===
Iowa Senate, District 23 general election, 1908
Party	Candidate	Votes	%
Democratic	L. B. Parshall	2,497	51.51%
Republican	A. B. Bowen	2,351	48.49%
Total votes		4,848	100.00%
Democratic hold			

=== District 24 ===
Iowa Senate, District 24 Republican primary election, 1908
Party	Candidate	Votes	%
Republican	H. R. Chapman	859	35.66%
Republican	Louis J. Leech	796	33.04%
Republican	D. H. Snoke	754	31.30%
Total votes		2,409	100.00%

Iowa Senate, District 24 general election, 1908
Party	Candidate	Votes	%
Republican	H. R. Chapman	4,378	50.43%
Democratic	R. M. Peet	4,303	49.57%
Total votes		8,681	100.00%
Republican gain from Democratic			

=== District 25 ===
Iowa Senate, District 25 Republican primary election, 1908
Party	Candidate	Votes	%
Republican	David Brant	1,206	54.57%
Republican	Frank K. Stebbins	1,004	45.43%
Total votes		2,210	100.00%

Iowa Senate, District 25 Democratic primary election, 1908
Party	Candidate	Votes	%
Democratic	J. A. White	874	36.72%
Democratic	Thomas Stapleton	874	36.72%
Democratic	J. M. Dower	632	26.55%
Total votes		2,380	100.00%

Iowa Senate, District 25 general election, 1908
Party	Candidate	Votes	%
Democratic	J. A. White	5,520	54.61%
Republican	David Brant	4,490	44.42%
Prohibition	F. J. Wilson	98	0.97%
Total votes		10,108	100.00%
Democratic gain from Republican			

=== District 26 ===
Iowa Senate, District 26 general election, 1908
Party	Candidate	Votes	%
Republican	W. C. Stuckslager (incumbent)	6,424	55.83%
Democratic	T. J. Davis	4,888	42.48%
Prohibition	Hugh Boyd	191	1.66%
Unknown (Note: The Iowa Official Register does not list a party for this candidate.)	W. A. Burgess	4	0.03%
Total votes		11,507	100.00%
Republican hold			

=== District 27 ===
Iowa Senate, District 27 Republican primary election, 1908
Party	Candidate	Votes	%
Republican	Frederic Larrabee	2,538	58.83%
Republican	D. J. Townsend	1,776	41.17%
Total votes		4,314	100.00%

Iowa Senate, District 27 general election, 1908
Party	Candidate	Votes	%
Republican	Frederic Larrabee	5,709	93.82%
Prohibition	J. W. Wonders	202	3.32%
Unknown	John W. Anderson	133	2.19%
Unknown	J. W. Hogans	31	0.51%
Unknown	J. W. Hakes	10	0.16%
Total votes		6,085	100.00%
Republican hold			

=== District 28 ===
Iowa Senate, District 28 Republican primary election, 1908
Party	Candidate	Votes	%
Republican	C. H. Van Law	1,725	55.77%
Republican	O. L. Ingledue	1,368	44.23%
Total votes		3,093	100.00%

Iowa Senate, District 28 general election, 1908
Party	Candidate	Votes	%
Republican	C. H. Van Law	3,313	58.43%
Democratic	James Stanton	1,858	32.77%
Prohibition	Frank T. Swearingen	333	5.87%
Socialist	Charles M. Landon	166	2.93%
Total votes		5,670	100.00%
Republican hold			

=== District 31 ===
Iowa Senate, District 31 general election, 1908
Party	Candidate	Votes	%
Republican	Joseph A. Fitchpatrick	6,771	71.80%
Democratic	J. M. Bricker	2,660	28.20%
Total votes		9,431	100.00%
Republican hold			

=== District 32 ===
Iowa Senate, District 32 Republican primary election, 1908
Party	Candidate	Votes	%
Republican	Robert Hunter	2,712	60.23%
Republican	John H. Jackson (incumbent)	1,791	39.77%
Total votes		4,503	100.00%

Iowa Senate, District 32 general election, 1908
Party	Candidate	Votes	%
Republican	Robert Hunter	6,019	53.24%
Democratic	F. E. Gill	4,944	43.73%
Socialist	John L. Burke	172	1.52%
Prohibition	Jens P. Pedersen	170	1.50%
Total votes		11,305	100.00%
Republican hold			

=== District 33 ===
Iowa Senate, District 33 general election, 1908
Party	Candidate	Votes	%
Republican	E. H. Hoyt	4,823	60.51%
Democratic	John Reilly	3,148	39.49%
Total votes		7,971	100.00%
Republican hold			

=== District 36 ===
Iowa Senate, District 36 general election, 1908
Party	Candidate	Votes	%
Democratic	Robert Quigley	2,899	52.09%
Republican	Byron W. Newberry (incumbent)	2,666	47.91%
Total votes		5,565	100.00%
Democratic gain from Republican			

=== District 39 ===
Iowa Senate, District 39 Republican primary election, 1908
Party	Candidate	Votes	%
Republican	Charles Gates	1,766	64.36%
Republican	George A. McIntyre	978	35.64%
Total votes		2,744	100.00%

Iowa Senate, District 39 general election, 1908
Party	Candidate	Votes	%
Republican	Charles Gates	3,603	54.79%
Democratic	John F. Wade (incumbent)	2,973	45.21%
Total votes		6,576	100.00%
Republican gain from Democratic			

=== District 40 ===
Iowa Senate, District 40 Republican primary election, 1908
Party	Candidate	Votes	%
Republican	Henry L. Adams	1,781	50.52%
Republican	A. C. Wilson (incumbent)	1,744	49.48%
Total votes		3,525	100.00%

Iowa Senate, District 40 general election, 1908
Party	Candidate	Votes	%
Republican	Henry L. Adams	4,951	52.26%
Democratic	C. R. Brown	4,374	46.17%
Prohibition	S. B. Finney	148	1.56%
Total votes		9,473	100.00%
Republican hold			

=== District 41 ===
Iowa Senate, District 41 general election, 1908
Party	Candidate	Votes	%
Republican	James A. Smith (incumbent)	4,994	100.00%
Total votes		4,994	100.00%
Republican hold			

=== District 43 ===
Iowa Senate, District 43 Republican primary election, 1908
Party	Candidate	Votes	%
Republican	John Hammill	2,892	52.62%
Republican	John H. Stevens	1,979	36.01%
Republican	Daniel D. Howe	625	11.37%
Total votes		5,496	100.00%

Iowa Senate, District 43 general election, 1908
Party	Candidate	Votes	%
Republican	John Hammill	6,498	73.57%
Democratic	H. C. Liggett	2,334	26.43%
Total votes		8,832	100.00%
Republican hold			

=== District 46 ===
Iowa Senate, District 46 Republican primary election, 1908
Party	Candidate	Votes	%
Republican	J. U. Sammis	1,822	51.12%
Republican	George F. Coburn	1,742	48.88%
Total votes		3,564	100.00%

Iowa Senate, District 46 general election, 1908
Party	Candidate	Votes	%
Republican	J. U. Sammis	5,798	72.47%
Democratic	A. M. Bilby	2,202	27.53%
Total votes		8,000	100.00%
Republican hold			

=== District 47 ===
Iowa Senate, District 47 Republican primary election, 1908
Party	Candidate	Votes	%
Republican	L. E. Francis	4,024	62.99%
Republican	G. E. Boyle	2,364	37.01%
Total votes		6,388	100.00%

Iowa Senate, District 47 general election, 1908
Party	Candidate	Votes	%
Republican	L. E. Francis	8,658	98.91%
Socialist	Edwin Anderson	95	1.09%
Total votes		8,753	100.00%
Republican hold			

=== District 49 ===
Iowa Senate, District 49 Republican primary election, 1908
Party	Candidate	Votes	%
Republican	Nicholas Balkema	3,213	58.49%
Republican	Anthony Te Paske	2,280	41.51%
Total votes		5,493	100.00%

Iowa Senate, District 49 general election, 1908
Party	Candidate	Votes	%
Republican	Nicholas Balkema	7,148	97.01%
Socialist	G. A. F. de Lespinasse	220	2.99%
Total votes		7,368	100.00%
Republican hold			

== See also ==
- United States elections, 1908
- United States House of Representatives elections in Iowa, 1908
- Elections in Iowa
