= 1924 Iowa Senate election =

- November 4, 1924

29 out of 50 seats in the Iowa Senate 26 seats needed for a majority
	Majority party	Minority party
Party	Republican	Democratic
Last election	47	3
Seats before	46 (Note: In a special election in the 37th district, Republican Daniel Cady Chase was replaced by Democrat William Schmedika, which flipped the seat to the Democrats. Schmedika later changed his party affiliation to Independent.)	4
Seats after	45	5
Seat change	▼1	▲1
- Results; Democratic gain Republican hold

The 1924 Iowa Senate elections took place as part of the biennial 1924 United States elections. Iowa voters elected state senators in 29 of the senate's 50 districts. State senators serve four-year terms in the Iowa Senate.

A statewide map of the 50 state Senate districts in the 1924 elections is provided by the Iowa General Assembly here.

The primary election on June 2, 1924, determined which candidates appeared on the November 4, 1924 general election ballot.

Following the previous election, Republicans had control of the Iowa Senate with 47 seats to Democrats' 3 seats. A special election in district 37 in 1923 saw the seat flip from Republican to Democratic control.

To claim control of the chamber from Republicans, the Democrats needed to net 22 Senate seats.

Republicans maintained control of the Iowa State Senate following the 1924 general election with the balance of power shifting to Republicans holding 45 seats and Democrats having 5 seats (a net gain of 1 seat for Democrats). In 1925, Senator Schmedika of the 37th district would switch his political party affiliation from Democrat to Independent.

== Summary of Results ==
- Note: 21 districts with holdover Senators not up for re-election are not listed on this table.

Senate District	Incumbent	Party	Elected Senator	Party
2nd	Charles J. Fulton	Rep	Charles J. Fulton	Rep
3rd	John Jesse Ethell	Rep	Lloyd Ellis	Dem
4th	James Foster Johnston	Rep	Allen Gilbert Dotts	Rep
5th	John Andrew McIntosh	Rep	Henry Guy Roberts	Rep
6th	John Colborne Tuck	Rep	Samuel Edwin Fackler	Rep
8th	Harman Albert Darting	Rep	Harman Albert Darting	Rep
11th	Lloyd Thurston	Rep	Charles B. Kern	Rep
14th	Warren Alexander Caldwell	Rep	Forrester Call Stanley	Rep
15th	John Rees Price	Rep	William Alexander Clark	Rep
16th	Edward McMurray Smith	Rep	John N. Langfitt	Rep
17th	Halleck J. Mantz	Rep	Redfield Clipper Mills	Rep
19th	William Samuel Baird	Rep	William Samuel Baird	Rep
23rd	Charles Steere Browne	Rep	Charles Steere Browne	Rep
24th	John K. Hale	Rep	Charles Longley Rigby	Rep
25th	Charles M. Dutcher	Rep	George Marchant Clearman	Rep
26th	Willis G. Haskell	Rep	Willis G. Haskell	Rep
27th	Perry C. Holdoegel	Rep	Emmett E. Cavanaugh	Rep
28th	Ray Paul Scott	Rep	William E. McLeland	Rep
31st	Charles Olson	Rep	Lars Johan Skromme	Rep
32nd	Bertel Morgan Stoddard	Rep	Bertel Morgan Stoddard	Rep
33rd	George Sherman Banta	Rep	George F. Slemmons	Rep
36th	Byron W. Newberry	Rep	Charles Augustus Benson	Rep
39th	Oscar Leroy Mead	Rep	John M. Ramsey	Rep
40th	George S. Hartman	Rep	George S. Hartman	Rep
41st	John Marian Slosson Jr.	Rep	Otto E. Gunderson	Rep
43rd	John E. Wichman	Rep	Charles Frederic Johnston	Rep
46th	Ed Hoyt Campbell	Rep	Ed Hoyt Campbell	Rep
47th	Henry C. Adams	Rep	William John Breakenridge	Rep
49th	Ben C. Abben	Rep	Herbert E. Dean	Rep

== Detailed Results ==
- NOTE: The 21 districts that did not hold elections in 1924 are not listed here.
- Note: If a district does not list a primary, then that district did not have a competitive primary (i.e., there may have only been one candidate file for that district).

=== District 2 ===
Iowa Senate, District 2 Republican Primary Election, 1924
Party	Candidate	Votes	%
Republican	Charles J. Fulton (incumbent)	1,668	35.93%
Republican	Seth S. Silver	1,352	29.12%
Republican	A. L. Heminger	1,062	22.87%
Republican	J. M. Morrow	561	12.08%
Total votes		4,643	100.00%

Iowa Senate, District 2 General Election, 1924
Party	Candidate	Votes	%
Republican	Charles J. Fulton (incumbent)	6,927	60.72%
Democratic	S. H. Bauman	4,482	39.28%
Total votes		11,409	100.00%
Republican hold			

=== District 3 ===
Iowa Senate, District 3 Republican Primary Election, 1924
Party	Candidate	Votes	%
Republican	C. H. Scott	2,172	38.98%
Republican	Warren T. Daniels	2,113	37.92%
Republican	Purley Rinker	1,287	23.10%
Total votes		5,572	100.00%

Iowa Senate, District 3 General Election, 1924
Party	Candidate	Votes	%
Democratic	Lloyd Ellis	8,462	55.22%
Republican	C. H. Scott	6,861	44.78%
Total votes		15,323	100.00%
Democratic gain from Republican			

=== District 4 ===
Iowa Senate, District 4 General Election, 1924
Party	Candidate	Votes	%
Republican	A. G. Dotts	7,246	64.95%
Democratic	A. F. Jenkins	3,911	35.05%
Total votes		11,157	100.00%
Republican hold			

=== District 5 ===
Iowa Senate, District 5 Republican Primary Election, 1924
Party	Candidate	Votes	%
Republican	H. Guy Roberts	3,437	41.72%
Republican	J. McIntosh (incumbent)	2,588	31.41%
Republican	Harry C. Chittenden	2,214	26.87%
Total votes		8,239	100.00%

Iowa Senate, District 5 General Election, 1924
Party	Candidate	Votes	%
Republican	H. Guy Roberts	10,787	63.61%
Democratic	Mrs. Gertrude Briggs	6,171	36.39%
Total votes		16,958	100.00%
Republican hold			

=== District 6 ===
Iowa Senate, District 6 Democratic Primary Election, 1924
Party	Candidate	Votes	%
Democratic	H. G. Wilcox	575	51.57%
Democratic	Francis Chandler	540	48.43%
Total votes		1,115	100.00%

Iowa Senate, District 6 General Election, 1924
Party	Candidate	Votes	%
Republican	S. E. Fackler	7,081	68.53%
Democratic	H. G. Wilcox	3,251	31.47%
Total votes		10,332	100.00%
Republican hold			

=== District 8 ===
Iowa Senate, District 8 General Election, 1924
Party	Candidate	Votes	%
Republican	H. A. Darting (incumbent)	8,179	73.17%
Democratic	Frank E. Donelan	2,999	26.83%
Total votes		11,178	100.00%
Republican hold			

=== District 11 ===
Iowa Senate, District 11 Republican Primary Election, 1924
Party	Candidate	Votes	%
Republican	C. B. Kern	1,726	35.31%
Republican	O. E. Smith	1,600	32.73%
Republican	W. G. Stanley	1,562	31.96%
Total votes		4,888	100.00%

Iowa Senate, District 11 General Election, 1924
Party	Candidate	Votes	%
Republican	C. B. Kern	7,148	66.80%
Democratic	C. C. Briggs	3,553	33.20%
Total votes		10,701	100.00%
Republican hold			

=== District 14 ===
Iowa Senate, District 14 Republican Primary Election, 1924
Party	Candidate	Votes	%
Republican	F. C. Stanley	1,157	36.26%
Republican	Warren A. Caldwell (incumbent)	1,110	34.79%
Republican	H. L. Porter	924	28.96%
Total votes		3,191	100.00%

Iowa Senate, District 14 Democratic Primary Election, 1924
Party	Candidate	Votes	%
Democratic	Ed De Long	461	49.30%
Democratic	John Edgren	286	30.59%
Democratic	Charles H. Ralston	188	20.11%
Total votes		935	100.00%

Iowa Senate, District 14 General Election, 1924
Party	Candidate	Votes	%
Republican	F. C. Stanley	5,487	60.32%
Democratic	Ed De Long	3,609	39.68%
Total votes		9,096	100.00%
Republican hold			

=== District 15 ===
Iowa Senate, District 15 Republican Primary Election, 1924
Party	Candidate	Votes	%
Republican	W. A. Clark	4,124	50.02%
Republican	Gray Anderson	4,121	49.98%
Total votes		8,245	100.00%

Iowa Senate, District 15 General Election, 1924
Party	Candidate	Votes	%
Republican	W. A. Clark	9,933	62.82%
Democratic	J. H. Templeton	5,880	37.18%
Total votes		15,813	100.00%
Republican hold			

=== District 16 ===
Iowa Senate, District 16 Republican Primary Election, 1924
Party	Candidate	Votes	%
Republican	John C. Hoyt	1,687	34.46%
Republican	John N. Langfitt (Note: Despite placing in second in the Republican primary, John N. Langfitt would advance to the general election.)	1,635	33.39%
Republican	R. O. Garber	1,574	32.15%
Total votes		4,896	100.00%

Iowa Senate, District 16 General Election, 1924
Party	Candidate	Votes	%
Republican	John Langfitt	6,453	56.08%
Democratic	Fred O. Welch	5,054	43.92%
Total votes		11,507	100.00%
Republican hold			

=== District 17 ===
Iowa Senate, District 17 Republican Primary Election, 1924
Party	Candidate	Votes	%
Republican	Redfield C. Mills	5,186	56.00%
Republican	H. J. Mantz (incumbent)	4,075	44.00%
Total votes		9,261	100.00%

Iowa Senate, District 17 General Election, 1924
Party	Candidate	Votes	%
Republican	Redfield C. Mills	11,646	65.09%
Democratic	J. W. Morris	6,246	34.91%
Total votes		17,892	100.00%
Republican hold			

=== District 19 ===
Iowa Senate, District 19 Republican Primary Election, 1924
Party	Candidate	Votes	%
Republican	W. S. Baird (incumbent)	3,162	44.93%
Republican	W. C. Children	2,558	36.35%
Republican	Lewis J. Neff	1,318	18.73%
Total votes		7,038	100.00%

Iowa Senate, District 19 Democratic Primary Election, 1924
Party	Candidate	Votes	%
Democratic	Charles T. Hanley	772	52.77%
Democratic	J. M. Shea	691	47.23%
Total votes		1,463	100.00%

Iowa Senate, District 19 General Election, 1924
Party	Candidate	Votes	%
Republican	W. S. Baird (incumbent)	13,683	61.21%
Democratic	Charles Hanley	8,670	38.79%
Total votes		22,353	100.00%
Republican hold			

=== District 23 ===
Iowa Senate, District 23 Republican Primary Election, 1924
Party	Candidate	Votes	%
Republican	Charles S. Browne (incumbent)	1,439	63.31%
Republican	W. F. Schirmer	834	36.69%
Total votes		2,273	100.00%

Iowa Senate, District 23 General Election, 1924
Party	Candidate	Votes	%
Republican	Charles S. Browne (incumbent)	3,914	54.31%
Democratic	John W. Sagers	3,293	45.69%
Total votes		7,207	100.00%
Republican hold			

=== District 24 ===
Iowa Senate, District 24 Republican Primary Election, 1924
Party	Candidate	Votes	%
Republican	C. L. Rigby	3,493	61.44%
Republican	William T. Gilmore	2,192	38.56%
Total votes		5,685	100.00%

Iowa Senate, District 24 General Election, 1924
Party	Candidate	Votes	%
Republican	C. L. Rigby	9,825	69.84%
Democratic	Michael Gorman	4,243	30.16%
Total votes		14,068	100.00%
Republican hold			

=== District 25 ===
Iowa Senate, District 25 Democratic Primary Election, 1924
Party	Candidate	Votes	%
Democratic	S. W. Mercer	1,847	59.05%
Democratic	Charles Colony	1,281	40.95%
Total votes		3,128	100.00%

Iowa Senate, District 25 General Election, 1924
Party	Candidate	Votes	%
Republican	George Clearman	9,059	51.91%
Democratic	S. W. Mercer	8,392	48.09%
Total votes		17,451	100.00%
Republican hold			

=== District 26 ===
Iowa Senate, District 26 General Election, 1924
Party	Candidate	Votes	%
Republican	W. G. Haskell (incumbent)	20,982	68.10%
Democratic	Luther A. Fuhrmeister	9,827	31.90%
Total votes		30,809	100.00%
Republican hold			

=== District 27 ===
Iowa Senate, District 27 Republican Primary Election, 1924
Party	Candidate	Votes	%
Republican	E. E. Cavanaugh	5,050	67.01%
Republican	John W. Kime	2,486	32.99%
Total votes		7,536	100.00%

Iowa Senate, District 27 General Election, 1924
Party	Candidate	Votes	%
Republican	E. E. Cavanaugh	11,861	79.25%
Democratic	L. C. Snearley	3,105	20.75%
Total votes		14,966	100.00%
Republican hold			

=== District 28 ===
Iowa Senate, District 28 Republican Primary Election, 1924
Party	Candidate	Votes	%
Republican	W. E. McLeland	3,167	51.88%
Republican	F. B. Gilbert	2,938	48.12%
Total votes		6,105	100.00%

Iowa Senate, District 28 General Election, 1924
Party	Candidate	Votes	%
Republican	W. E. McLeland	6,819	65.26%
Democratic	S. J. Burroughs	3,630	34.74%
Total votes		10,449	100.00%
Republican hold			

=== District 31 ===
Iowa Senate, District 31 Republican Primary Election, 1924
Party	Candidate	Votes	%
Republican	Lars J. Skromme	3,738	38.11%
Republican	H. N. Donhowe	2,449	24.97%
Republican	C. M. Peabody	2,232	22.75%
Republican	Ben Edwards	1,390	14.17%
Total votes		9,809	100.00%

Iowa Senate, District 31 General Election, 1924
Party	Candidate	Votes	%
Republican	Lars J. Skromme	12,857	82.02%
Democratic	H. F. McLaughlin	2,819	17.98%
Total votes		15,676	100.00%
Republican hold			

=== District 32 ===
Iowa Senate, District 32 General Election, 1924
Party	Candidate	Votes	%
Republican	Bertel M. Stoddard (incumbent)	21,071	100.00%
Total votes		21,071	100.00%
Republican hold			

=== District 33 ===
Iowa Senate, District 33 Republican Primary Election, 1924
Party	Candidate	Votes	%
Republican	W. J. Campbell	3,423	60.09%
Republican	George F. Slemmons (Note: Despite placing in second in the Republican primary, George Slemmons would advance to the general election.)	2,273	39.91%
Total votes		5,696	100.00%

Iowa Senate, District 33 General Election, 1924
Party	Candidate	Votes	%
Republican	George F. Slemmons	9,966	66.57%
Democratic	E. B. Porter	5,004	33.43%
Total votes		14,970	100.00%
Republican hold			

=== District 36 ===
Iowa Senate, District 36 Republican Primary Election, 1924
Party	Candidate	Votes	%
Republican	C. A. Benson	809	37.25%
Republican	William Becker	745	34.30%
Republican	J. C. Flenniken	618	28.45%
Total votes		2,172	100.00%

Iowa Senate, District 36 Democratic Primary Election, 1924
Party	Candidate	Votes	%
Democratic	J. F. Carroll	753	63.81%
Democratic	J. P. Dunsmore	427	36.19%
Total votes		1,180	100.00%

Iowa Senate, District 36 General Election, 1924
Party	Candidate	Votes	%
Republican	C. A. Benson	5,286	61.33%
Democratic	J. F. Carroll	3,333	38.67%
Total votes		8,619	100.00%
Republican hold			

=== District 39 ===
Iowa Senate, District 39 Republican Primary Election, 1924
Party	Candidate	Votes	%
Republican	John M. Ramsey	2,232	38.74%
Republican	B. B. Shores	2,183	37.89%
Republican	O. L. Mead (incumbent)	1,347	23.38%
Total votes		5,762	100.00%

Iowa Senate, District 39 General Election, 1924
Party	Candidate	Votes	%
Republican	John M. Ramsey	5,790	50.96%
Democratic	Dan Jerolaman	5,572	49.04%
Total votes		11,362	100.00%
Republican hold			

=== District 40 ===
Iowa Senate, District 40 General Election, 1924
Party	Candidate	Votes	%
Republican	George S. Hartman (incumbent)	11,091	68.88%
Democratic	S. H. Bevens	5,011	31.12%
Total votes		16,102	100.00%
Republican hold			

=== District 41 ===
Iowa Senate, District 41 Republican Primary Election, 1924
Party	Candidate	Votes	%
Republican	O. E. Gunderson	2,884	31.18%
Republican	Brede Wamstad	2,596	28.07%
Republican	O. K. Storre	2,045	22.11%
Republican	Stanley R. Smith	1,724	18.64%
Total votes		9,249	100.00%

Iowa Senate, District 41 General Election, 1924
Party	Candidate	Votes	%
Republican	O. E. Gunderson	8,172	62.69%
Democratic	E. E. Branstad	4,863	37.31%
Total votes		13,035	100.00%
Republican hold			

=== District 43 ===
Iowa Senate, District 43 Republican Primary Election, 1924
Party	Candidate	Votes	%
Republican	C. F. Johnston	7,350	61.01%
Republican	G. E. Van Wert	4,697	38.99%
Total votes		12,047	100.00%

Iowa Senate, District 43 General Election, 1924
Party	Candidate	Votes	%
Republican	C. F. Johnston	16,198	83.72%
Democratic	G. N. Clark	3,150	16.28%
Total votes		19,348	100.00%
Republican hold			

=== District 46 ===
Iowa Senate, District 46 Republican Primary Election, 1924
Party	Candidate	Votes	%
Republican	Ed H. Campbell (incumbent)	3,434	44.85%
Republican	George F. Coburn	3,076	40.17%
Republican	Dale Hunter	1,147	14.98%
Total votes		7,657	100.00%

Iowa Senate, District 46 General Election, 1924
Party	Candidate	Votes	%
Republican	Ed H. Campbell (incumbent)	12,226	100.00%
Total votes		12,226	100.00%
Republican hold			

=== District 47 ===
Iowa Senate, District 47 Republican Primary Election, 1924
Party	Candidate	Votes	%
Republican	W. J. Breakenridge	7,809	54.96%
Republican	A. H. Avery	6,399	45.04%
Total votes		14,208	100.00%

Iowa Senate, District 47 General Election, 1924
Party	Candidate	Votes	%
Republican	W. J. Breakenridge	17,360	77.22%
Democratic	William R. Gillette	5,121	22.78%
Total votes		22,481	100.00%
Republican hold			

=== District 49 ===
Iowa Senate, District 49 Republican Primary Election, 1924
Party	Candidate	Votes	%
Republican	H. E. Dean	5,667	55.27%
Republican	A. V. Brady	4,587	44.73%
Total votes		10,254	100.00%

Iowa Senate, District 49 General Election, 1924
Party	Candidate	Votes	%
Republican	H. E. Dean	15,586	100.00%
Total votes		15,586	100.00%
Republican hold			

== See also ==
- United States elections, 1924
- United States House of Representatives elections in Iowa, 1924
- Elections in Iowa
