= 1903 Iowa Senate election =

- November 3, 1903

29 out of 50 seats in the Iowa State Senate 26 seats needed for a majority
	Majority party	Minority party
Party	Republican	Democratic
Last election	39	11
Seats before	40 (Note: Democrat J. M. Emmert was originally declared the winner of the 1901 general election in the eighteenth senatorial district. Emmert received certificate of election and served until March 1902. However, Republican James E. Bruce contested the election of Mr. Emmert and the Senate, on March 14, 1902, decided the contest in favor of Mr. Bruce. The senators thereby removed Mr. Emmert and replaced him with Mr. Bruce, flipping the seat from Democratic to Republican control.)	10
Seats after	42	8
Seat change	▲2	▼2

The 1903 Iowa State Senate elections were the last state legislative general elections held on an odd-numbered year. Iowa voters elected state senators in 29 of the state senate's 50 districts. State senators traditionally serve four-year terms in the Iowa State Senate. However, under the Biennial Elections law enacted in 1904 by the Iowa General Assembly, the senators elected in 1903 served an additional fifth year (until the 1908 elections) to accommodate the transition to holding elections on even-numbered years. (Note: The twenty-ninth Iowa General Assembly enacted the Joint Resolution No. 5: Biennial Elections law in 1904 moving general elections to even-numbered years. Prior to this amendment to the Iowa constitution, elections to the state senate were held in odd-numbered years. The law stipulates: "Add as section 16, to article 12 of the constitution (of the state of Iowa), the following: The first general election after the adoption of this amendment shall be held on the Tuesday after the first Monday in November in the year one thousand nine hundred and six, and general elections shall be held biennially thereafter...members of the general assembly whose successors would otherwise be chosen at the general election in the year one thousand nine hundred and five, are hereby extended one year and until their successors are elected and qualified. The terms of office of senators whose successors would otherwise be chosen in the year one thousand nine hundred and seven are hereby extended one year and until their successors are elected and qualified...")

A statewide map of the 50 state Senate districts in the 1903 elections is provided by the Iowa General Assembly here.

The 1903 elections occurred before primary elections were established in Iowa by the Primary Election Law in 1907. The general election took place on November 3, 1903.

Following the previous election, Republicans had control of the Iowa Senate with 39 seats to Democrats' 11 seats. However, during the twenty-ninth session of the Iowa General Assembly, the senators decided in March 1902 to decertify Democrat Joseph Martin Emmert of district eighteen and replace Emmert with Republican James E. Bruce, thus flipping the seat from Democratic to Republican control. Therefore, going into Election Day in 1903, Republicans held an advantage of 40 seats to Democrats' 10 seats.

To claim control of the chamber from Republicans, the Democrats needed to net 16 Senate seats.

Republicans maintained control of the Iowa State Senate following the 1903 general election with the balance of power shifting to Republicans holding 42 seats and Democrats having 8 seats (a net gain of 2 seats for Republicans).

== Summary of Results ==
- Note: The 21 holdover Senators not up for re-election are not listed on this table.

Senate District	Incumbent	Party	Elected Senator	Party
2nd	Henry H. Brighton	Rep	James Elerick	Rep
3rd	Claude R. Porter	Dem	Lewis Leroy Taylor	Dem
4th	Alexander Mardis	Rep	Richard Albert Hasselquist	Rep
5th	George S. Allyn	Rep	Marion Floyd Stookey	Rep
6th	Franklin L. Arthaud	Rep	Daniel Webster Turner	Rep
8th	Joseph McKenna Junkin	Rep	Shirley Gillilland	Rep
11th	William Bell Tallman	Dem	James Harvey Jamison	Rep
14th	Lucian C. Blanchard	Rep	William G. Jones	Rep
15th	Frederick Townsend	Dem	James L. Warren	Rep
16th	James Judson Crossley	Rep	James Judson Crossley	Rep
17th	Francis M. "Frank" Hopkins	Rep	Francis M. "Frank" Hopkins	Rep
19th	Arthur Sargent Hazelton	Rep	Charles George Saunders	Rep
23rd	Thomas Lambert	Dem	Thomas Lambert	Dem
24th	John T. Moffit	Rep	Robert C. Stirton	Dem
25th	George W. Ball	Dem	John Hughes	Rep
26th	Jeremiah Smyth Alexander	Rep	Willard Coldren Stuckslager	Rep
27th	Thomas D. Healy	Rep	Henry Young	Rep
28th	John B. Classen	Rep	Charles Eckles	Rep
31st	Joseph Andrew Fitchpatrick	Rep	Charles John Alfred Ericson	Rep
32nd	Elbert Hamilton Hubbard	Rep	John H. Jackson	Rep
33rd	Henry Joseph Griswold	Rep	George W. Dunham	Rep
36th	Hiram Crusan Bishop	Dem	Byron W. Newberry	Rep
39th	George M. Craig	Rep	John F. Wade	Dem
40th	James Henry Trewin	Rep	Archibald C. Wilson	Rep
41st	James Albert Smith	Rep	James Albert Smith	Rep
43rd	William F. Harriman	Rep	Abner H. Gale	Rep
46th	Alva C. Hobart	Rep	John L. Bleakly	Rep
47th	Edsil Walter Bachman	Rep	George Kinne	Rep
49th	George William Lister	Rep	William C. Kimmel	Rep

== Detailed Results ==
- NOTE: The 21 districts that did not hold elections in 1903 are not listed here.

=== District 2 ===
Iowa Senate, District 2 General Election, 1903
Party	Candidate	Votes	%
Republican	James Elerick	3,951	54.59%
Democratic	John Peter Manatrey, Jr.	3,001	41.46%
Prohibition	W. B. Murray	286	3.95%
Total votes		7,238	100.00%
Republican hold			

=== District 3 ===
Iowa Senate, District 3 General Election, 1903
Party	Candidate	Votes	%
Democratic	Lewis Leroy Taylor	4,528	53.41%
Republican	James H. Swanson	3,770	44.47%
Socialist	H. G. Street	180	2.12%
Total votes		8,478	100.00%
Democratic hold			

=== District 4 ===
Iowa Senate, District 4 General Election, 1903
Party	Candidate	Votes	%
Republican	Richard Albert Hasselquist	3,623	51.47%
Democratic	Alexander L. Rockhold	3,416	48.53%
Total votes		7,039	100.00%
Republican hold			

=== District 5 ===
Iowa Senate, District 5 General Election, 1903
Party	Candidate	Votes	%
Republican	Marion Floyd Stookey	5,810	56.56%
Democratic	S. A. Bowers	4,462	43.44%
Total votes		10,272	100.00%
Republican hold			

=== District 6 ===
Iowa Senate, District 6 General Election, 1903
Party	Candidate	Votes	%
Republican	Daniel W. Turner	4,038	100.00%
Total votes		4,038	100.00%
Republican hold			

=== District 8 ===
Iowa Senate, District 8 General Election, 1903
Party	Candidate	Votes	%
Republican	Shirley Gillilland	3,911	90.39%
Prohibition	S. J. Waldron	416	9.61%
Total votes		4,327	100.00%
Republican hold			

=== District 11 ===
Iowa Senate, District 11 General Election, 1903
Party	Candidate	Votes	%
Republican	James Harvey Jamison	4,061	100.00%
Total votes		4,061	100.00%
Republican gain from Democratic			

=== District 14 ===
Iowa Senate, District 14 General Election, 1903
Party	Candidate	Votes	%
Republican	William G. Jones	3,526	52.72%
Democratic	Daniel Davis	2,858	42.73%
Prohibition	George Bowles	304	4.55%
Total votes		6,688	100.00%
Republican hold			

=== District 15 ===
Iowa Senate, District 15 General Election, 1903
Party	Candidate	Votes	%
Republican	James L. Warren	5,031	55.46%
Democratic	Thomas J. Price	4,003	44.13%
Prohibition	F. Marion Barnes	37	0.41%
Total votes		9,071	100.00%
Republican gain from Democratic			

=== District 16 ===
Iowa Senate, District 16 General Election, 1903
Party	Candidate	Votes	%
Republican	James Judson Crossley (incumbent)	4,373	100.00%
Total votes		4,373	100.00%
Republican hold			

=== District 17 ===
Iowa Senate, District 17 General Election, 1903
Party	Candidate	Votes	%
Republican	Francis M. "Frank" Hopkins (incumbent)	6,709	100.00%
Total votes		6,709	100.00%
Republican hold			

=== District 19 ===
Iowa Senate, District 19 General Election, 1903
Party	Candidate	Votes	%
Republican	Charles George Saunders	5,122	56.21%
Democratic	William H. Ware	3,868	42.44%
Prohibition	K. D. Clark	123	1.40%
Total votes		9,113	100.00%
Republican hold			

=== District 23 ===
Iowa Senate, District 23 General Election, 1903
Party	Candidate	Votes	%
Democratic	Thomas Lambert (incumbent)	2,683	52.39%
Republican	A. B. Bowen	2,438	47.61%
Total votes		5,121	100.00%
Democratic hold			

=== District 24 ===
Iowa Senate, District 24 General Election, 1903
Party	Candidate	Votes	%
Democratic	Robert C. Stirton	4,505	52.76%
Republican	Thomas B. Hanley	4,034	47.24%
Total votes		8,539	100.00%
Democratic gain from Republican			

=== District 25 ===
Iowa Senate, District 25 General Election, 1903
Party	Candidate	Votes	%
Republican	John Hughes, Jr.	4,981	51.66%
Democratic	Thomas Stapleton	4,661	48.34%
Total votes		9,642	100.00%
Republican gain from Democratic			

=== District 26 ===
Iowa Senate, District 26 General Election, 1903
Party	Candidate	Votes	%
Republican	Willard Coldren Stuckslager	5,271	57.11%
Democratic	John M. Hughes	3,540	38.35%
Prohibition	B. D. Alden	419	4.54%
Total votes		9,230	100.00%
Republican hold			

=== District 27 ===
Iowa Senate, District 27 General Election, 1903
Party	Candidate	Votes	%
Republican	Henry Young	4,362	51.32%
Democratic	J. B. Butler	3,859	45.41%
Prohibition	Charles H. Payne	278	3.27%
Total votes		8,499	100.00%
Republican hold			

=== District 28 ===
Iowa Senate, District 28 General Election, 1903
Party	Candidate	Votes	%
Republican	Charles Eckles	2,957	67.40%
Democratic	William Shipton	1,430	32.60%
Total votes		4,387	100.00%
Republican hold			

=== District 31 ===
Iowa Senate, District 31 General Election, 1903
Party	Candidate	Votes	%
Republican	Charles John Alfred Ericson	5,310	69.21%
Democratic	Edward C. Jordan	2,111	27.52%
Socialist	George F. Brechtel	251	3.27%
Total votes		7,672	100.00%
Republican hold			

=== District 32 ===
Iowa Senate, District 32 General Election, 1903
Party	Candidate	Votes	%
Republican	John H. Jackson	4,097	48.61%
Democratic	Arthur Samuel Garretson	4,063	48.21%
Prohibition	Bennett Mitchell	268	3.18%
Total votes		8,428	100.00%
Republican hold			

=== District 33 ===
Iowa Senate, District 33 General Election, 1903
Party	Candidate	Votes	%
Republican	George W. Dunham	4,506	56.31%
Democratic	G. B. Thompson	3,253	40.65%
Prohibition	D. C. McFarland	243	3.04%
Total votes		8,002	100.00%
Republican hold			

=== District 36 ===
Iowa Senate, District 36 General Election, 1903
Party	Candidate	Votes	%
Republican	Byron W. Newberry	3,133	54.63%
Democratic	Hiram Crusan Bishop (incumbent)	2,602	45.37%
Total votes		5,735	100.00%
Republican gain from Democratic			

=== District 39 ===
Iowa Senate, District 39 General Election, 1903
Party	Candidate	Votes	%
Democratic	John F. Wade	3,958	60.12%
Republican	E. W. Soesbe	2,626	39.88%
Total votes		6,584	100.00%
Democratic gain from Republican			

=== District 40 ===
Iowa Senate, District 40 General Election, 1903
Party	Candidate	Votes	%
Republican	Archibald C. Wilson	4,974	50.52%
Democratic	C. R. Brown	4,700	47.74%
Prohibition	S. B. Finney	171	1.74%
Total votes		9,845	100.00%
Republican hold			

=== District 41 ===
Iowa Senate, District 41 General Election, 1903
Party	Candidate	Votes	%
Republican	James Albert Smith (incumbent)	5,041	100.00%
Total votes		5,041	100.00%
Republican hold			

=== District 43 ===
Iowa Senate, District 43 General Election, 1903
Party	Candidate	Votes	%
Republican	Abner H. Gale	5,338	100.00%
Total votes		5,338	100.00%
Republican hold			

=== District 46 ===
Iowa Senate, District 46 General Election, 1903
Party	Candidate	Votes	%
Republican	John L. Bleakly	5,084	53.93%
Democratic	James Dalton	4,343	46.07%
Total votes		9,427	100.00%
Republican hold			

=== District 47 ===
Iowa Senate, District 47 General Election, 1903
Party	Candidate	Votes	%
Republican	George Kinne	7,793	67.52%
Democratic	Lewis Stuehmer	3,748	32.48%
Total votes		11,541	100.00%
Republican hold			

=== District 49 ===
Iowa Senate, District 49 General Election, 1903
Party	Candidate	Votes	%
Republican	William C. Kimmel	5,880	61.05%
Democratic	Luther H. Bishop	3,634	37.73%
Socialist	J. E. Quinlan	117	1.21%
Total votes		9,631	100.00%
Republican hold			

== See also ==
- Elections in Iowa
