= Scott Webster =

Scott Webster may refer to:

- Scott Webster (field hockey)
- Scott Webster (politician)
