= Albert Hambleton =

American politician (1857–1922)

Albert F. N. Hambleton (4 September 1857 – 11 September 1922) was an American politician.

Hambleton was born in Forest Home, Iowa, on 4 September 1857, to parents Levi and Mary Hall Hambleton. Following his education at common schools, the Mahaska County native attended preparatory school at Iowa College for one year, then graduated from Oskaloosa High School. Between 1873 and 1874, Hambleton enrolled at Penn College. He left Penn to work at his father's store, and later left Oskaloosa for employment in Springville. Upon his return to Oskaloosa in 1885, Hambleton became a realtor.

Hambleton was affiliated with the Republican Party. Between 1900 and 1902, he served on the Mahaska County board of supervisors. He was elected to his first term as a member of the Iowa House of Representatives the next year, and held the District 25 seat through 1909. In 1908, Hambleton defeated incumbent state senator William G. Jones in a party primary, and was nominated by the Republican Party as its candidate for District 14 of the Iowa Senate. Hambleton unsuccessfully challenged his loss in the election, and John Fletcher Ream took office. In 1910, Hambleton moved to California, where he continued working in real estate and insurance. He was also a trustee of Whittier College. Hambleton died in South Pasadena, California, on 11 September 1922.
