= Frank Goodykoontz =

American lawyer (1842–1898)

Member of the Iowa Senate from the 47th district
- In office January 12, 1880 – January 8, 1882

Personal details
- Born: Frank M. Goodykoontz; April 16, 1842 Anderson, Indiana, U.S.
- Died: November 24, 1898 (aged 56) Mitchell, South Dakota, U.S.
- Party: Republican
- Occupation: Politician, lawyer

Frank M. Goodykoontz (April 16, 1842 – November 24, 1898) was an American politician.

Goodykoontz was born in Anderson, Indiana, on April 16, 1842. He and his parents moved to Waukon, Iowa, in 1856. He began practicing law aged 21, successively in Le Roy, Minnesota, Postville, Lime Springs, and Mason City, Iowa. Goodykoontz was elected to the Iowa Senate from Cerro Gordo County and assumed office as a Republican in January 1880, representing District 47 until his resignation in took effect in January 1882. Goodykoontz left Iowa for Chamberlain, South Dakota, where he continued the practice of law, and later settled in Mitchell. He was considered a potential Populist candidate for the 1897 United States Senate elections in South Dakota, which saw the reelection of incumbent James H. Kyle. Goodykoontz died in Mitchell on November 24, 1898.
