= Nikhil Wagle (politician) =

American politician

Member-elect of the Iowa Senate from the 47th district
- Assuming office January 1, 2027
- Succeeding: Scott Webster

Personal details
- Party: Democratic
- Website: Campaign website

Nikhil Wagle is an American politician. A member of the Democratic Party, he is the member-elect of the Iowa State Senate for the 47th district, having won election in 2026. He will succeed Republican Scott Webster in the 2026 election. Wagle was appointed to the Iowa Board of Medicine by Governor Kim Reynolds on May 1, 2019. He is an ophthalmologist and former school board member. He is Indian American.
