= Shirley Gillilland =

American politician (1856–1927)

Shirley Gillilland (14 December 1856 – 6 December 1927) was an American politician.

Gillilland was born on 14 December 1856 in Mills County, Iowa. He earned a degree in liberal arts at the University of Iowa in 1879, and enrolled at the school's College of Law. Upon completing his legal education in 1884, Gillilland settled in Glenwood to practice law. Between 1891 and 1904, Gillilland was a member of the University of Iowa's Board of Regents. While serving on that body, Gillilland was thrice elected Mills County attorney, in 1892, 1894, and 1896, for six consecutive years in that position. He won the 1903 Iowa Senate election as a Republican candidate for District 8, and was reelected to the same seat in 1908. Gillilland stepped down at the end of his second Iowa Senate term in 1913. He won a fourth term as Mills County attorney in 1924, and retained the position in the 1926 election as well, though he died in office on 6 December 1927.
