= Scott Webster (politician) =

American politician

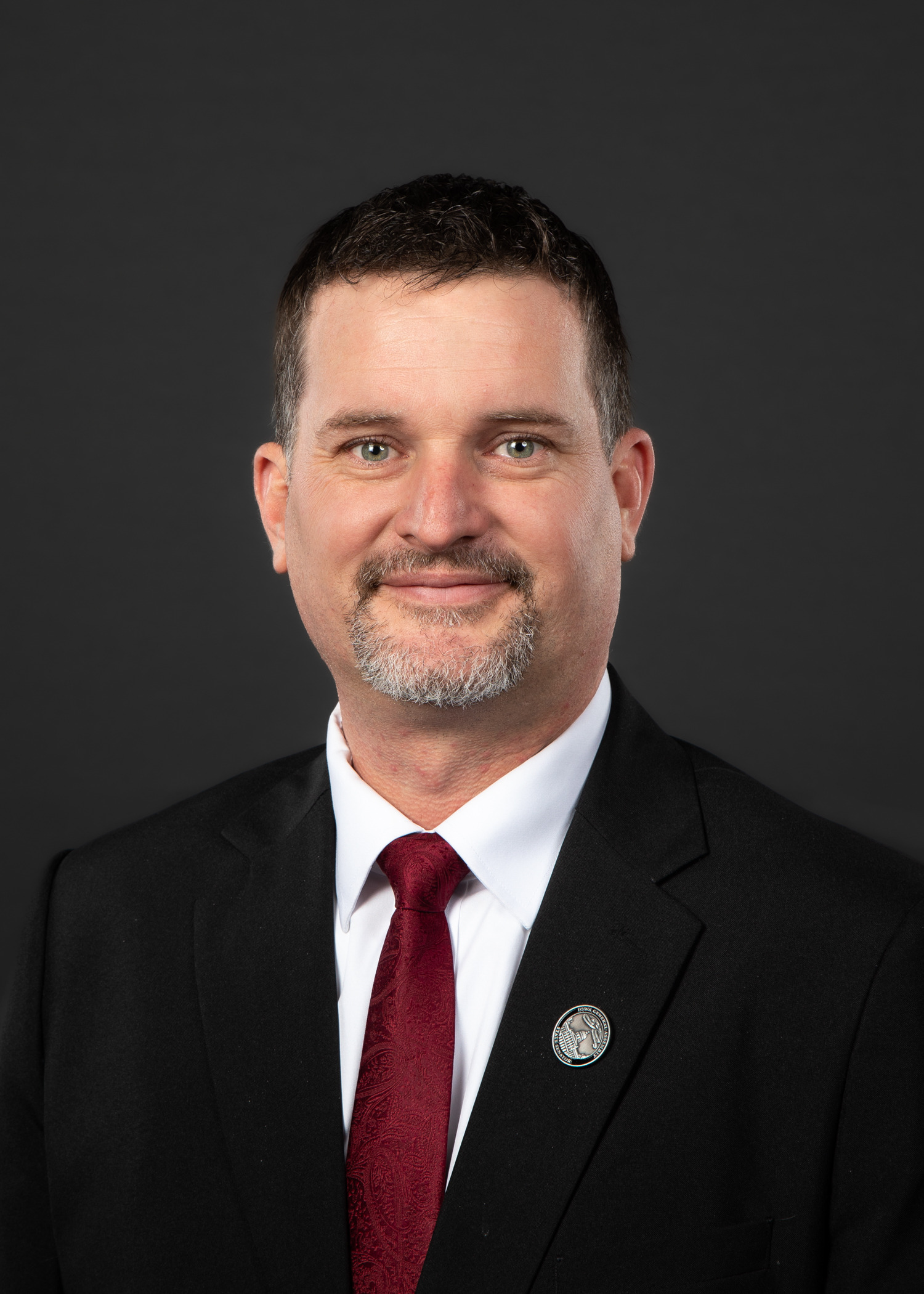
- Official portrait, c. 2023

Member of the Iowa Senate from the 47th district
- Incumbent
- Assumed office January 9, 2023
- Preceded by: Roby Smith
- Succeeded by: Nikhil Wagle (elect)

Personal details
- Party: Republican
- Occupation: Politician

Scott Webster is an American politician.

== Political career ==
Webster was elected representative of the fifth ward of Bettendorf, Iowa's city council in a 2014 special election. In 2018, he mounted an unsuccessful bid for a position on the Scott County board of supervisors. While serving on the city council, Webster was appointed to the Iowa League of Cities Legislative Policy Committee from January 2019. In February 2022, he began campaigning to represent District 47 in the Iowa Senate. Webster faced Barry Long in the Republican Party primary, and defeated Democratic candidate Mary Kathleen Figaro in the general election.

In the 2024 Republican Party presidential primaries, Webster initially endorsed Florida Governor Ron DeSantis before switching to businessman Vivek Ramaswamy.

In the 2026, he ran for re-election to represent District 47 in the Iowa Senate however was defeated by Democratic candidate Nikhil Wagle in the general election.

Iowa Senate
Preceded by Roby Smith	47th District; 2023 – 2027	Succeeded by Nikhil Wagle
