= John Taylor (20th-century Iowa politician) =

American politician

John H. Taylor was an American politician.

== Life ==
John H. Taylor was of German descent, born in Kingward, West Virginia, in Preston County, on July 15, 1870. He was educated at the West Virginia Normal School and the University of West Virginia, earning degrees in 1890 and 1891, respectively. Taylor settled in Iowa in March 1892. He was a schoolteacher for seven years, before switching vocations to become a Methodist preacher for fifteen years. His religious work took him to the counties of Mahaska, Jefferson, Louisa and Van Buren. Taylor later moved to Farmington and became a newspaper editor for eighteen years. He also worked in real estate and insurance. He was affiliated with the Odd Fellows and Freemasonry. Taylor and his wife Elsie M. Longakar raised four children.

== Political career ==
Taylor was elected to consecutive terms on the Iowa Senate in 1913 and 1915. At the time District 2 included Van Buren and Jefferson counties. While living in New Sharon, Taylor was a school board member, mayor, and postmaster. He held the last position for twelve years, from 1922 to 1934. He sat on the Iowa House of Representatives between 1935 and 1937 as a legislator from District 25, based in Mahaska County. Throughout his political career, Taylor was a member of the Republican Party.
