= Elmer Ellsworth Mitchell =

American politician

Elmer Ellsworth Mitchell (27 January 1863 – 17 March 1924) was an American politician.

Mitchell was born near New Sharon, Iowa, on 27 January 1863 and attended the public schools of Mahaska County until the age of seventeen, when he enrolled at Oskaloosa College. He attended the college for two years, then became a schoolteacher for the next six years. In 1890, Mitchell began working for the predecessor agency of the United States Census Bureau. In 1892, he transferred to the Government Printing Office. While employed by the federal government of the United States, Mitchell earned a master's degree in law from the University of Washington School of Law. He later took postgraduate courses at Columbia University Law School, and received his license to practice law. When Mitchell's father died, he returned to Mahaska County and ran the family farm, Mitchell Meadows. He served a single term in the Iowa Senate from 1917 to 1921, representing District 14 as a Republican. Mitchell died on 17 March 1924, on his farm near New Sharon.
