= Charles J. Fulton =

American politician (1860–1937)

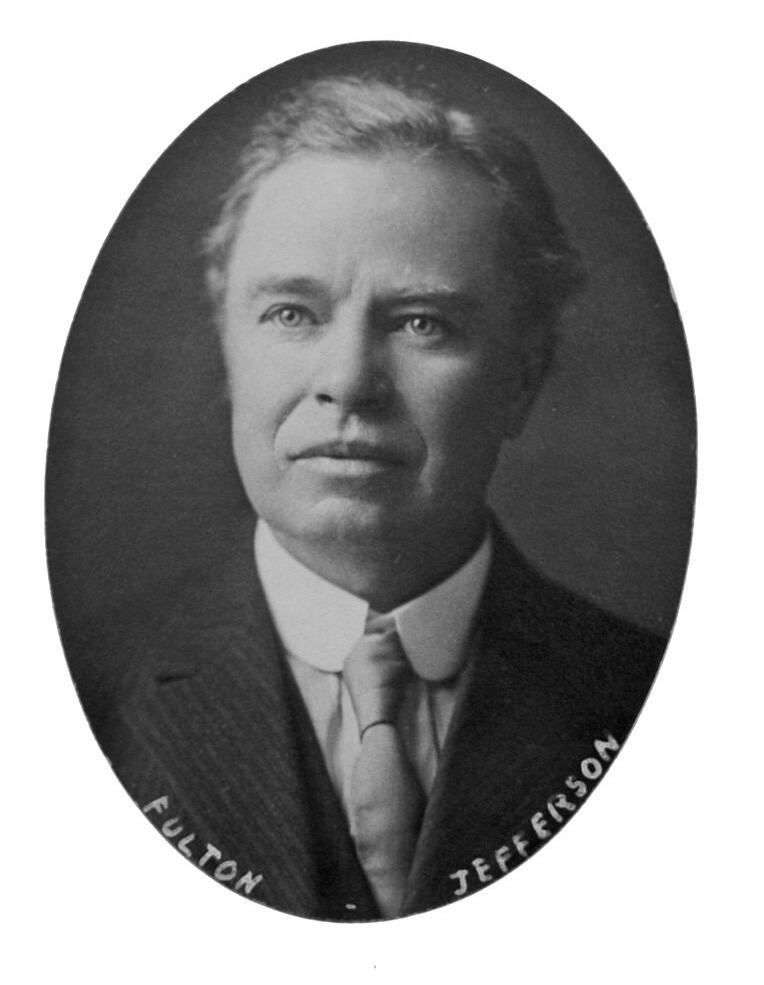
- 33rd General Assembly, circa 1909

Member of the Iowa House of Representatives from the 19th district
- In office January 11, 1909 – January 12, 1913
- Preceded by: James Frederic Clarke
- Succeeded by: Scott Alan Power

Member of the Iowa Senate from the 2nd district
- In office January 10, 1921 – January 13, 1929
- Preceded by: George Washington Ball
- Succeeded by: Aaron Vale Blackford

Personal details
- Born: January 27, 1860 Jefferson County, Iowa, U.S.
- Died: December 6, 1937 (aged 77) Fairfield, Iowa, U.S.
- Party: Republican
- Spouse(s): Herminie Stichter (1898–1926); Beatrice Leggett (1926–1937)
- Children: 3
- Occupation: Manufacturer

Charles J. Fulton (27 January 1860 – 6 December 1937) was an American politician from Iowa.

Fulton was born in Jefferson County on 27 January 1860, and attended Parsons College in Fairfield. After graduating in 1883, he traveled south, finding employment in sales throughout Texas and Oklahoma. Fulton returned to Fairfield in 1891, and worked for the Louden Machinery Company. He served on municipal and county school boards, as well as on the board of trustees of Parsons College before pursuing further public service as mayor of Fairfield. Fulton was a longtime member of the board for the Fairfield Public Library, serving as secretary between 1892 and 1930, then as president thereafter. Between 1909 and 1913, Fulton was a Republican member of the Iowa House of Representatives for District 19. He stepped down as a state representative after two full terms. Fulton subsequently won election to the Iowa Senate in 1920, and was reelected in 1924. During his tenure as a state senator, he represented District 2.

Fulton married Herminie Stichter in 1898, with whom he had three children. She died in 1926 and he remarried the same year to Beatrice Leggett. He died in Fairfield on 6 December 1937.
