= Edward McMurray Smith =

American politician

Ed Smith

16th Secretary of State of Iowa
- In office 1929–1931
- Governor: John Hammill
- Preceded by: Walter C. Ramsay
- Succeeded by: G. C. Greenwalt

Member of the Iowa Senate from the 16th district
- In office January 8, 1917 – January 11, 1925
- Preceded by: Arthur Craig Savage
- Succeeded by: John N. Langfitt

Personal details
- Born: Edward McMurray Smith; October 31, 1870 Jackson County, Iowa, U.S.
- Died: October 26, 1953 (aged 82) Winterset, Iowa, U.S.
- Party: Republican
- Education: Drake University

Edward McMurray Smith (October 31, 1870 – October 26, 1953) was an American politician and newspaper editor who served as the 16th secretary of state of Iowa from 1929 to 1931.

== Early life and education ==
Born in Jackson County, Iowa, Smith moved with his parents to Madison County, Iowa. He went to the Madison public schools. Smith then attended Dexter Normal School and Drake University.

== Career ==
From 1898 to 1900, Smith served as superintendent of Madison County Schools. In 1899, Smith became publisher and editor of The Winterset Madisonian in Winterset, Iowa. Smith served as postmaster for Winterset from 1904 to 1908. From 1917 to 1925, Smith served in the Iowa State Senate and was a Republican. In 1928, Smith was appointed Iowa secretary of state when the incumbent Walter C. Ramsay died in office. He served until 1931. In 1930, he unsuccessfully sought the Republican nomination for governor of Iowa.

== Death ==
Smith died in a hospital in Winterset, Iowa after a brief illness.

== Notes ==
Political offices
| Preceded by Walter C. Ramsay | Secretary of State of Iowa; 1929–1931 | Succeeded by G. C. Greenwalt |
