= George Washington Ball (Iowa Republican) =

American businessman and politician (1848–1920)

George W. Ball
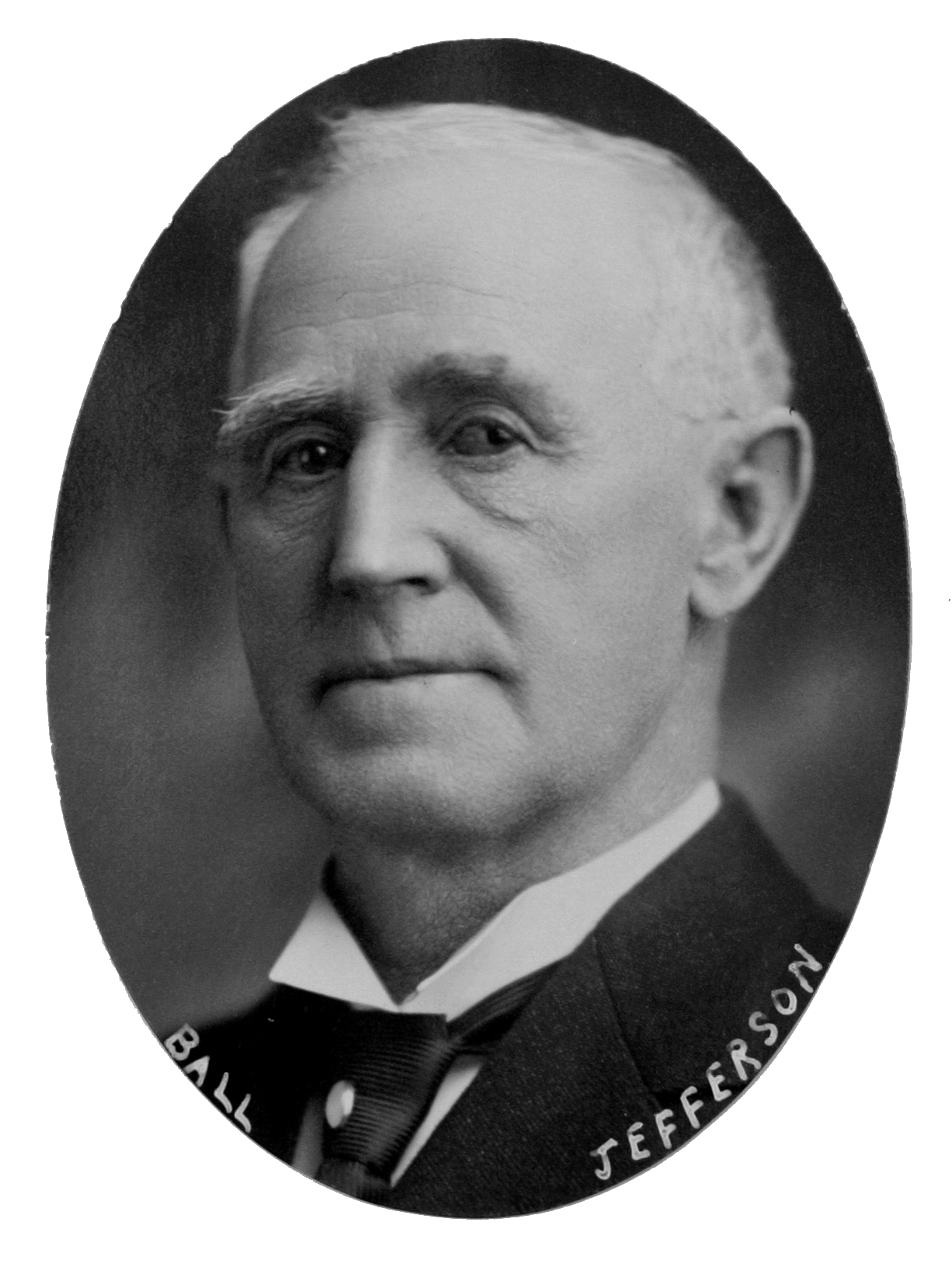

Member of the Iowa Senate from the 2nd district
- In office 1917–1920

Member of the Iowa House of Representatives from the 19th district
- In office 1888–1892
- In office 1915–1917

Personal details
- Born: March 6, 1848 Hancock County, Virginia, U.S.
- Died: March 14, 1920 (aged 72) Fairfield, Iowa, U.S.
- Party: Republican
- Occupation: Politician; banker; farmer

George Washington Ball (March 6, 1848 – March 14, 1920) was an American businessman and politician from Iowa who represented Jefferson County as a Republican in the state legislature as representative and senator.

George W. Ball was born in Hancock County, Virginia (now West Virginia), the son of Joseph and Margaret (Longfitt) Ball. He was descended from the family of which belonged Mary Ball, the mother of George Washington. He came with his parents to Jefferson County, Iowa, in 1854 where he attended the public schools and Fairfield University. He engaged in farming, banking and manufacturing, was a director in the Iowa State Savings Bank, the Iowa Loan and Trust Company and the Fairfield Gasoline Engine Company, all of Fairfield. In 1887 he was elected representative and re-elected two years later. Again elected in 1914, he served as representative in the Twenty-second, Twenty-third and Thirty-sixth General Assemblies. In 1916 he was elected senator from the Jefferson-Van Buren district, and served in the Thirty-seventh and Thirty-eighth General Assemblies. He vigorously proposed repealing the law for extending and improving the capitol grounds.

Ball was married to Maggie Laughlin on October 31, 1872, and with her had five children. He died at Fairfield, aged 72.
