= Albert Fellows =

American politician (1864–1932)

Albert M. Fellows

Member of the Iowa Senate, District 40
- In office January 13, 1913 – January 9, 1921

Personal details
- Born: March 1, 1864 Center Township, Allamakee County, Iowa, United States
- Died: February 17, 1932 (aged 67)
- Party: Republican
- Occupation: Politician

Albert M. Fellows (March 1, 1864 – February 17, 1932) was an American politician.

Albert Fellows was one of eleven children of parents Liberty Fellows and Mary S. Reed. Fellows was born in Center Township, Allamakee County, Iowa, on March 1, 1864. The family moved into the city of Lansing, where young Albert completed primary and high school. Fellows later attended Upper Iowa University, then worked for sawmill operator John Robson.

Fellows was affiliated with the Republican Party throughout his political career, which included over fifteen years on the Lansing school board, eight years as city councilor, and 1903 to 1908 as mayor of Lansing prior to his election to the Iowa General Assembly. Fellows served two terms on the Iowa Senate for District 40, from January 13, 1913, to January 9, 1921, then returned to the mayoralty until declining to run for the office in 1931. He died on February 17, 1932, while seeking treatment for coronary thrombosis at a hospital in La Crosse, Wisconsin.
