= William G. Jones (politician) =

American politician in Iowa (1861–1956)

William G. Jones (22 October 1861 – 3 May 1956) was an American politician from Iowa.

William G. Jones was born on 22 October 1861 on the family farm in Garfield Township, Mahaska County, Iowa. His parents John G. and Margaret Jones were Welsh immigrants. After attending from Oskaloosa College, and graduating from Penn College in 1882, Jones was a student at the University of Iowa College of Law until 1884. He practiced law in Oskaloosa and served as the city's attorney for two years before his election as a Republican member of the Iowa House of Representatives in 1899. Jones held the District 25 seat between 1900 and 1904, when he began his tenure on the Iowa Senate, representing District 14 until 1909. Jones died on 3 May 1956.
