= John K. Hale (Iowa politician) =

American politician (1858–1946)

John K. Hale (27 August 1858 – 31 January 1946) was an American politician from Iowa.

Hale was born in Guilford, Connecticut, on 27 August 1858, and moved with his family near Anamosa, Iowa, in 1859. He married for the first time in 1879, to Carrie Black, with whom he had one daughter. After she died in 1881, Hale remarried the next year, to Clare E. Stone, and had another daughter. Hale farmed outside of Anamosa until 1892, when he moved into the town itself and became a grocer.

Hale was a Republican. He first served as a trustee of Jackson Township, before his election as a Jones County supervisor. After eight years as a county supervisor, he ran for the Iowa House of Representatives in 1914, and served a single two-year term for District 47. Hale was elected to the Iowa Senate in 1916 from District 24. Hale retained the seat for two terms, and stepped down in 1924. He died on 31 January 1946.
