= Leslie E. Francis =

American lawyer and politician (1871–1957)

Member of the Iowa Senate from the 47th district
- In office January 11, 1909 – January 7, 1917

Personal details
- Born: April 4, 1871 Dickinson County, Iowa, U.S.
- Died: February 11, 1957 (aged 85) Des Moines, Iowa, U.S.
- Party: Republican
- Education: University of Iowa
- Occupation: Politician, lawyer

Leslie E. Francis (April 4, 1871 – February 11, 1957) was an American lawyer and politician.

Leslie Francis's parents settled on a homestead near Spirit Lake, Iowa, in May 1860. His father completed four years of military service during the American Civil War, including time with the Army of the Frontier. Leslie Francis was born on April 4, 1871, and attended country schools until he was sixteen, spent the next winter a student of Spirit Lake High School, and thereafter began teaching country school. Francis read law with Spirit Lake lawyer William Hayward, and for two additional winters enrolled at an academy in his hometown. Aged 20, he enrolled in the University of Iowa College of Law. Upon graduating on June 16, 1893, Francis returned to Spirit Lake to practice law.

Francis participated in Republican Party political campaigns starting in 1894, and remained active on this front for three decades. He served as Dickinson county attorney from 1895 to 1901. Francis was then elected to two four-year terms on the Iowa Senate, representing District 47 from January 11, 1909, to January 7, 1917. After the June 1912 death of incumbent congressman Elbert H. Hubbard, Francis was considered for the Republican nomination in Iowa's 11th congressional district, which instead went to George Cromwell Scott, who had originally lost the primary to Hubbard.

Francis moved from Spirit Lake to Des Moines on September 8, 1917, and established a law firm with George Cosson the following year. Between 1934 and May 1935, Francis served as legal adviser to the Iowa Liquor Control Commission. He died in Des Moines on February 11, 1957.
