= John Fletcher Ream =

American politician

Member of the Iowa Senate
- In office 1908–1917
- Constituency: District 14 (Mahaska County)

Personal details
- Born: September 16, 1854 New Castle, Pennsylvania, U.S.
- Died: February 26, 1927 (aged 72) Oskaloosa, Iowa, U.S.
- Party: Democratic
- Occupation: Politician; coal miner; union leader
- Known for: President of Iowa District, United Mine Workers; first Democratic state senator from Mahaska county after the Civil War

John Fletcher Ream (16 September 1854 – 26 February 1927) was an American politician.

Ream was born on 16 September 1854 in New Castle, Pennsylvania. His mother was of English descent, and his father was of German descent. The Ream family moved to Mahaska County, Iowa in May 1855. At the age of sixteen, John Ream began working in the coal mines of Beacon, Iowa. Between 1898 and 1900, Ream was president of the Iowa District of the United Mine Workers union. He also served a three year-term on the national executive board of the union, representing the state of Iowa. Prior to seeking statewide political office, Ream served on the Beacon school board for nine years, was mayor of the town, as well as justice of the peace. He was elected to the Iowa Senate in 1908 and 1912 to represent District 14, which included Mahaska County at the time. He was the first Democratic Party candidate from Mahaska County to be elected a state senator since the American Civil War ended. Ream's electoral victory in 1908 was unsuccessfully challenged by Albert F. N. Hambleton. Ream stepped down at the end of his second term in 1917, and died at Mercy Hospital in Oskaloosa on 26 February 1927.
