= Nicholas Balkema =

American politician (1865–1954)

Member of the Iowa Senate from the 49th district
- In office January 11, 1909 – January 9, 1921

Personal details
- Born: April 7, 1865 Gibbsville, Wisconsin, U.S.
- Died: January 29, 1954 (aged 88) Sioux Center, Iowa, U.S.
- Party: Republican
- Spouse: Clara Van Rooyen (m. 1886)
- Children: 7
- Education: Sheboygan Falls High School
- Occupation: Politician

Nicholas Balkema (April 7, 1865 – January 29, 1954) was an American politician.

Balkema was of Dutch descent. He was born on April 7, 1865, in Gibbsville, Wisconsin, attended Sheboygan Falls High School, then moved to Newkirk, Iowa, in 1884. On December 9, 1886, he married a Newkirk native, Clara Van Rooyen, with whom he raised four daughters and three sons. He became a schoolteacher and later ran his own business as well as the post office. In 1894, Balkema moved to Sioux Center. He held local offices and executive positions for a time before pursuing statewide political office. These included service as a bank executive, school board member, and city councillor in Sioux Center. Between 1909 and 1921, Balkema represented District 49, which included Sioux County, in the Iowa Senate as a Republican. He died on January 29, 1954, aged 88.
