= Arthur Craig Savage =

American politician (1870–1931)

Arthur Craig Savage (January 2, 1870 – February 22, 1931) was an American politician.

Savage's parents moved to Iowa from New York. He was born in Prairieburg, Iowa, on January 2, 1870. In childhood, he moved successively from Stuart to Dexter, and attended schools in both towns. Savage subsequently enrolled at Grinnell College. In 1893, Savage moved to Adair. He was involved in the operations of banks in Stuart, Dexter, and Adair, and served as the school treasurer in Adair for twelve years.

Savage was twice elected to represent District 16 of the Iowa Senate as a Republican, serving from January 11, 1909, to January 7, 1917. He was a candidate in the 1911 United States Senate election in Iowa, which saw the Iowa General Assembly select incumbent Albert B. Cummins. Savage moved to Des Moines after accepting a February 1919 appointment to the Iowa Insurance Commission. Upon completing a four-year term as commissioner, Savage began working for the Royal Union Life Insurance Company. At the time of his death on February 22, 1931, Savage was vice president and assistant treasurer of the company.
