= Iowa's 25th Senate district =

American legislative district

Iowa's 25th State Senate district
Senator
Annette Sweeney; R

The 25th District of the Iowa Senate is located in central Iowa, and is currently composed of part of Story County.

== Current elected officials ==
As of January 2023, Herman Quirmbach is the senator representing the 25th District.

The area of the 25th District contains two Iowa House of Representatives districts:

- The 49th District (represented by Beth Vessel-Kroeschell)
- The 50th District (represented by Ross Wilburn)

The district is also located in Iowa's 4th congressional district, which is represented by Randy Feenstra.

== Past senators ==
The district has previously been represented by:

- Charles Balloun, 1967–1971
- Wally Horn, 1983–1992
- Richard Varn, 1993–1994
- Robert Dvorsky, 1994–2002
- Daryl Beall, 2003–2012
- Bill Dix, 2013–2018
- Annette Sweeney 2018–2023
- Herman Quirmbach 2023-present

== Recent election results from statewide races ==
Year	Office	Results
2008	President	Obama 62–36%
2012	President	Obama 62–38%
2016	President	Clinton 57–36%
2016	Senate	Judge 50–46%
2018	Governor	Hubbell 66–31%
2018	Attorney General	Miller 80–20%
2018	Secretary of State	DeJear 64–34%
2018	Treasurer	Fitzgerald 69–28%
2018	Auditor	Sand 61–36%
2020	President	Biden 66–31%
2020	Senate	Greenfield 64–33%
2022	Senate	Franken 67–33%
2022	Governor	DeJear 65–33%
2022	Attorney General	Miller 71–29%
2022	Secretary of State	Miller 62–38%
2022	Treasurer	Fitzgerald 71–29%
2022	Auditor	Sand 71–29%
2024	President	Harris 63–35%

== See also ==
- Iowa General Assembly
- Iowa Senate
