= Iowa's 47th Senate district =

American legislative district

Senate District 47
- Type: District of the Upper House
- Location: Scott County
- Senator: Scott Webster (R)
- Parent organization: Iowa General Assembly

The 47th District of the Iowa Senate is located in eastern Iowa, and is currently composed of part of Scott County.

== Current elected officials ==
Scott Webster is the senator currently representing the 47th District. He was preceded by Roby Smith, who currently is serving as Iowa's State Treasurer.

The area of the 47th District contains two Iowa House of Representatives districts:

- The 93rd District (represented by Gary Mohr)
- The 94th District (represented by Mike Vondran)

The district is also located in Iowa's 1st congressional district, which is represented by Mariannette Miller-Meeks.

== Past senators ==
The district has previously been represented by:

- Frank Goodykoontz, 1880–1882
- Leslie E. Francis, 1909–1917
- John L. Buren, 1965–1966
- J. Henry Lucken, 1967–1970
- Charles Laverty, 1971–1972
- Richard Ramsey, 1973–1982
- Calvin Hultman, 1983–1990
- Derryl McLaren, 1991–1992
- Donald Gettings, 1993–1998
- David Miller, 1999–2002
- Keith Kreiman, 2003–2010
- Mark Chelgren, 2011–2012
- Roby Smith, 2013–2023
- Scott Webster, 2023–2027
- Nikhil Wagle, 2027–present

== Recent election results from statewide races ==
| Year | Office | Results |
|---|---|---|
| 2008 | President | Obama 49.4–49.3% |
| 2012 | President | Romney 52–48% |
| 2016 | President | Trump 50–42% |
| 2016 | Senate | Grassley 61–35% |
| 2018 | Governor | Reynolds 52–46% |
| 2018 | Attorney General | Miller 70–30% |
| 2018 | Secretary of State | Pate 53–45% |
| 2018 | Treasurer | Fitzgerald 51–47% |
| 2018 | Auditor | Sand 50–48% |
| 2020 | President | Trump 50–48% |
| 2020 | Senate | Ernst 51–46% |
| 2022 | Senate | Grassley 55–45% |
| 2022 | Governor | Reynolds 58–40% |
| 2022 | Attorney General | Bird 53–47% |
| 2022 | Secretary of State | Pate 58–42% |
| 2022 | Treasurer | Smith 56–44% |
| 2022 | Auditor | Halbur 53–47% |
| 2024 | President | Trump 53–45% |
