= 2026 Iowa Senate election =

2026 Iowa Senate Election
- November 3, 2026

25 of the 50 seats in the Iowa Senate 26 seats needed for a majority
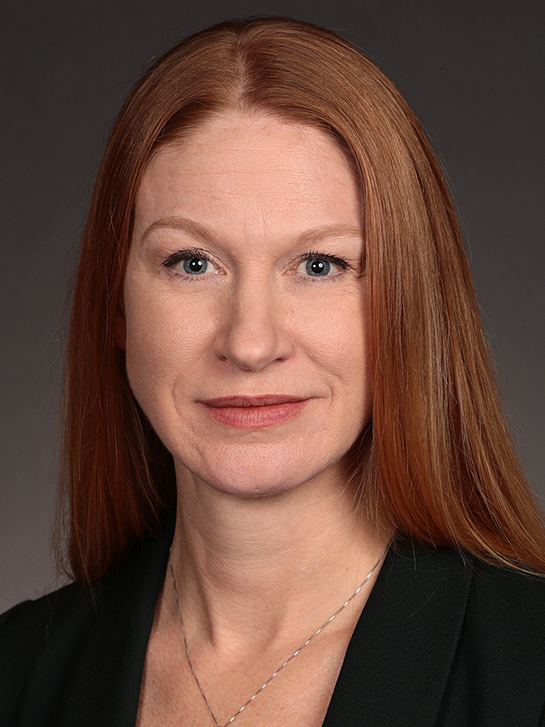

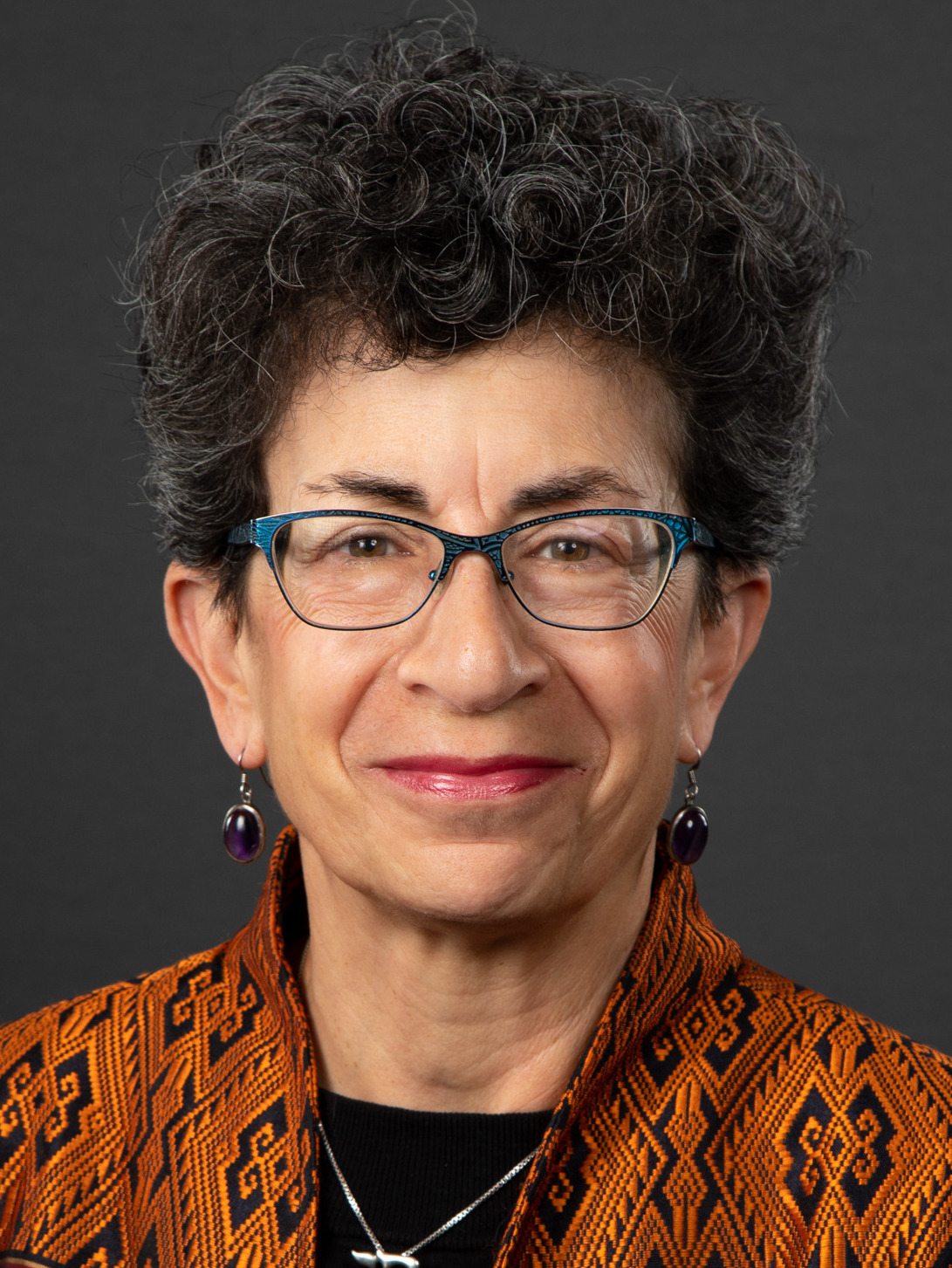
	Majority party	Minority party
Leader	Amy Sinclair	Janice Weiner
Party	Republican	Democratic
Leader since	January 9, 2023	January 8, 2025
Leader's seat	12th district	45th district
Last election	19 seats, 59.58%	6 seats, 36.98%
Seats before	33	17
Seats won	32	18
Seat change	1 ▼	1 ▲
Seats up	14	11
- Status of the incumbents: Republican incumbent running Republican incumbent retiring or switching seats Democratic incumbent running Democratic incumbent retiring No election
President of the Senate before election
Amy Sinclair
Republican
Elected President of the Senate
Amy Sinclair
Republican

The 2026 Iowa Senate election was held on November 3, 2026, to elect members of the Iowa Senate from 25 odd-numbered districts.

== Background ==
Republicans have controlled the Iowa Senate since the 2016 election. They expanded their supermajority in the chamber to 35 seats in the 2024 election, their largest majority since the 1970 election. They never seated this many Senators, however, as Chris Cournoyer resigned to become lieutenant governor. Democrat Mike Zimmer flipped her seat in the ensuing special election in a major upset, undoing Republicans' net gain from the 2024 election. Later in 2025, the death of Republican Rocky De Witt led to another special election, which Democrat Catelin Drey won in an upset, breaking the Republican supermajority in the chamber, which they had held since the 2022 elections. Entering the 2026 election, Republicans held a 33–17 majority in the Senate.

== Summary of results by district ==
Italics denote a retiring Senator; bold text denotes a gain for a party.

District	2024 Pres.	Incumbent	Party	Elected Senator	Outcome
1st	R+11.4	Catelin Drey	Dem	Catelin Drey	Dem
3rd	R+47.3	Lynn Evans	Rep	Lynn Evans	Rep
5th	R+41.1	Dave Rowley	Rep	Dave Rowley	Rep
7th	R+41.2	Kevin Alons	Rep	Kevin Alons	Rep
9th	R+42.1	Tom Shipley	Rep	Steve Baier	Rep
11th	R+21.9	Julian Garrett (Note: Garrett died on June 8, 2026.)	Rep	Hollie Zajicek	Rep
13th	R+40.5	Cherielynn Westrich	Rep	Jeff Kulmatycki	Rep
15th	D+16.8	Tony Bisignano	Dem	Tony Bisignano	Dem
17th	D+35.8	Izaah Knox	Dem	Samy El-Baroudi	Dem
19th	R+35.2	Ken Rozenboom	Rep	Barb Kniff McCulla	Rep
21st	R+2.2	Mike Bousselot	Rep	**Heather Matson**	**Dem**
23rd	R+16.4	Jack Whitver	Rep	Wes Enos	Rep
25th	D+27.3	Herman Quirmbach	Dem	Herman Quirmbach	Dem
27th	R+29.5	Annette Sweeney	Rep	Annette Sweeney	Rep
29th	R+30.4	Sandy Salmon	Rep	Sandy Salmon	Rep
31st	D+12.3	William Dotzler	Dem	Timi Brown-Powers	Dem
33rd	R+28.2	Carrie Koelker	Rep	Carrie Koelker	Rep
35th	R+21.1	Mike Zimmer	Dem	**Joe Stutting**	**Rep**
37th	D+11.3	Molly Donahue	Dem	Molly Donahue	Dem
39th	D+22.5	Liz Bennett	Dem	Liz Bennett	Dem
41st	R+11.3	Kerry Gruenhagen	Rep	Kerry Gruenhagen	Rep
43rd	D+38.3	Zach Wahls	Dem	Meghann Foster	Dem
45th	D+52.6	Janice Weiner	Dem	Janice Weiner	Dem
47th	R+8.0	Scott Webster	Rep	**Nikhil Wagle**	**Dem**
49th	D+8.7	Cindy Winckler	Dem	Cindy Winckler	Dem

== Retirements ==
=== Republicans ===
- District 23: Jack Whitver is retiring.

=== Democrats ===
- District 17: Izaah Knox is retiring to run for Polk County supervisor.
- District 43: Zach Wahls is retiring to run for the U.S. Senate.

== Predictions ==
Source	Ranking	As of
Sabato's Crystal Ball	Likely R	January 22, 2026
State Navigate	Safe R	August 27, 2026

== Detailed results ==
=== District 1 ===
The 1st district encompasses the city of Sioux City. The incumbent is Democrat Catelin Drey, who was elected in a special election on August 26, 2025, with 55.2% of the vote.

District 1 general election
Party	Candidate	Votes	%
Democratic	Catelin Drey (incumbent)		
Republican	Christopher Prosch		
Write-in			
Total votes			100.0

=== District 3 ===
The 3rd district encompasses all of Buena Vista, O'Brien, and Osceola counties, as well as parts of Cherokee and Clay counties. The incumbent is Republican Lynn Evans, who was elected in 2022 with 99.1% of the vote. Evans briefly ran for the U.S. House of Representatives in Iowa's 4th congressional district, but dropped out of the race in July 2025.

He announced that he would instead run for re-election.

District 3 Republican primary Unofficial results
Party	Candidate	Votes	%
Republican	Lynn Evans (incumbent)	4,279	71.58%
Republican	Shane Bellefy	1,689	28.25%
Write-in		10	0.17%
Total votes		5,978	100.00%

District 3 general election
Party	Candidate	Votes	%
Republican	Lynn Evans (incumbent)		
Democratic	Mike Frantz		
Write-in			
Total votes			100.0

=== District 5 ===
The 5th district encompasses all of Dickinson, Emmet, Kossuth, Palo Alto, and Winnebago counties, as well as part of Clay County. The incumbent is Republican Dave Rowley, who was re-elected in 2022 with 98.5% of the vote.

Rowley announced he would run for re-election in August 2025. He was diagnosed with tonsil cancer in early 2026, but has said this does not affect his plans to run for re-election.

District 5 Republican primary Unofficial results
Party	Candidate	Votes	%
Republican	Dave Rowley (incumbent)	3,638	52.56%
Republican	Stacy Besch	3,277	47.34%
Write-in		7	0.10%
Total votes		6,922	100.00%

District 5 general election
Party	Candidate	Votes	%
Republican	Dave Rowley (incumbent)		
Write-in			
Total votes			100.0

=== District 7 ===
The 7th district encompasses all of Monona County, most of Woodbury County, and parts of Cherokee and Plymouth counties. The incumbent is Republican Kevin Alons, who was elected in 2022 with 98.0% of the vote. He is running for re-election.

District 7 general election
Party	Candidate	Votes	%
Republican	Kevin Alons (incumbent)		
Write-in			
Total votes			100.0

=== District 9 ===
The 9th district encompasses all of Adams, Cass, Montgomery, Page, and Ringgold counties, as well as most of Union County. The incumbent is Republican Tom Shipley, who was re-elected in 2022 with 76.9% of the vote.

District 9 general election
Party	Candidate	Votes	%
Republican	Steve Baier		
Write-in			
Total votes			100.0

=== District 11 ===
The 11th district encompasses all of Warren County and part of Marion County. The incumbent is Republican Julian Garrett, who was re-elected in 2022 with 61.6% of the vote. After a prostate cancer diagnosis, Garrett announced he would not be seeking re-election.

District 11 Republican primary Unofficial results
Party	Candidate	Votes	%
Republican	Hollie Zajicek	1,991	39.04%
Republican	Jon Thorup	1,570	30.78%
Republican	Mandee Shivers	1,528	29.96%
Write-in		11	0.22%
Total votes			5,100

District 11 general election
Party	Candidate	Votes	%
Democratic	Sinikka Waugh		
Republican	Hollie Zajicek		
Write-in			
Total votes			100.0

=== District 13 ===
The 13th district encompasses all of Davis, Monroe, and Wapello counties and part of Appanoose County. The incumbent is Republican Cherielynn Westrich, who was elected in 2022 with 64.9% of the vote.

District 13 Republican primary Unofficial results
Party	Candidate	Votes	%
Republican	Jeff Kulmatycki	2,311	53.89%
Republican	Austin Garmon	1,082	25.23%
Republican	Edwin Brand	889	20.73%
Write-in		6	0.14%
Total votes		4,288	100.00%

District 13 general election
Party	Candidate	Votes	%
Democratic	Brenda Case		
Republican	Jeff Kulmatycki		
Write-in			
Total votes			100.0

=== District 15 ===
The 15th district encompasses southern Des Moines, including the Des Moines International Airport. The incumbent is Democrat Tony Bisignano, who was re-elected in 2022 with 95.3% of the vote.

District 15 general election
Party	Candidate	Votes	%
Democratic	Tony Bisignano (incumbent)		
Write-in			
Total votes			100.0

=== District 17 ===
The 17th district encompasses central Des Moines. The incumbent is Democrat Izaah Knox, who was elected in 2022 with 76.6% of the vote. Knox is not seeking re-election, as he is running for Polk County Supervisor.

District 17 Democratic primary Unofficial results
Party	Candidate	Votes	%
Democratic	Samy El-Baroudi	2,627	53.18%
Democratic	Grace Van Cleave	2,303	46.62%
Write-in		10	0.20%
Total votes		4,940	100.00%

District 17 general election
Party	Candidate	Votes	%
Democratic	Samy El-Baroudi		
Republican	Ronald Langston		
Write-in			
Total votes			100.0

=== District 19 ===
The 19th district encompasses all of Jasper County as well as parts of Mahaska and Marion counties. The incumbent is Republican Ken Rozenboom, who was re-elected in 2022 with 68.6% of the vote. Rozenboom is not running for re-election.

District 19 Republican primary Unofficial results
Party	Candidate	Votes	%
Republican	Barb Kniff McCulla	4,192	67.83%
Republican	Bob Eschliman	1,979	32.02%
Write-in		9	0.15%
Total votes		6,180	100.00%

District 19 general election
Party	Candidate	Votes	%
Republican	Barb Kniff McCulla	18,036	63.2
Democratic	Zachary Mecham	10,497	36.8
Write-in		23	0.0
Total votes		28,556	100.0

=== District 21 ===
The 21st district encompasses the city of Ankeny. The incumbent is Republican Mike Bousselot, who was elected in 2022 with 50.9% of the vote. In April 2025, Bousselot formed an exploratory committee to explore running for governor in 2026, but ultimately decided to run in District 23.

District 21 general election
Party	Candidate	Votes	%
Republican	John Hollinrake		
Democratic	Heather Matson		
Write-in			
Total votes			100.0

=== District 23 ===
The 23rd district encompasses parts of Dallas and Polk counties. The incumbent is Republican Jack Whitver, who was re-elected in 2022 with 58.6% of the vote.

On September 16, 2025, he announced that he would not seek re-election.

Tony Thompson (Iowan) is the Democrat running for this seat.

Mike Bousselot was running with Whitver's support. He is overwhelmed with the thought of running for re-election in District 21, so he is moving out to a "safer" seat.

On August 14, 2026, Bousselot ended his campaign. On August 19, Wes Eros, Bousselot's primary opponent, was chosen as the replacement candidate.

District 23 Republican primary Unofficial results
Party	Candidate	Votes	%
Republican	Mike Bousselot	3,610	64.86%
Republican	Wes Enos	1,935	34.76%
Write-in		21	0.38%
Total votes		5,566	100.00%

District 23 general election
Party	Candidate	Votes	%
Republican	Wes Eros		
Democratic	Tony Thompson		
Write-in			
Total votes			100.0

=== District 25 ===
The 25th district encompasses the city of Ames. The incumbent is Democrat Herman Quirmbach, who was re-elected in 2022 with 75.7% of the vote.

District 25 general election
Party	Candidate	Votes	%
Democratic	Herman Quirmbach (incumbent)		
Write-in			
Total votes			100.0

=== District 27 ===
The 27th district encompasses all of Grundy, Hardin, and Poweshiek counties, most of Tama County, and part of Black Hawk County. The incumbent is Republican Annette Sweeney, who was re-elected in 2022 with 66.6% of the vote. She is running for re-election.

District 27 Republican primary Unofficial results
Party	Candidate	Votes	%
Republican	Annette Sweeney (incumbent)	3,502	68.53%
Republican	Rocky Damiano	1,596	31.23%
Write-in		12	0.23%
Total votes		5,110	100.00%

District 27 general election
Party	Candidate	Votes	%
Republican	Annette Sweeney (incumbent)		
Write-in			
Total votes			100.0

=== District 29 ===
The 29th district encompasses all of Bremer, Butler, and Chickasaw counties, as well as most of Floyd County. The incumbent is Republican Sandy Salmon, who was elected in 2022 with 65.4% of the vote.

District 29 general election
Party	Candidate	Votes	%
Republican	Sandy Salmon (incumbent)		
Democratic	Jim Vowels		
Write-in			
Total votes			100.0

=== District 31 ===
The 31st district encompasses the city of Waterloo. The incumbent is Democrat William Dotzler, who was re-elected in 2022 with 96.9% of the vote.

District 29 general election
Party	Candidate	Votes	%
Democratic	Timi Brown-Powers		
Write-in			
Total votes			100.0

=== District 33 ===
The 33rd district encompasses most of Dubuque and Jackson counties, as well as all of Jones County. The incumbent is Republican Carrie Koelker, who was re-elected in 2022 with 65.8% of the vote.

District 33 general election
Party	Candidate	Votes	%
Republican	Carrie Koelker (incumbent)		
Write-in			
Total votes			100.0

=== District 35 ===
The 35th district encompasses all of Clinton County and parts of Jackson and Scott counties. The incumbent is Democrat Mike Zimmer, who was elected in a 2025 special election with 51.7% of the vote.

==== Polling ====
Poll source	Date(s) administered	Sample size (Note: Key: A – all adults RV – registered voters LV – likely voters V – unclear)	Margin of error	Mike Zimmer (D)	Joe Stutting (R)	Undecided
State Navigate	September 29 – October 1, 2026	403 (LV)	± 4.9%	46% (Note: With voters who lean towards a given candidate)	43%	11%
State Navigate	September 29 – October 1, 2026	403 (LV)	± 4.9%	46%	41%	13%
State Navigate	September 29 – October 1, 2026	407 (LV) (Note: Weighted to recalled 2024 presidential vote)	± 4.9%	45%	47%	8%
State Navigate	September 29 – October 1, 2026	407 (LV)	± 4.9%	45%	44%	11%

District 35 general election
Party	Candidate	Votes	%
Republican	Joe Stutting		
Democratic	Mike Zimmer (incumbent)		
Write-in			
Total votes			100.0

=== District 37 ===
The 37th district encompasses the city of Marion. The incumbent is Democrat Molly Donahue, who was elected in 2022 with 56.0% of the vote.

District 37 general election
Party	Candidate	Votes	%
Democratic	Molly Donahue (incumbent)		
Republican	Randy Marzen		
Write-in			
Total votes			100.0

=== District 39 ===
The 39th district encompasses southern Cedar Rapids. The incumbent is Democrat Liz Bennett, who was elected in 2022 with 64.8% of the vote.

District 39 general election
Party	Candidate	Votes	%
Democratic	Liz Bennett (incumbent)		
Write-in			
Total votes			100.0

=== District 41 ===
The 41st district encompasses all of Cedar County, as well as parts of Muscatine and Scott counties. The incumbent is Republican Kerry Gruenhagen, who was elected in 2022 with 58.1% of the vote.

District 41 general election
Party	Candidate	Votes	%
Republican	Kerry Gruenhagen (incumbent)		
Democratic	Tom Wieck		
Write-in			
Total votes			100.0

=== District 43 ===
The 43rd district encompasses the cities of North Liberty, Coralville, and Solon. The incumbent is Democrat Zach Wahls, who was re-elected in 2022 with 97.5% of the vote.

Wahls is retiring to run for US Senate.

District 43 general election
Party	Candidate	Votes	%
Democratic	Meghann Foster		
Write-in			
Total votes			100.0

=== District 45 ===
The 45th district encompasses the city of Iowa City. The incumbent is Democrat Janice Weiner, who was elected in 2022 with 82.0% of the vote. She is running for re-election.

District 45 general election
Party	Candidate	Votes	%
Democratic	Janice Weiner (incumbent)		
Write-in			
Total votes			100.0

=== District 47 ===
The 47th district encompasses the cities of Bettendorf and Eldridge. The incumbent is Republican Scott Webster, who was elected in 2022 with 56.1% of the vote.

Ophthalmologist Dr. Nikhil Wagle, who is also a Pleasant Valley School board member, announced in August 2025 that he would run for this seat.

District 47 general election
Party	Candidate	Votes	%
Democratic	Nikhil Wagle		
Republican	Scott Webster (incumbent)		
Write-in			
Total votes			100.0

=== District 49 ===
The 49th district encompasses the city of Davenport. The incumbent is Democrat Cindy Winckler, who was elected in 2022 with 93.3% of the vote.

District 49 general election
Party	Candidate	Votes	%
Republican	Cynthia Mensendick		
Democratic	Cindy Winckler (incumbent)		
Write-in			
Total votes			100.0
