= List of current members of the Iowa Senate =

The Iowa Senate is the upper house of the Iowa General Assembly, the legislature of the U.S. state of Iowa. One State Senator is elected from each of the state's 50 electoral districts, with each Senate district containing two House of Representatives districts. As of January 28, 2025, 16 of those seats are held by Democrats and 34 by Republicans. The presiding officer is the President of the Senate, who is chosen by the majority party and elected by the Senate. In addition, senators elect a President pro tempore, chosen in the same manner as the President, and the respective party caucuses elect a majority and minority leader, a majority and minority whip, and assistant party leaders.

Senators serve for four-year terms and are elected in even-numbered years, with half of the Senate elected every two years in the general election on election day, as part of the presidential and midterm elections. Newly elected senators are sworn in and begin work on the second Monday of January. The governor calls a special election to replace a senator who resigns in office before their term expires. Senators are not term-limited.

Senators generally serve on several standing committees and often serve on joint appropriations subcommittees, permanent statutory committees and various boards and commissions.

== Party composition ==
Party composition as of January 28, 2025.
Affiliation	Members
Republican	34
Democratic	16
Total	50

== Leadership ==
Senate leadership as of August 4, 2025
Position	Name	Party	District
President of the Senate	Amy Sinclair	Republican	12
President pro tempore	Ken Rozenboom	Republican	19
Majority Leader	Jack Whitver	Republican	23
Minority Leader	Janice Weiner	Democratic	45

== Senators ==
Iowa senators as of August 26, 2025
District	County(ies) represented	Portrait	Senator	Party	First elected	Standing committee leader	Appropriations subcommittee member
1	Woodbury		Catelin Drey	Democratic	2025 (Note: First elected in an August 26, 2025 special election)		
2	Plymouth and Sioux		Jeff Taylor	Republican	2020	Education (Vice Chair)	Education (Chair)
3	Osceola, O'Brien, Clay, Cherokee, and Buena Vista		Lynn Evans	Republican	2022		Education
4	Calhoun, Pocahontas, Sac, and Webster		Tim Kraayenbrink	Republican	2014	Appropriations (Chair), Technology (Vice Chair)	
5	Clay, Dickinson, Emmet, Kossuth, Palo Alto and Winnebago		Dave Rowley	Republican	2020		Administration and Regulation Appropriations (Chair)
6	Audubon, Carroll, Crawford, Ida, and Shelby		Jason Schultz	Republican	2014	State Government (Chair)	
7	Cherokee, Monona, Plymouth, and Woodbury		Kevin Alons	Republican	2022		Health and Human Services
8	Fremont, Harrison, Mills, and Pottawattamie,		Mark Costello	Republican	2014 (Note: First elected in a December 30, 2014 special election.)	Ethics (Vice Chair)	Health and Human Services (Chair)
9	Adams, Cass, Montgomery, Page, Ringgold, Taylor, and Union		Tom Shipley	Republican	2014	Ethics (Chair), Natural Resources and Environment (Vice Chair)	Agriculture and Natural Resources
10	Pottawattamie		Dan Dawson	Republican	2016	Ways and Means (Chair)	
11	Marion and Warren		Julian Garrett	Republican	2013 (Note: First elected in a November 19, 2013 special election.)	Judiciary (Vice Chair)	Justice System (Chair)
12	Adair, Appanoose, Clarke, Dallas, Decatur, Lucas, Madison, Union and Wayne		Amy Sinclair	Republican	2012	Government Oversight (Chair), Rules and Administration (Vice Chair)	
13	Appanoose, Davis, Monroe, and Wapello		Cherielynn Westrich	Republican	2022		Justice System (Vice Chair)
14	Dallas		Sarah Trone Garriott	Democratic	2020	Health and Human Services (Ranking Member)	Health and Human Services
15	Polk		Tony Bisignano	Democratic	2014	State Government (Ranking Member), Agriculture (Ranking Member)	
16	Dallas and Polk		Claire Celsi	Democratic	2018	Government Oversight (Ranking Member)	Administration and Regulation (Ranking Member)
17	Polk		Izaah Knox	Democratic	2022	Natural Resources and Environment (Ranking Member)	Education
18	Polk	Official Portrait for the 85th General Assembly	Janet Petersen	Democratic	2012	Appropriations (Ranking Member)	Transportation, Infrastructure, and Capitals (Ranking Member)
19	Jasper, Mahaska, and Marion	Official Portrait for the 85th General Assembly	Ken Rozenboom	Republican	2012	Agriculture (Vice Chair), Education (Chair)	
20	Polk		Mike Pike	Republican	2024		
21	Polk		Mike Bousselot	Republican	2022	Commerce (Vice Chair)	Transportation, Infrastructure, and Capitals (Vice Chair)
22	Polk		Matt Blake	Democratic	2024		
23	Dallas and Polk	Official Portrait for the 85th General Assembly	Jack Whitver	Republican	2011 (Note: First elected in a January 18, 2011 special election.)	Rules and Administration (Chair)	
24	Boone, Dallas, Greene, Guthrie, and Story		Jesse Green	Republican	2020	Local Government (Chair)	
25	Story	Official Portrait for the 85th General Assembly	Herman Quirmbach	Democratic	2002	Education (Ranking Member)	Economic Development
26	Marshall and Story		Kara Warme	Republican	2024		
27	Black Hawk, Grundy, Hardin, Poweshiek, and Tama		Annette Sweeney	Republican	2018	Natural Resources and Environment (Chair)	Agriculture and Natural Resources (Vice Chair)
28	Franklin, Hancock, Hamilton, Humbolt, and Wright	Official Portrait for the 85th General Assembly	Dennis Guth	Republican	2012	N/A	Administration and Regulation (Vice Chair)
29	Bremer, Butler, Chickasaw, and Floyd		Sandy Salmon	Republican	2022	Veterans Affairs (Vice Chair)	Justice System
30	Cerro Gordo, Floyd, Mitchell, and Worth		Doug Campbell	Republican	2024		
31	Black Hawk	Official Portrait for the 85th General Assembly	William Dotzler	Democratic	2002	Veterans Affairs (Ranking Member)	Economic Development (Ranking Member)
32	Allamakee, Clayton, Fayette, Howard, and Winneshiek		Mike Klimesh	Republican	2020	Government Oversight (Vice Chair); Transportation (Chair)	Health and Human Services
33	Dubuque, Jones and Jackson		Carrie Koelker	Republican	2018	Was and Means (Vice Chair)	Transportation, Infrastructure, and Capitals (Chair)
34	Black Hawk, Buchanan, Delaware, Dubuque, and Fayette	Official Portrait for the 85th General Assembly	Dan Zumbach	Republican	2012	Appropriations(Vice Chair)	Agriculture and Natural Resources (Chair)
35	Clinton, Jackson, and Scott		Mike Zimmer	Democratic	2025 (Note: First elected in a January 28, 2025 special election.)		
36	Dubuque		Thomas Townsend	Democratic	2024		
37	Linn		Molly Donahue	Democratic	2022	Workforce (Ranking Member)	Health and Human Services (Ranking Member)
38	Benton, Black Hawk, and Tama		Dave Sires	Republican	2024		
39	Linn		Liz Bennett	Democratic	2022	Technology (Ranking Member)	Transportation, Infrastructure, and Capitals
40	Linn		Art Staed	Democratic	2024		
41	Cedar, Muscatine, and Scott		Kerry Gruenhagen	Republican	2022		Economic Development
42	Benton and Linn		Charlie McClintock	Republican	2022	Workforce (Vice Chair)	Justice System
43	Johnson		Zach Wahls	Democratic	2018	Rules and Administration (Ranking Member)	
44	Henry, Jefferson, Keokuk, Mahaska, and Van Buren		Adrian Dickey	Republican	2021 (Note: First elected in a January 26, 2021 special election.)	Workforce (Chair); Transportation (Vice Chair)	Economic Development
45	Johnson		Janice Weiner	Democratic	2022	Local Government (Ranking Member)	Agriculture and Natural Resources
46	Iowa, Johnson and Washington		Dawn Driscoll	Republican	2020	Agriculture (Chair)	
47	Scott		Scott Webster	Republican	2022		Administration and Regulation
48	Des Moines, Henry, Louisa, and Muscatine		Mark Lofgren	Republican	2016	Local Government (Vice Chair)	Economic Development (Chair)
49	Scott		Cindy Winckler	Democratic	2022	Ethics (Ranking Member)	Education (Ranking Member)
50	Des Moines and Lee		Jeff Reichman	Republican	2020	Veterans Affairs (Chair)	

== See also ==
- List of members of the 89th session of the Iowa Senate
- List of current members of the Iowa House of Representatives
- Iowa Senate
