= 2022 Iowa Senate election =

- November 8, 2022

34 out of 50 seats in the Iowa State Senate 26 seats needed for a majority
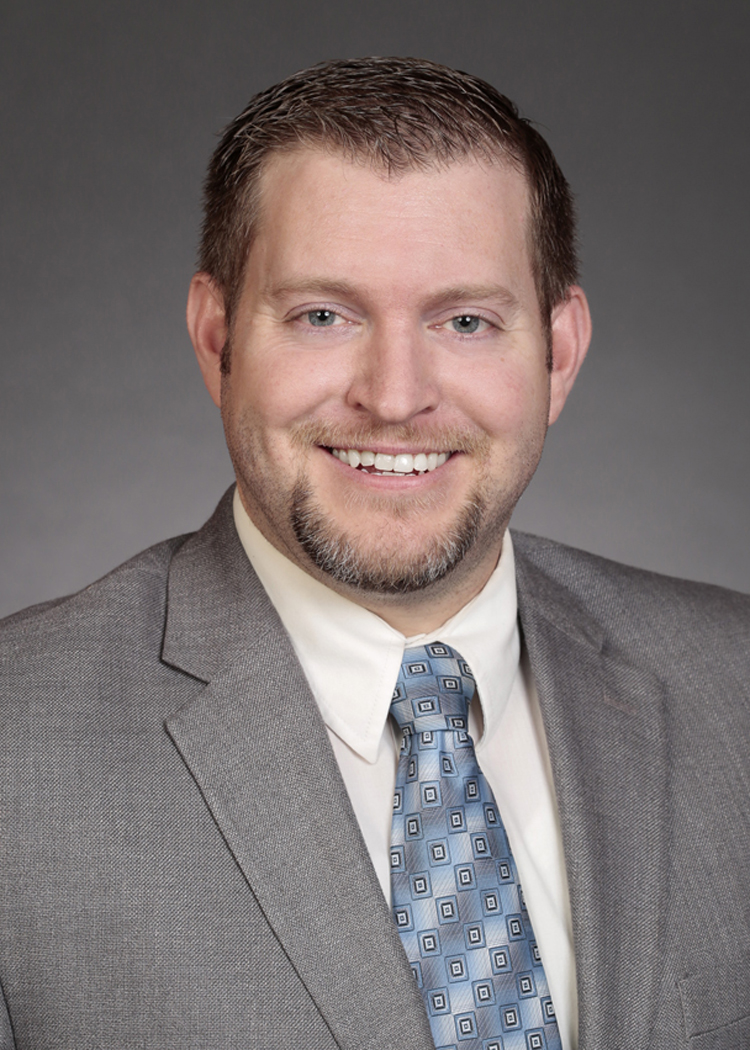

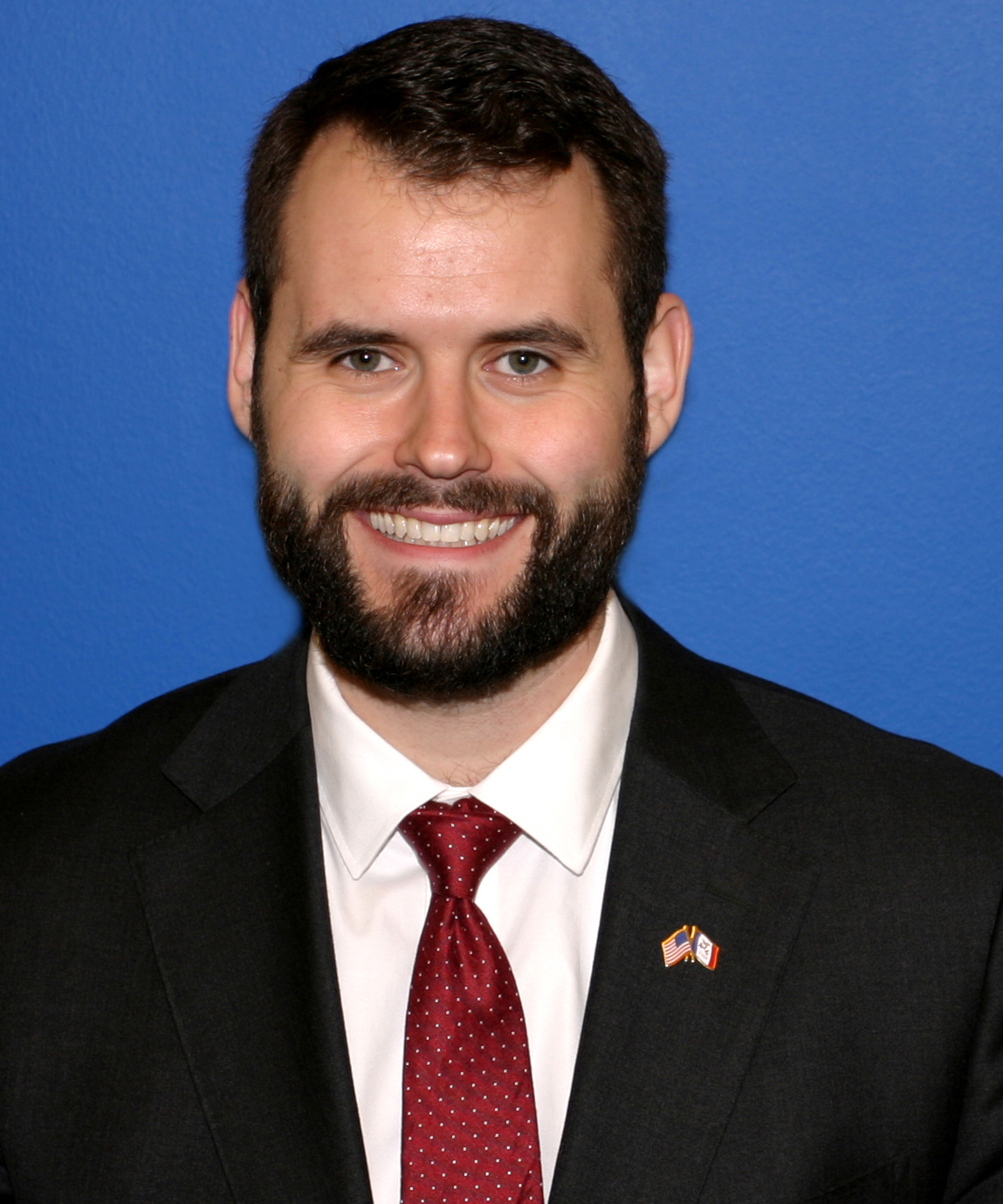
	Majority party	Minority party
Leader	Jake Chapman (lost re-election)	Zach Wahls
Party	Republican	Democratic
Leader's seat	10th district	37th district
Last election	19 seats, 58.87%	6 seats, 40.45%
Seats before	32	18
Seats won	22	12
Seats after	34	16
Seat change	▲2	▼2
Popular vote	419,989	341,775
Percentage	54.05%	43.98%
- Results of the elections: Republican gain Democratic gain Republican hold Democratic hold No election
President of the Senate before election
Jake Chapman
Republian
Elected President of the Senate
Amy Sinclair
Republian

The 2022 Iowa Senate elections were held on November 8, 2022, to elect members of the Iowa Senate from 25 odd-numbered districts. Senators serve four-year terms in single-member constituencies, with half of the seats up for election each cycle. Additionally, because the 2022 elections were the first elections since the 2020 United States Census and subsequent redistricting, elections were also held in 9 even-numbered districts where redistricting resulted in more than one incumbent wishing to represent the district. Primary elections were held on June 7.

== Retirements ==
=== Democrats ===
- District 27: Amanda Ragan retired.
- District 33: Rob Hogg retired.
- District 34: Liz Mathis retired to run for U. S. representative from Iowa's 2nd congressional district.
- District 43: Joe Bolkcom retired.
- District 45: Jim Lykam retired.

=== Republicans ===
- District 3: Jim Carlin retired to run for U.S. senator.
- District 6: Craig Williams retired.
- District 15: Zach Nunn retired to run for U. S. representative from Iowa's 3rd congressional district.
- District 32: Craig Johnson retired to run for state representative from District 67.
- District 44: Tim Goodwin retired.
- District 47: Roby Smith retired to run for treasurer of Iowa.

== Predictions ==
Source	Ranking	As of
Sabato's Crystal Ball	Likely R	May 19, 2022

== Results ==
- Note: Districts that did not hold elections in 2022 are not listed here.

State Senate district	Incumbent	Party	Elected Senator	Party
1st	Jackie Smith	Dem	Rocky De Witt	Rep
3rd	Jim Carlin	Rep	K. Lynn Evans	Rep
4th	Tim Kraayenbrink	Rep	Tim Kraayenbrink	Rep
5th	Dave Rowley	Rep	Dave Rowley	Rep
6th	Jason Schultz	Rep	Jason Schultz	Rep
6th	Craig Williams	Rep	Jason Schultz	Rep
7th			Kevin Alons	Rep
9th	Tom Shipley	Rep	Tom Shipley	Rep
11th	Julian Garrett	Rep	Julian Garrett	Rep
13th			Cherielynn Westrich	Rep
14th	Jake Chapman	Rep	Sarah Trone Garriott	Dem
14th	Sarah Trone Garriott	Dem	Sarah Trone Garriott	Dem
15th	Zach Nunn	Rep	Tony Bisignano	Dem
15th	Tony Bisignano	Dem	Tony Bisignano	Dem
16th	Claire Celsi	Dem	Claire Celsi	Dem
17th			Izaah Knox	Dem
19th	Ken Rozenboom	Rep	Ken Rozenboom	Rep
21st			Mike Bousselot	Rep
23rd	Jack Whitver	Rep	Jack Whitver	Rep
25th	Herman Quirmbach	Dem	Herman Quirmbach	Dem
27th	Amanda Ragan	Dem	Annette Sweeney	Rep
27th	Annette Sweeney	Rep	Annette Sweeney	Rep
29th			Sandy Salmon	Rep
30th	Waylon Brown	Rep	Waylon Brown	Rep
31st	William Dotzler	Dem	William Dotzler	Dem
33rd	Rob Hogg	Dem	Carrie Koelker	Rep
33rd	Carrie Koelker	Rep	Carrie Koelker	Rep
35th	Chris Cournoyer	Rep	Chris Cournoyer	Rep
37th	Liz Mathis	Dem	Molly Donahue	Dem
39th			Liz Bennett	Dem
40th	Todd Taylor	Dem	Todd Taylor	Dem
41st			Kerry Gruenhagen	Rep
42nd			Charlie McClintock	Rep
43rd	Zach Wahls	Dem	Zach Wahls	Dem
44th	Adrian Dickey	Rep	Adrian Dickey	Rep
44th	Tim Goodwin	Rep	Adrian Dickey	Rep
45th	Jim Lykam	Dem	Janice Weiner	Dem
46th	Kevin Kinney	Dem	Dawn Driscoll	Rep
46th	Dawn Driscoll	Rep	Dawn Driscoll	Rep
47th	Roby Smith	Rep	Scott Webster	Rep
49th	Chris Cournoyer	Rep	Cindy Winckler	Dem

=== Closest races ===
Seats where the margin of victory was under 10%:

1. State Senate district 21, 1.92%
2. State Senate district 14, 2.98%
3. State Senate district 46, 8.0%
4. State Senate district 40, 9.32%

== Detailed results ==
- Note: If a district does not list a primary, then that district did not have a competitive primary (i.e., there may have only been one candidate file for that district).

=== District 1 ===
Results by precinct De Witt: 70–80% De Witt: 60–70% De Witt: 50–60% Smith: 50–60% Smith: 60–70%

Iowa Senate, District 1 general election, 2022
Party	Candidate	Votes	%
Republican	Rocky De Witt	7,700	55.06%
Democratic	Jackie Smith (incumbent) (Note: Redistricted from district 7 to 1.)	6,256	44.73%
Write-in		30	0.21%
Total votes		13,986	100.00%
Republican gain from Democratic			

=== District 3 ===
Iowa Senate, District 3 Republican primary election, 2022
Party	Candidate	Votes	%
Republican	Lynn Evans	3,540	64.82%
Republican	Anthony LaBruna	1,921	35.18%
Total votes		5,461	100.00%

Iowa Senate, District 3 general election, 2022
Party	Candidate	Votes	%
Republican	Lynn Evans	17,609	99.14%
Write-in		152	0.86%
Total votes		17,761	100.00%
Republican hold			

=== District 4 ===
Iowa Senate, District 4 Republican primary election, 2022
Party	Candidate	Votes	%
Republican	Tim Kraayenbrink (incumbent) (Note: Redistricted from district 5 to 4.)	3,939	100.00%
Total votes		3,939	100.00%

Iowa Senate, District 4 general election, 2022
Party	Candidate	Votes	%
Republican	Tim Kraayenbrink (incumbent)	18,408	97.75%
Write-in		424	2.25%
Total votes		18,832	100.00%
Republican hold			

=== District 5 ===
Iowa Senate, District 5 Republican primary election, 2022
Party	Candidate	Votes	%
Republican	Dave Rowley (incumbent) (Note: Redistricted from district 1 to 5.)	3,405	67.60%
Republican	David D. Dow	1,632	32.40%
Total votes		5,037	100.00%

Iowa Senate, District 5 general election, 2022
Party	Candidate	Votes	%
Republican	Dave Rowley (incumbent)	22,597	98.54%
Write-in		335	1.46%
Total votes		22,932	100.00%
Republican hold			

=== District 6 ===
Iowa Senate, District 6 general election, 2022
Party	Candidate	Votes	%
Republican	Jason Schultz (incumbent) (Note: Redistricted from district 9 to 6.)	17,509	82.90%
Libertarian	David Davis	3,549	16.80%
Write-in		62	0.29%
Total votes		21,120	100.00%
Republican hold			

=== District 7 ===
- Democratic senator Jackie Smith was redistricted from District 7 to 1. No Democratic candidate filed in District 7; therefore, the district was an automatic gain for Republicans.

Iowa Senate, District 7 general election, 2022
Party	Candidate	Votes	%
Republican	Kevin Alons	18,470	97.99%
Write-in		379	2.01%
Total votes		18,849	100.00%
Republican gain from Democratic			

=== District 9 ===
Iowa Senate, District 9 general election, 2022
Party	Candidate	Votes	%
Republican	Tom Shipley (incumbent) (Note: Redistricted from district 11 to 9.)	18,106	76.85%
Democratic	Tripp Narup	5,436	23.07%
Write-in		17	0.07%
Total votes		23,559	100.00%
Republican hold			

=== District 11 ===
Iowa Senate, District 11 general election, 2022
Party	Candidate	Votes	%
Republican	Julian B. Garrett (incumbent) (Note: Redistricted from district 13 to 11.)	16,941	61.59%
Democratic	Lisa Fleishman	10,542	38.32%
Write-in		25	0.09%
Total votes		27,508	100.00%
Republican hold			

=== District 13 ===
Iowa Senate, District 13 general election, 2022
Party	Candidate	Votes	%
Republican	Cherielynn Westrich	13,336	64.89%
Democratic	Matt Greiner	7,207	35.07%
Write-in		10	0.05%
Total votes		20,553	100.00%
Republican hold			

=== District 14 ===
Iowa Senate, District 14 general election, 2022
Party	Candidate	Votes	%
Democratic	Sarah Trone Garriott (incumbent) (Note: Redistricted from district 22 to 14.)	15,095	51.44%
Republican	Jake Chapman (incumbent) (Note: Redistricted from district 10 to 14.)	14,222	48.46%
Write-in		29	0.10%
Total votes		29,346	100.00%
Democratic gain from Republican			

=== District 15 ===
- Republican state senator Zach Nunn decided to run for the US House of Representatives in Iowa's 3rd congressional district instead of re-election in this district in the Iowa State Senate. No Republican candidate filed in District 15; therefore, the district was an automatic gain for Democrats.

Iowa Senate, District 15 general election, 2022
Party	Candidate	Votes	%
Democratic	Tony Bisignano (incumbent) (Note: Redistricted from district 17 to 15.)	12,074	95.28%
Write-in		598	4.72%
Total votes		12,672	100.00%
Democratic gain from Republican			

=== District 16 ===
Iowa Senate, District 16 Republican primary election, 2022
Party	Candidate	Votes	%
Republican	Bradley D. Price	1,576	50.40%
Republican	Shad Clayton	1,551	49.60%
Total votes		3,127	100.00%

Iowa Senate, District 16 general election, 2022
Party	Candidate	Votes	%
Democratic	Claire Celsi (incumbent) (Note: Redistricted from district 21 to 16.)	16,263	58.22%
Republican	Bradley D. Price	11,692	41.78%
Write-in		28	0.10%
Total votes		27,983	100.00%
Democratic hold			

=== District 17 ===
Iowa Senate, District 17 Democratic primary election, 2022
Party	Candidate	Votes	%
Democratic	Izaah Knox	2,726	67.11%
Democratic	Grace Van Cleave	1,336	32.89%
Total votes		4,062	100.00%

Iowa Senate, District 17 general election, 2022
Party	Candidate	Votes	%
Democratic	Izaah Knox	10,286	76.56%
Libertarian	ToyA S. Johnson	1,690	12.58%
Independent	Alejandro Murguia-Ortiz	1,297	9.65%
Write-in		162	1.21%
Total votes		13,435	100.00%
Democratic hold			

=== District 19 ===
Iowa Senate, District 19 general election, 2022
Party	Candidate	Votes	%
Republican	Ken Rozenboom (incumbent) (Note: Redistricted from district 40 to 19.)	18,118	68.58%
Democratic	Tyler Stewart	8,283	31.35%
Write-in		18	0.07%
Total votes		26,419	100.00%
Republican hold			

=== District 21 ===
Iowa Senate, District 21 general election, 2022
Party	Candidate	Votes	%
Republican	Mike Bousselot	14,896	50.92%
Democratic	Todd Brady	14,336	49.00%
Write-in		24	0.08%
Total votes		29,256	100.0%
Republican gain from Democratic			

=== District 23 ===
Iowa Senate, District 23 general election, 2022
Party	Candidate	Votes	%
Republican	Jack Whitver (incumbent) (Note: Redistricted from district 19 to 23.)	17,276	58.64%
Democratic	Matt Pries	12,159	41.27%
Write-in		26	0.08%
Total votes		29,461	100.0%
Republican gain from Democratic			

=== District 25 ===
- Republican senator Annette Sweeney (Note: Redistricted from district 25 to 27.) was redistricted from District 25 to 27. No Republican candidate filed in District 25; therefore, the district was an automatic gain for Democrats.

Iowa Senate, District 25 general election, 2022
Party	Candidate	Votes	%
Democratic	Herman C. Quirmbach (incumbent) (Note: Redistricted from district 23 to 25.)	14,258	75.69%
Libertarian	Jordan Taylor	4,451	23.63%
Write-in		129	0.68%
Total votes		18,838	100.0%
Democratic gain from Republican			

=== District 27 ===
Iowa Senate, District 27 general election, 2022
Party	Candidate	Votes	%
Republican	Annette Sweeney (incumbent)	16,896	66.63%
Democratic	Sam Cox	8,429	33.24%
Write-in		34	0.13%
Total votes		25,359	100.0%
Republican gain from Democratic			

=== District 29 ===
Iowa Senate, District 29 general election, 2022
Party	Candidate	Votes	%
Republican	Sandy Salmon	17,235	65.40%
Democratic	Jenn Wolff	9,101	34.53%
Write-in		17	0.06%
Total votes		26,353	100.0%
Republican hold			

=== District 30 ===
Iowa Senate, District 30 general election, 2022
Party	Candidate	Votes	%
Republican	Waylon Brown (incumbent) (Note: Redistricted from district 26 to 30.)	15,288	60.23%
Democratic	Whitney Mixdorf	10,082	39.72%
Write-in		12	60.23%
Total votes		25,382	100.0%
Republican gain from Democratic			

=== District 31 ===
Iowa Senate, District 31 general election, 2022
Party	Candidate	Votes	%
Democratic	William "Bill" Dotzler (incumbent)	13,282	96.93%
Write-in		420	3.07%
Total votes		13,702	100.0%
Democratic hold			

=== District 33 ===
Iowa Senate, District 33 general election, 2022
Party	Candidate	Votes	%
Republican	Carrie Koelker (incumbent) (Note: Redistricted from district 29 to 33.)	17,764	65.82%
Democratic	Matt Robinson	9,213	34.14%
Write-in		10	0.04%
Total votes		26,987	100.0%
Republican gain from Democratic			

=== District 35 ===
Iowa Senate, District 35 general election, 2022
Party	Candidate	Votes	%
Republican	Chris Cournoyer (incumbent) (Note: Redistricted from district 49 to 35.)	14,252	59.76%
Democratic	Joe Brown	9,292	38.96%
Write-in		6	0.03%
Total votes		23,850	100.0%
Republican gain from Democratic			

=== District 37 ===
Iowa Senate, District 37 Democratic primary election, 2022
Party	Candidate	Votes	%
Democratic	Molly Donahue	2,351	51.57%
Democratic	Austin Frerick	2,208	48.43%
Total votes		4,559	100.00%

Iowa Senate, District 37 general election, 2022
Party	Candidate	Votes	%
Democratic	Molly Donahue	15,038	55.99%
Republican	Kurt Alan Bendixen	11,797	43.93%
Write-in		22	0.08%
Total votes		26,857	100.0%
Democratic hold			

=== District 39 ===
Iowa Senate, District 39 Democratic primary election, 2022
Party	Candidate	Votes	%
Democratic	Liz Bennett	3,214	73.05%
Democratic	Joseph Zahorik	1,186	26.95%
Total votes		4,400	100.00%

Iowa Senate, District 39 general election, 2022
Party	Candidate	Votes	%
Democratic	Liz Bennett	13,257	64.79%
Republican	Edward Bernie Hayes	7,190	35.14%
Write-in		15	0.07%
Total votes		20,462	100.0%
Democratic hold			

=== District 40 ===
Iowa Senate, District 40 general election, 2022
Party	Candidate	Votes	%
Democratic	Todd Taylor (incumbent) (Note: Redistricted from district 35 to 40.)	14,078	54.61%
Republican	Kris G. Gulick	11,674	45.29%
Write-in		25	0.10%
Total votes		25,777	100.0%
Democratic gain from Republican			

=== District 41 ===
Iowa Senate, District 41 Republican primary election, 2022
Party	Candidate	Votes	%
Republican	Kerry Gruenhagen	2,068	59.00%
Republican	Alan Weets	1,437	41.00%
Total votes		3,505	100.00%

Iowa Senate, District 41 Democratic primary election, 2022
Party	Candidate	Votes	%
Democratic	Deb VanderGaast	1,739	74.16%
Democratic	Nikole Tutton	606	25.84%
Total votes		2,345	100.00%

Iowa Senate, District 41 general election, 2022
Party	Candidate	Votes	%
Republican	Kerry Gruenhagen	13,179	58.12%
Democratic	Deb VanderGaast	9,480	41.77%
Write-in		15	0.11%
Total votes		22,674	100.0%
Republican hold			

=== District 42 ===
Iowa Senate, District 42 Republican primary election, 2022
Party	Candidate	Votes	%
Republican	Charlie McClintock	1,518	40.66%
Republican	Colman Silbernagel	1,516	40.61%
Republican	Justin Wasson	699	18.72%
Total votes		3,733	100.00%

Iowa Senate, District 42 general election, 2022
Party	Candidate	Votes	%
Republican	Charlie McClintock	17,420	58.84%
Democratic	Jessica Wiskus	11,222	37.90%
Independent	Bruce Gardner	954	3.22%
Write-in		12	0.04%
Total votes		29,608	100.0%
Republican hold			

=== District 43 ===
Iowa Senate, District 43 general election, 2022
Party	Candidate	Votes	%
Democratic	Zach Wahls (incumbent) (Note: Redistricted from district 37 to 43.)	21,146	97.46%
Write-in		552	2.54%
Total votes		21,698	100.0%
Democratic hold			

=== District 44 ===
Iowa Senate, District 44 general election, 2022
Party	Candidate	Votes	%
Republican	Adrian Dickey (incumbent) (Note: Redistricted from district 41 to 44.)	15,318	66.49%
Democratic	Rich Taylor	7,699	33.42%
Write-in		22	0.10%
Total votes		23,039	100.0%
Republican hold			

=== District 45 ===
Iowa Senate, District 45 Democratic primary election, 2022
Party	Candidate	Votes	%
Democratic	Janice Weiner	6,297	86.11%
Democratic	John Raley	1,016	13.89%
Total votes		7,313	100.00%

Iowa Senate, District 45 general election, 2022
Party	Candidate	Votes	%
Democratic	Janice Weiner	20,273	81.98%
Republican	Harold Weilbrenner	4,428	17.91%
Write-in		27	0.11%
Total votes		24,728	100.0%
Democratic hold			

=== District 46 ===
Iowa Senate, District 46 general election, 2022
Party	Candidate	Votes	%
Republican	Dawn Driscoll (incumbent) (Note: Redistricted from district 38 to 46.)	14,800	53.79%
Democratic	Kevin Kinney (incumbent) (Note: Redistricted from district 39 to 46.)	12,695	46.14%
Write-in		18	0.07%
Total votes		27,513	100.0%
Republican hold			

=== District 47 ===
Iowa Senate, District 47 Republican primary election, 2022
Party	Candidate	Votes	%
Republican	Scott Webster	2,580	71.99%
Republican	Barry A. Long	1,004	28.01%
Total votes		3,584	100.00%

Iowa Senate, District 47 general election, 2022
Party	Candidate	Votes	%
Republican	Scott Webster	15,568	56.12%
Democratic	Mary Kathleen Figaro	12,151	43.80%
Write-in		23	0.08%
Total votes		27,742	100.0%
Republican hold			

=== District 49 ===
- Republican senator Chris Cournoyer was redistricted from District 49 to 35. No Republican candidate filed in District 49; therefore, the district was an automatic gain for Democrats.

Iowa Senate, District 49 general election, 2022
Party	Candidate	Votes	%
Democratic	Cindy Winckler	12,062	93.30%
Write-in		866	6.70%
Total votes		12,928	100.0%
Democratic gain from Republican			
