= Joe Stutting =

American politician

Member-elect of the Iowa Senate from the 35th district
- Assuming office January 1, 2027
- Succeeding: Mike Zimmer

Personal details
- Party: Republican
- Website: Campaign website

Joe Stutting is an American politician. A member of the Republican Party, he is the member-elect of the Iowa State Senate for the 35th district, having won election in 2026. He unseated Democrat Mike Zimmer in the 2026 election. He is the Superintendent of the North Scott Community School District.
