= Forrest Ashcraft =

American politician (1922–2004)

Member of the Iowa Senate from the 41st district
- In office January 10, 1977 – January 7, 1979
- Preceded by: Bill Gluba
- Succeeded by: Patrick J. Deluhery

Personal details
- Born: July 13, 1922 Davenport, Iowa
- Died: February 19, 2004 (aged 81) Davenport, Iowa
- Party: Republican

Forrest Ashcraft (July 13, 1922 – February 19, 2004) was an American politician who served in the Iowa Senate from the 41st district from 1977 to 1979.

He died on February 19, 2004, in Davenport, Iowa at age 81.
