= Meghann Foster =

American politician

Member-elect of the Iowa Senate from the 43rd district
- Assuming office January 1, 2027
- Succeeding: Zach Wahls

Personal details
- Party: Democratic
- Website: Campaign website

Meghann Foster is an American politician. A member of the Democratic Party, she is the member-elect of the Iowa State Senate for the 43rd district, having won election in 2026. She will succeed fellow Democrat Zach Wahls in the 2026 election. She is the former mayor of Coralville, Iowa.
