= Joseph Hollman (politician) =

American politician

Joseph Hollman was an American politician.

A native of Maryland, Hollman was born on 29 April 1825. He worked as a storekeeper until the age of seventeen, and subsequently attended Jefferson College in Pennsylvania for two years. Hollman then studied law with John Thompson Mason, passing the Maryland bar in 1845. He soon moved to Lee County, Iowa, where he remained until 1854, when he moved to Nebraska to observe the effects of the Kansas–Nebraska Act. Later that year, Hollman's work with the federal government required him to relocate to Utah.

After two years in Utah, Hollman returned to Iowa, living in Dakota County until 1859, when he resettled in Lee County. Hollman represented District 1, which included Lee County at the time, in the Iowa Senate as a Democrat from 1866 to 1870. After stepping down from the state senate, Hollman remained a Lee County resident until 1875. He then moved near Dakota City, Nebraska, and contested the 1876 United States House of Representatives election there, losing to Frank Welch.
