= Senator Dickey =

Senator Dickey may refer to:

- Adrian Dickey (born 1973), Iowa State Senate
- Henry L. Dickey (1832–1910), Ohio State Senate
- John Dickey (American politician) (1794–1853), Pennsylvania State Senate
