= Isaac Snook =

American politician

Isaac N. Snook (1848–1931) was an American politician.

Snook was born in Union County, Pennsylvania, in 1848. The family, which included eight children, settled in Lee County, Iowa, in June 1854. Snook married Rachel Box in 1871. The couple had six children. Unfortunately, Box died when their eldest daughter was fifteen. Snook managed his farm and threshing business for fifty years and served as president of the Iowa Threshermen's Association for fourteen years. He also held various local offices, including a sixteen-year term as a justice of the peace, before being elected to the Iowa Senate in 1922. As a Democrat, he represented District 1 from 1923 to 1927. Snook died on November 2, 1931.
