= Tod Bowman =

American politician (born 1965)

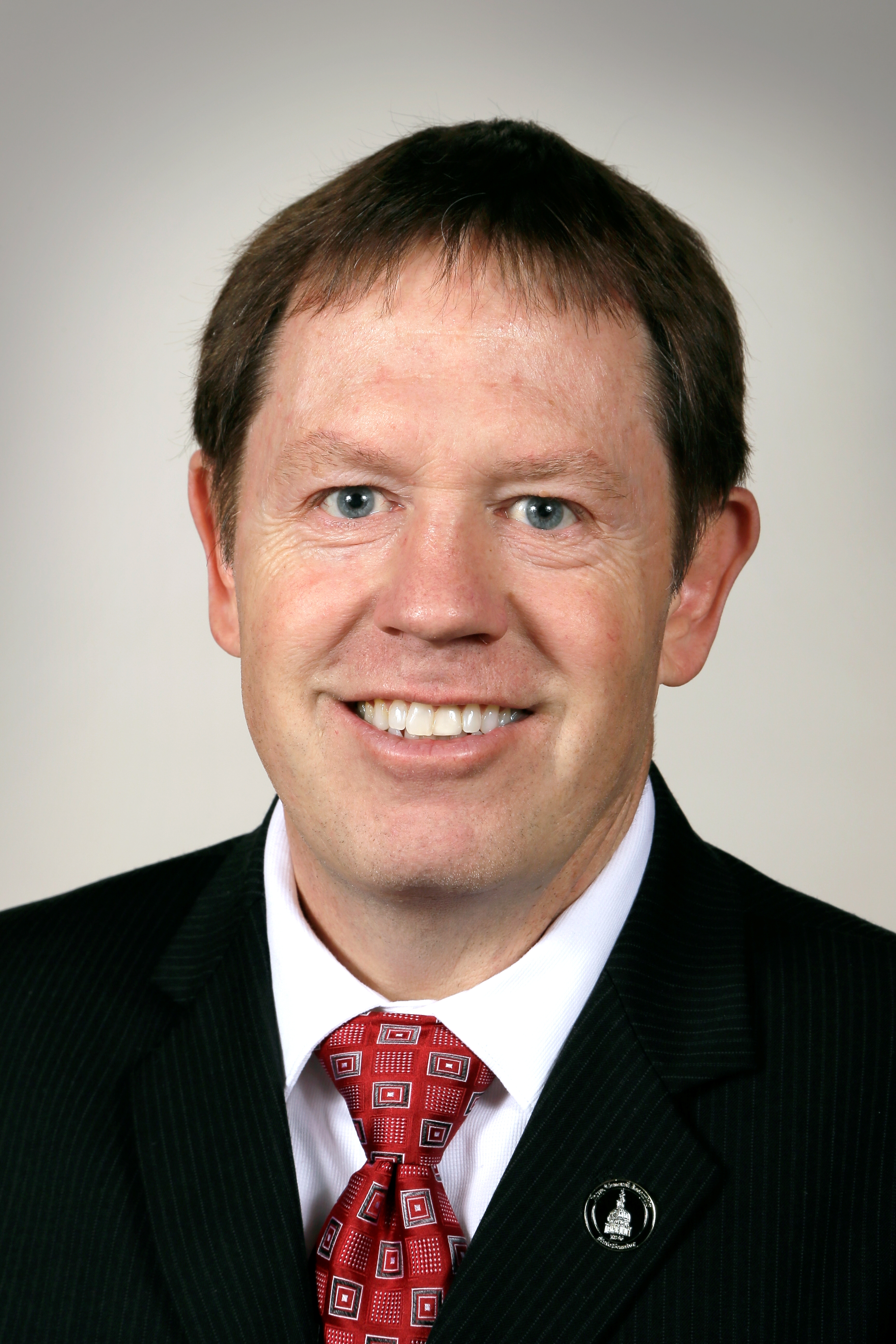

Member of the Iowa Senate from the 29th district
- In office 2011–2019
- Succeeded by: Carrie Koelker

Personal details
- Born: March 29, 1965 (age 61) Maquoketa, Iowa, U.S.
- Party: Democratic
- Education: Luther College (BA); Western Illinois University (M.Ed.)
- Occupation: Legislator
- Website: Official Website

Tod R. Bowman, (born March 29, 1965) is a Democratic politician and legislator from the state of Iowa. He was elected to the Iowa Senate in 2010. He represents District 29, which holds Clinton, Dubuque, and Jackson counties.

== Early life and education ==
Bowman is a graduate of Maquoketa Community High School in 1983. Senator Bowman then enrolled at Luther College where he went to receive his B.A. in Social Sciences. Bowman later went on to attain a Master of Education from Western Illinois University. After receiving his degree, Bowman taught Political Science, Psychology, and Sociology at Maquoketa High School and Clinton Community College. Bowman also taught high school wrestling and continues to coach football in the school district. Bowman now teaches government at the high school and Clinton Community College on the high school's campus. He also is an active member of the First Lutheran Church of Maquoketa.

== Iowa Senate ==
Bowman was first elected in 2010, defeating Republican Andrew Naeve. Bowman was the chair of the Senate Transportation Committee. He also served on the Agriculture, Education, Economic Growth and State Government committees, as well as the Transportation, Infrastructure, and Capitals Appropriations Budget Subcommittee (Vice Chair). He was defeated in the election of November 2018 by Republican opponent Carrie Koelker.
