= Jeff Kulmatycki =

Member-elect of the Iowa Senate from the 13th district
- Assuming office January 1, 2027
- Succeeding: Cherielynn Westrich

Personal details
- Party: Republican

Jeff Kulmatycki is an American politician who is Member-elect of the Iowa Senate from the 13th district.
