= Hollie Zajicek =

Member-elect of the Iowa Senate from the 11th district
- Assuming office January 1, 2027
- Succeeding: Julian Garrett

Personal details
- Party: Republican

Hollie Zajicek is an American politician who is Member-elect of the Iowa Senate from the 11th district.
