= Jackie Smith (politician) =

American politician

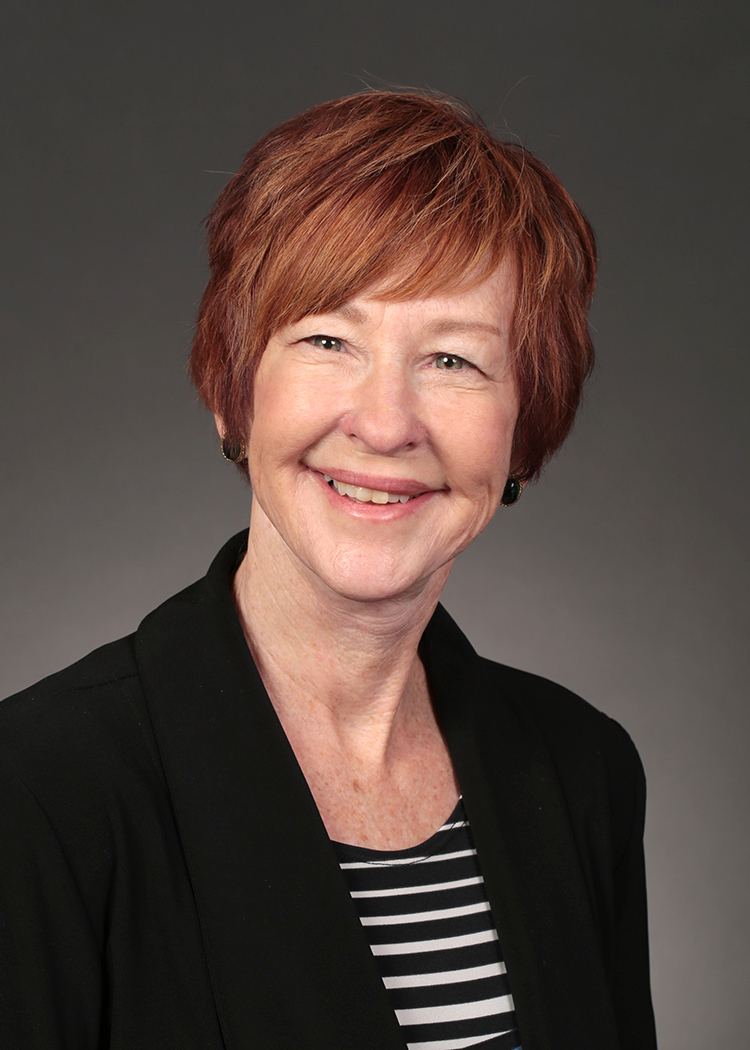

Member of the Iowa Senate from the 7th district
- In office January 14, 2019 – January 8, 2023
- Preceded by: Rick Bertrand
- Succeeded by: Kevin Alons

Personal details
- Born: 1955 (age 70–71) Sioux City, Iowa, U.S.
- Party: Democratic
- Spouse: Dennis
- Education: Briar Cliff University; Baylor University (MA)

Jaclyn 'Jackie' Smith (born 1955) is the Iowa State Senator from the 7th District. A Democrat, she has served in the Iowa Senate since being elected in 2018.

Smith and raised in Sioux City Iowa. She earned a bachelor's degree from Briar Cliff University and a master's degree from Baylor University in Waco, Texas. She went on to work for the Northwest AEA and spent 34 years working as a speech-language pathologist. During that time, she and her husband, Dennis owned and operated a clothing business.

In 2008 she was elected Woodbury County supervisor, serving eight years, before losing to Republican Keith Radig in 2016. In 2018 she sought the Democratic nomination for the Iowa Senate's seventh district seat. She won her party nomination and went on to defeat incumbent Rick Bertrand in the general election.

As of April 2020, Smith serves on the following committees: Local Government (Ranking Member), Education, Natural Resources and Environment, and Transportation. She also serves on the Economic Development Appropriations Subcommittee, School Finance Formula Review Committee, as well as the Economic Development Authority Board, and the Statewide Fire and Police Retirement System Board of Trustees.

In 2022, Smith was redistricted from District 7, where she was replaced by Kevin Alons, to District 1, where she lost reelection to Rocky De Witt.

== Electoral history ==
Iowa Senate 7th District election, 2018
Party	Candidate	Votes	%
Democratic	Jackie Smith	9,125	50.00%
Republican	Rick Bertrand	8,676	47.54%
Democratic gain from Republican			
