= Rocky De Witt =

American politician (1959–2025)

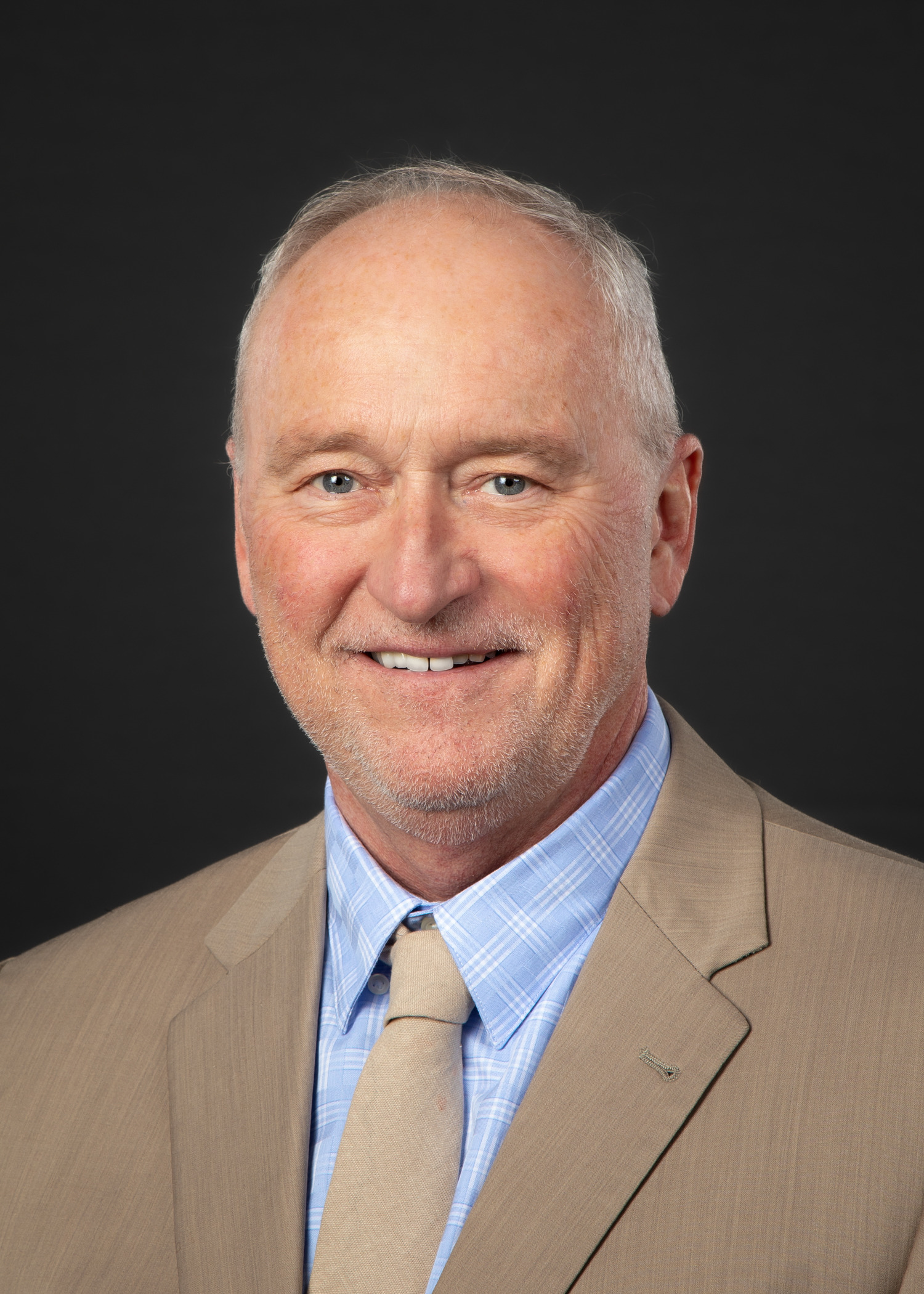
- Official portrait, 2023

Member of the Iowa Senate from the 1st district
- In office January 9, 2023 – June 25, 2025
- Preceded by: Dave Rowley
- Succeeded by: Catelin Drey

Personal details
- Born: April 12, 1959 Sioux City, Iowa, U.S.
- Died: June 25, 2025 (aged 66)
- Party: Republican

Rocky De Witt (April 12, 1959 – June 25, 2025) was an American politician who served in the 1st district of the Iowa Senate.

== Background ==
De Witt was born in Sioux City, Iowa on April 12, 1959, and was a resident of Lawton, with his wife Vicki. He had previously been married to Julie Katseres, with whom he raised three sons. De Witt worked for the MidAmerican Energy Company for 22 years. After leaving MidAmerican Energy, De Witt provided security for the Woodbury County Sheriff's Office.

De Witt died from pancreatic cancer on June 25, 2025, at the age of 66.

== Political career ==
De Witt was first elected to the District 5 seat on the Woodbury County Board of Supervisors in November 2016, and reelected in 2020. He served as board chairman in 2018 and 2021. In December 2021, De Witt began his campaign for the District 1 seat of the Iowa Senate. De Witt defeated incumbent Democratic legislator Jackie Smith, who was redistricted to District 1. After his death in office, a special election for De Witt's senate seat was scheduled for August 26, 2025. Democratic candidate Catelin Drey won the special election, beating Republican candidate Christopher Prosch by an 11-point margin.
