= Mike Zimmer (politician) =

American politician (born 1963/64)

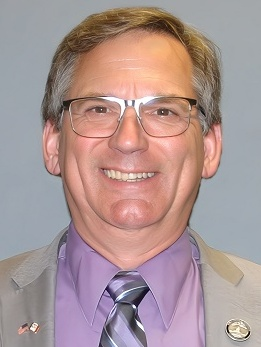
- Official portrait, 2025

Member of the Iowa Senate from the 35th district
- Incumbent
- Assumed office February 10, 2025
- Preceded by: Chris Cournoyer
- Succeeded by: Joe Stutting (elect)

Personal details
- Born: 1960 or 1961 (age 65–66)
- Party: Democratic
- Education: University of Northern Iowa (BA); University of Iowa (MA)

Mike Zimmer (born 1963/1964) is an education professional and politician who is currently the Iowa State Senator from the 35th district. A member of the Democratic Party, he defeated Republican Kate Whittington in a special election on January 28, 2025, to serve the remainder of Republican Chris Cournoyer's term.

== Early life and career ==
Zimmer graduated from the North Scott High School and the University of Northern Iowa. He taught, coached, and worked in administrative roles at various schools in eastern Iowa, including at the East Central Community School District, the Central DeWitt Community School District, and the Pleasant Valley High School.

== Political career ==
Zimmer has served as the president of the Central DeWitt Community School Board.

On December 16, 2024, Republican Chris Cournoyer resigned from representing the 35th district in the Iowa Senate to become lieutenant governor of Iowa, replacing Adam Gregg, who had resigned in September. Zimmer ran as a Democrat in the special election to fill the seat until the 2026 election. He defeated Republican candidate Katie Whittington by nearly four points in the general election, flipping the seat to the Democratic Party. Donald Trump won the district by 21 points in the 2024 presidential election. He was sworn into office on February 10, 2025.

He was unseated by Republican Joe Stutting in the 2026 election.

== Personal life ==
Zimmer is married and has five children.

== Electoral history ==
2025 Iowa's 35th Senate district special election
Party	Candidate	Votes	%
Democratic	Mike Zimmer	4,812	51.72%
Republican	Katie Elizabeth Whittington	4,473	48.08%
Write-in		19	0.20%
Total votes		9,304	100.0%
Democratic gain from Republican			
