= Janice Weiner =

American politician

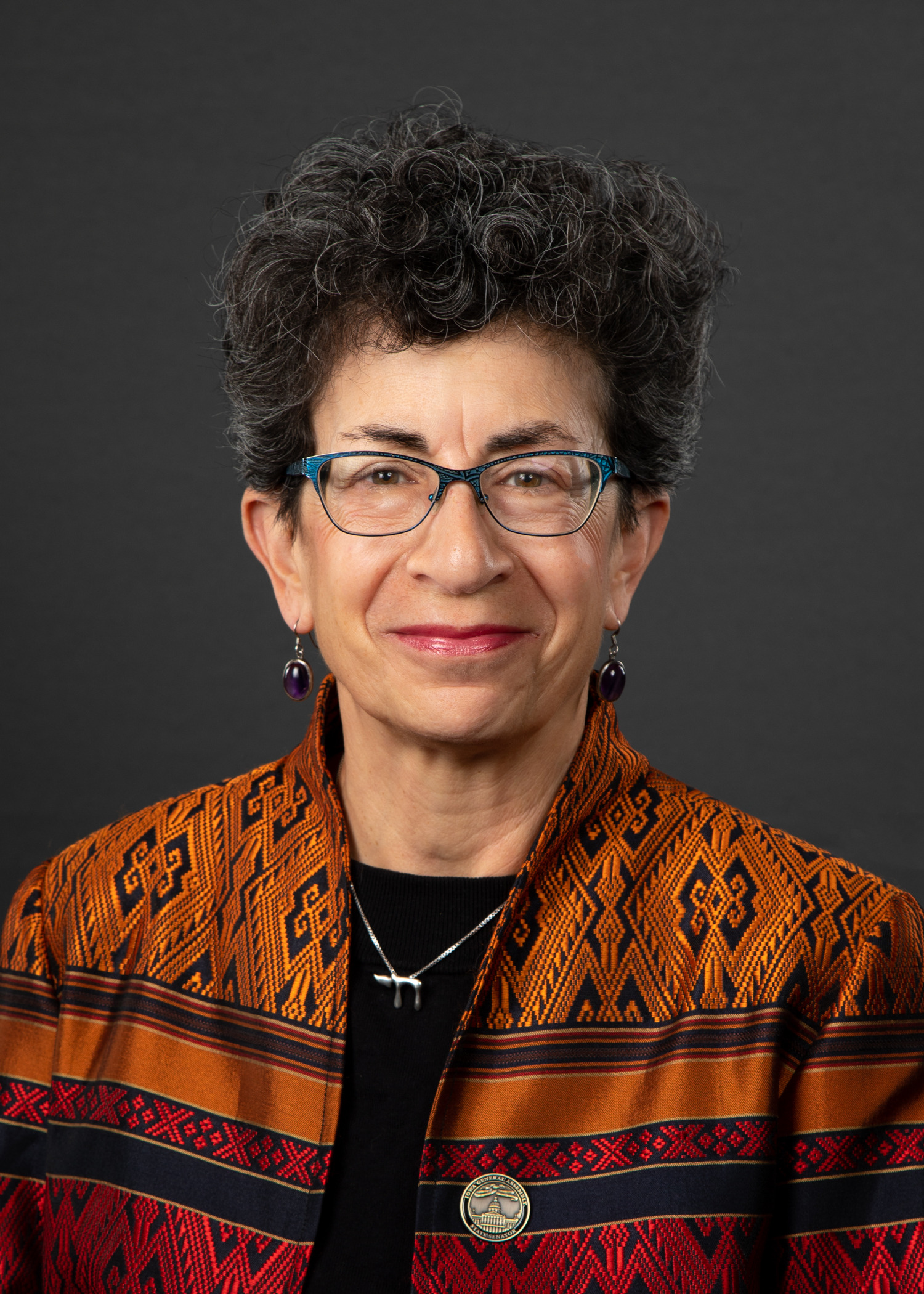

Minority Leader of the Iowa Senate
- Incumbent
- Assumed office January 8, 2025
- Preceded by: Pam Jochum

Member of the Iowa Senate from the 45th district
- Incumbent
- Assumed office January 9, 2023
- Preceded by: Jim Lykam

Personal details
- Born: 1957 (age 68–69) Iowa City, Iowa, U.S.
- Party: Democratic
- Children: 2
- Education: Princeton University (BA); Stanford University (JD)

Janice Weiner (born 1957) is an American politician and member of the Iowa Senate representing the 45th District.

== Early life and career ==
Weiner was born in 1957 in Iowa City, and raised in Coralville, Iowa. After graduating from Iowa City West High School, followed by Princeton University in 1980, and Stanford Law School in 1984, she worked for 26 years in the United States Foreign Service. Upon retirement, she returned to Coralville, working as a substitute teacher in 2015 and 2016. She is Jewish.

== Political career ==
Weiner first ran for public office in 2016, but did not win the Iowa City Community School Board seat vacated by Tom Yates. She then ran for an open seat in District 37 of the Iowa Senate in 2018, losing a Democratic Party primary to Zach Wahls. Weiner was elected to an at-large seat on the Iowa City city council in 2019. She began campaigning for the state senate seat in District 45 in November 2021. Due to redistricting, incumbent state senator Joe Bolkcom was eligible to represent this seat, but had previously announced his retirement. Weiner defeated John Raley in the Democratic Party primary in June 2022, and won the general election against Republican candidate Harold Weilbrenner. After winning the Iowa Senate election for District 45, Weiner resigned her seat on the Iowa City city council on 9 November 2022. After the resignation becomes effective on 31 December 2022, a successor will be appointed in January 2023.

On November 22, 2024, Weiner was elected Senate Minority Leader for the upcoming legislative session.

== Election history ==
2018 District 37 Primary Election
Party	Candidate	Votes	%	±%
Democratic	Zach Wahls	3,902	57.68%	
Democratic	Eric Dirth	189	2.80%	
Democratic	Imad Youssif	169	2.50%	
Democratic	Janice Weiner	2,281	33.72%	
	Write-ins, Under and Over Votes	223	3.30%	{{{change}}}
Turnout		6,764	100%	{{{change}}}

2022 Iowa 45th District Senate General Election Results
Party	Candidate	Votes	%	±%
Democratic	Janice Weiner	20,273	80.20%	
Democratic Party (United States)	Harold R. Weilbrenner	4,428	17.52%	
	Write-ins, Under and Over Votes	577	2.28%	
Turnout		25,278	100%	

Iowa Senate
Preceded by Pam Jochum	Minority Leader of the Iowa Senate; 2025–present	Incumbent
