= Catelin Drey =

American politician

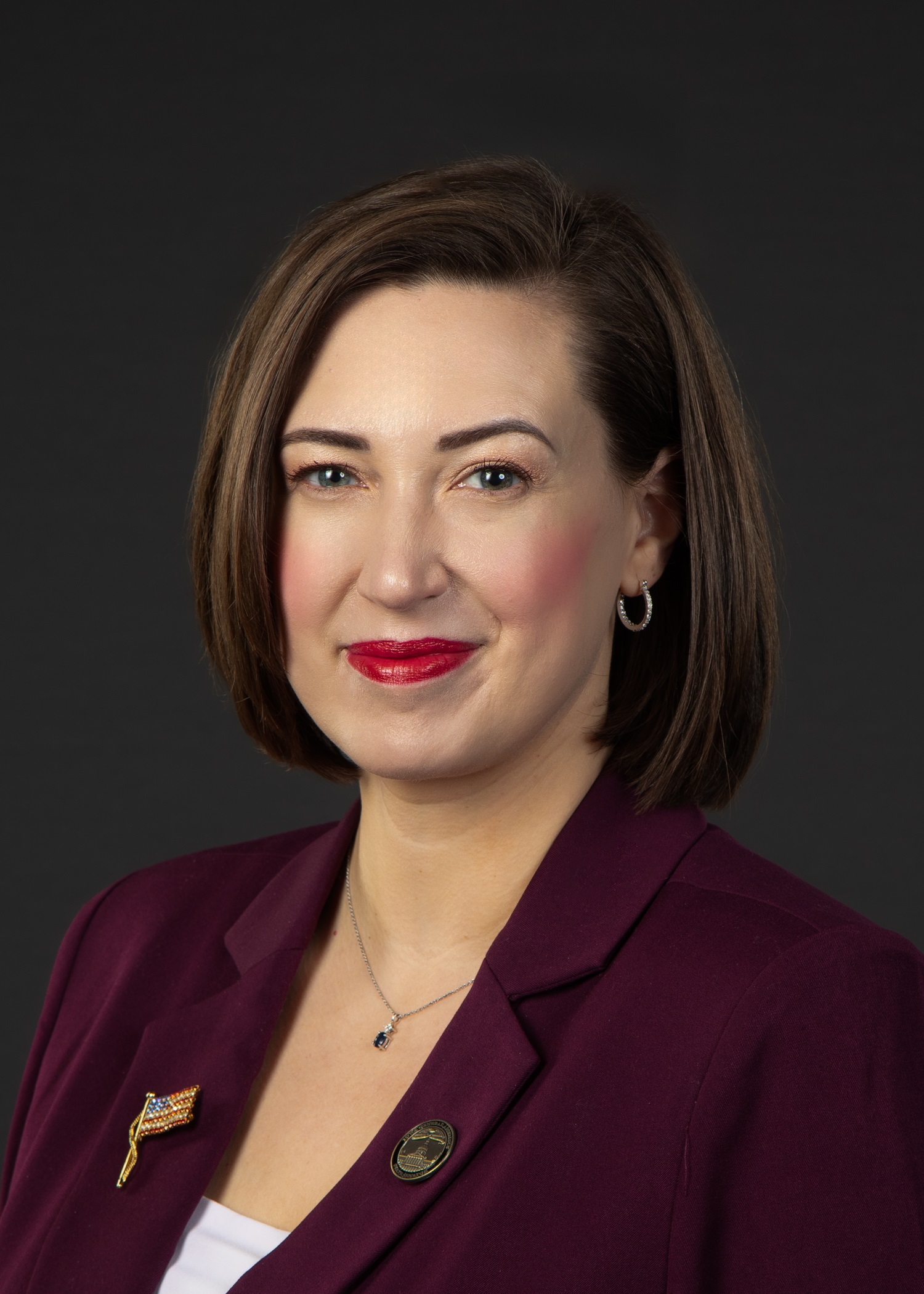
- Official portrait, 2026

Member of the Iowa Senate from the 1st district
- Incumbent
- Assumed office September 15, 2025
- Preceded by: Rocky De Witt

Personal details
- Born: 1987 or 1988 (age 38–39) North Dakota, U.S.
- Party: Democratic
- Children: 1
- Education: Morningside University (BA)

Catelin Drey (born 1987/1988) is an American politician. A member of the Democratic Party, she is a member of the Iowa Senate from the first district. She won a special election to the Iowa Senate in 2025.

== Early life and career ==
Drey is from North Dakota. She moved to Sioux City, Iowa, to attend Morningside University. Drey founded Moms for Iowa, a grassroots parent-led advocacy organization, and has been involved in various local organizations and charities, serving as a past president of the Siouxland Growth Organization.

== Political career ==
In June 2025, incumbent state senator Rocky De Witt died of cancer, and a special election was called for August 26 later that year. Drey announced a campaign focused on accessible childcare, funding public education, protecting bodily autonomy, and supporting economic equality. She faced Republican nominee Christopher Prosch, and won by a 10-point margin. She also received more financial support than Prosch, with $260,000 in total funds, including $165,000 in campaign contributions, compared to Prosch total of $181,000, including $20,000 via donors. Drey's victory in the special election ended the supermajority Iowa Senate Republicans had previously held. She also expressed interest in running for a full four-year term.

On September 15, 2025, she was sworn in by Iowa Supreme Court Justice Matthew McDermott.

== Personal life ==
Drey resides in Sioux City, Iowa, with her husband and their one child.

In January 2026, Drey announced that she had been diagnosed with uterine cancer. She underwent surgery and announced the following month that the cancer had been removed.

== Electoral history ==
=== 2025 ===
2025 Iowa's 1st District Senate Special Election
Party	Candidate	Votes	%	±%
Democratic	Catelin Drey	4,208	55.19%	+10.46%
Republican	Christopher A. Prosch	3,411	44.74%	−10.32%
	Scattering	5	0.07%	−0.14%
Majority		4,208	55.19%	
Turnout		7,624	100%	−54.51%
Democratic gain from Republican				
