= Dave Rowley =

American politician

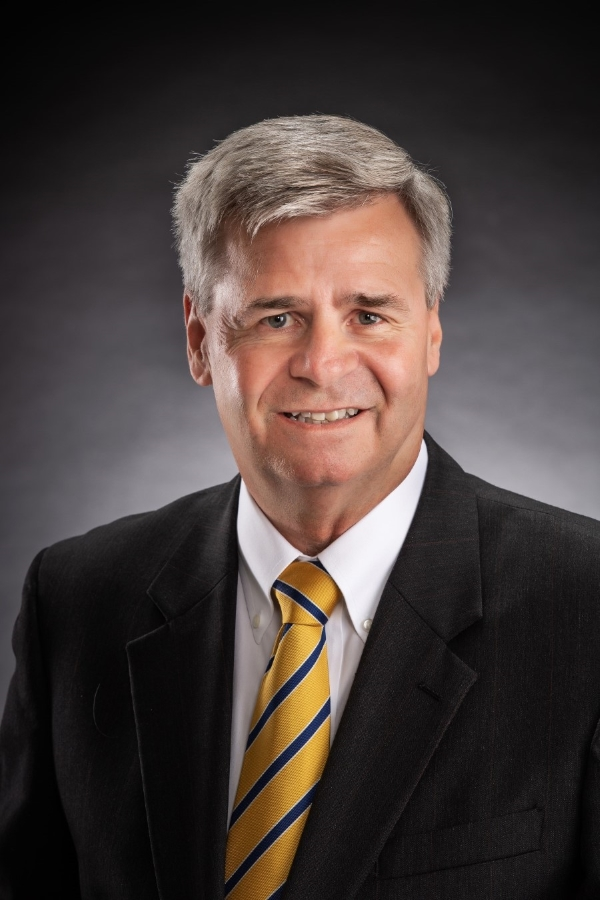

Member of the Iowa Senate from the 5th district
- Incumbent
- Assumed office January 9, 2023
- Preceded by: Tim Kraayenbrink

Member of the Iowa Senate from the 1st district
- In office January 10, 2022 – January 8, 2023
- Preceded by: Zach Whiting
- Succeeded by: Rocky De Witt

Personal details
- Party: Republican
- Spouse: Kris
- Children: 2

Dave Rowley is an insurance agent and politician serving in the Iowa Senate since 2021, currently representing the 5th district. He is a member of the Republican Party.

== Political career ==
Following Republican Zach Whiting's resignation from the Iowa Senate, Rowley ran in the special election to fill the remainder of his term in the 1st district. He defeated Democrat Mark Lemke in the December 14, 2021, special election.

Rowley was redistricted to the 5th district for the 2022 election. He defeated fellow Republican David D. Dow in the primary election, and was reelected against only write-in general election opposition.

== Personal life ==
Rowley lives in Spirit Lake with his wife Kris. He has two children and four grandchildren. He is also a musician.

Rowley was diagnosed with tonsil cancer in early 2026. He plans to continue working and seeking re-election while he undergoes treatment.

== Electoral history ==
2021 Iowa Senate 1st district special election
| Party | Candidate | Votes | % |
|---|---|---|---|
| Republican | Dave Rowley | 2,690 | 75.58% |
| Democratic | Mark Lemke | 864 | 24.28% |
| Write-in | | 5 | 0.14% |
| Total votes | | 3,559 | 100% |
| Republican hold | | | |

2022 Iowa's 5th Senate district Republican primary election
| Party | Candidate | Votes | % |
|---|---|---|---|
| Republican | Dave Rowley (incumbent) (Note: Redistricted from district 1 to 5.) | 3,405 | 67.60% |
| Republican | David D. Dow | 1,632 | 32.40% |
| Total votes | | 5,037 | 100.00% |

2022 Iowa's 5th Senate district election
| Party | Candidate | Votes | % |
|---|---|---|---|
| Republican | Dave Rowley (incumbent) | 22,597 | 98.54% |
| Write-in | | 335 | 1.46% |
| Total votes | | 22,932 | 100.00% |
| Republican hold | | | |
