= Tony Bisignano =

American politician

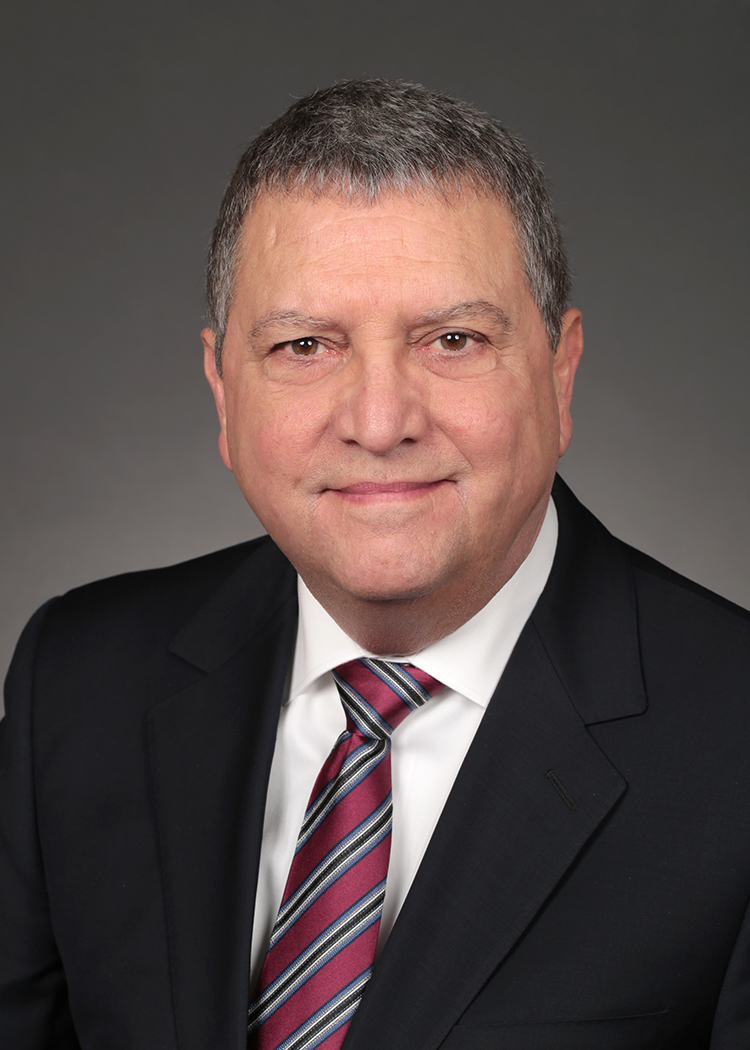
- Official portrait, 2015

Member of the Iowa Senate
- Incumbent
- Assumed office January 12, 2015
- Preceded by: Jack Hatch
- Constituency: 17th district (2015–2023); 15th district (2023–present)
- In office January 11, 1993 – January 12, 1997
- Preceded by: John Peterson
- Succeeded by: Matt McCoy
- Constituency: 34th district

Member of the Iowa House of Representatives from the 80th district
- In office January 12, 1987 – January 11, 1993
- Preceded by: Jack E. Woods
- Succeeded by: Michael K. Peterson

Personal details
- Born: May 14, 1952 (age 74) Des Moines, Iowa, U.S.
- Party: Democratic
- Spouse: Kimberly Caudill (m. 1974)
- Children: 3 (1 deceased)
- Education: University of Northern Iowa; Drake University
- Occupation: Civil servant; union official; politician

Anthony Bisignano (born May 14, 1952) is an American politician, currently serving as a member of the Iowa Senate.

A member of the Democratic Party, Bisignano first served in the state senate from 1993 to 1997, after serving from 1987 to 1993 in the Iowa House of Representatives. He returned to the senate following the state's 2014 elections.

== Biography ==
Tony Bisignano was born in Des Moines, Iowa to Alfonso and Rose Bisignano.

He graduated from Dowling Catholic High School in 1970. Bisignano then attended the University of Northern Iowa and Grandview College. Bisignano attended Drake University in Des Moines.

Bisignano served worked in various jobs for Polk County, Iowa and was president of AFSCME Local 1868, eventually becoming a project manager for the Polk County Board of Supervisors. He is a member of the Italian/American Cultural Center and is a past board member of Big Brothers and Big Sisters of Greater Des Moines.

== Iowa House ==
Bisignano served in the Iowa House representing the 80th district from 1987 until 1993 when he was elected to the Senate.

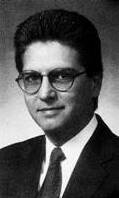
Bisignano in the 76th General Assembly

== Iowa Senate ==
Bisignano served in the Iowa Senate representing the 34th district from 1993 until 1997.

Bisignano ran for the Iowa Senate again in 2014 and was elected to represent the 17th district. He serves as the chairman of the Labor and Business Relations Committee.

== Personal life ==
Bisignano has been married to Kimberly Caudill since 1974. They have two daughters, Emily and Allison. Their son, Nick, was killed in an auto accident.

Bisignano is a Roman Catholic and worships at St. Anthony's Catholic Church.
