= Adrian Dickey =

American politician

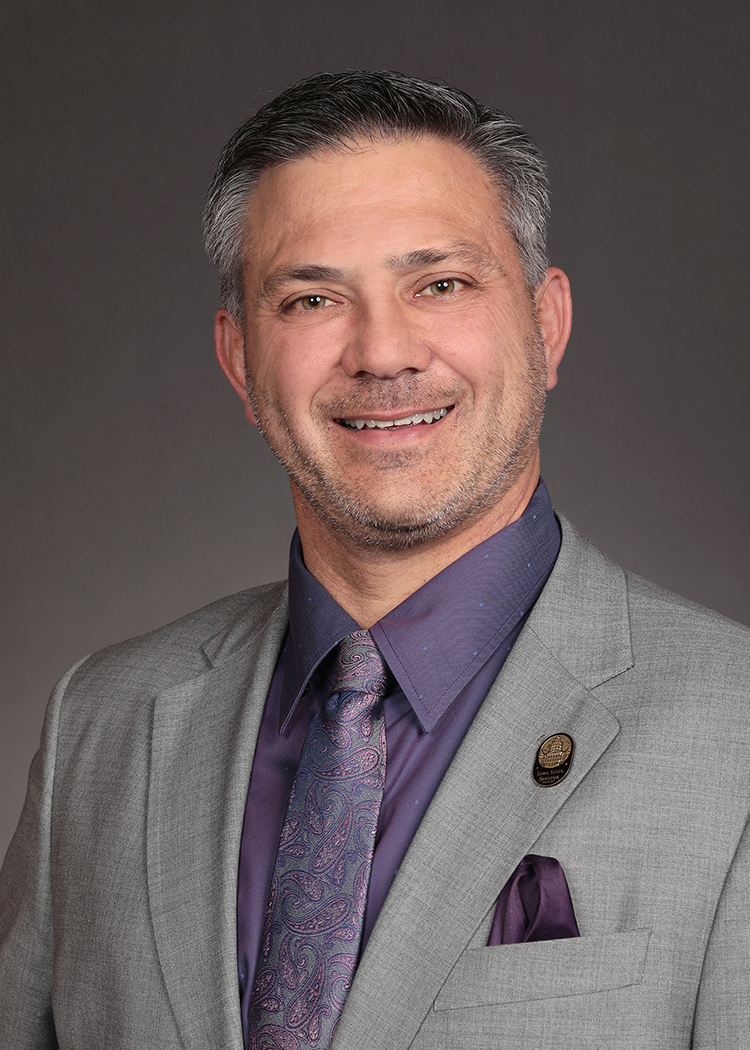

Member of the Iowa Senate from the 44th district
- Incumbent
- Assumed office January 9, 2023
- Preceded by: Mariannette Miller-Meeks
- Constituency: District 44 - (2023-Present); District 41 - (2021-2023)

Personal details
- Born: Adrian Jeremy Dickey; October 23, 1973 (age 53) Packwood, Iowa, U.S.
- Party: Republican
- Education: University of Northern Iowa (BT)
- Occupation: Dickey Transport, president

Adrian Jeremy Dickey (born October 23, 1973) is an American politician and a senator for the state of Iowa for District 44.

== Personal life ==
Dickey, the son of former Packwood Mayor Dave Dickey, was born in Packwood, Iowa in 1973. He resides there with his family.

Dickey graduated from the University of Northern Iowa with a Bachelor of Technology degree in Manufacturing Technology with an emphasis on Computer-aided Drafting and Design in 1995.

In 2022, a TikTok user published videos saying she had cut ties with her father, a "Republican state senator", for advocating the Iowa Supreme Court to overturn abortion rights in the Planned Parenthood v. Reynolds (2022) decision, and for voting to pass House File 2416, which banned trans women and girls from female sports. According to the poster, she is Adrian Dickey's daughter, Korynn.

In 2023, Dickey was arrested and charged with a misdemeanor during Iowa's RAGBRAI bike race. He was charged with interference with official acts for allegedly obstructing the bike race and refusing to move when directed by the Sac County Sheriff. Charges were later dismissed.

== Political career ==
With Dave Loebsack's retirement, Mariannette Miller-Meeks resigned from her Iowa Senate, District 41 seat to fill the vacancy for Iowa's 2nd congressional district. A special election was called for by Iowa governor Kim Reynolds to fill the vacancy left by Miller-Meeks. Republican Packwood native Adrian Dickey defeated Democratic challenger Mary Stewart to win the vacant Iowa senate seat in January 2021.

== Electoral history ==
=== 2021 ===
Iowa's 41st senate district special election
Party	Candidate	Votes	%
Republican	Adrian Dickey	5,091	55.03
Democratic	Mary Stewart	4,111	44.07
Write-ins			
Total votes		9,202	100
Republican hold			

=== 2022 ===
2022 Iowa's 44th senate district primary elections
Party	Candidate	Votes	%
Republican	Adrian Dickey	5,362	99.63
Write-ins		20	0.37
Total votes		5,382	100

2022 Iowa's 44th senate district general election
Party	Candidate	Votes	%
Republican	Adrian Dickey	15,318	66.49
Democratic	Rich Taylor	7,699	33.42
Write-ins		22	0.10
Total votes		23,039	100
Republican hold			

=== 2024 ===
Republican Primary, 44th District
Party	Candidate	Votes	%
Republican	Adrian Dickey (incumbent)	3,503	98.32
Republican	Write-in	60	1.68
Total votes		3,563	100.00

2024 Iowa Senate election, 44th District
Party	Candidate	Votes	%
Republican	Adrian Dickey (Incumbent)	19,207	68.32
Independent	Lisa Ossian	8,826	31.39
Write-in		81	0.29
Total votes		28,114	100.0
Republican hold			

Iowa Senate
Preceded by Tim Goodwin	44th district 2023–2027	Succeeded by Incumbent
Preceded by Mariannette Miller-Meeks	41st district 2021–2023	Succeeded by Kerry Gruenhagen
