= Iowa's 35th Senate district =

American legislative district

Senate District 35
- Type: District of the Upper House
- Location: Eastern Iowa
- Senator: Mike Zimmer (D)
- Parent organization: Iowa General Assembly

The 35th District of the Iowa Senate is located in eastern Iowa, and is currently composed of Clinton County, as well as part of Jackson and Scott counties.

== Current elected officials ==
Mike Zimmer is the senator currently representing the 35th District.

The area of the 35th District contains two Iowa House of Representatives districts:

- The 69th District (represented by Tom Determann)
- The 70th District (represented by Tracy Ehlert)

The district is also located in Iowa's 1st congressional district, which is represented by Mariannette Miller-Meeks.

== Past senators ==
The district has previously been represented by:

- C. Joseph Coleman, 1967–1971
- William Dieleman, 1983–1992
- Florence Buhr, 1993–1994
- Dick Dearden, 1995–2002
- Jeff Lamberti, 2003–2006
- Larry Noble, 2007–2010
- Jack Whitver, 2011–2012
- Wally Horn, 2013–2018
- Todd Taylor, 2019–2023
- Chris Cournoyer, 2023–2024
- Mike Zimmer, 2025–2027
- Joe Stutting, 2027–present

== Recent election results from statewide races ==
Year	Office	Results
2008	President	Obama 59–39%
2012	President	Obama 59–41%
2016	President	Trump 51–42%
2016	Senate	Grassley 58–37%
2018	Governor	Reynolds 50–48%
2018	Attorney General	Miller 74–26%
2018	Secretary of State	Pate 52–45%
2018	Treasurer	Fitzgerald 52–45%
2018	Auditor	Sand 52–46%
2020	President	Trump 56–42%
2020	Senate	Ernst 53–43%
2022	Senate	Grassley 58–42%
2022	Governor	Reynolds 61–36%
2022	Attorney General	Bird 56–44%
2022	Secretary of State	Pate 61–39%
2022	Treasurer	Smith 56–44%
2022	Auditor	Halbur 56–44%
2024	President	Trump 60–39%

== See also ==
- Iowa General Assembly
- Iowa Senate
