= Iowa's 29th Senate district =

American legislative district

Senate District 29
- Type: District of the Upper House
- Location: Eastern Iowa
- Senator: Sandy Salmon (R)
- Parent organization: Iowa General Assembly

The 29th District of the Iowa Senate is located in eastern Iowa, and is currently composed of Chickasaw, Butler, and Bremer counties, as well as part of Floyd County.

== Current elected officials ==
Carrie Koelker is the senator currently representing the 29th District.

The area of the 29th District contains two Iowa House of Representatives districts:

- The 57th District (represented by Shannon Lundgren)
- The 58th District (represented by Steve Bradley)

The district is also located in Iowa's 1st congressional district, which is represented by Ashley Hinson.

== Past senators ==
The district has previously been represented by:

- Perry Engle, 1892–1894
- Jack Rife, 1983–1992
- William Dieleman, 1993–1994
- Dennis Black, 1995–2002
- Nancy Boettger, 2003–2012
- Tod Bowman, 2013–2018
- Carrie Koelker, 2019–2023
- Sandy Salmon, 2023–present

== Recent election results from statewide races ==
Year	Office	Results
2008	President	Obama 54–43%
2012	President	Obama 52–48%
2016	President	Trump 57–36%
2016	Senate	Grassley 66–31%
2018	Governor	Reynolds 57–41%
2018	Attorney General	Miller 75–25%
2018	Secretary of State	Pate 60–38%
2018	Treasurer	Fitzgerald 51–47%
2018	Auditor	Mosiman 50–47%
2020	President	Trump 61–37%
2020	Senate	Ernst 59–38%
2022	Senate	Grassley 64–36%
2022	Governor	Reynolds 67–30%
2022	Attorney General	Bird 57–43%
2022	Secretary of State	Pate 70–30%
2022	Treasurer	Smith 58–42%
2022	Auditor	Halbur 55–45%
2024	President	Trump 64–34%

== See also ==
- Iowa General Assembly
- Iowa Senate
