= Sandy Salmon =

American politician

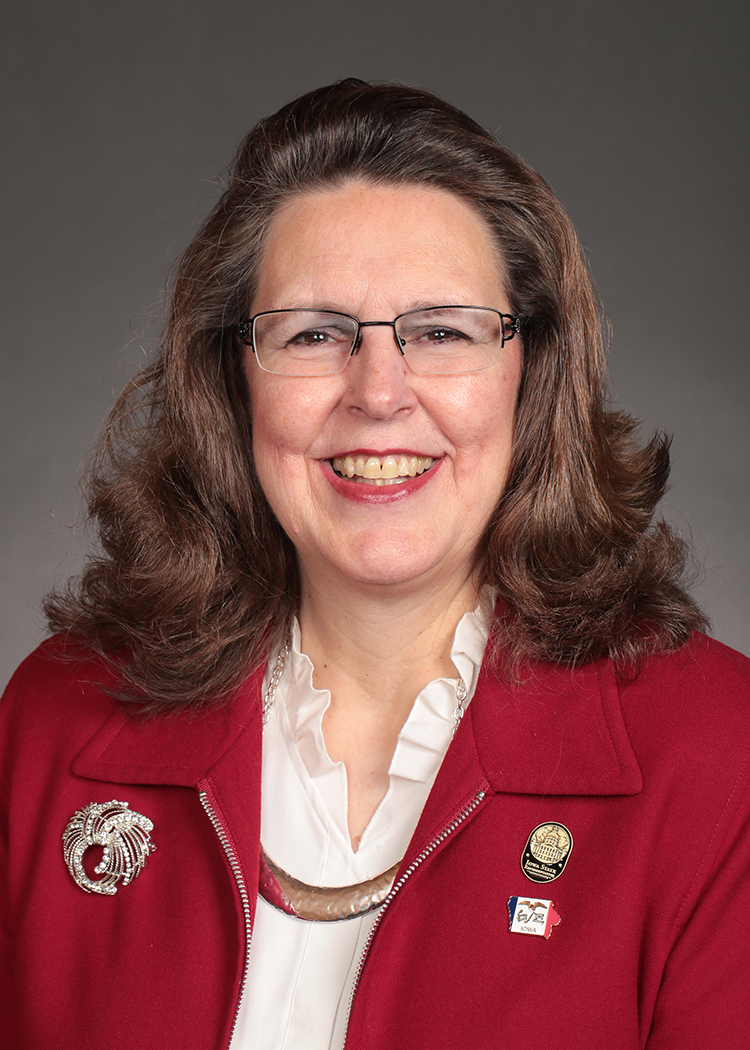
- Iowa State Representative Sandy Salmon

Member of the Iowa Senate from the 29 district
- Incumbent
- Assumed office January 9, 2023
- Preceded by: Carrie Koelker
- Constituency: District 29 - (2023-Present)

Member of the Iowa House of Representatives from the 63 district
- In office January 14, 2013 – January 8, 2023
- Preceded by: Scott Raecker
- Succeeded by: Michael Bergan

Personal details
- Born: October 23, 1955 (age 71) Lawton, Oklahoma, U.S.
- Party: Republican
- Spouse: Matt Salmon
- Children: 3
- Education: University of Northern Iowa (BA)
- Occupation: Farm management, politician
- Website: https://www.sandysalmon.org/
- Military career
- Allegiance: United States
- Branch: United States Marine Corps
- Service years: 1977-1980

Sandy Salmon is an American politician, military veteran, and farm manager. Salmon is a Republican member of the Iowa Senate from District 29 and previously served on the Iowa House of Representatives as the Representative from District 63 from 2013 to 2023.

== Early life ==
On October 23, 1955, Salmon was born in Oklahoma. Salmon's father was Dwight Puttmann, who served in the U.S. military and stationed at Army base in Fort Sill in Lawton, Oklahoma. Salmon's mother was Sally Puttmann. Salmon has a sister. They have a family farm in northwest Iowa. In 1973, Salmon graduated from Kingsley-Pierson High School.

== Education ==
In 1977, Salmon earned a bachelor's degree in Business Management from University of Northern Iowa.

== Career ==
In 1977, Salmon served in the United States Marine Corps, until 1980.

As a home educator, Salmon provided K-12 education to her children.

In 2011, Salmon became a legislative clerk in the Iowa State Senate.

On November 6, 2012, Salmon's political career began when she won the election and became a member of the Iowa House of Representatives for District 63. Salmon defeated Bill Heckroth with 50.3% of the votes. On November 4, 2014, as an incumbent, Salmon won the election and continued serving as a member of Iowa House of Representatives for District 63. Salmon defeated Teresa Meyer with 58.1% of the votes. On November 8, 2016, as an incumbent, Salmon won the election and continued serving District 63. Salmon defeated Teresa Meyer again. On November 6, 2018, as an incumbent, Salmon won the election and continued serving District 63. Salmon defeated Eric Stromberg.

On May 7, 2025, Salmon introduced Senate Concurrent Resolution 3 which asked the Supreme Court to overturn Obergefell v. Hodges, arguing for a restoration of the "natural" definition of marriage, despite broad public support for same-sex marriage in Iowa.

Salmon serves as the chairperson of the Veterans Affairs Committee. Salmon also serves as a member of Education Committee, Human Resources Committee, and Public Safety Committee.

Salmon manages a farm with her sister.

== Electoral history ==
*incumbent

Election	Political result	Candidate	Party	Votes	%
Iowa House of Representatives primary elections, 2012; District 63	Republican	Sandy Salmon	Republican	unopposed	
Iowa General House of Representatives elections, 2012; District 63; Turnout: 17,053	Republican (newly redistricted)	Sandy Salmon	Republican	8,298	48.66%
Iowa General House of Representatives elections, 2012; District 63; Turnout: 17,053	Republican (newly redistricted)	Bill Heckroth	Democratic	8,183	47.99%

== Personal life ==
Salmon's husband is Matt Salmon, a helicopter pilot and a retired Army National Guard. They have three children. They received their home-schooled education K-12. Salmon and her family live in Janesville, Iowa.

Iowa Senate
Preceded by Carrie Koelker	29th District; 2023 – present	Succeeded by Incumbent
Iowa House of Representatives
Preceded by Chris Hall	63rd District; 2013 – 2023	Succeeded by Michael Bergan
