= Iowa's 41st Senate district =

American legislative district

Senate District 41
- Type: District of the Upper House
- Location: Southeastern Iowa
- Senator: Kerry Gruenhagen (R)
- Parent organization: Iowa General Assembly

The 41st District of the Iowa Senate is located in eastern Iowa, and is currently composed of Cedar County, as well as parts of Muscatine and Scott Counties.

== Current elected officials ==
Kerry Gruenhagen is the senator currently representing the 41st District.

The area of the 41st District contains two Iowa House of Representatives districts:

- The 81st District (represented by Cherielynn Westrich)
- The 82nd District (represented by Jeff Shipley)

The district is also located in Iowa's 2nd congressional district, which is represented by Mariannette Miller-Meeks.

== Past senators ==
The district has previously been represented by:

- Hilarius Louis Heying, 1965–1966
- Vernon H. Kyhl, 1967–1970
- Earl G. Bass, 1971–1972
- William E. Gluba, 1973–1976
- Forrest Ashcraft, 1977–1978
- Patrick J. Deluhery, 1979–1982
- Julia Gentleman, 1983–1990
- Mary Kramer, 1991–1992
- Jack Hester, 1993–1994
- Nancy Boettger, 1995–2002
- Maggie Tinsman, 2003–2006
- David Hartsuch, 2007–2010
- Roby Smith, 2011–2012
- Mark Chelgren, 2013–2018
- Mariannette Miller-Meeks, 2019–2021
- Adrian Dickey, 2021–2023
- Kerry Gruenhagen, 2023-present

== Recent election results from statewide races ==
Year	Office	Results
2008	President	Obama 56–42%
2012	President	Obama 57–43%
2016	President	Trump 49–44%
2016	Senate	Grassley 58–38%
2018	Governor	Reynolds 49.4–48.5%
2018	Attorney General	Miller 75–25%
2018	Secretary of State	Pate 51–47%
2018	Treasurer	Fitzgerald 55–43%
2018	Auditor	Sand 53–44%
2020	President	Trump 51–47%
2020	Senate	Ernst 50–47%
2022	Senate	Grassley 55–44%
2022	Governor	Reynolds 58–39%
2022	Attorney General	Bird 53–47%
2022	Secretary of State	Pate 59–41%
2022	Treasurer	Smith 54–46%
2022	Auditor	Halbur 52–48%
2024	President	Trump 55–44%

== See also ==
- Iowa General Assembly
- Iowa Senate
