= Kerry Gruenhagen =

American politician

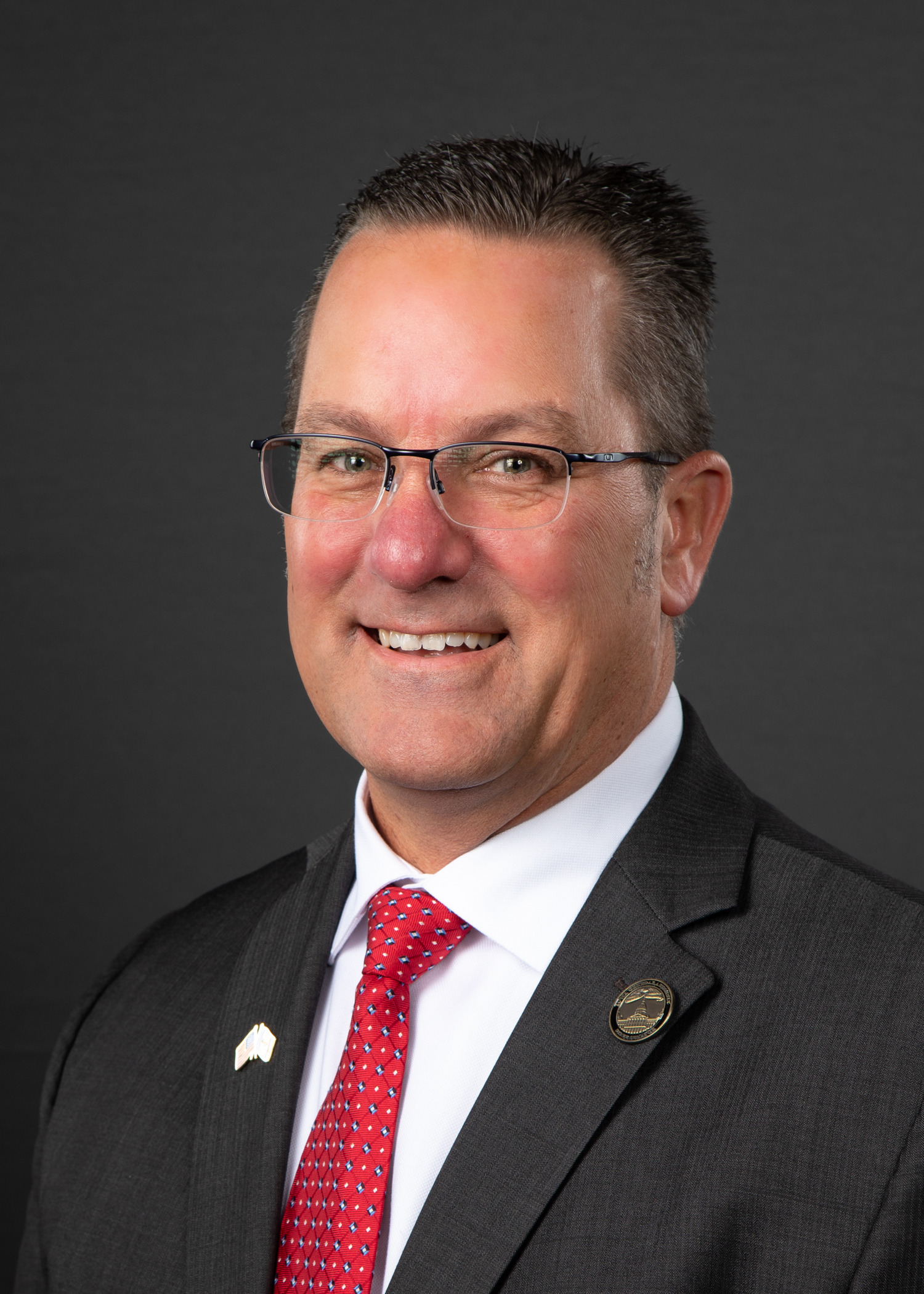

Member of the Iowa Senate from the 41st district
- Incumbent
- Assumed office 9 January 2023
- Preceded by: Adrian Dickey

Personal details
- Born: 1969 (age 56–57) Davenport, Iowa
- Party: Republican
- Profession: Farmer and small business owner

Kerry Gruenhagen (born c. 1970) is an American farmer and politician.

== Early life and career ==
Gruenhagen is a resident of Walcott, Iowa, and became a member of the Muscatine County branch of the Farm Bureau in 1994.

== Political career ==
Gruenhagen announced his intention to run for District 41 of the Iowa Senate in December 2021. The seat was open following redistricting, as Jim Lykam retired and Roby Smith opted to run for state treasurer. Gruenhagen defeated Alan Weets in the Republican Party primary election, held in June 2022. Gruenhagen won the November 2022 general election against Democratic candidate Deb VanderGaast.

Iowa Senate
Preceded by Adrian Dickey	41st District; 2023 – present	Succeeded by Incumbent
