= Carrie Koelker =

American politician

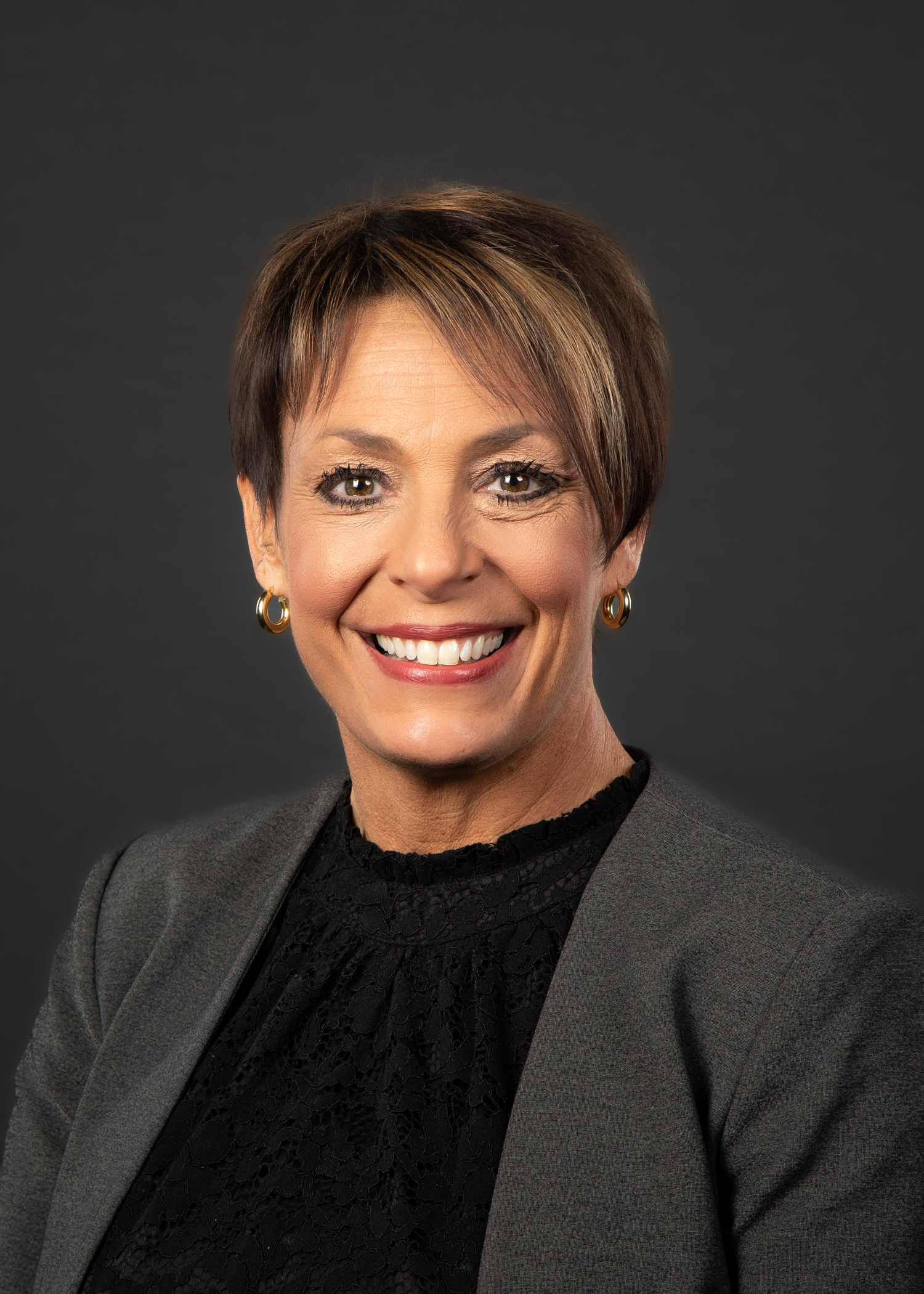

Member of the Iowa Senate from the 33rd district
- Incumbent
- Assumed office January 14, 2019
- Preceded by: Tod Bowman
- Constituency: District 33 - (2023-Present)/ District 29 - (2019-2023)

Personal details
- Born: 1970 (age 55–56) Stanton, Iowa, U.S.
- Party: Republican
- Children: 4

Carrie Koelker is the Iowa State Senator from the 33rd District. A Republican, she has served in the Iowa Senate since 2019. She currently resides in Dyersville, Iowa.

As of February 2020, Koelker serves on the following committees: Commerce (Vice Chair), Appropriations, Labor and Business Relations, Transportation, and Veterans Affairs. She also serves on the Education Appropriations Subcommittee, as well as the Enhance Iowa Board, the Iowa Finance Authority, and the Midwestern Higher Education Compact.

== Electoral history ==
Iowa Senate 29th District election, 2018
Party	Candidate	Votes	%
Republican	Carrie Koelker	15,493	53.5%
Democratic	Tod Bowman	13,437	46.4%
Republican gain from Democratic			

== Notes ==
Iowa Senate
Preceded by Rob Hogg	33rd District; 2023 – present	Succeeded by Incumbent
Preceded by Tod Bowman	29th District; 2019 – 2023	Succeeded by Sandy Salmon
