= Iowa's 1st Senate district =

American legislative district

Iowa's 1st State Senate district
Senator
Catelin Drey; D–Sioux City

The 1st district of the Iowa Senate, located in Northwestern Iowa, is currently composed of part of Woodbury County. It is represented by Catelin Drey, who won an August 2025 special election to succeed Republican Rocky De Witt. On September 15, 2025, she was sworn in by Iowa Supreme Court Justice Matthew McDermott.

== List of representatives ==
Representative	Party	Dates	Residence	Notes
Jacob Huner	Democratic	1846–1848	Fort Madison	
James Sprott	Whig	1846–1850	Summittville	
Thomas Stevenson Espy	Democratic	1848–1852	Fort Madison	
Nathan Baker	Democratic	1850–1852	West Point	
James M. Love	Democratic	1852–1855	Keokuk	
Calvin J. Price	Democratic	1852–1854		
David Trowbridge Brigham	Democratic	1854–1856		
Salmon Cowles	Democratic	1852–1854	Fort Madison	
Exum S. McCulloch	Democratic	1854–1858	Harrison Township	
William A. Thurston	Democratic	1854–1858	Fort Madison	
John R. Allen	Democratic	1858–1860		
John Walker Rankin	Republican	1858–1862	Keokuk	
Valentine Buechel	Democratic	1860–1862	Fort Madison	
Frederick Hesser	Democratic	1862–1866	Fort Madison	
George Washington McCrary	Republican	1862–1866	Keokuk	
Nathaniel Gates Hedges	Democratic	1866–1870		
Joseph Hollman	Democratic	1866–1870		
Exum S. McCulloch	Democratic	1870–1874	Harrison Township	
Henry Rothert	Republican	1874–1878	Keokuk	
James Shelley	Democratic	1878–1882	Keokuk	
Henry Rothert	Republican	1882–1886	Keokuk	
Josephy M. Casey	Democratic	1886–1888	Fort Madison	
William Kent	Democratic	1888–1894	Fort Madison	
John Downey	Democratic	1894–1898	Lee County	
David Young	Democratic	1898–1907	Keokuk	
E. P. McManus	Democratic	1907–1915	Keokuk	
Joseph R. Frailey	Republican	1915–1923	Fort Madison	
Isaac Snook	Democratic	1923–1927	West Point	
Joseph R. Frailey	Republican	1927–1935	Fort Madison	
Timothy Driscoll	Democratic	1935–1937	Belfast	
Stanley Hart	Republican	1937–1955	Keokuk	
Edward McManus	Democratic	1955–1959	Keokuk	
Charles Eppers	Democratic	1959–1963	Keokuk	
Seeley Lodwick	Republican	1963–1969	Wever	
Wilson Davis	Republican	1969–1971	Keokuk	
Lucas DeKoster	Republican	1971–1983	Hull	
Milo Colton	Democratic	1983–1987	Sioux City	
Al Sturgeon	Democratic	1987–1995	Sioux City	
Steven Hansen	Democratic	1995–2003	Sioux City	
Steven Warnstadt	Democratic	2003–2011	Sioux City	
Rick Bertrand	Republican	2011–2013	Sioux City	
David Johnson	Republican	2013–2015	Ocheyedan	
David Johnson	Independent	2015–2019	Ocheyedan	
Zach Whiting	Republican	2019–2021	Spirit Lake	
Dave Rowley	Republican	2021–2023	Spirit Lake	
Rocky De Witt	Republican	2023–2025	Lawton	
Catelin Drey	Democratic	2025–present	Sioux City	

== Election results ==
=== 2018 ===
Iowa Senate, District 1 Republican primary, 2018
Party	Candidate	Votes	%
Republican	Zach Whiting	3,539	62.4
Republican	Brad D. Price	1,288	22.7
Republican	Jesse Wolfe	844	14.9
Total votes		5,671	100.0

Iowa Senate, District 1 general election, 2018
Party	Candidate	Votes	%
Republican	Zach Whiting	21,245	100.0
Total votes		21,245	100.0
Republican gain from Independent			

== Recent election results from statewide races ==
Year	Office	Results
2008	President	Obama 54–44%
2012	President	Obama 57–43%
2016	President	Trump 50–44%
2016	Senate	Grassley 57–38%
2018	Governor	Reynolds 50–48%
2018	Attorney General	Miller 76–24%
2018	Secretary of State	DeJear 49.0–48.6%
2018	Treasurer	Fitzgerald 55–43%
2018	Auditor	Sand 56–41%
2020	President	Trump 50–48%
2020	Senate	Greenfield 48.4–47.6%
2022	Senate	Grassley 57–42%
2022	Governor	Reynolds 60–37%
2022	Attorney General	Bird 52–48%
2022	Secretary of State	Pate 59–41%
2022	Treasurer	Smith 54–46%
2022	Auditor	Halbur 51–49%
2024	President	Trump 55–43%

== Historical district boundaries ==
Map	Description	Years effective	Notes
	Lee County	1846–1857	From 1846 to 1857, district numbering was not utilized by the Iowa State Legislature. This convention was added with the passing of the 1857 Iowa Constitution. Numbering of districts pre-1857 is done as a matter of historic convenience.
	Lee County	1858–1970	
	Plymouth County Sioux County Lyon County (part)	1971–1972	In 1970, the Iowa Legislature passed an amendment to the Iowa Constitution setting forth the rules for legislative redistricting in order to abide by the rules established by the Reynolds v. Sims Supreme Court case. The first reapportionment map created by the Republican controlled legislature was deemed unconstitutional, but was still used for the 1970 election.
	Plymouth County (part) Sioux County (part) Lyon County (part)	1973–1982	
	Woodbury County (part)	1983–1992	
	Woodbury County (part)	1993–2002	
	Woodbury County (part): Sioux City (North Half)	2003–2012	
	Lyon County Osceola County Dickinson County Clay County Palo Alto County	2013–2022	
	Woodbury County (part): Sioux City (North Half); Concord Township; Banner Township; Lawton	2023–present	

== See also ==
- Iowa General Assembly
- Iowa Senate
