= Iowa Senate =

Upper house of the Iowa General Assembly

Coordinates: 41.591°N 93.604°W

- Iowa General Assembly

Type
- Type: Upper house
- Term limits: None

History
- New session started: January 13, 2023

Leadership
- President: Amy Sinclair (R) since January 4, 2023
- President pro tempore: Ken Rozenboom (R) since January 8, 2025
- Majority Leader: Mike Klimesh (R) since September 24, 2025
- Minority Leader: Janice Weiner (D) since January 8, 2025

Structure
- Seats: 50
- Political groups: Majority: Republican (33); Minority: Democratic (17)
- Length of term: 4 years
- Authority: Legislative Department, Section 3, Iowa Constitution
- Salary: $25,000/year + per diem

Elections
- Last election: November 5, 2024 (25 seats)
- Next election: November 3, 2026 (25 seats)
- Redistricting: Legislative Service Agency with legislative approval

Meeting place
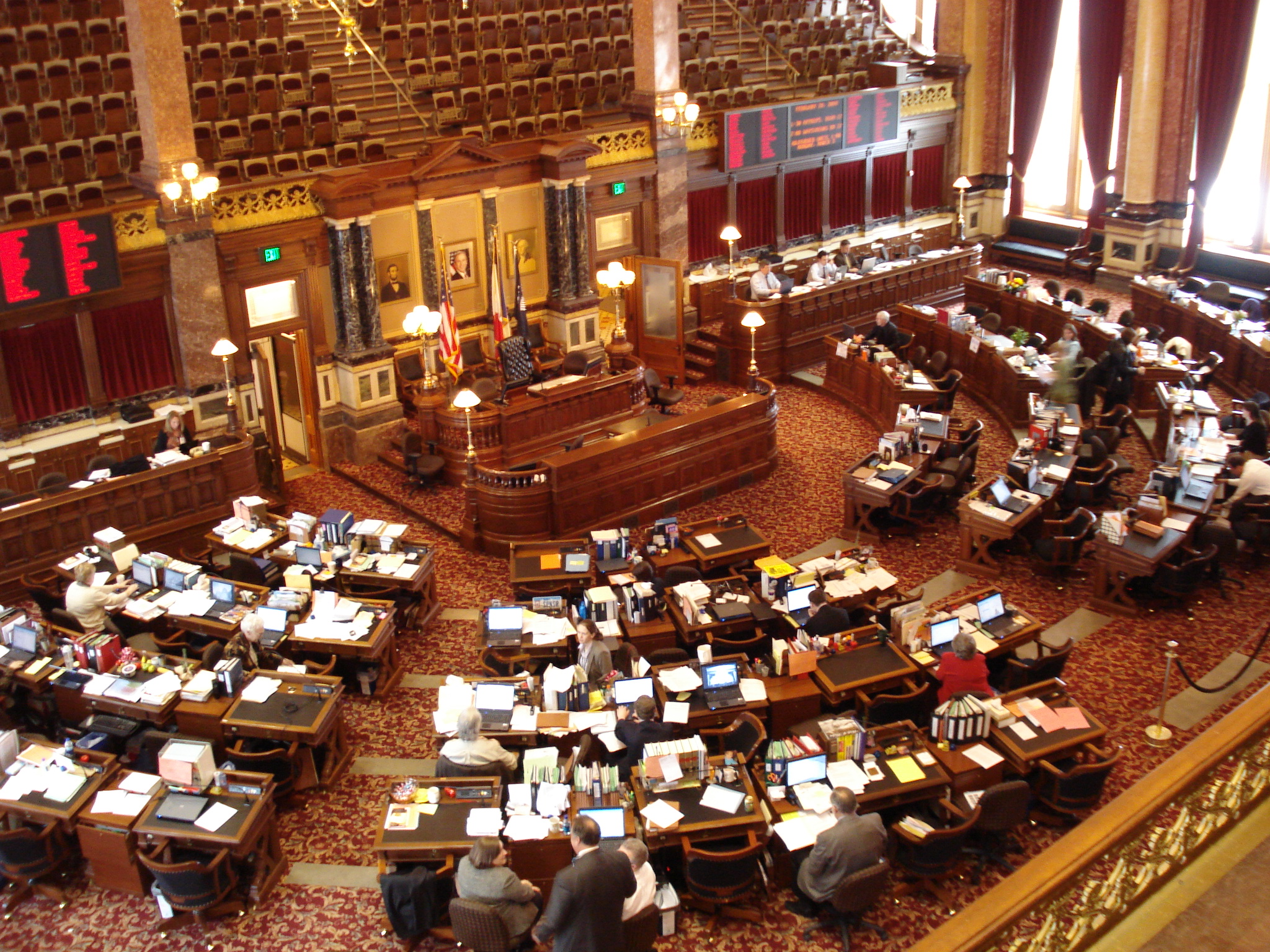
- State Senate Chamber; Iowa State Capitol; Des Moines, Iowa

Website
- Iowa General Assembly

Rules
- 90th General Assembly Senate Rules

The Iowa Senate is the upper house of the Iowa General Assembly. There are 50 seats in the Iowa Senate, representing 50 single-member districts across the state of Iowa with populations of approximately 63,807 per constituency, as of the 2020 United States census. Each Senate district is composed of two House districts. The Senate meets at the Iowa State Capitol in Des Moines.

== Terms ==
Like members of the Iowa House of Representatives, Iowa state senators serve without term limits, and are elected in November for terms starting the following January. Unlike Iowa state representatives, who are elected to two year terms, senators are elected to four-year terms, which are staggered so that half the Senate is up for reelection every two years. In years divisible by 4 (United States presidential election years), elections are held in even-numbered state senate districts. Two years later, elections are held in odd-numbered state senate districts.

=== Redistricting ===
In election years following redistricting (years ending in digit 2, such as 2002), senate districts scheduled to hold elections two years earlier are called "holdover senatorial districts". Iowa Code Section 42.4 includes special rules for holdover senatorial districts. When there is one and only one incumbent senator residing in a holdover senatorial district, that incumbent senator continues in the senate, representing the district for the final two years of the term. When more than one incumbent senator resides in a holdover senatorial district and wishes to remain in the senate, there is an election in that district for the final two years of the term.

== Leadership ==
The President of the Senate presides over the body, whose powers include referring bills to committees, recognizing members during debate, and making procedural rulings. Unlike the more powerful Speaker of the Iowa House of Representatives, the Senate President cannot appoint committee chairmanships or shuffle committee memberships. The lieutenant governor of Iowa was the presiding officer of the Senate until 1988, when an amendment to the Constitution of Iowa was passed in a referendum (effective from 1991). The other partisan Senate leadership positions, such as the Majority and Minority leaders, are elected by their respective party caucuses to head their parties in the chamber.

The President of the Senate is Republican Amy Sinclair of the 12th District. The Majority Leader is Republican Mike Klimesh of the 32nd District. The Minority Leader is Democrat Janice Weiner of the 36th District.

== Committee leadership ==
Committee	Chair	Vice chair	Ranking member
Agriculture	Dan Zumbach	Annette Sweeney	Kevin Kinney
Appropriations	Tim Kraayenbrink	Mark Lofgren	Joe Bolkcom
Commerce	Jason Schultz	Carrie Koelker	Jim Lykam
Education	Amy Sinclair	Jeff Taylor	Herman Quirmbach
Ethics	Carrie Koelker	Jim Carlin	Pam Jochum
Government Oversight	Jason Schultz	Craig Williams	
Human Resources	Jeff Edler	Mark Costello	Liz Mathis
Judiciary	Brad Zaun	Julian Garrett	Kevin Kinney
Labor and Business Relations	Zach Whiting	Jesse Green	Nate Boulton
Local Government	Tom Shipley	Mike Klimesh	Jackie Smith
Natural Resources and Environment	Annette Sweeney	Dawn Driscoll	Sarah Trone Garriott
Rules and Administration	Jack Whitver	Jake Chapman	Zach Wahls
State Government	Roby Smith	Chris Cournoyer	Tony Bisignano
Transportation	Waylon Brown	Adrian Dickey	Eric Giddens
Veterans Affairs	Jim Carlin	Jeff Reichman	Eric Giddens
Ways and Means	Dan Dawson	Tim Goodwin	Pam Jochum

*All chairs and vice chairs are Republicans. All ranking members are Democrats.

== Current composition ==
Affiliation	Party (shading indicates majority caucus)			Total	Vacant
Affiliation	Democratic	Republican	Independent	Total	Vacant
End 2012	26	23	0	49	1
2013–2014	26	24	0	50	0
Begin 2015	26	24	0	50	0
End 2016 session	26	23	1	50	0
2017–2018	20	29	1	50	0
2019–2022	18	32	0	50	0
2023–2024	16	34	0	50	0
Begin 2025	15	34	0	49	1
January 28, 2025	16	34	0	50	0
June 25, 2025	16	33	0	49	1
August 26, 2025	17	33	0	50	0
October 6, 2025	16	33	0	49	1
December 30, 2025	17	33	0	50	0
June 8, 2026	17	32	0	49	1
Latest voting share	34.7%	65.3%			

== Senators ==
Iowa senators as of December 30, 2025
District	Name	Party	Counties	Start	Standing committee leader	Appropriations subcommittee member
1	Catelin Drey	Democratic	Woodbury	2025 (Note: First elected in an August 26, 2025 special election.)		
2	Jeff Taylor	Republican	Plymouth and Sioux	2020	Education (Vice Chair)	Education (Chair)
3	Lynn Evans	Republican	Osceola, O'Brien, Clay, Cherokee, and Buena Vista	2022		Education
4	Tim Kraayenbrink	Republican	Calhoun, Pocahontas, Sac, and Webster	2014	Appropriations (Chair), Technology (Vice Chair)	
5	Dave Rowley	Republican	Clay, Dickinson, Emmet, Kossuth, Palo Alto, and Winnebago	2020		Administration and Regulation Appropriations (Chair)
6	Jason Schultz	Republican	Audubon, Carroll, Crawford, Ida, and Shelby	2014	State Government (Chair)	
7	Kevin Alons	Republican	Cherokee, Monona, Plymouth, and Woodbury	2022		Health and Human Services
8	Mark Costello	Republican	Fremont, Harrison, Mills, and Pottawattamie	2014 (Note: First elected in a December 30, 2014 special election.)	Ethics (Vice Chair)	Health and Human Services (Chair)
9	Tom Shipley	Republican	Adams, Cass, Montgomery, Page, Ringgold, Taylor, and Union	2014	Ethics (Chair), Natural Resources and Environment (Vice Chair)	Agriculture and Natural Resources
10	Dan Dawson	Republican	Pottawattamie	2016	Ways and Means (Chair)	
11	Vacant		Marion and Warren			
12	Amy Sinclair	Republican	Adair, Appanoose, Clarke, Dallas, Decatur, Lucas, Madison, Union, and Wayne	2012	Government Oversight (Chair), Rules and Administration (Vice Chair)	
13	Cherielynn Westrich	Republican	Appanoose, Davis, Monroe, and Wapello	2022		Justice System (Vice Chair)
14	Sarah Trone Garriott	Democratic	Dallas	2020	Health and Human Services (Ranking Member)	Health and Human Services
15	Tony Bisignano	Democratic	Polk	2014	State Government (Ranking Member), Agriculture (Ranking Member)	
16	Renee Hardman	Democratic	Dallas and Polk	2025 (Note: First elected in a December 30, 2025 special election)		
17	Izaah Knox	Democratic	Polk	2022	Natural Resources and Environment (Ranking Member)	Education
18	Janet Petersen	Democratic	Polk	2012	Appropriations (Ranking Member)	Transportation, Infrastructure, and Capitals (Ranking Member)
19	Ken Rozenboom	Republican	Jasper, Mahaska, and Marion	2012	Agriculture (Vice Chair), Education (Chair)	
20	Mike Pike	Republican	Polk	2024		
21	Mike Bousselot	Republican	Polk	2022	Commerce (Vice Chair)	Transportation, Infrastructure, and Capitals (Vice Chair)
22	Matt Blake	Democratic	Polk	2024		
23	Jack Whitver	Republican	Dallas and Polk	2011 (Note: First elected in a January 18, 2011 special election.)	Rules and Administration (Chair)	
24	Jesse Green	Republican	Boone, Dallas, Greene, Guthrie, and Story	2020	Local Government (Chair)	
25	Herman Quirmbach	Democratic	Story	2002	Education (Ranking Member)	Economic Development
26	Kara Warme	Republican	Marshall and Story	2024		
27	Annette Sweeney	Republican	Black Hawk, Grundy, Hardin, Poweshiek, and Tama	2018	Natural Resources and Environment (Chair)	Agriculture and Natural Resources (Vice Chair)
28	Dennis Guth	Republican	Franklin, Hancock, Hamilton, Humbolt, and Wright	2012	N/A	Administration and Regulation (Vice Chair)
29	Sandy Salmon	Republican	Bremer, Butler, Chickasaw, and Floyd	2022	Veterans Affairs (Vice Chair)	Justice System
30	Doug Campbell	Republican	Cerro Gordo, Floyd, Mitchell, and Worth	2024		
31	William Dotzler	Democratic	Black Hawk	2002	Veterans Affairs (Ranking Member)	Economic Development (Ranking Member)
32	Mike Klimesh	Republican	Allamakee, Clayton, Fayette, Howard, and Winneshiek	2020	Government Oversight (Vice Chair); Transportation (Chair)	Health and Human Services
33	Carrie Koelker	Republican	Dubuque, Jones, and Jackson	2018	Was and Means (Vice Chair)	Transportation, Infrastructure, and Capitals (Chair)
34	Dan Zumbach	Republican	Black Hawk, Buchanan, Delaware, Dubuque, and Fayette	2012	Appropriations(Vice Chair)	Agriculture and Natural Resources (Chair)
35	Mike Zimmer	Democratic	Clinton, Jackson, and Scott	2025 (Note: First elected in a January 28, 2025 special election.)		
36	Thomas Townsend	Democratic	Dubuque	2024		
37	Molly Donahue	Democratic	Linn	2022	Workforce (Ranking Member)	Health and Human Services (Ranking Member)
38	Dave Sires	Republican	Benton, Black Hawk, and Tama	2024		
39	Liz Bennett	Democratic	Linn	2022	Technology (Ranking Member)	Transportation, Infrastructure, and Capitals
40	Art Staed	Democratic	Linn	2024		
41	Kerry Gruenhagen	Republican	Cedar, Muscatine, and Scott	2022		Economic Development
42	Charlie McClintock	Republican	Benton and Linn	2022	Workforce (Vice Chair)	Justice System
43	Zach Wahls	Democratic	Johnson	2018	Rules and Administration (Ranking Member)	
44	Adrian Dickey	Republican	Henry, Jefferson, Keokuk, Mahaska, and Van Buren	2021 (Note: First elected in a January 26, 2021 special election.)	Workforce (Chair); Transportation (Vice Chair)	Economic Development
45	Janice Weiner	Democratic	Johnson	2022	Local Government (Ranking Member)	Agriculture and Natural Resources
46	Dawn Driscoll	Republican	Iowa, Johnson. and Washington	2020	Agriculture (Chair)	
47	Scott Webster	Republican	Scott	2022		Administration and Regulation
48	Mark Lofgren	Republican	Des Moines, Henry, Louisa, and Muscatine	2016	Local Government (Vice Chair)	Economic Development (Chair)
49	Cindy Winckler	Democratic	Scott	2022	Ethics (Ranking Member)	Education (Ranking Member)
50	Jeff Reichman	Republican	Des Moines and Lee	2020	Veterans Affairs (Chair)	

== Past notable members ==
=== Federal offices ===
10 members became US Senators including: Samuel J. Kirkwood, George G. Wright, James F. Wilson, Albert B. Cummins (also served as President Pro Tempore of the Senate), Lafayette Young, George A. Wilson, Guy Gillette, Jack Miller, Roger Jepsen and Joni Ernst.

5 members became members of the US House of Representatives including: James F. Wilson, Madison Miner Walden, Steve King, Randy Feenstra and Mariannette Miller-Meeks.

3 members became Federal Cabinet Members including: Samuel J. Kirkwood as Secretary of Interior, George W. McCrary, Secretary of War and Tom Vilsack as Secretary of Agriculture.

=== State offices ===
13 members became Governor including: Samuel J. Kirkwood, William Larrabee, Beryl F. Carroll, Albert B. Cummins, Warren Garst, John Hammill (served as Acting Governor in 1922, then Governor in 1925), Daniel Webster Turner, George A. Wilson, William S. Beardsley, Leo Elthon, Robert D. Fulton, Tom Vilsack and Kim Reynolds.

28 members became Lieutenant Governor including: Nicholas J. Rusch, John R. Needham, Enoch W. Eastman, Benjamin F. Gue, John Scott, Madison Miner Walden, Henry C. Bulis, Joseph Dysart, Frank T. Campbell, Alfred N. Poyneer, Samuel L. Bestow, Warren S. Dungan, Mathies Parrott, Warren Garst, John Hammill, Clem F. Kimball, Arch W. McFarlane, John K. Valentine, Kenneth A. Evans, Leo Elthon, Edward J. McManus, Robert D. Fulton, Roger Jepsen, Arthur Neu, Joy Corning, Patty Judge, Kim Reynolds and Chris Cournoyer.

1 member was twice the Chief Justice of the Iowa Supreme Court and Associate Justice of the Iowa Supreme Court: George G. Wright

3 members held state level elected positions including: Beryl F. Carroll as Iowa State Auditor from 1903 to 1909, Richard C. Turner as Attorney General of Iowa from 1968 to 1979 and Patty Judge as Iowa Secretary of Agriculture from 1999 to 2007.

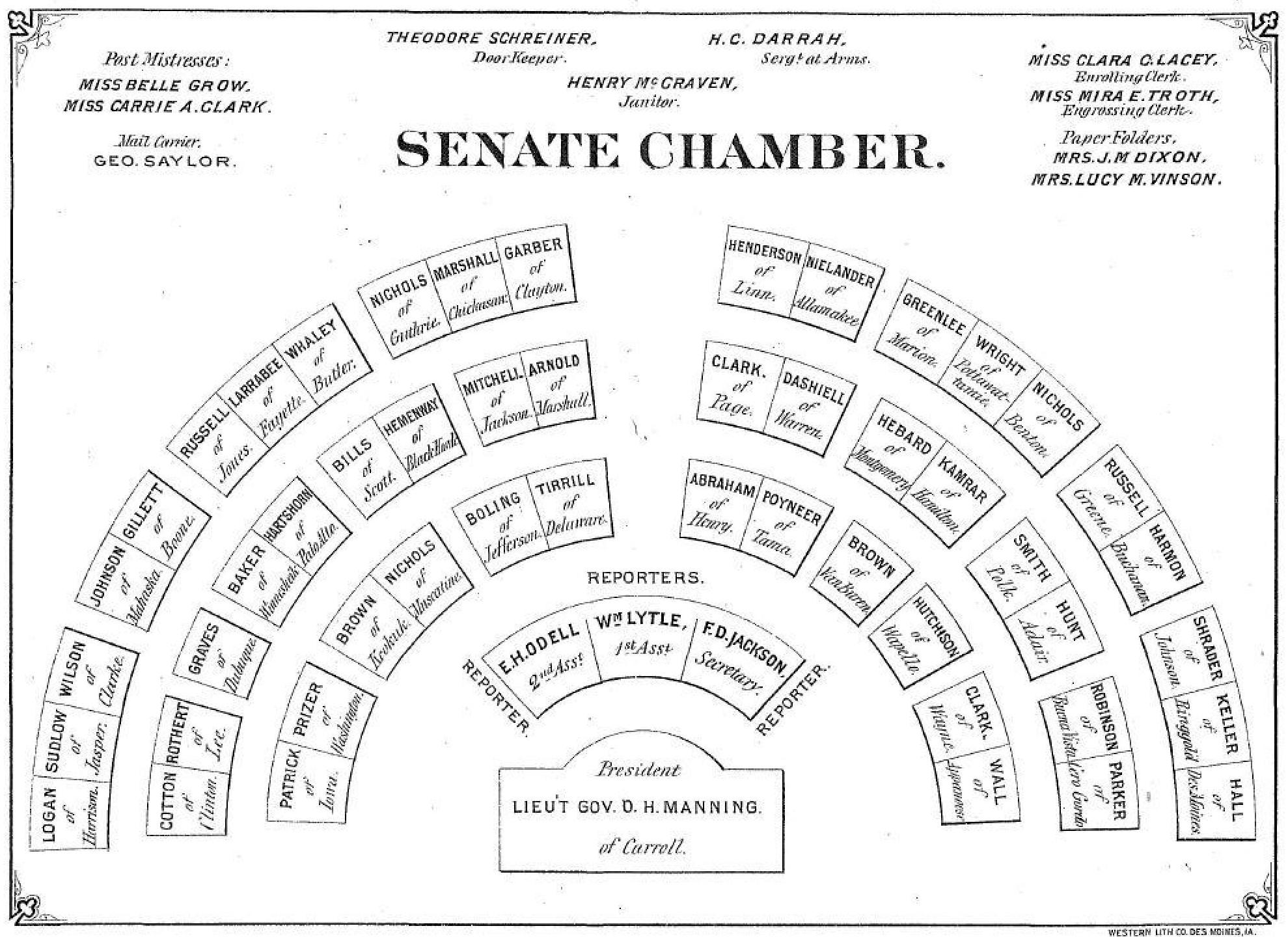
Senate chamber seating chart detail from the 1882 Iowa Redbook

== See also ==
- List of current members of the Iowa Senate
- Iowa House of Representatives
