= 1940 Iowa Senate election =

- November 5, 1940

29 out of 50 seats in the Iowa State Senate 26 seats needed for a majority
	Majority party	Minority party
Party	Republican	Democratic
Last election	38	12
Seats after	45	5
Seat change	▲7	▼7
- Results; Democratic gain Republican gain Democratic hold Republican hold

The 1940 Iowa State Senate elections took place as part of the biennial 1940 United States elections. Iowa voters elected state senators in 29 of the state senate's 50 districts. State senators serve four-year terms in the Iowa State Senate.

A statewide map of the 50 state Senate districts in the 1940 elections is provided by the Iowa General Assembly here.

The primary election on June 3, 1940, determined which candidates appeared on the November 5, 1940 general election ballot.

Following the previous election, Republicans had control of the Iowa state Senate with 38 seats to Democrats' 12 seats.

To claim control of the chamber from Republicans, the Democrats needed to net 14 Senate seats.

Republicans maintained control of the Iowa State Senate following the 1940 general election with the balance of power shifting to Republicans holding 45 seats and Democrats having 5 seats (a net gain of 7 seats for Republicans).

== Summary of Results ==
- Note: The 21 holdover Senators not up for re-election are not listed on this table.

State Senate District	Incumbent	Party	Elected Senator	Party
2nd	Sanford Zeigler	Rep	Sanford Zeigler	Rep
3rd	Hugh G. Guernsey	Dem	Dewey Emmitt Goode	Rep
4th	Harold V. Levis	Rep	Clarence L. Clark	Rep
5th	Howard W. Edwards	Rep	Stephen Ray Emerson	Rep
6th	Ole John Kirketeg	Rep	William Oliver Turner	Rep
8th	Kenneth A. Evans	Rep	Kenneth A. Evans	Rep
11th	William S. Beardsley	Rep	Floyd Arden Jones	Rep
14th	Albert Earl Augustine	Dem	Albert Earl Augustine	Dem
15th	Hugh W. Lundy	Rep	Hugh W. Lundy	Rep
16th	Ora E. Husted	Rep	Harry Samuel Love	Rep
17th	George M. Hopkins	Rep	Ai Miller	Rep
19th	Morris W. Moore	Dem	De Vere Watson	Rep
23rd	Frank E. Ellis	Dem	DuFay D. Fuller	Rep
24th	Henry Delbert Miller	Dem	Marion Claire Hamiel	Rep
25th	Frederick Conrad Schadt	Rep	Leroy Samuel Mercer	Dem
26th	Frank C. Byers	Rep	Frank C. Byers	Rep
27th	Edward Joseph Breen	Dem	Charles V. Findlay	Rep
28th	Benjamin Chase Whitehill	Rep	Benjamin Chase Whitehill	Rep
31st	Lant H. Doran	Rep	John R. Hattery	Rep
32nd	Linus Forsling	Rep	Robert Prentis Munger	Rep
33rd	George L. Parker	Rep	Irving D. Long	Rep
36th	Martin X. Geske	Dem	Gerald W. Hunt	Rep
39th	Clermont Colfax Smith	Rep	J. Kendall Lynes	Rep
40th	Paul Palmer Stewart	Rep	Paul Palmer Stewart	Rep
41st	Leo Elthon	Rep	Leo Elthon	Rep
43rd	Earl M. Dean	Dem	Oscar E. Johnson	Dem
46th	Winfred Mighell	Dem	Raymond Edward Hess	Rep
47th	Lester S. Gillette	Dem	Robert Keir	Rep
49th	Charles Bernard Hoeven	Rep	Jans T. "J. T." Dykhouse	Rep

== Detailed Results ==
- NOTE: The 21 districts that did not hold elections in 1940 are not listed here.
- Note: If a district does not list a primary, then that district did not have a competitive primary (i.e., there may have only been one candidate file for that district).

=== District 2 ===
Iowa Senate, District 2 General Election, 1940
Party	Candidate	Votes	%
Republican	Sanford Zeigler, Jr. (incumbent)	9,354	100.0
Total votes		9,354	100.0
Republican hold			

=== District 3 ===
Iowa Senate, District 3 General Election, 1940
Party	Candidate	Votes	%
Republican	Dewey E. Goode	9,795	55.2
Democratic	Jess Exline	7,934	44.8
Total votes		17,729	100.0
Republican gain from Democratic			

=== District 4 ===
Iowa Senate, District 4 General Election, 1940
Party	Candidate	Votes	%
Republican	Clarence L. Clark	7,622	55.8
Democratic	Arch Jones	6,026	44.2
Total votes		13,648	100.0
Republican hold			

=== District 5 ===
Iowa Senate, District 5 General Election, 1940
Party	Candidate	Votes	%
Republican	S. Ray Emerson	12,653	100.0
Total votes		12,653	100.0
Republican hold			

=== District 6 ===
Iowa Senate, District 6 Republican Primary Election, 1940
Party	Candidate	Votes	%
Republican	Oliver Turner	2,734	54.3
Republican	Watts	2,302	45.7
Total votes		5,036	100.0

Iowa Senate, District 6 General Election, 1940
Party	Candidate	Votes	%
Republican	Oliver Turner	7,318	62.2
Democratic	C. T. Mercer	4,443	37.8
Total votes		11,761	100.0
Republican hold			

=== District 8 ===
Iowa Senate, District 8 General Election, 1940
Party	Candidate	Votes	%
Republican	K. A. Evans (incumbent)	8,439	60.3
Democratic	L. A. Nelson	5,555	39.7
Total votes		13,994	100.0
Republican hold			

=== District 11 ===
Iowa Senate, District 11 Republican Primary Election, 1940
Party	Candidate	Votes	%
Republican	Floyd Jones	2,772	57.8
Republican	Lowe	2,023	42.2
Total votes		4,795	100.0

Iowa Senate, District 11 General Election, 1940
Party	Candidate	Votes	%
Republican	Floyd Jones	7,973	59.2
Democratic	Frank Gonseth	5,486	40.8
Total votes		13,459	100.0
Republican hold			

=== District 14 ===
Iowa Senate, District 14 General Election, 1940
Party	Candidate	Votes	%
Democratic	A. E. Augustine (incumbent)	5,631	52.5
Republican	F. C. Stanley	5,096	47.5
Total votes		10,727	100.0
Democratic hold			

=== District 15 ===
Iowa Senate, District 15 Republican Primary Election, 1940
Party	Candidate	Votes	%
Republican	Hugh W. Lundy (incumbent)	3,988	75.3
Republican	Brady	1,310	24.7
Total votes		5,298	100.0

Iowa Senate, District 15 General Election, 1940
Party	Candidate	Votes	%
Republican	Hugh W. Lundy (incumbent)	9,865	52.6
Democratic	F. M. Roberts	8,877	47.4
Total votes		18,742	100.0
Republican hold			

=== District 16 ===
Iowa Senate, District 16 Republican Primary Election, 1940
Party	Candidate	Votes	%
Republican	H. S. Love	2,451	52.7
Republican	Ehm	2,201	47.3
Total votes		4,652	100.0

Iowa Senate, District 16 General Election, 1940
Party	Candidate	Votes	%
Republican	H. S. Love	8,231	62.4
Democratic	C. H. Wicks	4,958	37.6
Total votes		13,189	100.0
Republican hold			

=== District 17 ===
Iowa Senate, District 17 Republican Primary Election, 1940
Party	Candidate	Votes	%
Republican	Ai Miller	4,930	64.8
Republican	McQuirk	2,678	35.2
Total votes		7,608	100.0

Iowa Senate, District 17 General Election, 1940
Party	Candidate	Votes	%
Republican	Ai Miller	13,380	55.2
Democratic	J. A. Graham	10,845	44.8
Total votes		24,225	100.0
Republican hold			

=== District 19 ===
Iowa Senate, District 19 Republican Primary Election, 1940
Party	Candidate	Votes	%
Republican	DeVere Watson	1,437	33.8
Republican	Lutz	879	20.7
Republican	Ferguson	740	17.5
Republican	Langstrom	683	16.1
Republican	Ritchie	507	11.9
Total votes		4,246	100.0

Iowa Senate, District 19 Democratic Primary Election, 1940
Party	Candidate	Votes	%
Democratic	Dr. M. Moore (incumbent)	1,175	62.0
Democratic	Morris	719	38.0
Total votes		1,894	100.0

Iowa Senate, District 19 General Election, 1940
Party	Candidate	Votes	%
Republican	DeVere Watson	15,426	51.7
Democratic	Dr. M. Moore (incumbent)	14,421	48.3
Total votes		29,847	100.0
Republican gain from Democratic			

=== District 23 ===
Iowa Senate, District 23 Republican Primary Election, 1940
Party	Candidate	Votes	%
Republican	D. D. Fuller	629	60.5
Republican	Spiro	411	39.5
Total votes		1,040	100.0

Iowa Senate, District 23 Democratic Primary Election, 1940
Party	Candidate	Votes	%
Democratic	Frank E. Ellis (incumbent)	1,213	69.6
Democratic	Wilcke	529	30.4
Total votes		1,742	100.0

Iowa Senate, District 23 General Election, 1940
Party	Candidate	Votes	%
Republican	D. D. Fuller	4,620	52.3
Democratic	Frank E. Ellis (incumbent)	4,213	47.7
Total votes		8,833	100.0
Republican gain from Democratic			

=== District 24 ===
Iowa Senate, District 24 General Election, 1940
Party	Candidate	Votes	%
Republican	M. C. Hamiel	10,098	57.4
Democratic	La Mar Foster	7,480	42.6
Total votes		17,578	100.0
Republican gain from Democratic			

=== District 25 ===
Iowa Senate, District 25 Republican Primary Election, 1940
Party	Candidate	Votes	%
Republican	Frederick C. Schadt (incumbent)	2,196	51.3
Republican	Ries	2,082	48.7
Total votes		4,278	100.0

Iowa Senate, District 25 Democratic Primary Election, 1940
Party	Candidate	Votes	%
Democratic	Leroy S. Mercer	1,969	53.3
Democratic	Whiting	1,728	46.7
Total votes		3,697	100.0

Iowa Senate, District 25 General Election, 1940
Party	Candidate	Votes	%
Democratic	Leroy S. Mercer	11,608	50.6
Republican	Frederick C. Schadt (incumbent)	11,321	49.4
Total votes		22,929	100.0
Democratic gain from Republican			

=== District 26 ===
Iowa Senate, District 26 General Election, 1940
Party	Candidate	Votes	%
Republican	Frank C. Byers (incumbent)	23,411	56.3
Democratic	Marvin I. Burkholder	18,180	43.7
Total votes		41,591	100.0
Republican hold			

=== District 27 ===
Iowa Senate, District 27 Republican Primary Election, 1940
Party	Candidate	Votes	%
Republican	C. V. Findlay	3,433	67.4
Republican	Kime	1,659	32.6
Total votes		5,092	100.0

Iowa Senate, District 27 General Election, 1940
Party	Candidate	Votes	%
Republican	C. V. Findlay	11,507	52.5
Democratic	Irving E. Black	10,414	47.5
Total votes		21,921	100.0
Republican gain from Democratic			

=== District 28 ===
Iowa Senate, District 28 Republican Primary Election, 1940
Party	Candidate	Votes	%
Republican	B. C. Whitehill (incumbent)	2,218	52.0
Republican	Knudson	2,051	48.0
Total votes		4,269	100.0

Iowa Senate, District 28 General Election, 1940
Party	Candidate	Votes	%
Republican	B. C. Whitehill (incumbent)	8,490	62.6
Democratic	Mrs. Laura Aves	5,073	37.4
Total votes		13,563	100.0
Republican hold			

=== District 31 ===
Iowa Senate, District 31 Republican Primary Election, 1940
Party	Candidate	Votes	%
Republican	John R. Hattery	4,911	57.7
Republican	Lookingbill	3,597	42.3
Total votes		8,508	100.0

Iowa Senate, District 31 General Election, 1940
Party	Candidate	Votes	%
Republican	John R. Hattery	13,793	60.7
Democratic	Carl L. Little	8,920	39.3
Total votes		22,713	100.0
Republican hold			

=== District 32 ===
Iowa Senate, District 32 Republican Primary Election, 1940
Party	Candidate	Votes	%
Republican	Robert P. Munger	4,087	65.9
Republican	Lockie	1,545	24.9
Republican	Brand	359	5.8
Republican	Skaff	210	3.4
Total votes		6,201	100.0

Iowa Senate, District 32 Democratic Primary Election, 1940
Party	Candidate	Votes	%
Democratic	Donald M. Pendleton	1,062	38.8
Democratic	Davidson	878	32.1
Democratic	McCoun	795	29.1
Total votes		2,735	100.0

Iowa Senate, District 32 General Election, 1940
Party	Candidate	Votes	%
Republican	Robert P. Munger	22,939	53.2
Democratic	Donald M. Pendleton	20,167	46.8
Total votes		43,106	100.0
Republican hold			

=== District 33 ===
Iowa Senate, District 33 Republican Primary Election, 1940
Party	Candidate	Votes	%
Republican	Irving D. Long	3,130	50.8
Republican	Morrow	3,037	49.2
Total votes		6,167	100.0

Iowa Senate, District 33 General Election, 1940
Party	Candidate	Votes	%
Republican	Irving D. Long	11,607	100.0
Total votes		11,607	100.0
Republican hold			

=== District 36 ===
Iowa Senate, District 36 General Election, 1940
Party	Candidate	Votes	%
Republican	G. W. Hunt	6,927	58.5
Democratic	A. H. Borman	4,923	41.5
Total votes		11,850	100.0
Republican gain from Democratic			

=== District 39 ===
Iowa Senate, District 39 Republican Primary Election, 1940
Party	Candidate	Votes	%
Republican	J. Kendall Lynes	2,427	54.3
Republican	Brown	2,042	45.7
Total votes		4,469	100.0

Iowa Senate, District 39 Democratic Primary Election, 1940
Party	Candidate	Votes	%
Democratic	L. H. Meyer	838	54.6
Democratic	Ryan	698	45.4
Total votes		1,536	100.0

Iowa Senate, District 39 General Election, 1940
Party	Candidate	Votes	%
Republican	J. Kendall Lynes	9,631	65.6
Democratic	L. H. Meyer	5,041	34.4
Total votes		14,672	100.0
Republican hold			

=== District 40 ===
Iowa Senate, District 40 General Election, 1940
Party	Candidate	Votes	%
Republican	Paul P. Stewart (incumbent)	13,363	60.8
Democratic	Joseph B. Steele	8,617	39.2
Total votes		21,980	100.0
Republican hold			

=== District 41 ===
Iowa Senate, District 41 Republican Primary Election, 1940
Party	Candidate	Votes	%
Republican	Leo Elthon (incumbent)	4,094	60.1
Republican	Gunderson	2,716	39.9
Total votes		6,810	100.0

Iowa Senate, District 41 General Election, 1940
Party	Candidate	Votes	%
Republican	Leo Elthon (incumbent)	10,443	100.0
Total votes		10,443	100.0
Republican hold			

=== District 43 ===
Iowa Senate, District 43 Republican Primary Election, 1940
Party	Candidate	Votes	%
Republican	Ralph R. Stuart	4,807	53.5
Republican	Van Wert	4,186	46.5
Total votes		8,993	100.0

Iowa Senate, District 43 General Election, 1940
Party	Candidate	Votes	%
Democratic	Oscar E. Johnson	16,029	51.4
Republican	Ralph R. Stuart	15,166	48.6
Total votes		31,195	100.0
Democratic hold			

=== District 46 ===
Iowa Senate, District 46 Democratic Primary Election, 1940
Party	Candidate	Votes	%
Democratic	L. J. McGivern	1,236	43.6
Democratic	Kieffer	964	34.1
Democratic	Winfred Mighell (incumbent)	630	22.3
Total votes		2,830	100.0

Iowa Senate, District 46 General Election, 1940
Party	Candidate	Votes	%
Republican	R. E. Hess	13,076	57.0
Democratic	L. J. McGivern	9,870	43.0
Total votes		22,946	100.0
Republican gain from Democratic			

=== District 47 ===
Iowa Senate, District 47 Republican Primary Election, 1940
Party	Candidate	Votes	%
Republican	Robert Keir	4,136	50.4
Republican	Ketcham	4,066	49.6
Total votes		8,202	100.0

Iowa Senate, District 47 General Election, 1940
Party	Candidate	Votes	%
Republican	Robert Keir	16,331	50.1
Democratic	A. H. Bonnstetter	16,285	49.9
Total votes		32,616	100.0
Republican gain from Democratic			

=== District 49 ===
Iowa Senate, District 49 Republican Primary Election, 1940
Party	Candidate	Votes	%
Republican	J. T. Dykhouse	2,953	43.5
Republican	Hughes	2,128	31.4
Republican	Grotters	1,704	25.1
Total votes		6,785	100.0

Iowa Senate, District 49 General Election, 1940
Party	Candidate	Votes	%
Republican	J. T. Dykhouse	17,656	61.7
Democratic	Charles J. Zylstra	10,968	38.3
Total votes		28,624	100.0
Republican hold			

== See also ==
- United States elections, 1940
- United States House of Representatives elections in Iowa, 1940
- Elections in Iowa
