= 1948 Iowa Senate election =

- November 5, 1948

29 out of 50 seats in the Iowa State Senate 26 seats needed for a majority
	Majority party	Minority party
Party	Republican	Democratic
Last election	46	4
Seats after	43	7
Seat change	▼3	▲3

The 1948 Iowa State Senate elections took place as part of the biennial 1948 United States elections. Iowa voters elected state senators in 29 of the state senate's 50 districts. State senators serve four-year terms in the Iowa State Senate.

A statewide map of the 50 state Senate districts in the year 1948 is provided by the Iowa General Assembly here.

The primary election on June 3, 1948, determined which candidates appeared on the November 5, 1948 general election ballot.

Following the previous election, Republicans had control of the Iowa state Senate with 46 seats to Democrats' 4 seats.

To claim control of the chamber from Republicans, the Democrats needed to net 22 Senate seats.

Republicans maintained control of the Iowa State Senate following the 1948 general election with the balance of power shifting to Republicans holding 43 seats and Democrats having 7 seats (a net gain of 3 seats for Democrats).

== Summary of Results ==
- Note: The 21 holdover Senators not up for re-election are not listed on this table.

State Senate District	Incumbent	Party	Elected Senator	Party
2nd	Alden Loring Doud	Rep	Alden Loring Doud	Rep
3rd	James R. Barkley	Rep	Sherman West	Dem
4th	James Alonzo Newsome	Rep	Pearl Wayland McMurry	Rep
5th	Roy B. Hawkins	Rep	Xavier Thomas Prentis	Rep
6th	Kathlyn M. Kirketeg	Rep	Ernest L. Humbert	Rep
8th	Oscar N. Hultman	Rep	Oscar N. Hultman	Rep
11th	Floyd Arden Jones	Rep	Loyd Van Patten	Rep
14th	Albert Earl Augustine	Dem	Albert Earl Augustine	Dem
15th	Tunis H. Klein	Dem	Francis M. Roberts	Dem
16th	John Lyle Musmaker	Rep	Raymond R. Gillespie	Dem
17th	Ai Miller	Rep	Glenn Edwin Whitehead	Rep
19th	De Vere Watson	Rep	De Vere Watson	Rep
23rd	Edwin Charles Schluter	Rep	John Milton Tudor	Rep
24th	Jans T. "J. T." Dykhouse	Rep	Jans T. "J. T." Dykhouse	Rep
25th	Leroy Samuel Mercer	Dem	Leroy Samuel Mercer	Dem
26th	Frank C. Byers	Rep	Frank C. Byers	Rep
27th	Charles V. Findlay	Rep	Paul E. McCarville	Rep
28th	Robert A. Rockhill	Rep	Warren Eldon Walter	Rep
31st	Janious G. Lucas	Rep	John R. Hattery	Rep
32nd	Adrian D. Clem	Rep	Charles S. Van Eaton	Rep
33rd	Irving D. Long	Rep	Donald Alexander Risk	Rep
36th	Fern Eugene Sharp	Rep	Fern Eugene Sharp	Rep
39th	J. Kendall Lynes	Rep	J. Kendall Lynes	Rep
40th	Arthur H. Jacobson	Rep	Arthur H. Jacobson	Rep
41st	Leo Elthon	Rep	Leo Elthon	Rep
43rd	Herman M. Knudson	Rep	Herman M. Knudson	Rep
46th	Frederick James Ritchie	Rep	Edward S. Parker	Rep
47th	Robert Keir	Rep	Harry E. Watson	Rep
49th	Duane E. Dewel	Rep	Burl Nelson Ridout	Dem

== Detailed Results ==
- NOTE: The 21 districts that did not hold elections in 1948 are not listed here.
- Note: If a district does not list a primary, then that district did not have a competitive primary (i.e., there may have only been one candidate file for that district).

=== District 2 ===
Iowa Senate, District 2 General Election, 1948
Party	Candidate	Votes	%
Republican	Alden L. Doud (incumbent)	6,899	100.0
Total votes		6,899	100.0
Republican hold			

=== District 3 ===
Iowa Senate, District 3 General Election, 1948
Party	Candidate	Votes	%
Democratic	Sherman West	7,389	53.0
Republican	W. R. Fimmen	6,542	47.0
Total votes		13,931	100.0
Democratic gain from Republican			

=== District 4 ===
Iowa Senate, District 4 General Election, 1948
Party	Candidate	Votes	%
Republican	P. W. McMurry	5,917	54.3
Democratic	Joe W. Kridelbaugh	4,981	45.7
Total votes		10,898	100.0
Republican hold			

=== District 5 ===
Iowa Senate, District 5 Republican Primary Election, 1948
Party	Candidate	Votes	%
Republican	X. T. Prentis	3,889	58.2
Republican	Sam Holland	2,792	41.8
Total votes		6,681	100.0

Iowa Senate, District 5 General Election, 1948
Party	Candidate	Votes	%
Republican	X. T. Prentis	9,832	100.0
Total votes		9,832	100.0
Republican hold			

=== District 6 ===
Iowa Senate, District 6 General Election, 1948
Party	Candidate	Votes	%
Republican	Ernest L. Humbert	5,515	100.0
Total votes		5,515	100.0
Republican hold			

=== District 8 ===
Iowa Senate, District 8 General Election, 1948
Party	Candidate	Votes	%
Republican	O. N. Hultman (incumbent)	7,318	100.0
Total votes		7,318	100.0
Republican hold			

=== District 11 ===
Iowa Senate, District 11 Republican Primary Election, 1948
Party	Candidate	Votes	%
Republican	Loyd Van Patten	3,047	55.5
Republican	Victor Felter	2,439	44.5
Total votes		5,486	100.0

Iowa Senate, District 11 General Election, 1948
Party	Candidate	Votes	%
Republican	Loyd Van Patten	7,144	100.0
Total votes		7,144	100.0
Republican hold			

=== District 14 ===
Iowa Senate, District 14 General Election, 1948
Party	Candidate	Votes	%
Democratic	A. E. Augustine (incumbent)	4,706	58.4
Republican	G. R. Draper	3,350	41.6
Total votes		8,056	100.0
Democratic hold			

=== District 15 ===
Iowa Senate, District 15 General Election, 1948
Party	Candidate	Votes	%
Democratic	Dr. F. M. Roberts	8,728	55.5
Republican	Hugh Lundy	6,999	44.5
Total votes		15,727	100.0
Democratic hold			

=== District 16 ===
Iowa Senate, District 16 Republican Primary Election, 1948
Party	Candidate	Votes	%
Republican	Virgil E. Smith	2,364	54.1
Republican	Charles H. Neidt	2,007	45.9
Total votes		4,371	100.0

Iowa Senate, District 16 General Election, 1948
Party	Candidate	Votes	%
Democratic	R. R. Gillespie	5,534	50.4
Republican	V. E. Smith	5,444	49.6
Total votes		10,978	100.0
Democratic gain from Republican			

=== District 17 ===
Iowa Senate, District 17 Republican Primary Election, 1948
Party	Candidate	Votes	%
Republican	G. E. Whitehead	4,044	54.8
Republican	Conway E. Morris	3,337	45.2
Total votes		7,381	100.0

Iowa Senate, District 17 General Election, 1948
Party	Candidate	Votes	%
Republican	G. E. Whitehead	10,601	52.3
Democratic	H. R. Hefley	9,676	47.7
Total votes		20,277	100.0
Republican hold			

=== District 19 ===
Iowa Senate, District 19 General Election, 1948
Party	Candidate	Votes	%
Republican	De Vere Watson (incumbent)	12,777	100.0
Total votes		12,777	100.0
Republican hold			

=== District 23 ===
Iowa Senate, District 23 General Election, 1948
Party	Candidate	Votes	%
Republican	J. M. Tudor	10,685	52.0
Democratic	T. E. Stimpson	9,864	48.0
Total votes		20,549	100.0
Republican hold			

=== District 24 ===
Iowa Senate, District 24 Republican Primary Election, 1948
Party	Candidate	Votes	%
Republican	J. T. Dykhouse (incumbent)	2,647	59.2
Republican	Cloy F. McKeegan	1,823	40.8
Total votes		4,470	100.0

Iowa Senate, District 24 General Election, 1948
Party	Candidate	Votes	%
Republican	J. T. Dykhouse (incumbent)	11,044	100.0
Total votes		11,044	100.0
Republican hold			

=== District 25 ===
Iowa Senate, District 25 Republican Primary Election, 1948
Party	Candidate	Votes	%
Republican	D. C. Nolan	2,696	58.9
Republican	Frederick C. Schadt	1,878	41.1
Total votes		4,574	100.0

Iowa Senate, District 25 General Election, 1948
Party	Candidate	Votes	%
Democratic	L. S. Mercer (incumbent)	10,841	51.2
Republican	D. C. Nolan	10,339	48.8
Total votes		21,180	100.0
Democratic hold			

=== District 26 ===
Iowa Senate, District 26 General Election, 1948
Party	Candidate	Votes	%
Republican	F. C. Byers (incumbent)	21,496	53.6
Democratic	D. O. Stentz	18,640	46.4
Total votes		40,136	100.0
Republican hold			

=== District 27 ===
Iowa Senate, District 27 Republican Primary Election, 1948
Party	Candidate	Votes	%
Republican	Paul E. McCarville	2,673	36.7
Republican	B. H. Wilder	2,444	33.6
Republican	Melvin Wilson	2,157	29.7
Total votes		7,274	100.0

Iowa Senate, District 27 General Election, 1948
Party	Candidate	Votes	%
Republican	P. E. McCarville	10,563	52.1
Democratic	E. C. Hovey	9,716	47.9
Total votes		20,279	100.0
Republican hold			

=== District 28 ===
Iowa Senate, District 28 Republican Primary Election, 1948
Party	Candidate	Votes	%
Republican	W. Eldon Walter	2,160	51.8
Republican	Robert A. Rockhill (incumbent)	2,013	48.2
Total votes		4,173	100.0

Iowa Senate, District 28 General Election, 1948
Party	Candidate	Votes	%
Republican	W. Eldon Walter	7,620	100.0
Total votes		7,620	100.0
Republican hold			

=== District 31 ===
Iowa Senate, District 31 Republican Primary Election, 1948
Party	Candidate	Votes	%
Republican	John R. Hattery	4,623	55.5
Republican	Albert Steinberg	3,708	44.5
Total votes		8,331	100.0

Iowa Senate, District 31 General Election, 1948
Party	Candidate	Votes	%
Republican	J. R. Hattery	12,707	60.4
Democratic	D. F. Horning	8,325	39.6
Total votes		21,032	100.0
Republican hold			

=== District 32 ===
Iowa Senate, District 32 Republican Primary Election, 1948
Party	Candidate	Votes	%
Republican	Charles S. Van Eaton	4,722	50.1
Republican	A. D. Clem (incumbent)	4,710	49.9
Total votes		9,432	100.0

Iowa Senate, District 32 General Election, 1948
Party	Candidate	Votes	%
Republican	C. S. Van Eaton	18,842	51.7
Democratic	Gale Stevens	17,616	48.3
Total votes		36,458	100.0
Republican hold			

=== District 33 ===
Iowa Senate, District 33 Republican Primary Election, 1948
Party	Candidate	Votes	%
Republican	Don Risk	2,659	50.7
Republican	R. A. Nelson	2,587	49.3
Total votes		5,246	100.0

Iowa Senate, District 33 General Election, 1948
Party	Candidate	Votes	%
Republican	Don Risk	9,668	100.0
Total votes		9,668	100.0
Republican hold			

=== District 36 ===
Iowa Senate, District 36 Republican Primary Election, 1948
Party	Candidate	Votes	%
Republican	F. E. Sharp (incumbent)	1,345	51.9
Republican	Robert E. Coon	1,249	48.1
Total votes		2,594	100.0

Iowa Senate, District 36 General Election, 1948
Party	Candidate	Votes	%
Republican	F. E. Sharp (incumbent)	4,851	50.3
Democratic	S. E. Myers	4,786	49.7
Total votes		9,637	100.0
Republican hold			

=== District 39 ===
Iowa Senate, District 39 General Election, 1948
Party	Candidate	Votes	%
Republican	J. Kendall Lynes (incumbent)	8,145	100.0
Total votes		8,145	100.0
Republican hold			

=== District 40 ===
Iowa Senate, District 40 Republican Primary Election, 1948
Party	Candidate	Votes	%
Republican	Arthur H. Jacobson (incumbent)	4,194	65.3
Republican	W. Lloyd Bruce	2,226	34.7
Total votes		6,420	100.0

Iowa Senate, District 40 General Election, 1948
Party	Candidate	Votes	%
Republican	A. H. Jacobson (incumbent)	11,034	58.5
Democratic	Lorenz Willman	7,827	41.5
Total votes		18,861	100.0
Republican hold			

=== District 41 ===
Iowa Senate, District 41 General Election, 1948
Party	Candidate	Votes	%
Republican	Leo Elthon (incumbent)	8,373	59.6
Democratic	Ira E. Link	5,675	40.4
Total votes		14,048	100.0
Republican hold			

=== District 43 ===
Iowa Senate, District 43 General Election, 1948
Party	Candidate	Votes	%
Republican	Herman M. Knudson (incumbent)	14,620	100.0
Total votes		14,620	100.0
Republican hold			

=== District 46 ===
Iowa Senate, District 46 Republican Primary Election, 1948
Party	Candidate	Votes	%
Republican	Edward S. Parker	2,915	54.7
Republican	R. E. Hess	2,415	45.3
Total votes		5,330	100.0

Iowa Senate, District 46 General Election, 1948
Party	Candidate	Votes	%
Republican	E. S. Parker	10,037	53.1
Democratic	E. F. Kieffer	8,871	46.9
Total votes		18,908	100.0
Republican hold			

=== District 47 ===
Iowa Senate, District 47 Republican Primary Election, 1948
Party	Candidate	Votes	%
Republican	Harry E. Watson	2,792	59.2
Republican	David G. Ainsworth	1,924	40.8
Total votes		4,716	100.0

Iowa Senate, District 47 General Election, 1948
Party	Candidate	Votes	%
Republican	H. E. Watson	8,422	50.1
Democratic	W. A. Yager	8,378	49.9
Total votes		16,800	100.0
Republican hold			

=== District 49 ===
Iowa Senate, District 49 General Election, 1948
Party	Candidate	Votes	%
Democratic	B. N. Ridout	9,974	51.3
Republican	D. E. Dewel (incumbent)	9,467	48.7
Total votes		19,441	100.0
Democratic gain from Republican			

== See also ==
- United States elections, 1948
- United States House of Representatives elections in Iowa, 1948
- Elections in Iowa
