= 1952 Iowa Senate election =

- November 4, 1952

30 out of 50 seats in the Iowa State Senate 26 seats needed for a majority
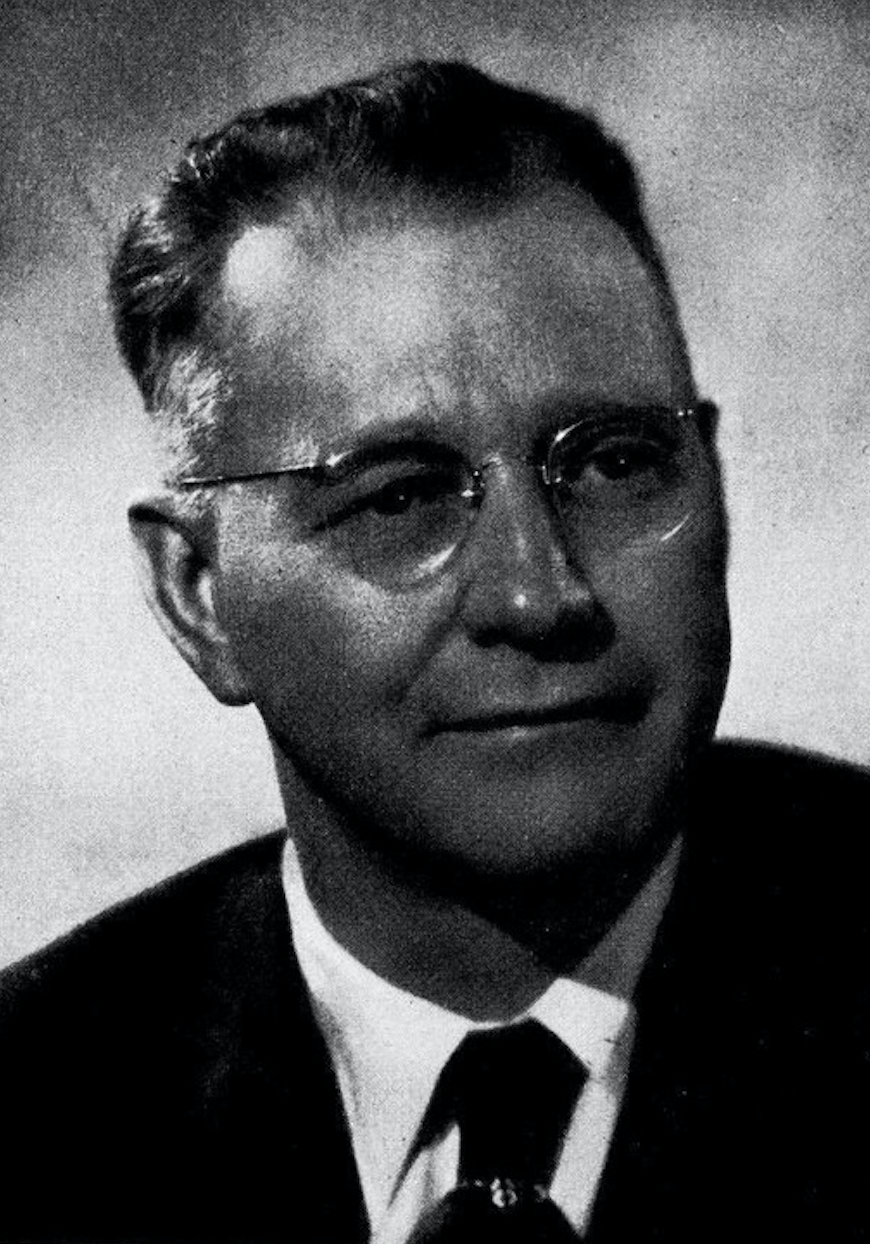
	Majority party	Minority party
		Dem
Leader	Leo Elthon	A. E. Augustine
Party	Republican	Democratic
Leader's seat	41st (retired)	14th (lost re-election)
Last election	41	9
Seats after	46	4
Seat change	▲5	▼5
Majority Leader before election
Leo Elthon
Republican
Elected Majority Leader
Ralph Zastrow
Republican

The 1952 Iowa State Senate elections took place as part of the biennial 1952 United States elections. Iowa voters elected state senators in 30 of the state senate's 50 districts. State senators serve four-year terms in the Iowa State Senate.

A statewide map of the 50 state Senate districts in the year 1952 is provided by the Iowa General Assembly here.

The primary election on June 2, 1952, determined which candidates appeared on the November 4, 1952 general election ballot.

Following the previous election, Republicans had control of the Iowa state Senate with 41 seats to Democrats' 9 seats.

To claim control of the chamber from Republicans, the Democrats needed to net 17 Senate seats.

Republicans maintained control of the Iowa State Senate following the 1952 general election with the balance of power shifting to Republicans holding 46 seats and Democrats having 4 seats (a net gain of 5 seats for Republicans).

== Summary of Results ==
- Note: The 20 holdover Senators not up for re-election are not listed on this table.

State Senate District	Incumbent	Party	Elected Senator	Party
2nd	Alden Loring Doud	Rep	Charles W. Nelson	Rep
3rd	Sherman West	Dem	Ted D. Clark	Rep
4th	Ray Fletcher	Rep	William C. Stuart	Rep
5th	Xavier Thomas Prentis	Rep	Xavier Thomas Prentis	Rep
6th	Ernest L. Humbert	Rep	Thomas C. Larson	Rep
8th	Oscar N. Hultman	Rep	Henry W. Washburn	Rep
11th	Loyd Van Patten	Rep	George Donald Bellman	Rep
14th	Albert Earl Augustine	Dem	Charles Emory Stewart	Rep
15th	Francis M. Roberts	Dem	Leon N. Miller	Dem
16th	Raymond R. Gillespie	Dem	Lorin B. Sayre	Rep
17th	Glenn Edwin Whitehead	Rep	Glenn Edwin Whitehead	Rep
19th	De Vere Watson	Rep	De Vere Watson	Rep
22nd	Otto H. Henningsen	Rep	Erwin A. Schoening	Rep
23rd	John Milton Tudor	Rep	David Earl Elijah	Rep
24th	Jans T. "J. T." Dykhouse	Rep	Jans T. "J. T." Dykhouse	Rep
25th	Leroy Samuel Mercer	Dem	Daniel Clifford "D. C." Nolan	Rep
26th	Frank C. Byers	Rep	Frank C. Byers	Rep
27th	Paul E. McCarville	Rep	Henry Emil Heideman	Rep
28th	Warren Eldon Walter	Rep	Warren Eldon Walter	Rep
31st	John R. Hattery	Rep	Janious G. Lucas	Rep
32nd	Charles S. Van Eaton	Rep	Charles S. Van Eaton	Rep
33rd	Donald Alexander Risk	Rep	Donald Alexander Risk	Rep
36th	Fern Eugene Sharp	Rep	Art J. Johnson	Rep
39th	J. Kendall Lynes	Rep	J. Kendall Lynes	Rep
40th	Arthur H. Jacobson	Rep	George Lindsey Scott	Rep
41st	Leo Elthon	Rep	Jacob Grimstead	Rep
43rd	Herman M. Knudson	Rep	Herman M. Knudson	Rep
46th	Edward S. Parker	Rep	Laurence M. Boothby	Rep
47th	Harry E. Watson	Rep	Harry E. Watson	Rep
49th	Burl Nelson Ridout	Dem	Duane E. Dewel	Rep

== Detailed Results ==
- NOTE: The 20 districts that did not hold elections in 1952 are not listed here.
- Note: If a district does not list a primary, then that district did not have a competitive primary (i.e., there may have only been one candidate file for that district).

=== District 2 ===
Iowa Senate, District 2 Republican Primary Election, 1952
Party	Candidate	Votes	%
Republican	Charles W. Nelson	1,988	41.3
Republican	Walter E. Williams	1,450	30.2
Republican	Roy W. Hinson	1,373	28.5
Total votes		4,811	100.0

Iowa Senate, District 2 General Election, 1952
Party	Candidate	Votes	%
Republican	Charles W. Nelson	9,360	100.0
Total votes		9,360	100.0
Republican hold			

=== District 3 ===
Iowa Senate, District 3 General Election, 1952
Party	Candidate	Votes	%
Republican	Ted D. Clark	8,049	54.7
Democratic	Sherman West (incumbent)	6,655	45.3
Total votes		14,704	100.0
Republican gain from Democratic			

=== District 4 ===
Iowa Senate, District 4 General Election, 1952
Party	Candidate	Votes	%
Republican	W. C. Stuart	8,059	100.0
Total votes		8,059	100.0
Republican hold			

=== District 5 ===
Iowa Senate, District 5 Republican Primary Election, 1952
Party	Candidate	Votes	%
Republican	X. T. Prentis (incumbent)	3,298	52.5
Republican	John E. Young	2,985	47.5
Total votes		6,283	100.0

Iowa Senate, District 5 General Election, 1952
Party	Candidate	Votes	%
Republican	X. T. Prentis (incumbent)	12,638	100.0
Total votes		12,638	100.0
Republican hold			

=== District 6 ===
Iowa Senate, District 6 Republican Primary Election, 1952
Party	Candidate	Votes	%
Republican	Thomas C. Larson	2,065	Unreported
Republican	Ralph C. Jones	Unreported	Unreported
Total votes		Unreported	100.0

Iowa Senate, District 6 General Election, 1952
Party	Candidate	Votes	%
Republican	Thomas C. Larson	7,457	100.0
Total votes		7,457	100.0
Republican hold			

=== District 8 ===
Iowa Senate, District 8 General Election, 1952
Party	Candidate	Votes	%
Republican	Henry W. Washburn	9,445	70.5
Democratic	Herbert R. Patterson	3,950	29.5
Total votes		13,395	100.0
Republican hold			

=== District 11 ===
Iowa Senate, District 11 Republican Primary Election, 1952
Party	Candidate	Votes	%
Republican	G. D. Bellman	2,995	58.3
Republican	Fred Stiffler	2,145	41.7
Total votes		5,140	100.0

Iowa Senate, District 11 General Election, 1952
Party	Candidate	Votes	%
Republican	G. D. Bellman	9,030	100.0
Total votes		9,030	100.0
Republican hold			

=== District 14 ===
Iowa Senate, District 14 General Election, 1952
Party	Candidate	Votes	%
Republican	C. Emory Stewart	6,036	56.1
Democratic	A. E. Augustine (incumbent)	4,721	43.9
Total votes		10,757	100.0
Republican gain from Democratic			

=== District 15 ===
Iowa Senate, District 15 Republican Primary Election, 1952
Party	Candidate	Votes	%
Republican	A. M. Wilson	1,602	55.6
Republican	C. R. Sandifer	1,279	44.4
Total votes		2,881	100.0

Iowa Senate, District 15 Democratic Primary Election, 1952
Party	Candidate	Votes	%
Democratic	Leon N. Miller	959	52.9
Democratic	Frank L. Bell	853	47.1
Total votes		1,812	100.0

Iowa Senate, District 15 General Election, 1952
Party	Candidate	Votes	%
Democratic	Leon N. Miller	9,415	54.1
Republican	A. M. Wilson	7,999	45.9
Total votes		17,414	100.0
Democratic hold			

=== District 16 ===
Iowa Senate, District 16 General Election, 1952
Party	Candidate	Votes	%
Republican	Lorin B. Sayre	7,214	52.9
Democratic	Raymond R. Gillespie (incumbent)	6,429	47.1
Total votes		13,643	100.0
Republican gain from Democratic			

=== District 17 ===
Iowa Senate, District 17 Republican Primary Election, 1952
Party	Candidate	Votes	%
Republican	G. E. Whitehead (incumbent)	3,760	58.1
Republican	Raymond L. Pollock	2,712	41.9
Total votes		6,472	100.0

Iowa Senate, District 17 General Election, 1952
Party	Candidate	Votes	%
Republican	G. E. Whitehead (incumbent)	16,022	100.0
Total votes		16,022	100.0
Republican hold			

=== District 19 ===
Iowa Senate, District 19 General Election, 1952
Party	Candidate	Votes	%
Republican	DeVere Watson (incumbent)	17,815	59.5
Democratic	James F. Leslie	12,126	40.5
Total votes		29,941	100.0
Republican hold			

=== District 22 ===
Iowa Senate, District 22 Republican Primary Election, 1952
Party	Candidate	Votes	%
Republican	Erwin Schoening	1,908	50.1
Republican	Leo P. McEleney	1,897	49.9
Total votes		3,805	100.0

Iowa Senate, District 22 General Election, 1952
Party	Candidate	Votes	%
Republican	Erwin Schoening	14,642	64.7
Democratic	John M. Yackshaw	7,994	35.3
Total votes		22,636	100.0
Republican hold			

=== District 23 ===
Iowa Senate, District 23 Republican Primary Election, 1952
Party	Candidate	Votes	%
Republican	Earl Elijah	2,883	43.2
Republican	D. A. Donohue	1,959	29.4
Republican	Willard Ingalls	1,827	27.4
Total votes		6,669	100.0

Iowa Senate, District 23 General Election, 1952
Party	Candidate	Votes	%
Republican	Earl Elijah	17,101	100.0
Total votes		17,101	100.0
Republican hold			

=== District 24 ===
Iowa Senate, District 24 General Election, 1952
Party	Candidate	Votes	%
Republican	J. T. Dykhouse (incumbent)	17,732	100.0
Total votes		17,732	100.0
Republican hold			

=== District 25 ===
Iowa Senate, District 25 General Election, 1952
Party	Candidate	Votes	%
Republican	D. C. Nolan	13,906	54.8
Democratic	Leroy S. Mercer (incumbent)	11,472	45.2
Total votes		25,378	100.0
Republican gain from Democratic			

=== District 26 ===
Iowa Senate, District 26 General Election, 1952
Party	Candidate	Votes	%
Republican	Frank C. Byers (incumbent)	29,481	57.3
Democratic	L. M. Hullinger	21,941	42.7
Total votes		51,422	100.0
Republican hold			

=== District 27 ===
Iowa Senate, District 27 Republican Primary Election, 1952
Party	Candidate	Votes	%
Republican	Henry Heideman	6,210	68.4
Republican	Paul E. McCarville (incumbent)	2,864	31.6
Total votes		9,074	100.0

Iowa Senate, District 27 General Election, 1952
Party	Candidate	Votes	%
Republican	Henry Heideman	14,611	56.3
Democratic	C. Joseph Coleman	11,340	43.7
Total votes		25,951	100.0
Republican hold			

=== District 28 ===
Iowa Senate, District 28 Republican Primary Election, 1952
Party	Candidate	Votes	%
Republican	W. Eldon Walter (incumbent)	2,478	57.5
Republican	John Knudson	1,829	42.5
Total votes		4,307	100.0

Iowa Senate, District 28 General Election, 1952
Party	Candidate	Votes	%
Republican	W. Eldon Walter (incumbent)	10,947	100.0
Total votes		10,947	100.0
Republican hold			

=== District 31 ===
Iowa Senate, District 31 Republican Primary Election, 1952
Party	Candidate	Votes	%
Republican	J. G. Lucas	6,598	64.0
Republican	Clifford N. Nystrom	3,708	36.0
Total votes		10,306	100.0

Iowa Senate, District 31 General Election, 1952
Party	Candidate	Votes	%
Republican	J. G. Lucas	16,892	58.4
Democratic	Ray Eveland	12,043	41.6
Total votes		28,935	100.0
Republican hold			

=== District 32 ===
Iowa Senate, District 32 General Election, 1952
Party	Candidate	Votes	%
Republican	Charles S. Van Eaton (incumbent)	24,864	55.3
Democratic	Emlin L. Bergeson	20,092	44.7
Total votes		44,956	100.0
Republican hold			

=== District 33 ===
Iowa Senate, District 33 General Election, 1952
Party	Candidate	Votes	%
Republican	Don Risk (incumbent)	11,361	66.2
Democratic	James C. Cloud	5,792	33.8
Total votes		17,153	100.0
Republican hold			

=== District 36 ===
Iowa Senate, District 36 Republican Primary Election, 1952
Party	Candidate	Votes	%
Republican	A. J. Johnson	1,702	54.6
Republican	Melvin Beimfohr	1,416	45.4
Total votes		3,118	100.0

Iowa Senate, District 36 General Election, 1952
Party	Candidate	Votes	%
Republican	A. J. Johnson	5,637	52.1
Democratic	Adolph Elvers	5,189	47.9
Total votes		10,826	100.0
Republican hold			

=== District 39 ===
Iowa Senate, District 39 Republican Primary Election, 1952
Party	Candidate	Votes	%
Republican	J. Kendall Lynes (incumbent)	3,684	63.1
Republican	Roger Jennings	2,153	36.9
Total votes		5,837	100.0

Iowa Senate, District 39 General Election, 1952
Party	Candidate	Votes	%
Republican	J. Kendall Lynes (incumbent)	11,252	69.5
Democratic	Mrs. Marie Buss	4,927	30.5
Total votes		16,179	100.0
Republican hold			

=== District 40 ===
Iowa Senate, District 40 Republican Primary Election, 1952
Party	Candidate	Votes	%
Republican	George L. Scott	2,774	40.8
Republican	J. C. Davis	2,140	31.5
Republican	L. C. Surfus	1,882	27.7
Total votes		6,796	100.0

Iowa Senate, District 40 General Election, 1952
Party	Candidate	Votes	%
Republican	George L. Scott	13,299	64.0
Democratic	Mrs. Doris Gorman	7,485	36.0
Total votes		20,784	100.0
Republican hold			

=== District 41 ===
Iowa Senate, District 41 Republican Primary Election, 1952
Party	Candidate	Votes	%
Republican	Jacob Grimstead	3,503	48.0
Republican	Allert G. Olson	2,263	31.0
Republican	A. T. Brookins	1,538	21.0
Total votes		7,304	100.0

Iowa Senate, District 41 General Election, 1952
Party	Candidate	Votes	%
Republican	Jacob Grimstead	12,935	100.0
Total votes		12,935	100.0
Republican hold			

=== District 43 ===
Iowa Senate, District 43 Republican Primary Election, 1952
Party	Candidate	Votes	%
Republican	Herman M. Knudson (incumbent)	6,116	60.7
Republican	Al K. Carstens	3,963	39.3
Total votes		10,079	100.0

Iowa Senate, District 43 General Election, 1952
Party	Candidate	Votes	%
Republican	H. M. Knudson (incumbent)	20,965	61.5
Democratic	Dorothy Dunn	13,101	38.5
Total votes		34,066	100.0
Republican hold			

=== District 46 ===
Iowa Senate, District 46 General Election, 1952
Party	Candidate	Votes	%
Republican	Laurence M. Boothby	16,548	100.0
Total votes		16,548	100.0
Republican hold			

=== District 47 ===
Iowa Senate, District 47 General Election, 1952
Party	Candidate	Votes	%
Republican	Harry E. Watson (incumbent)	14,083	66.7
Democratic	W. A. Yager	7,045	33.3
Total votes		21,128	100.0
Republican hold			

=== District 49 ===
Iowa Senate, District 49 General Election, 1952
Party	Candidate	Votes	%
Republican	Duane E. Dewel	14,755	62.2
Democratic	Burl N. Ridout (incumbent)	8,970	37.8
Total votes		23,725	100.0
Republican gain from Democratic			

== See also ==
- United States elections, 1952
- United States House of Representatives elections in Iowa, 1952
- Elections in Iowa
