= 1944 Iowa Senate election =

- November 7, 1944

30 out of 50 seats in the Iowa State Senate 26 seats needed for a majority
	Majority party	Minority party
Party	Republican	Democratic
Last election	45	5
Seats after	45	5
Seat change	Steady	Steady

The 1944 Iowa State Senate elections took place as part of the biennial 1944 United States elections. Iowa voters elected state senators in 30 of the state senate's 50 districts. State senators serve four-year terms in the Iowa State Senate.

The Iowa General Assembly provides statewide maps of each district. To compare the effect of the 1944 redistricting process on the location of each district, contrast the previous map with the map used for 1944 elections.

The primary election on June 5, 1944, determined which candidates appeared on the November 7, 1944 general election ballot.

Following the previous election, Republicans had control of the Iowa state Senate with 45 seats to Democrats' 5 seats.

To claim control of the chamber from Republicans, the Democrats needed to net 21 Senate seats.

Republicans maintained control of the Iowa State Senate following the 1944 general election with the balance of power remaining unchanged with Republicans holding 45 seats and Democrats having 5 seats.

== Summary of Results ==
- Note: The 20 holdover Senators not up for re-election are not listed on this table.

State Senate District	Incumbent	Party	Elected Senator	Party
2nd	Charles W. Wade	Rep	Alden Loring Doud	Rep
3rd	Dewey Emmitt Goode	Rep	James Robert Barkley	Rep
4th	Clarence L. Clark	Rep	James Alonzo Newsome	Rep
5th	T. M. Thompson	Rep	Roy B. Hawkins	Rep
6th	William Oliver Turner	Rep	Ole John Kirketeg	Rep
8th	Kenneth A. Evans	Rep	Oscar N. Hultman	Rep
11th	Floyd Arden Jones	Rep	Floyd Arden Jones	Rep
14th	Albert Earl Augustine	Dem	Albert Earl Augustine	Dem
15th	Hugh W. Lundy	Rep	Tunis H. Klein	Dem
16th	Harry Samuel Love	Rep	Harry Samuel Love	Rep
17th	Ai Miller	Rep	Ai Miller	Rep
18th	Frank Pelzer	Rep	Edward Speer White	Rep
19th	De Vere Watson	Rep	De Vere Watson	Rep
23rd	DuFay D. Fuller	Rep	Edwin Charles Schluter (Note: Incumbent redistricted from district 24 to 23.)	Rep
24th	Edwin Charles Schluter	Rep	Jans T. "J. T." Dykhouse (Note: Incumbent redistricted from district 49 to 24.)	Rep
25th	Leroy Samuel Mercer	Dem	Leroy Samuel Mercer	Dem
26th	Frank C. Byers	Rep	Frank C. Byers	Rep
27th	Charles V. Findlay	Rep	Charles V. Findlay	Rep
28th	Benjamin Chase Whitehill	Rep	Robert A. Rockhill	Rep
31st	John R. Hattery	Rep	Janious G. Lucas	Rep
32nd	Adrian D. Clem	Rep	Adrian D. Clem	Rep
33rd	Irving D. Long	Rep	Irving D. Long	Rep
36th	Gerald W. Hunt	Rep	Fern Eugene Sharp	Rep
39th	J. Kendall Lynes	Rep	J. Kendall Lynes	Rep
40th	Paul Palmer Stewart	Rep	Arthur H. Jacobson	Rep
41st	Leo Elthon	Rep	Leo Elthon	Rep
43rd	Oscar E. Johnson	Dem	Herman M. Knudson	Rep
46th	Raymond Edward Hess	Rep	Frederick James Ritchie	Rep
47th	Robert Keir	Rep	Robert Keir	Rep
49th	Jans T. "J. T." Dykhouse	Rep	Duane E. Dewel	Rep

== Detailed Results ==
- NOTE: The 20 districts that did not hold elections in 1944 are not listed here.
- Note: If a district does not list a primary, then that district did not have a competitive primary (i.e., there may have only been one candidate file for that district).

=== District 2 ===
Iowa Senate, District 2 General Election, 1944
Party	Candidate	Votes	%
Republican	Alden L. Doud	7,816	100.0
Total votes		7,816	100.0
Republican hold			

=== District 3 ===
Iowa Senate, District 3 Republican Primary Election, 1944
Party	Candidate	Votes	%
Republican	J. R. Barkley	1,311	50.5
Republican	Dewey E. Goode (incumbent)	1,287	49.5
Total votes		2,598	100.0

Iowa Senate, District 3 General Election, 1944
Party	Candidate	Votes	%
Republican	J. R. Barkley	7,553	52.6
Democratic	Howard D. Evans	6,812	47.4
Total votes		14,365	100.0
Republican hold			

=== District 4 ===
Iowa Senate, District 4 Democratic Primary Election, 1944
Party	Candidate	Votes	%
Democratic	Arch J. Jones	356	62.2
Democratic	Clell Whitlatch	216	37.8
Total votes		572	100.0

Iowa Senate, District 4 General Election, 1944
Party	Candidate	Votes	%
Republican	J. A. Newsome	6,349	56.5
Democratic	Arch J. Jones	4,893	43.5
Total votes		11,242	100.0
Republican hold			

=== District 5 ===
Iowa Senate, District 5 General Election, 1944
Party	Candidate	Votes	%
Republican	R. B. Hawkins	10,716	62.7
Democratic	Justus B. Fudge	6,375	37.3
Total votes		17,091	100.0
Republican hold			

=== District 6 ===
Iowa Senate, District 6 General Election, 1944
Party	Candidate	Votes	%
Republican	O. J. Kirketeg	6,602	65.7
Democratic	C. S. Hook	3,445	34.3
Total votes		10,047	100.0
Republican hold			

=== District 8 ===
Iowa Senate, District 8 General Election, 1944
Party	Candidate	Votes	%
Republican	O. N. Hultman	7,826	100.0
Total votes		7,826	100.0
Republican hold			

=== District 11 ===
Iowa Senate, District 11 General Election, 1944
Party	Candidate	Votes	%
Republican	Floyd Jones (incumbent)	7,242	100.0
Total votes		7,242	100.0
Republican hold			

=== District 14 ===
Iowa Senate, District 14 Republican Primary Election, 1944
Party	Candidate	Votes	%
Republican	Homer G. Deck	700	56.2
Republican	George Draper	545	43.8
Total votes		1,245	100.0

Iowa Senate, District 14 General Election, 1944
Party	Candidate	Votes	%
Democratic	A. E. (Earl) Augustine (incumbent)	4,558	50.8
Republican	Homer G. Deck	4,421	49.2
Total votes		8,979	100.0
Democratic hold			

=== District 15 ===
Iowa Senate, District 15 Republican Primary Election, 1944
Party	Candidate	Votes	%
Republican	L. D. Teter	1,630	56.0
Republican	Joe Templeton	1,279	44.0
Total votes		2,909	100.0

Iowa Senate, District 15 General Election, 1944
Party	Candidate	Votes	%
Democratic	Tunis H. Klein	8,102	50.7
Republican	L. D. Teter	7,881	49.3
Total votes		15,983	100.0
Democratic gain from Republican			

=== District 16 ===
Iowa Senate, District 16 General Election, 1944
Party	Candidate	Votes	%
Republican	H. Sam Love (incumbent)	7,480	100.0
Total votes		7,480	100.0
Republican hold			

=== District 17 ===
Iowa Senate, District 17 General Election, 1944
Party	Candidate	Votes	%
Republican	Ai Miller (incumbent)	13,009	100.0
Total votes		13,009	100.0
Republican hold			

=== District 18 ===
Iowa Senate, District 18 General Election, 1944
Party	Candidate	Votes	%
Republican	Ed S. White	9,567	65.8
Democratic	Mrs. Pearl Sherwood	4,977	34.2
Total votes		14,544	100.0
Republican hold			

=== District 19 ===
Iowa Senate, District 19 General Election, 1944
Party	Candidate	Votes	%
Republican	De Vere Watson (incumbent)	14,735	100.0
Total votes		14,735	100.0
Republican hold			

=== District 23 ===
Iowa Senate, District 23 General Election, 1944
Party	Candidate	Votes	%
Republican	Edwin C. Schluter (incumbent)	13,282	100.0
Total votes		13,282	100.0
Republican hold			

=== District 24 ===
Iowa Senate, District 24 General Election, 1944
Party	Candidate	Votes	%
Republican	J. T. Dykhouse (incumbent)	12,301	100.0
Total votes		12,301	100.0
Republican hold			

=== District 25 ===
Iowa Senate, District 25 Republican Primary Election, 1944
Party	Candidate	Votes	%
Republican	D. C. Nolan	1,677	53.7
Republican	Frederick C. Schadt	1,448	46.3
Total votes		3,125	100.0

Iowa Senate, District 25 General Election, 1944
Party	Candidate	Votes	%
Democratic	Leroy S. Mercer (incumbent)	10,201	50.5
Republican	D. C. Nolan	9,989	49.5
Total votes		20,190	100.0
Democratic hold			

=== District 26 ===
Iowa Senate, District 26 General Election, 1944
Party	Candidate	Votes	%
Republican	Frank C. Byers (incumbent)	21,743	52.8
Democratic	Charles W. Hobbie	19,475	47.2
Total votes		41,218	100.0
Republican hold			

=== District 27 ===
Iowa Senate, District 27 Republican Primary Election, 1944
Party	Candidate	Votes	%
Republican	C. V. Findlay (incumbent)	1,923	56.8
Republican	Melvin Wilson	1,460	43.2
Total votes		3,383	100.0

Iowa Senate, District 27 General Election, 1944
Party	Candidate	Votes	%
Republican	C. V. Findlay (incumbent)	10,838	53.6
Democratic	James F. Stanek	9,389	46.4
Total votes		20,227	100.0
Republican hold			

=== District 28 ===
Iowa Senate, District 28 General Election, 1944
Party	Candidate	Votes	%
Republican	B. C. Whitehill (incumbent)	7,779	66.6
Democratic	H. L. Vauthrin	3,907	33.4
Total votes		11,686	100.0
Republican hold			

- Senator Whitehill died in January 1945, which necessitated a special election to fill his seat.

Iowa Senate, District 28 Special Election, January 26, 1945
Party	Candidate	Votes	%
Republican	Robert A. Rockhill	1,783	72.9
Democratic	C. E. Wicklund	663	27.1
Total votes		2,446	100.0
Republican hold			

=== District 31 ===
Iowa Senate, District 31 General Election, 1944
Party	Candidate	Votes	%
Republican	J. G. Lucas	13,029	100.0
Total votes		13,029	100.0
Republican hold			

=== District 32 ===
Iowa Senate, District 32 General Election, 1944
Party	Candidate	Votes	%
Republican	A. D. Clem (incumbent)	19,255	53.8
Democratic	James W. McCoun	16,531	46.2
Total votes		35,786	100.0
Republican hold			

=== District 33 ===
Iowa Senate, District 33 General Election, 1944
Party	Candidate	Votes	%
Republican	Irving D. Long (incumbent)	10,181	100.0
Total votes		10,181	100.0
Republican hold			

=== District 36 ===
Iowa Senate, District 36 Republican Primary Election, 1944
Party	Candidate	Votes	%
Republican	F. E. Sharp	1,030	55.1
Republican	C. A. Benson	841	44.9
Total votes		1,871	100.0

Iowa Senate, District 36 General Election, 1944
Party	Candidate	Votes	%
Republican	F. E. Sharp	5,496	56.5
Democratic	C. L. Crider	4,238	43.5
Total votes		9,734	100.0
Republican hold			

=== District 39 ===
Iowa Senate, District 39 General Election, 1944
Party	Candidate	Votes	%
Republican	J. Kendall Lynes (incumbent)	9,054	100.0
Total votes		9,054	100.0
Republican hold			

=== District 40 ===
Iowa Senate, District 40 Republican Primary Election, 1944
Party	Candidate	Votes	%
Republican	Arthur H. Jacobson	2,409	61.9
Republican	Elmer Pieper	1,485	38.1
Total votes		3,894	100.0

Iowa Senate, District 40 General Election, 1944
Party	Candidate	Votes	%
Republican	Arthur H. Jacobson	11,869	63.2
Democratic	T. W. Mullaney	6,910	36.8
Total votes		18,779	100.0
Republican hold			

=== District 41 ===
Iowa Senate, District 41 Republican Primary Election, 1944
Party	Candidate	Votes	%
Republican	Leo Elthon (incumbent)	1,861	53.7
Republican	Jacob Grimstead	1,607	46.3
Total votes		3,468	100.0

Iowa Senate, District 41 General Election, 1944
Party	Candidate	Votes	%
Republican	Leo Elthon (incumbent)	9,277	100.0
Total votes		9,277	100.0
Republican hold			

=== District 43 ===
Iowa Senate, District 43 General Election, 1944
Party	Candidate	Votes	%
Republican	Herman M. Knudson	14,929	53.9
Democratic	Fred J. Paullus	12,766	46.1
Total votes		27,695	100.0
Republican gain from Democratic			

=== District 46 ===
Iowa Senate, District 46 Republican Primary Election, 1944
Party	Candidate	Votes	%
Republican	Fred J. Ritchie	1,772	51.8
Republican	R. E. Hess (incumbent)	1,651	48.2
Total votes		3,423	100.0

Iowa Senate, District 46 General Election, 1944
Party	Candidate	Votes	%
Republican	Fred J. Ritchie	11,704	63.1
Democratic	Winfred Mighell	6,857	36.9
Total votes		18,561	100.0
Republican hold			

=== District 47 ===
Iowa Senate, District 47 General Election, 1944
Party	Candidate	Votes	%
Republican	Robert Keir (incumbent)	8,987	54.8
Democratic	W. A. Yager	7,403	45.2
Total votes		16,390	100.0
Republican hold			

=== District 49 ===
Iowa Senate, District 49 General Election, 1944
Party	Candidate	Votes	%
Republican	Duane E. Dewel	9,981	50.5
Democratic	Casey Loss	9,797	49.5
Total votes		19,778	100.0
Republican hold			

== See also ==
- United States elections, 1944
- United States House of Representatives elections in Iowa, 1944
- Elections in Iowa
