= 1936 Iowa Senate election =

- November 3, 1936

32 out of 50 seats in the Iowa State Senate 26 seats needed for a majority
	Majority party	Minority party
Party	Republican	Democratic
Last election	22	28
Seats before	24 (Note: During the 46th General Assembly of the Iowa State Senate (Jan. 1935 through Jan. 1937), there were numerous vacancies and special elections. In district 3, Democratic Senator John K. Valentine was succeeded by Democrat Hugh Guernsey following a special election (a hold of the district for Democrats). In district 5, Democratic Senator Frank M. Stevens was succeeded by Republican Howard W. Edwards following a special election (a gain of the district for Republicans). In district 14, Democratic Senator Louis Tuttle Shangle was succeeded by Democrat Albert Earl Augustine following a special election (a hold of the district for Democrats). In district 18, Democratic Senator Charles E. Malone was succeeded by Republican Frank Pelzer following a special election (a gain of the district for Republicans). In district 28, Democratic Senator Chris Reese was succeeded by Republican Benjamin Chase Whitehill following a special election (a gain of the district for Republicans). In district 30, Republican Senator George A. Wilson was succeeded by Democrat James J. Gillespie (a gain of the district for Democrats). In district 37, Republican Senator Irving H. Knudson was succeeded by Republican George Raymond Hill following a special election (a hold of the district for Republicans). Given these changes, by election day in 1936 Democrats had seen their seats fall from 28 to 26 and Republicans had seen their seats rise from 22 to 24 since the start of the 46th General Assembly.)	26
Seats after	28	22
Seat change	▲4	▼4
- Results; Democratic gain Republican gain Democratic hold Republican hold

The 1936 Iowa State Senate elections took place as part of the biennial 1936 United States elections. Iowa voters elected state senators in 32 of the state senate's 50 districts. State senators serve four-year terms in the Iowa State Senate.

A statewide map of the 50 state Senate districts in the 1936 elections is provided by the Iowa General Assembly here.

The primary election on June 1, 1936, determined which candidates appeared on the November 3, 1936 general election ballot.

Following the previous election, Democrats had control of the Iowa state Senate with 28 seats to Republicans' 22 seats. Due to some vacancies and special elections, by election day 1936, Democrats held 26 seats to Republicans' 24.

To claim control of the chamber from Democrats, the Republicans needed to net 2 Senate seats.

Republicans gained control of the Iowa State Senate following the 1936 general election with the balance of power shifting to Republicans holding 28 seats and Democrats having 22 seats (a net gain of 4 seats for Republicans).

== Summary of Results ==
- Note: The 18 holdover Senators not up for re-election are not listed on this table.

State Senate District	Incumbent	Party	Elected Senator	Party
2nd	John N. Calhoun	Rep	Sanford Zeigler	Rep
3rd	Hugh G. Guernsey	Dem	Hugh G. Guernsey	Dem
4th	Joseph E. Doze	Dem	Harold V. Levis	Rep
5th	Howard W. Edwards	Rep	Howard W. Edwards	Rep
6th	Claude Stanley	Rep	Ole John Kirketeg	Rep
8th	Homer Hush	Rep	Kenneth A. Evans	Rep
11th	William S. Beardsley	Rep	William S. Beardsley	Rep
14th	Albert Earl Augustine	Dem	Albert Earl Augustine	Dem
15th	Carl F. Aschenbrenner	Dem	Hugh W. Lundy	Rep
16th	Ora E. Husted	Rep	Ora E. Husted	Rep
17th	George M. Hopkins	Rep	George M. Hopkins	Rep
18th	Frank Pelzer	Rep	Frank Pelzer	Rep
19th	Morris W. Moore	Dem	Morris W. Moore	Dem
23rd	Carolyn Campbell Pendray (Note: Senator Pendray was the first woman elected to the Iowa General Assembly.)	Dem	Frank E. Ellis	Dem
24th	Henry Delbert Miller	Dem	Henry Delbert Miller	Dem
25th	Paul W. Schmidt	Dem	Frederick Conrad Schadt	Rep
26th	Frank C. Byers	Rep	Frank C. Byers	Rep
27th	Paul H. Anderson	Dem	Edward Joseph Breen	Dem
28th	Benjamin Chase Whitehill	Rep	Benjamin Chase Whitehill	Rep
30th	James J. Gillespie	Dem	James J. Gillespie	Dem
31st	Fred William Nelson	Rep	Lant H. Doran	Rep
32nd	Vincent F. Harrington	Dem	Tom Ellis Murray	Dem
33rd	George L. Parker	Rep	George L. Parker	Rep
36th	Martin X. Geske	Dem	Martin X. Geske	Dem
37th	George Raymond Hill	Rep	George Raymond Hill	Rep
39th	Louis H. Meyer	Dem	Clermont Colfax Smith	Rep
40th	Thomas William Mullaney	Dem	Paul Palmer Stewart	Rep
41st	Leo Elthon	Rep	Leo Elthon	Rep
43rd	William C. McArthur	Dem	Earl M. Dean	Dem
46th	Mike G. Fisch	Dem	Winfred Mighell	Dem
47th	George William Patterson	Rep	Lester S. Gillette	Dem
49th	Garritt E. Roelofs	Rep	Charles Bernard Hoeven	Rep

== Detailed Results ==
- NOTE: The 18 districts that did not hold elections in 1936 are not listed here.
- Note: If a district does not list a primary, then that district did not have a competitive primary (i.e., there may have only been one candidate file for that district).

=== District 2 ===
Iowa Senate, District 2 Republican Primary Election, 1936
Party	Candidate	Votes	%
Republican	Sanford Zeigler, Jr.	2,394	60.2
Republican	Fulton	1,586	39.8
Total votes		3,980	100.0

Iowa Senate, District 2 General Election, 1936
Party	Candidate	Votes	%
Republican	Sanford Zeigler, Jr.	7,857	58.6
Democratic	J. Wilbur Dole	5,560	41.4
Total votes		13,417	100.0
Republican hold			

=== District 3 ===
Iowa Senate, District 3 Democratic Primary Election, 1936
Party	Candidate	Votes	%
Democratic	Hugh G. Guernsey (incumbent)	1,961	57.4
Democratic	Schlegel	1,454	42.6
Total votes		3,415	100.0

Iowa Senate, District 3 General Election, 1936
Party	Candidate	Votes	%
Democratic	Hugh G. Guernsey (incumbent)	9,706	56.1
Republican	Purley Rinker	7,588	43.9
Total votes		17,294	100.0
Democratic hold			

=== District 4 ===
Iowa Senate, District 4 Republican Primary Election, 1936
Party	Candidate	Votes	%
Republican	H. V. Levis	2,737	61.6
Republican	Johnston	1,708	38.4
Total votes		4,445	100.0

Iowa Senate, District 4 General Election, 1936
Party	Candidate	Votes	%
Republican	H. V. Levis	7,616	55.3
Democratic	Francis B. Ryan	6,148	44.7
Total votes		13,764	100.0
Republican gain from Democratic			

=== District 5 ===
Iowa Senate, District 5 Republican Primary Election, 1936
Party	Candidate	Votes	%
Republican	H. W. Edwards (incumbent)	4,036	63.1
Republican	Vaughn	2,360	36.9
Total votes		6,396	100.0

Iowa Senate, District 5 Democratic Primary Election, 1936
Party	Candidate	Votes	%
Democratic	John Irving, Jr.	1,485	62.4
Democratic	Jackson	894	37.6
Total votes		2,379	100.0

Iowa Senate, District 5 General Election, 1936
Party	Candidate	Votes	%
Republican	H. W. Edwards (incumbent)	10,682	51.0
Democratic	John Irving, Jr.	10,272	49.0
Total votes		20,954	100.0
Republican hold			

=== District 6 ===
Iowa Senate, District 6 Republican Primary Election, 1936
Party	Candidate	Votes	%
Republican	O. J. Kirketeg	2,802	63.1
Republican	Cox	1,640	36.9
Total votes		4,442	100.0

Iowa Senate, District 6 General Election, 1936
Party	Candidate	Votes	%
Republican	O. J. Kirketeg	7,161	59.0
Democratic	Charles S. Hook	4,974	41.0
Total votes		12,135	100.0
Republican hold			

=== District 8 ===
Iowa Senate, District 8 General Election, 1936
Party	Candidate	Votes	%
Republican	K. A. Evans	7,543	51.5
Democratic	Fred W. Kenworthy	7,099	48.5
Total votes		14,642	100.0
Republican hold			

=== District 11 ===
Iowa Senate, District 11 General Election, 1936
Party	Candidate	Votes	%
Republican	William S. Beardsley (incumbent)	8,127	60.7
Democratic	M. R. Stansell	5,256	39.3
Total votes		13,383	100.0
Republican hold			

=== District 14 ===
Iowa Senate, District 14 Republican Primary Election, 1936
Party	Candidate	Votes	%
Republican	John H. Taylor	1,228	52.0
Republican	Jones	1,135	48.0
Total votes		2,363	100.0

Iowa Senate, District 14 Democratic Primary Election, 1936
Party	Candidate	Votes	%
Democratic	A. E. Augustine (incumbent)	603	55.9
Democratic	Smith	475	44.1
Total votes		1,078	100.0

Iowa Senate, District 14 General Election, 1936
Party	Candidate	Votes	%
Democratic	A. E. Augustine (incumbent)	5,531	53.5
Republican	John H. Taylor	4,805	46.5
Total votes		10,336	100.0
Democratic hold			

=== District 15 ===
Iowa Senate, District 15 General Election, 1936
Party	Candidate	Votes	%
Republican	Hugh W. Lundy	9,162	50.8
Democratic	F. M. Roberts	8,891	49.2
Total votes		18,053	100.0
Republican gain from Democratic			

=== District 16 ===
Iowa Senate, District 16 Democratic Primary Election, 1936
Party	Candidate	Votes	%
Democratic	Fred C. Armstrong	589	53.5
Democratic	Sawyer	511	46.5
Total votes		1,100	100.0

Iowa Senate, District 16 General Election, 1936
Party	Candidate	Votes	%
Republican	Ora E. Husted (incumbent)	7,082	52.9
Democratic	Fred C. Armstrong	6,304	47.1
Total votes		13,386	100.0
Republican hold			

=== District 17 ===
Iowa Senate, District 17 Republican Primary Election, 1936
Party	Candidate	Votes	%
Republican	George M. Hopkins (incumbent)	3,226	51.6
Republican	Kerberg	1,557	24.9
Republican	Beveridge	1,469	23.5
Total votes		6,252	100.0

Iowa Senate, District 17 Democratic Primary Election, 1936
Party	Candidate	Votes	%
Democratic	H. E. Cornish	1,289	51.5
Democratic	Regan	1,214	48.5
Total votes		2,503	100.0

Iowa Senate, District 17 General Election, 1936
Party	Candidate	Votes	%
Republican	George M. Hopkins (incumbent)	12,201	51.2
Democratic	H. E. Cornish	11,227	47.2
Farmer–Labor	Anton M. Christensen	379	1.6
Total votes		23,807	100.0
Republican hold			

=== District 18 ===
Iowa Senate, District 18 Republican Primary Election, 1936
Party	Candidate	Votes	%
Republican	Frank Pelzer (incumbent)	2,100	56.7
Republican	Holton	1,602	43.3
Total votes		3,702	100.0

Iowa Senate, District 18 Democratic Primary Election, 1936
Party	Candidate	Votes	%
Democratic	Russell Swift	1,552	55.1
Democratic	Frederickson	1,265	44.9
Total votes		2,817	100.0

Iowa Senate, District 18 General Election, 1936
Party	Candidate	Votes	%
Republican	Frank Pelzer (incumbent)	9,674	55.6
Democratic	Russell Swift	7,738	44.4
Total votes		17,412	100.0
Republican hold			

=== District 19 ===
Iowa Senate, District 19 Democratic Primary Election, 1936
Party	Candidate	Votes	%
Democratic	Morris Moore (incumbent)	1,466	51.7
Democratic	Green	1,370	48.3
Total votes		2,836	100.0

Iowa Senate, District 19 General Election, 1936
Party	Candidate	Votes	%
Democratic	Morris Moore (incumbent)	14,867	53.8
Republican	De Vere Watson	12,765	46.2
Total votes		27,632	100.0
Democratic hold			

=== District 23 ===
Iowa Senate, District 23 Democratic Primary Election, 1936
Party	Candidate	Votes	%
Democratic	Frank E. Ellis	936	50.5
Democratic	Ristine	918	49.5
Total votes		1,854	100.0

Iowa Senate, District 23 General Election, 1936
Party	Candidate	Votes	%
Democratic	Frank E. Ellis	4,498	56.0
Republican	O. H. Kelly	3,531	44.0
Total votes		8,029	100.0
Democratic hold			

=== District 24 ===
Iowa Senate, District 24 Republican Primary Election, 1936
Party	Candidate	Votes	%
Republican	George Miller	2,090	56.0
Republican	Bodenhofer	1,645	44.0
Total votes		3,735	100.0

Iowa Senate, District 24 General Election, 1936
Party	Candidate	Votes	%
Democratic	H. D. Miller (incumbent)	8,686	53.7
Republican	George Miller	7,376	45.6
Farmer–Labor	Carl J. Mitzner	106	0.7
Total votes		16,168	100.0
Democratic hold			

=== District 25 ===
Iowa Senate, District 25 Democratic Primary Election, 1936
Party	Candidate	Votes	%
Democratic	Paul W. Schmidt (incumbent)	1,683	51.1
Democratic	Hite	1,611	48.9
Total votes		3,294	100.0

Iowa Senate, District 25 General Election, 1936
Party	Candidate	Votes	%
Republican	Frederick C. Schadt	10,340	49.6
Democratic	Paul W. Schmidt (incumbent)	9,582	46.0
Farmer–Labor	H. G. Smith	908	4.4
Total votes		20,830	100.0
Republican gain from Democratic			

=== District 26 ===
Iowa Senate, District 26 General Election, 1936
Party	Candidate	Votes	%
Republican	Frank C. Byers (incumbent)	19,888	52.7
Democratic	R. B. McConologue	17,137	45.4
Farmer–Labor	Ira Edwards	698	1.9
Total votes		37,723	100.0
Republican hold			

=== District 27 ===
Iowa Senate, District 27 Republican Primary Election, 1936
Party	Candidate	Votes	%
Republican	Francis J. Mullen	2,289	57.4
Republican	Rutledge	1,696	42.6
Total votes		3,985	100.0

Iowa Senate, District 27 Democratic Primary Election, 1936
Party	Candidate	Votes	%
Democratic	Edward Breen	2,152	49.2
Democratic	McManus	1,235	28.2
Democratic	Paul H. Anderson (incumbent)	990	22.6
Total votes		4,377	100.0

Iowa Senate, District 27 General Election, 1936
Party	Candidate	Votes	%
Democratic	Edward Breen	11,511	54.5
Republican	Francis J. Mullen	9,603	45.5
Total votes		21,114	100.0
Democratic hold			

=== District 28 ===
Iowa Senate, District 28 Republican Primary Election, 1936
Party	Candidate	Votes	%
Republican	B. C. Whitehill (incumbent)	2,082	57.4
Republican	McLean	1,548	42.6
Total votes		3,630	100.0

Iowa Senate, District 28 General Election, 1936
Party	Candidate	Votes	%
Republican	B. C. Whitehill (incumbent)	7,803	62.2
Democratic	Robert E. Johnson	4,736	37.8
Total votes		12,539	100.0
Republican hold			

=== District 30 ===
Iowa Senate, District 30 General Election, 1936
Party	Candidate	Votes	%
Democratic	J. J. Gillespie (incumbent)	35,514	51.1
Republican	George M. Faul	33,185	47.7
Farmer–Labor	H. P. Fagan	839	1.2
Total votes		69,538	100.0
Democratic hold			

=== District 31 ===
Iowa Senate, District 31 General Election, 1936
Party	Candidate	Votes	%
Republican	L. H. Doran	12,182	100.0
Total votes		12,182	100.0
Republican hold			

=== District 32 ===
Iowa Senate, District 32 Republican Primary Election, 1936
Party	Candidate	Votes	%
Republican	A. R. Strong	3,504	50.8
Republican	Gillman	3,394	49.2
Total votes		6,898	100.0

Iowa Senate, District 32 Democratic Primary Election, 1936
Party	Candidate	Votes	%
Democratic	Tom E. Murray	3,440	72.5
Democratic	Waller	1,302	27.5
Total votes		4,742	100.0

Iowa Senate, District 32 General Election, 1936
Party	Candidate	Votes	%
Democratic	Tom E. Murray	21,351	56.2
Republican	A. R. Strong	15,350	40.4
Farmer–Labor	Charles F. Schrunk	1,272	3.4
Total votes		37,973	100.0
Democratic hold			

=== District 33 ===
Iowa Senate, District 33 General Election, 1936
Party	Candidate	Votes	%
Republican	George L. Parker (incumbent)	9,332	52.4
Democratic	Dr. J. H. McGready	8,038	45.2
Farmer–Labor	L. W. Davis	425	2.4
Total votes		17,795	100.0
Republican hold			

=== District 36 ===
Iowa Senate, District 36 Democratic Primary Election, 1936
Party	Candidate	Votes	%
Democratic	M. X. Geske (incumbent)	1,405	61.6
Democratic	O'Neill	877	38.4
Total votes		2,282	100.0

Iowa Senate, District 36 General Election, 1936
Party	Candidate	Votes	%
Democratic	M. X. Geske (incumbent)	6,006	51.4
Republican	G. W. Hunt	5,451	46.7
Farmer–Labor	M. D. Guyer	223	1.9
Total votes		11,680	100.0
Democratic hold			

=== District 37 ===
Iowa Senate, District 37 Republican Primary Election, 1936
Party	Candidate	Votes	%
Republican	G. R. Hill (incumbent)	3,032	52.0
Republican	Ellsworth	2,803	48.0
Total votes		5,835	100.0

Iowa Senate, District 37 General Election, 1936
Party	Candidate	Votes	%
Republican	G. R. Hill (incumbent)	10,768	46.4
Democratic	Oscar Ulstad	10,306	44.4
Independent	William Schmedika	2,126	9.2
Total votes		23,200	100.0
Republican hold			

=== District 39 ===
Iowa Senate, District 39 Republican Primary Election, 1936
Party	Candidate	Votes	%
Republican	C. Colfax Smith	2,413	52.1
Republican	Lynes	2,220	47.9
Total votes		4,633	100.0

Iowa Senate, District 39 General Election, 1936
Party	Candidate	Votes	%
Republican	C. Colfax Smith	7,304	50.2
Democratic	L. H. Meyer (incumbent)	6,989	48.1
Farmer–Labor	Theodore Biekert	249	1.7
Total votes		14,542	100.0
Republican gain from Democratic			

=== District 40 ===
Iowa Senate, District 40 Republican Primary Election, 1936
Party	Candidate	Votes	%
Republican	Paul P. Stewart	2,924	53.9
Republican	Lee	2,502	46.1
Total votes		5,426	100.0

Iowa Senate, District 40 Democratic Primary Election, 1936
Party	Candidate	Votes	%
Democratic	T. W. Mullaney (incumbent)	1,430	55.0
Democratic	Holmes	1,170	45.0
Total votes		2,600	100.0

Iowa Senate, District 40 General Election, 1936
Party	Candidate	Votes	%
Republican	Paul P. Stewart	11,266	54.4
Democratic	T. W. Mullaney (incumbent)	9,427	45.6
Total votes		20,693	100.0
Republican gain from Democratic			

=== District 41 ===
Iowa Senate, District 41 Republican Primary Election, 1936
Party	Candidate	Votes	%
Republican	Leo Elthon (incumbent)	3,321	56.2
Republican	Aasgaard	2,593	43.8
Total votes		5,914	100.0

Iowa Senate, District 41 General Election, 1936
Party	Candidate	Votes	%
Republican	Leo Elthon (incumbent)	8,440	56.3
Democratic	S. S. Westley	6,563	43.7
Total votes		15,003	100.0
Republican hold			

=== District 43 ===
Iowa Senate, District 43 General Election, 1936
Party	Candidate	Votes	%
Democratic	Earl Dean	14,108	52.0
Republican	J. C. Robinson	13,025	48.0
Total votes		27,133	100.0
Democratic hold			

=== District 46 ===
Iowa Senate, District 46 Democratic Primary Election, 1936
Party	Candidate	Votes	%
Democratic	Winfred Mighell	2,088	52.5
Democratic	Mike G. Fisch (incumbent)	1,890	47.5
Total votes		3,978	100.0

Iowa Senate, District 46 General Election, 1936
Party	Candidate	Votes	%
Democratic	Winfred Mighell	11,165	53.3
Republican	R. E. Hess	9,765	46.7
Total votes		20,930	100.0
Democratic hold			

=== District 47 ===
Iowa Senate, District 47 General Election, 1936
Party	Candidate	Votes	%
Democratic	Lester Gillette	19,101	56.6
Republican	Harry E. Narey	14,510	42.9
Farmer–Labor	C. H. Larison	180	0.5
Total votes		33,791	100.0
Democratic gain from Republican			

=== District 49 ===
Iowa Senate, District 49 Democratic Primary Election, 1936
Party	Candidate	Votes	%
Democratic	Charles J. Zylstra	1,191	51.6
Democratic	Riegel	1,116	48.4
Total votes		2,307	100.0

Iowa Senate, District 49 General Election, 1936
Party	Candidate	Votes	%
Republican	Charles B. Hoeven	13,364	50.8
Democratic	Charles J. Zylstra	12,945	49.2
Total votes		26,309	100.0
Republican hold			

== See also ==
- United States elections, 1936
- United States House of Representatives elections in Iowa, 1936
- Elections in Iowa
