= Senator Guernsey =

Senator Guernsey may refer to:

- Frank E. Guernsey (1866–1927), Maine State Senate
- Hugh Guernsey (1892–1992), Iowa State Senate
