= Allert Olson =

American politician (1896–1976)

Member of the Iowa House of Representatives from the 93rd district
- In office January 8, 1945 – January 11, 1953

Personal details
- Born: March 13, 1896 Rudd Township, Floyd County, Iowa, U.S.
- Died: April 11, 1976 (aged 80) Osage, Iowa, U.S.
- Party: Republican
- Spouse: Rikka M. H. Haugen (m. 1927)
- Children: 4
- Education: Cedar Valley Seminary; Iowa State College
- Occupation: Politician, farmer

Military service
- Allegiance: United States
- Branch/service: United States Army
- Battles/wars: World War I

Allert Gilman Olson (March 13, 1896 – April 11, 1976) was an American politician and farmer who served in the Iowa House of Representatives from 1945 to 1953, representing Iowa's 93rd House of Representatives district as a member of the Republican Party.

== Early life ==
Allert Olson was born in Rudd Township, Floyd County, Iowa, to parents Martin B. and Martha M. Olson on March 13, 1896. He was educated in rural schools, the Cedar Valley Seminary and Osage High School. Olson subsequently attended Iowa State College for approximately three semesters until his January 1918 enlistment in the United States Army.

== Career ==
Olson served in World War I with the 88th Division. Olson married Rikka M. H. Haugen in 1927, with whom he raised three daughters and a son. Olson was a farmer and worked for several electrical companies and electrical organizations.

Olson was a member of the Iowa House of Representatives for four terms, serving District 93 from January 8, 1945, to January 11, 1953, as a Republican. He contested the Republican Party primary for District 41 before the 1952 Iowa Senate election, losing to Jacob Grimstead.

== Death ==
Olson died at the Mitchell County Memorial Hospital in Osage on April 11, 1976.
