= Senator Augustine =

Senator Augustine may refer to:

- Albert Earl Augustine (1890–1975), Iowa State Senate
- Kathy Augustine (1956–2006), Nevada State Senate
- Malcolm Augustine (born 1969), Maryland State Senate
