= William Lynes =

American politician (1893–1963)

William Sanford Lynes (26 August 1893 – 30 April 1963) was an American politician.

William Sanford Lynes was the firstborn son of Jennie Vosseller and James Jay Lynes, born in Plainfield, Iowa, on 26 August 1893. Lynes was a student at Cedar Valley Seminary, Iowa State University, and the University of Minnesota. He was employed by Mason City Brick and Tile as a drainage engineer and consultant for 25 years, and later was a bank director and farmer in Plainfield.

Lynes followed his younger brother James Kendall Lynes into public service, representing District 72 in the Iowa House of Representatives four consecutive terms from 1947 to 1955. He also served as speaker of the house between 1951 and 1955. William Lynes served his final term as state representative for District 72 from 1961 to 1963, and died later that year, on 30 April.
