= Senator Munger =

Senator Munger may refer to:

- George G. Munger (1828–1895), New York State Senate
- Robert P. Munger (1909–2001), Iowa State Senate
