= Robert Munger =

Robert Munger may refer to:

- Robert P. Munger (1909–2001), American lawyer, politician, and veteran of World War II
- Robert S. Munger (1854–1923), American inventor and business executive
