= Forsling =

Forsling is a surname. Notable people with the surname include:

- Gustav Forsling (born 1996), Swedish ice hockey defenceman
- Linus Forsling (1891–1970), American lawyer, politician, and judge from Iowa
- Ruth Forsling (1923–1985), Swedish educator, activist, and politician

== See also ==
- Elizabeth Forsling Harris
