= Senator Gillespie =

Senator Gillespie may refer to:

- Ann Gillespie (politician) (born 1958 or 1959), Illinois State Senate
- Bill Gillespie (politician) (1928–2008), Florida State Senate
- Bruce Gillespie (politician) (born 1946), Montana State Senate
- Christi Gillespie (fl. 2010s–2010s), Oklahoma State Senate
- James Gillespie (North Carolina politician) (1747–1805), North Carolina Senate
- James J. Gillespie (1892–1959), Iowa State Senate
- Jerry Gillespie (politician) (1950–2011), Arizona State Senate
- Joseph Gillespie (1809–1885), Illinois State Senate
