= Senator Hultman =

Senator Hultman may refer to:

- Calvin Hultman (1941–2017), Iowa State Senate
- Eugene Hultman (1875–1945), Massachusetts State Senate
- Oscar Hultman (1887–1969), Iowa State Senate
