= Flora May Woodard Tuttle =

American writer, botanist, and geologist

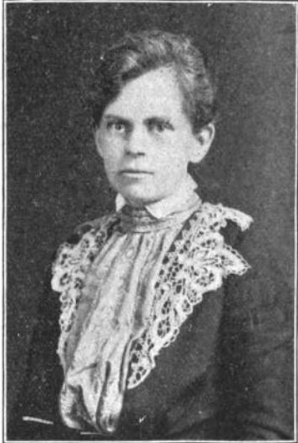
- Born: April 15, 1868
- Died: February 1931 (aged 62)
- Occupations: Writer, botanist, geologist
- Known for: Articles, books

Flora May Woodard Tuttle (April 15, 1868 – February 1931) was an American writer, botanist, and geologist.

== Early life ==
Tuttle was born in a log cabin on a farm that was nine miles from Manchester, Iowa on April 15, 1868. At two years old, she moved with her parents to Milwaukee, Wisconsin. She lived in Jefferson, Wisconsin for one year when she was four years old, later moving to Osage, Iowa. In June 1889, Tuttle graduated from high school as valedictorian and then attended Cedar Valley Seminary for one year. In May 1890, she married Hiram E. Tuttle and they had four children. She donated her botany collection to the high school in Osage and donated a large geological collection to the Cedar Valley Seminary.

== Career ==
Tuttle was a fellow of the Iowa Academy of Science, part of the American Association for the Advancement of Science, and part of the National Geographic Society. She was the author of Flora of Mitchell County which contains her analyses of 500 plants. She also wrote a history of the Osage Baptist Church with the help of reverend C. J. Pope. Tuttle was a reporter for Osage News for 10 years. She was the president of the American Society of Curio Collectors and was known as a geologist. A fossil was named after her. Tuttle wrote articles for the Globe-Gazette, including notes for her own obituary while she was ill in bed.

== Death ==
Tuttle died in February 1931 and was buried in Osage, Iowa.
