= Conrad Ossian =

American politician (1900–1976)

Member of the Iowa House of Representatives from the 12th district
- In office January 14, 1957 – January 10, 1971
- Preceded by: Oscar Hultman
- Succeeded by: Luvern W. Kehe

Personal details
- Born: March 27, 1900 Stanton, Iowa
- Died: June 6, 1976 (aged 76) Red Oak, Iowa
- Party: Republican

Conrad Ossian (March 27, 1900 – June 6, 1976) was an American politician who served in the Iowa House of Representatives from the 12th district from 1957 to 1971.
