= Charles Foster (Iowa politician) =

American politician in Iowa (1819–1864)

Charles Foster (December 26, 1819 – August 21, 1864) was an American politician.

Born in Hanover, New Hampshire, on December 26, 1819, Foster graduated from Dartmouth College. He moved to northern Ohio in 1840, and became a schoolteacher. In 1849, Foster and a group of friends planned to move farther west, but did not make it to California due to a cholera outbreak. Instead, Foster settled in Washington County, Iowa, where he worked as a farmer and lawyer.

Foster served in the Iowa Senate from 1856 to 1860, as a Republican lawmaker for District 14. During his legislative tenure, Foster helped pass several bills related to educational causes. Foster joined the 11th Iowa Infantry Regiment on April 21, 1861, was successively promoted to captain on October 1, 1861, and major on September 1, 1862. He saw action during the Vicksburg campaign and Battle of Shiloh, where he was wounded. He was fatally injured during the Battle of Atlanta on July 22, 1864, while aiding another wounded soldier, and died of his wounds on August 21, 1864.
