= Henry Heideman =

American politician (1889–1978)

Henry Emil Heideman (December 23, 1889 – November 7, 1978) was an American politician.

Heideman was born in Danforth, Illinois, on December 23, 1889, to parents Herman Heideman and Laura Kathryn Barkmeier. The family moved to Harvey when Henry was seven. There, Henry attended school, then graduated from a business college in Chicago. Heideman became a sheet metal and machine shop worker. He married Harvey native Lillian Robinson in 1910, with whom he started a coal and retail animal feed business, and raised three children. In 1946, Henry and Lillian moved with their younger children near Rockwell City, Iowa, where he started a farm alongside his son George. In later life, George relocated to El Dorado Hills, California. Heideman's eldest daughter Evelyn had married and remained in Harvey for some time, later moving to Steger.

From 1953 to 1957, Henry Heideman served a single four-year term in the Iowa Senate for District 27 as a Republican. His younger daughter Mary was his legislative aide.

Heideman died in Rochester, Minnesota, on November 7, 1978.
