= George Stinemates =

American politician (1877–1963)

George W. Stinemates (12 April 1877 – 28 April 1963) was an American politician.

Stinemates was a lifelong resident of Douglas Township, Montgomery County, Iowa. He was born on 12 April 1877 to parents Leander D. and Etta M. Stinemates. He was a Methodist and married Edith Conrad in 1900, with whom he had two children, Harold and Velma.

Stinemates was a Republican. He served on the Grant Independent School Board for twenty-one years, and as trustee of Douglas Township for twelve years. Stinemates was first elected a Montgomery County supervisor in 1931, and relinquished control of his farm to his son upon taking office. After a nine-year tenure as a county supervisor, Stinemates won his first election to the Iowa House of Representatives in 1940, from District 12. He was reelected in 1942 and served until 1945. Stinemates died in Red Oak on 28 April 1963.
