= Louis Tuttle Shangle =

American politician (1862–1935)

Louis Tuttle Shangle (March 18, 1862 – September 2, 1935) was an American politician.

L. T. Shangle was born on March 18, 1862, to parents Amos L. and Mary Wick Shangle and raised on the family farm in Prairie Township, Mahaska County, Iowa. He was educated in county schools, and graduated from William Penn College in 1883. Shangle read law at the firm Bolton & McCoy until passing the bar in 1889, and moved to Grand Island, Nebraska, the following year, where he began a legal practice. In 1895, Shangle moved his residence and legal practice to Oskaloosa, Iowa.

Shangle was a member and secretary of the Oskaloosa School Board from 1903 to 1921, and served William Penn College as a trustee, executive committee member, and treasurer. He ran in the 1932 Iowa Senate election as a candidate affiliated with the Democratic Party, and won the District 14 seat. Shangle died in office on September 2, 1935, and was succeeded by Albert Earl Augustine. William Penn University established a Louis Tuttle Shangle Professorship of History.
