= Melvin Burns =

American politician (1902–1983)

Member of the Iowa House of Representatives from the 99th district
- In office January 13, 1941 – January 10, 1943

Personal details
- Born: December 6, 1902 Larchwood, Iowa, U.S.
- Died: October 30, 1983 (aged 80) Luverne, Minnesota, U.S.
- Party: Republican
- Spouse: Arlie Pruitt (m. 1934)
- Education: Morningside College; University of South Dakota
- Occupation: Politician, lawyer

Melvin Burns (December 6, 1902 – October 30, 1983) was an American lawyer and politician.

A native of Larchwood, Iowa, born on December 6, 1902, Burns graduated from his hometown high school in 1921, then attended Morningside College for two years before transferring to the University of South Dakota. Burns was admitted to the South Dakota bar in 1928, having completed his legal studies at the University of South Dakota School of Law earlier that year. He subsequently relocated to California for two years to work within the trust department of the Los Angeles branch of the Bank of Italy. Burns moved his legal practice to Rock Rapids, Iowa, in 1932. He married Arlie Pruitt of Larchwood on December 25, 1934.

Burns served as Lyon County attorney from 1935 to 1936, and was elected to a single term on the Iowa House of Representatives between January 13, 1941, and January 10, 1943. He represented District 99 as a Republican. Burns later served a second stint as Lyon County attorney from 1945 to 1946. He died in a Luverne, Minnesota, hospital on October 30, 1983, aged 80.
