= Carroll McCurdy =

American politician

Member of the Iowa Senate from the 14th district
- In office January 14, 1957 – January 9, 1961
- Preceded by: Charles Stewart
- Succeeded by: John Gray

Personal details
- Born: January 6, 1917 Cedar, Iowa
- Died: October 12, 2003 (aged 86) Oskaloosa, Iowa
- Party: Democratic

Carroll McCurdy (January 6, 1917 – October 12, 2003) was an American politician who served in the Iowa Senate from the 14th district from 1957 to 1961.

He died on October 12, 2003, in Oskaloosa, Iowa at age 86.
