= James J. Gillespie =

American politician (1892–1959)

James J. Gillespie (May 13, 1892 – February 16, 1959) was an American politician from Iowa.

James Gillespie was born on May 13, 1892, in Scranton, Iowa, to physician John J. Gillespie and his wife Margaret McCune. The Gillespies moved to Des Moines, where James completed compulsory education. He attended Highland Park College and Drake University, then began his pharmaceutical career in 1917, eventually operating a number of drugstores throughout Des Moines. Gillespie served in the military during the final year of World War I.

Gillespie succeeded George A. Wilson in a 1936 special election for the Iowa Senate, and retained the District 30 seat in the full-term election later that same year. Gillespie was the first Democratic legislator to hold that seat in eight decades, from which he stepped down on January 8, 1939. Between 1941 and 1950, Gillespie was a United States Marshal for southern Iowa.

Gillespie died of a heart attack on February 16, 1959, while at home in Des Moines.
