= David Sherman West =

American politician (1885–1973)

Member of the Iowa Senate from the 3rd district
- In office January 10, 1949 – January 11, 1953
- Preceded by: James R. Barkley
- Succeeded by: Ted D. Clark

Personal details
- Born: David Sherman West; August 9, 1885 Moulton, Iowa, United States
- Died: September 3, 1973 (aged 88) Brownsville, Texas, United States
- Party: Democratic

David Sherman West (August 9, 1885 – September 3, 1973) was an American politician from the state of Iowa.

West was born in Moulton, Appanoose County, Iowa in 1885. He served as a Democrat in the Iowa Senate from 1949 to 1953. He died in Brownsville, Cameron County, Texas in 1973.

Iowa Senate
Preceded by James R. Barkley	3rd district 1949–1953	Succeeded by Ted D. Clark
