= James R. Barkley =

American politician (1869–1948)

Member of the Iowa Senate from the 3rd district
- In office January 8, 1945 – July 26, 1948
- Preceded by: Dewey Goode
- Succeeded by: D. Sherman West

Personal details
- Born: James Robert Barkley; February 13, 1869 Davis County, Iowa, U.S.
- Died: July 26, 1948 (aged 79) Moulton, Iowa, U.S.
- Party: Republican

James Robert Barkley (February 13, 1869 – July 26, 1948) was an American politician based in Iowa.

Barkley was born in Davis County, Iowa in 1869. He served as a Republican in the Iowa Senate from January 8, 1945, until his death in Moulton on July 26, 1948.

Iowa Senate
Preceded by Dewey Goode	3rd district 1945–1948	Succeeded by D. Sherman West
