= Tom Ellis Murray =

American lawyer, politician (1891–1958)

Member of the Iowa Senate from the 32nd district
- In office January 11, 1937 – January 8, 1939
- Preceded by: Vincent F. Harrington
- Succeeded by: Linus Forsling

Personal details
- Born: August 21, 1891 Little Sioux, Iowa
- Died: May 9, 1958 (aged 66) Sioux City, Iowa
- Party: Democratic
- Education: University of Iowa College of Law

Tom Ellis Murray (August 21, 1891 – May 9, 1958) was an American lawyer and politician.

== Early life and legal career ==
Murray was born to parents Michael and Luella Murray on August 21, 1891, and raised on a farm near Little Sioux, Iowa. He attended primary and secondary school in the city before graduating from the University of Iowa College of Law in 1923. Murray began his career as a lawyer in his hometown, before moving to Sioux City to join the law firm Walter and Loepp in 1924. Murray established his own legal practice the following year.

== Public service career ==
Between 1933 and 1937, Murray served as the inaugural assistant Woodbury County attorney. He was elected to the Iowa Senate in 1936 as a Democratic legislator for District 32, and took office on January 11, 1937. In 1938, Murray was nominated as a candidate for a district judgeship in the Fourth Judicial District, and stepped down from the state senate when the 47th Iowa General Assembly ended on January 8, 1939. Murray lost the 1938 general election for the judgeship. Between 1943 and 1944, Murray served as chief counsel for the Sioux City District of the Office of Price Administration. In 1953, Murray ended his tenure with the OPA, and from 1954 was the area rent director at the Sioux City Office of Rent Control as well city attorney for Sioux City. At the time of his death on May 9, 1958, Murray was still serving as city attorney and as area rent director.
