= Pearl Wayland McMurry =

Pearl Wayland McMurry (April 29, 1906 – August 8, 2002) was an American politician from the state of Iowa. A Republican, he served in the Iowa Senate for one term from 1949 to 1951.

He attended the University of Iowa (B.A.) and the University of Iowa College of Law (J.D.). He was commissioned in the United States Army in 1934. In 1941, he was called to active duty and served in the U.S. Army Air Forces during World War II. He was elected to the Iowa State Senate, Assembly 53.
