= Jans Dykhouse =

American politician (1889–1981)

Member of the Iowa Senate from the 24th district
- In office January 8, 1945 – January 11, 1965
- Preceded by: Edwin Schluter
- Succeeded by: Max Mills

Member of the Iowa Senate from the 49th district
- In office January 13, 1941 – January 8, 1945
- Preceded by: Charles Hoeven
- Succeeded by: Duane Dewel

Member of the Iowa House of Representatives from the 99th district
- In office January 11, 1937 – January 13, 1941
- Preceded by: William Oehmke
- Succeeded by: Melvin Burns

Personal details
- Born: December 9, 1889 Hastings, Nebraska
- Died: May 24, 1981 (aged 91) Rock Rapids, Iowa
- Party: Republican

Jans T. Dykhouse (December 9, 1889 – May 24, 1981) was an American politician.

Born in Hastings, Nebraska, on December 9, 1889, Dykehouse was raised in Lyon County, Iowa, where his family had moved in 1892. He graduated from Rock Rapids High School and the University of Dubuque. After completing his college education in 1916, Dykehouse worked as a banker for fifteen years, and subsequently diversified his business interests into real estate, insurance, and farming.

Dykhouse was affiliated with the Republican Party. He won election to the Iowa House of Representatives in 1936 and 1938, serving District 99. Dykhouse contested the 1940 Iowa Senate election, and won the District 49 seat for a single four-year term. He was reelected to the Iowa Senate five times thereafter, as the legislator representing District 24.

Dykhouse attended the Rock Rapids United Methodist Church. He married Little Rock native Dora Getting in October 1917, with whom he raised three children. He died on May 24, 1981, in Rock Rapids, Iowa at age 91.
