= Clermont Colfax Smith =

American politician (1868–1939)

Clermont Colfax Smith (28 November 1868 – 5 December 1939) was an American educator, physician, and politician.

A native of Adair County, Iowa, born on 28 November 1868, Smith attended county public schools and completed high school in Harlan, then became a country schoolteacher. After taking a college-level course in education, he was elected school superintendent in Fontanelle. Smith resigned the superintendency to enroll at Northwestern Medical School, from which he graduated in 1904. Upon obtaining his medical qualifications, Smith moved to Clarksville and began practicing medicine.

Smith won his first state legislative election as a Republican Party candidate in 1934, and served District 73 of the Iowa House of Representatives from 14 January 1935 to 10 January 1937. He was then elected to the Iowa Senate, and held the District 39 seat until his death at home in Clarksville on 5 December 1939.
