= Morris Moore =

American physician and politician (1893–1982)

Member of the Iowa Senate from the 19th district
- In office January 9, 1933 – January 12, 1941
- Preceded by: William Samuel Baird
- Succeeded by: De Vere Watson

Personal details
- Born: September 11, 1874 Washington, Iowa
- Died: October 16, 1944 (aged 70) Council Bluffs, Iowa
- Party: Democratic
- Occupation: physician

Morris W. Moore (September 11, 1874 – October 16, 1944) was an American physician and politician.

Morris Moore was born September 11, 1874, in Washington, Iowa, to physician E. B. Moore and his wife Elizabeth Watters. The Moore family moved to Harlan in 1874, where young Morris attended public school. Like his father, Moore chose to pursue medicine. After graduating from John A. Creighton Medical College in 1901, he relocated to Walnut, Iowa, the following year to practice medicine. During the Spanish flu pandemic, Moore completed postgraduate work at the University of Iowa College of Medicine.

Moore was affiliated with the Democratic Party and a member of the Walnut City Council and board of education. He was first elected to the Iowa Senate in 1932 for District 19. Moore won reelection in 1936 and stepped down at the end of his second term.

Moore died on October 16, 1944, at a hospital in Council Bluffs. He was survived by his wife Cora F. Backus, whom he had married in 1905, and two daughters.
