= Moulton, Iowa =

- City
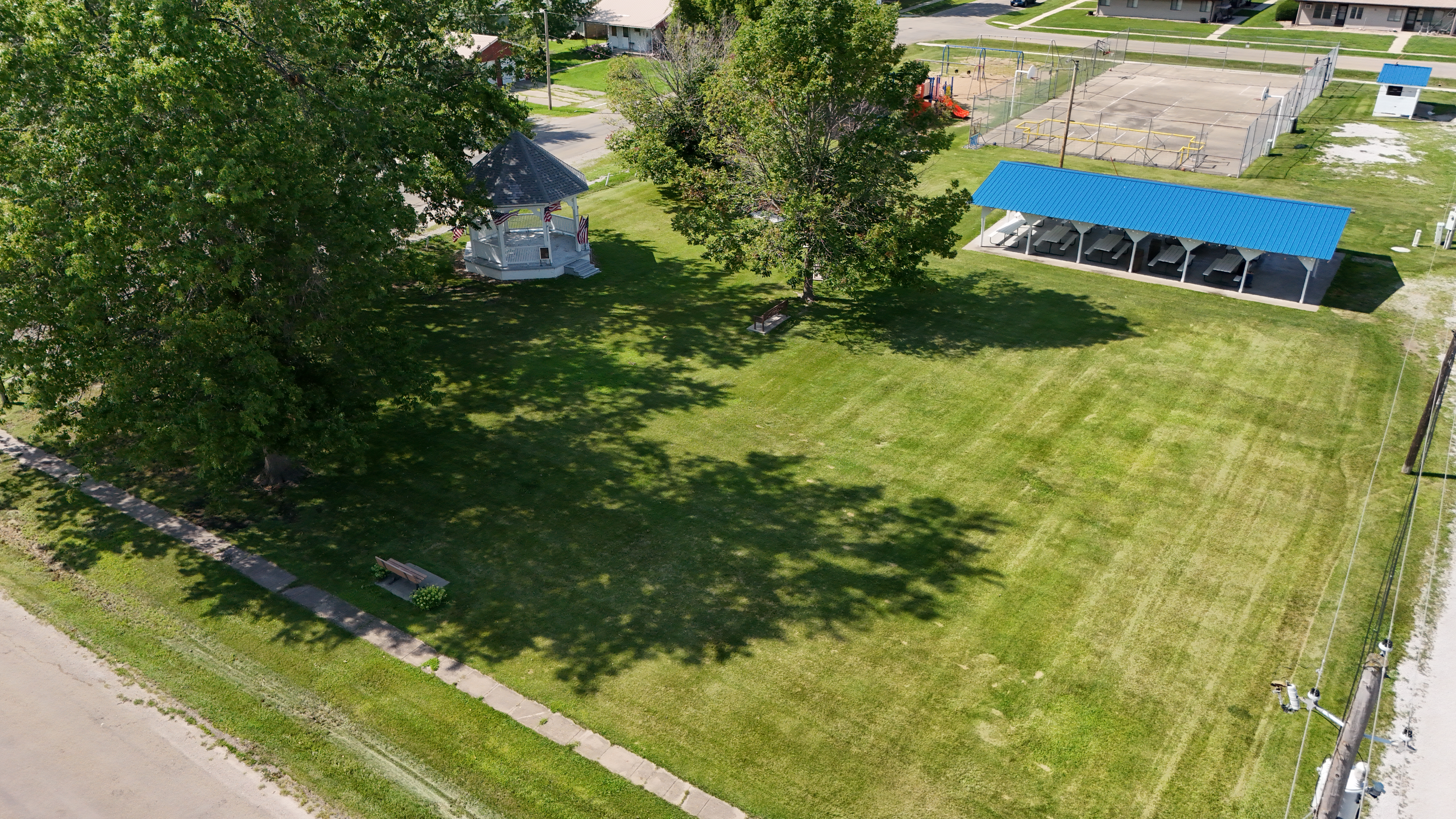
- Pulliam Park

- Location of Moulton, Iowa
- Coordinates: 40°41′08″N 92°40′35″W
- Country: US
- State: Iowa
- County: Appanoose

Area
  - Total: 1.00 sq mi (2.58 km^{2})
  - Land: 1.00 sq mi (2.58 km^{2})
  - Water: 0 sq mi (0.00 km^{2})
- Elevation: 994 ft (303 m)

Population (2020)
  - Total: 607
  - Density: 608.7/sq mi (235.03/km^{2})
- Time zone: UTC-6 (Central (CST))
  - Summer (DST): UTC-5 (CDT)
- ZIP code: 52572
- Area code: 641
- FIPS code: 19-54390
- GNIS feature ID: 2395419
- Website: moultoniowa.com

Moulton is a city in Appanoose County, Iowa, United States. The population was 607 at the time of the 2020 census.

== History ==
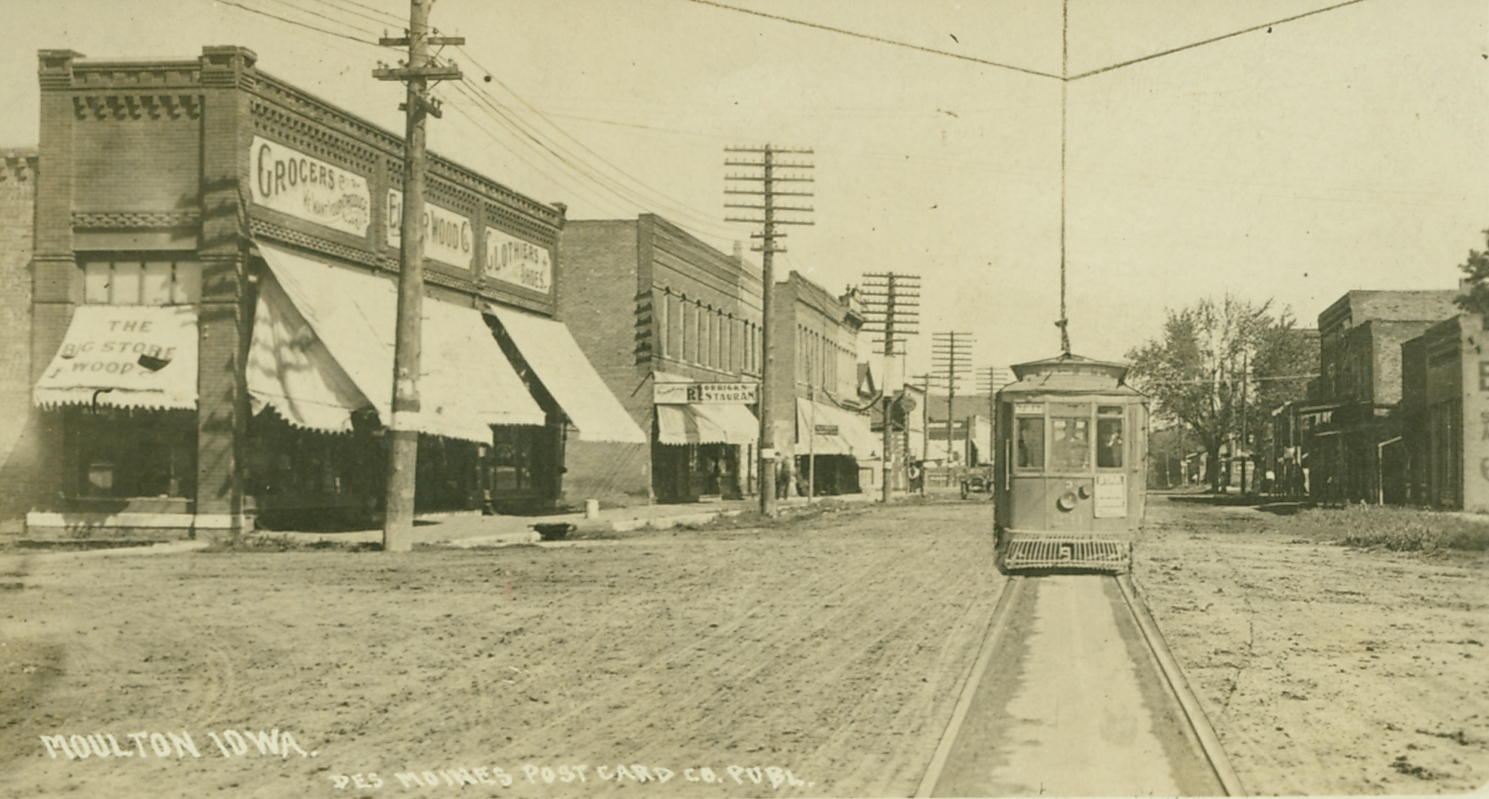
Main Street, 1924

Moulton was platted in 1867. In 1873, the Burlington and Southwestern Railway was built into the settlement.

== Geography ==
According to the United States Census Bureau, the city has a total area of 1.01 square miles (2.62 km^{2}), all land.

== Demographics ==
Historical populations
Year	Pop.	±%
1870	678	—
1880	681	+0.4%
1890	769	+12.9%
1900	1,420	+84.7%
1910	1,233	−13.2%
1920	1,387	+12.5%
1930	1,476	+6.4%
1940	1,181	−20.0%
1950	985	−16.6%
1960	773	−21.5%
1970	763	−1.3%
1980	762	−0.1%
1990	613	−19.6%
2000	658	+7.3%
2010	605	−8.1%
2020	607	+0.3%
Source:"U.S. Census website". United States Census Bureau. and Iowa Data Center; Source: U.S. Decennial Census

=== 2020 census ===
As of the census of 2020, there were 607 people, 261 households, and 159 families residing in the city. The population density was 598.8 inhabitants per square mile (231.2/km^{2}). There were 293 housing units at an average density of 289.0 per square mile (111.6/km^{2}). The racial makeup of the city was 94.4% White, 0.0% Black or African American, 0.0% Native American, 0.2% Asian, 0.0% Pacific Islander, 0.3% from other races and 5.1% from two or more races. Hispanic or Latino persons of any race comprised 1.5% of the population.

Of the 261 households, 32.2% of which had children under the age of 18 living with them, 41.0% were married couples living together, 5.0% were cohabitating couples, 29.5% had a female householder with no spouse or partner present and 24.5% had a male householder with no spouse or partner present. 39.1% of all households were non-families. 34.1% of all households were made up of individuals, 14.9% had someone living alone who was 65 years old or older.

The median age in the city was 39.3 years. 27.8% of the residents were under the age of 20; 4.9% were between the ages of 20 and 24; 24.2% were from 25 and 44; 22.9% were from 45 and 64; and 20.1% were 65 years of age or older. The gender makeup of the city was 50.9% male and 49.1% female.

=== 2010 census ===
As of the census of 2010, there were 605 people, 264 households, and 164 families living in the city. The population density was 599.0 inhabitants per square mile (231.3/km^{2}). There were 312 housing units at an average density of 308.9 per square mile (119.3/km^{2}). The racial makeup of the city was 98.3% White, 0.3% Native American, 0.5% from other races, and 0.8% from two or more races. Hispanic or Latino of any race were 0.8% of the population.

There were 264 households, of which 30.7% had children under the age of 18 living with them, 39.8% were married couples living together, 14.4% had a female householder with no husband present, 8.0% had a male householder with no wife present, and 37.9% were non-families. 34.8% of all households were made up of individuals, and 17.8% had someone living alone who was 65 years of age or older. The average household size was 2.29 and the average family size was 2.91.

The median age in the city was 42.7 years. 26.1% of residents were under the age of 18; 7% were between the ages of 18 and 24; 21.4% were from 25 to 44; 23.7% were from 45 to 64; and 22% were 65 years of age or older. The gender makeup of the city was 47.9% male and 52.1% female.

=== 2000 census ===
As of the census of 2000, there were 658 people, 302 households, and 176 families living in the city. The population density was 647.8 inhabitants per square mile (250.1/km^{2}). There were 332 housing units at an average density of 326.9 per square mile (126.2/km^{2}). The racial makeup of the city was 97.72% White, 0.30% African American, 1.22% Native American, 0.15% Asian, and 0.61% from two or more races. Hispanic or Latino of any race were 0.15% of the population.

There were 302 households, out of which 23.8% had children under the age of 18 living with them, 45.4% were married couples living together, 8.3% had a female householder with no husband present, and 41.4% were non-families. 38.1% of all households were made up of individuals, and 18.2% had someone living alone who was 65 years of age or older. The average household size was 2.18 and the average family size was 2.88.

In the city, the population was spread out, with 22.9% under the age of 18, 9.1% from 18 to 24, 22.6% from 25 to 44, 22.0% from 45 to 64, and 23.3% who were 65 years of age or older. The median age was 42 years. For every 100 females, there were 97.6 males. For every 100 females age 18 and over, there were 98.8 males.

The median income for a household in the city was $22,692, and the median income for a family was $31,875. Males had a median income of $23,250 versus $17,353 for females. The per capita income for the city was $14,744. About 11.4% of families and 14.8% of the population were below the poverty line, including 24.8% of those under age 18 and 10.1% of those age 65 or over.

== Notable people ==
- Austin Harris, Current member of Iowa House of Representatives
- Claude R. Porter, government official and politician
- Larry Sheets, member of Iowa House of Representatives for District 80
- Nellie Walker, American sculptor
