= Linus Forsling =

American lawyer, politician (1891–1970)

Member of the Iowa Senate from the 32nd district
- In office January 9, 1939 – January 12, 1941
- Preceded by: Tom Ellis Murray
- Succeeded by: Robert Prentis Munger

Member of the Iowa House of Representatives from the 58th district
- In office January 10, 1921 – January 8, 1933
- Preceded by: multi-member district
- Succeeded by: multi-member district

Personal details
- Born: Linus Bernadotte Forsling; March 23, 1891 Sioux City, Iowa
- Died: May 2, 1970 (aged 79) Anthon, Iowa
- Party: Republican
- Education: Cumberland School of Law

Military service
- Branch/service: United States Navy
- Unit: Seabee
- Battles/wars: World War II

Linus Bernadotte Forsling (March 23, 1891 – May 2, 1970) was an American lawyer, politician, and judge.

== Early life and legal career ==
A Sioux City, Iowa, native born on March 23, 1891, Forsling attended city schools, and earned his law degree at the Cumberland School of Law, which was affiliated with Cumberland University at the time. Forsling returned to Sioux City to set up his legal practice in 1915. Three years later, he began serving as Sioux City police judge.

== Political career, military service, and district judgeship ==
Forsling was affiliated with the Republican Party and won his first election to the Iowa House of Representatives in 1920. He remained in office, all for District 58, from January 10, 1921, to January 8, 1933. Forsling returned to the Iowa General Assembly in the 1938 elections, as a member of the Iowa Senate for District 32 from January 9, 1939, to January 12, 1941. Between 1940 and 1958, Forsling was a district judge in the Fourth Judicial District, which included the counties of Monona and Woodbury. His judgeship was interrupted by military service in the Asiatic-Pacific Theater of World War II as a Seabee.

== Personal life and death ==
Forsling married Lillian Nash on February 12, 1914. After her death, he remarried to Edith V. Cover on January 14, 1937 who died in 1959. Linus Forsling died on May 2, 1970, in Anthon, Iowa.
