= Oscar Hultman =

American politician (1887–1969)

Member of the Iowa House of Representatives from the 12th district
- In office January 10, 1955 – January 13, 1957
- Preceded by: Elmer A. Bass
- Succeeded by: Conrad Ossian
- In office January 9, 1933 – January 12, 1941
- Preceded by: Homer Hush
- Succeeded by: George W. Stinemates

Member of the Iowa Senate from the 8th district
- In office January 8, 1945 – January 11, 1953
- Preceded by: Kenneth A. Evans
- Succeeded by: Henry W. Washburn

Personal details
- Born: November 2, 1887 Stanton, Iowa
- Died: September 14, 1969 (aged 81) Stanton, Iowa
- Party: Republican

Oscar N. Hultman (November 2, 1887 – September 14, 1969) was an American politician who served in the Iowa House of Representatives from the 12th district from 1933 to 1941 and from 1955 to 1957 and in the Iowa Senate from the 8th district from 1945 to 1953.

He died on September 14, 1969, in Stanton, Iowa at age 81. Hultman's son Calvin also served on the Iowa Senate.
