= J. Kendall Lynes =

American politician (1903–1962)

James Kendall "Buster" Lynes (22 March 1903 – 5 May 1962) was an American politician.

== Biography ==
Born on 22 March 1903 in Plainfield, Iowa, as the fourth of Jennie Vosseller and James Jay Lynes's seven children, James Kendall Lynes was raised on a farm. He graduated from school in Plainfield at the age of fifteen, and later enrolled at the Cedar Valley Seminary. At sixteen, Lynes and his brother Leonard began working together as farmers and breeders of Ayrshire cattle. Another of his brothers, William Sanford Lynes, was a member of the Iowa House of Representatives.

Lynes married Lenora Kuethe on 30 June 1926, and the couple raised three children. Lynes won his first term in the Iowa Senate in 1940, and served District 39 as a Republican Party legislator until his death on 5 May 1962.
