= Robert P. Munger =

American lawyer and politician (1909–2001)

Robert Munger

Member of the Iowa Senate from the 32nd district
- In office January 9, 1939 – January 12, 1941
- Preceded by: Linus Forsling
- Succeeded by: Adrian D. Clem

Member of the Iowa House of Representatives from the 58th district
- In office January 10, 1949 – January 11, 1953
- Preceded by: multi-member district
- Succeeded by: multi-member district

Personal details
- Born: Robert Prentis Munger; November 2, 1909 Sioux City, Iowa
- Died: October 23, 2001 (aged 91) Tucson, Arizona
- Party: Republican
- Education: Morningside College; University of South Dakota School of Law

Military service
- Branch/service: United States Army Air Forces
- Years of service: 1942–1945
- Battles/wars: World War II

Robert Prentis Munger (November 2, 1909 – October 23, 2001) was an American politician.

== Early life, education, and career ==
Robert Prentis Munger was born in Sioux City, Iowa, on November 2, 1909, to judge Robert Howe Munger and his wife Kathryn Belle Prentis. Robert P. Munger graduated from Sioux City Central High School, obtained a bachelor of arts at Morningside College in 1931, followed by a bachelor of laws at the University of South Dakota School of Law in 1933. Munger began practicing law in Sioux City upon completing his legal education.

== Public and military service career ==
Munger was elected to the Iowa Senate in 1940 as a Republican. He served in the 49th Iowa General Assembly from January 13, 1941, to January 10, 1943, representing Senate District 32. Munger submitted his resignation from the state senate in 1942, to join the United States Army Air Forces in World War II, attaining the rank of major. He was an AAF pilot, wrote the AAF manual on meteorology, and as leader of the Air Corps Contract Terminations, reported directly to general Henry H. Arnold. After his return from active military duty in 1945, Munger returned to the practice of law and was elected to two consecutive terms on the Iowa House of Representatives for District 58, serving between January 10, 1949, and January 11, 1953. He subsequently served as vice chairman of the Governmental Reorganization Commission and as a member of the Iowa Board of Regents.

== Personal life ==
Robert P. Munger's first wife, Kathryn Bryce Gantt, died in 1940 after the birth of their son, Robert Gantt Munger. Robert Prentis Munger remarried to Charlotte Watkin in 1941, and the couple had two more children, Clark Watkin Munger and John Francis Munger. Robert P. Munger and Charlotte Watkin moved to Tucson, Arizona, in 1965, where Munger died on October 23, 2001.
