= Hugh Guernsey =

American politician

Member of the Iowa Senate from the 3rd district
- In office December 21, 1936 – January 12, 1941
- Preceded by: John K. Valentine
- Succeeded by: Dewey Goode

Personal details
- Born: Hugh Gail Guernsey; August 10, 1892 Centerville, Iowa, United States
- Died: August 18, 1992 (aged 100) Des Moines, Iowa, United States
- Party: Democratic

Hugh G. Guernsey (August 10, 1892 – August 18, 1992) was an American politician and World War I veteran from the state of Iowa.

Guernsey was born in Centerville, Iowa, in 1892. He served as a Democrat in the Iowa Senate from 1936 to 1941. He died in Des Moines, Iowa, in 1992 at 100 years of age.

Iowa Senate
Preceded by John K. Valentine	3rd district 1936–1941	Succeeded by Dewey Goode
