= Cedar Valley Seminary =

- U.S. National Register of Historic Places
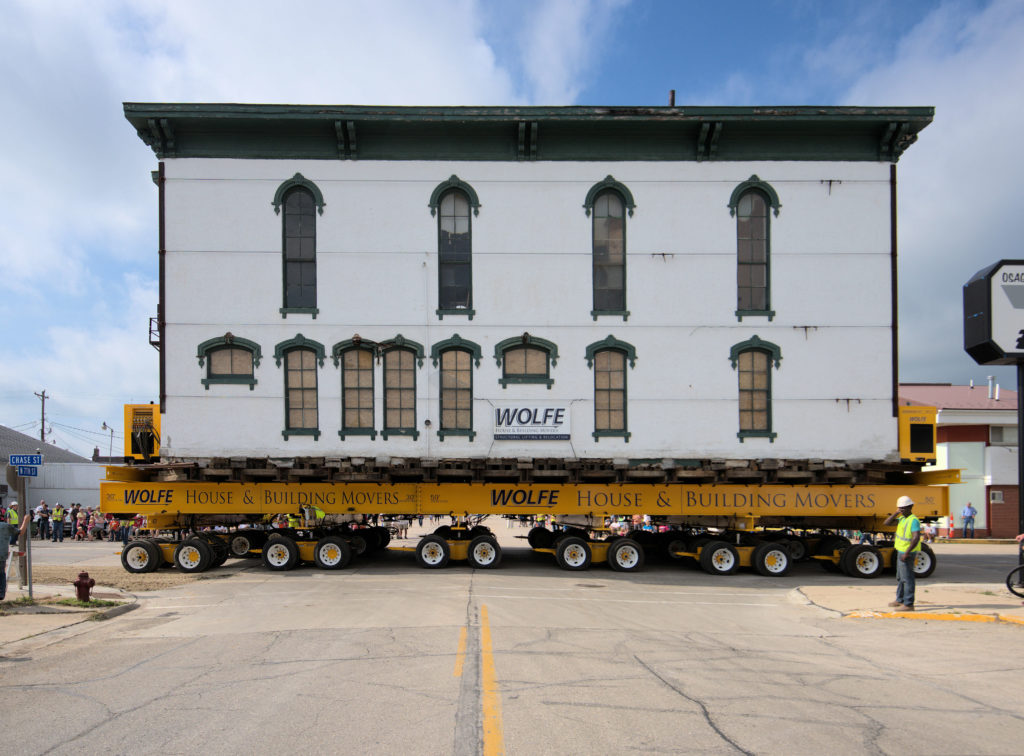
- The building being relocated in 2016

- Location within Iowa Location within the United States
- Location: N. 7th and Chase Sts., Osage, Iowa
- Coordinates: 43°17′10″N 92°48′49″W
- Area: less than one acre
- Built: 1869
- Architectural style: Italianate
- NRHP reference No.: 77000541

Significant dates
- Relocated: June 26, 2016
- Added to NRHP: November 17, 1977

Cedar Valley Seminary is a historic seminary building currently at N. 7th and Chase Streets in Osage, Iowa. Prior to June 2016, it had been located at N. 6th and Mechanic Streets.

It was built in 1869 and added to the National Register of Historic Places in 1977.

The school was founded at Osage, as a Baptist academy, in 1862, by the joint efforts of Rev. Alva Bush, the citizens of Osage, and the Cedar Valley Baptist Association. On Monday morning, January 12, 1863, Prof. Bush opened the first term of the school, with seventeen boys and fourteen girls.

In his memoir "A Son of the Middle Border", Hamlin Garland recalled that in the late 1870s "The school was in truth a very primitive institution, hardly more than a high school, but it served its purpose. It gave farmers' boys like myself the opportunity of meeting those who were older, finer, more learned than they, and every day was to me like turning a fresh and delightful page in a story book, not merely because it brought new friends, new experiences, but because it symbolized freedom from the hay fork and the hoe."

Before going to the University of Chicago, the orientalist John Merlin Powis Smith taught Greek at Cedar Valley Seminary.

The school was closed in 1910 because, according to one historian, "Waldorf College was established in Forest City by the Norwegian Lutheran people and took away many students and much financial support that would naturally have come to the seminary; the grade of work in the public schools improved with time, and the Cedar Valley Seminary was a near neighbor. These reasons made it seem unwise to longer continue to maintain the seminary".

== Relocation and future ==
On June 24, 2016, the building was moved 960 feet (290 m) to the corner of Chase Street and North Seventh Street. After a new foundation is built and renovations are completed, the building will be used as a community gathering place.

== Notable alumni ==
Notable alumni of Cedar Valley Seminary include:

- Hamlin Garland (1881), American novelist
