= De Vere Watson =

American lawyer and politician (1893–1982)

Member of the Iowa Senate from the 19th district
- In office January 13, 1941 – January 13, 1957
- Preceded by: Morris Moore
- Succeeded by: Jim O. Henry

Personal details
- Born: April 1, 1893 near Searsboro, Iowa
- Died: November 14, 1982 (aged 89) Missouri Valley, Iowa
- Party: Republican
- Occupation: lawyer

De Vere Watson (April 1, 1893 – November 14, 1982) was an American politician and lawyer.

De Vere Watson was born near Searsboro, Iowa, on April 1, 1893, to parents George M. and Clara Alice Watson. After graduating from Marshalltown High School in 1911, Watson pursued his law degree at the University of Iowa College of Law. Upon completing his legal education in 1915, Watson married Freole Placek. The couple moved to Council Bluffs that year, where Watson was a lawyer until his retirement in 1972. Before Placek's death in 1959, she and Watson had seven children.

Watson's legal career included stints as city attorney for Carter Lake and special city attorney for Council Bluffs, as well as for several drainage districts in western Iowa. Watson served as chair of the Republican Party in Pottawattamie County for several terms before winning his first election to the Iowa Senate in 1940. He held the District 19 seat for four terms from January 13, 1941, to January 13, 1957, and served as president pro tempore of the senate during the 56th Iowa General Assembly.

Watson died at the Missouri Valley Hospital in Missouri Valley, Iowa, on November 14, 1982, survived by his second wife Bessie and six of his children.
