= Iowa's 14th Senate district =

American legislative district

Iowa's 14th State Senate district
Senator
| Sarah Trone Garriott; D |

The 14th District of the Iowa Senate is located in central Iowa, and is currently composed of portions of Dallas County.

== Current elected officials ==
Sarah Trone Garriott is the senator currently representing the 14th District.

The area of the 14th District contains two Iowa House of Representatives districts:

- The 27th District (represented by Kenan Judge)
- The 28th District (represented by David Young)

The district is also located in Iowa's 3rd congressional district, which is represented by U.S. Representative Zach Nunn.

== List of representatives ==
| Representative | Party | Dates | Residence | Notes |
|---|---|---|---|---|
| Philip Burr Bradley | Democrat | 1846-1849 | Jackson County | |
| Nathan Sales | Democrat | 1850-1851 | Anamosa, Iowa | |
| John R. Needham | Whig | 1852-1855 | Oskaloosa, Iowa | |
| Charles Foster | Republican | 1856-1859 | Washington County | |
| Andrew Oliphant Patterson | Republican | 1860 | Muscatine County | Resigned after having moved to Colorado in 1860 |
| Joseph Green | Democrat | 1861 | Muscatine, Iowa | |
| William G. Woodward | Republican | 1862-1863 | Muscatine County | |
| James Hurley | Republican | 1864-1865 | Wapello, Iowa | |
| James Robertson | Republican | 1866-1869 | Burlington, Iowa | |
| James Hurley | Republican | 1870-1873 | Wapello, Iowa | |
| Hosea Newton | Anti-Monopoly | 1874-1875 | Keokuk County | |
| Hosea Newton | Republican | 1876-1877 | Keokuk County | |
| William Wilson | Democrat | 1878-1879 | Washington County | |
| John Wesley Prizer | Republican | 1880-1883 | Brighton, Iowa | |
| Benjamin McCoy | Republican | 1884-1891 | Oskaloosa, Iowa | |
| Alpheus Conaway | Republican | 1892-1895 | Mahaska County | |
| Lucian Blanchard | Republican | 1896-1903 | Oskaloosa, Iowa | |
| William G. Jones | Republican | 1904-1908 | Oskaloosa, Iowa | |
| John Ream | Democrat | 1909-1916 | Mahaska County | |
| Elmer Mitchell | Republican | 1917-1920 | Mahaska County | |
| Warren Caldwell | Republican | 1921-1924 | Oskaloosa, Iowa | |
| Forrester Stanley | Republican | 1925-1932 | Mahaska County | |
| Louis Tuttle Shangle | Democrat | 1933-1935 | Mahaska County | Senator Shangle died in office in 1935. |
| Albert Earl Augustine | Democrat | 1936-1952 | Mahaska County | |
| Charles Emory Stewart | Republican | 1953-1956 | Mahaska County | Senator Stewart died in 1956 while seeking re-election. |
| Carroll McCurdy | Democratic | 1957-1960 | Mahaska County | |
| John Gray | Republican | 1961-1962 | Oskaloosa, Iowa | Senator Stanley died in office in 1962. |
| John L. Campbell | Republican | 1963-1964 | Oskaloosa, Iowa | Two senators from district 14 are listed on the Iowa Official Register for General Assembly 60. This is the combined result of redistricting and election cycles and affected multiple districts. |
| John Shoeman | Republican | 1963-1966 | Cass County | |
| David M. Stanley | Republican | 1967-1969 | Muscatine, Iowa | Senator Stanley resigned in 1969 to run for office in the US House of Representatives. |
| William Rabedeaux | Republican | 1970 | Wilton, Iowa | |
| Arthur Neu | Republican | 1971-1972 | Cass County | |
| Cloyd Robinson | Democrat | 1973-1980 | Linn County | |
| James D. Wells | Democrat | 1981-1982 | Linn County | |
| James Gallagher | Democrat | 1983-1984 | Black Hawk County | |
| Larry Murphy | Democrat | 1985-1996 | Fayette County | |
| Kathleen Rehberg | Republican | 1997-2002 | Buchanan County | |
| Michael Connolly | Democrat | 2003-2008 | Dubuque, Iowa | |
| Pam Jochum | Democrat | 2009-2012 | Dubuque, Iowa | |
| Amy Sinclair | Republican | 2013-2022 | Buchanan County | |
| Sarah Trone Garriott | Democrat | 2023-present | Dallas County | |

== Recent election results from statewide races ==
| Year | Office | Results |
|---|---|---|
| 2008 | President | McCain 54–45% |
| 2012 | President | Romney 58–42% |
| 2016 | President | Trump 50–42% |
| 2016 | Senate | Grassley 65–31% |
| 2018 | Governor | Reynolds 50–48% |
| 2018 | Attorney General | Miller 75–25% |
| 2018 | Secretary of State | Pate 53–45% |
| 2018 | Treasurer | Fitzgerald 55–43% |
| 2018 | Auditor | Sand 50–48% |
| 2020 | President | Biden 50–48% |
| 2020 | Senate | Ernst 50–47% |
| 2022 | Senate | Grassley 51–49% |
| 2022 | Governor | Reynolds 53–45% |
| 2022 | Attorney General | Miller 55–45% |
| 2022 | Secretary of State | Pate 56–44% |
| 2022 | Treasurer | Fitzgerald 54–46% |
| 2022 | Auditor | Sand 55–45% |
| 2024 | President | Trump 49.2–48.9% |

== Historical district boundaries ==
| Map | Description | Years effective | Notes |
|---|---|---|---|
| | Jackson County Jones County | 1846-1851 | From 1846 to 1857, district numbering was not utilized by the Iowa State Legislature. This convention was added with the passing of the 1857 Iowa Constitution. Numbering of districts pre-1857 is done as a matter of historic convenience. |
| | Mahaska | 1852-1855 | |
| | Washington County | 1856-1859 | |
| | Muscatine County | 1860-1863 | |
| | Louisa County | 1864-1873 | |
| | Keokuk County | 1874-1877 | |
| | Washington County | 1878-1883 | |
| | Mahaska County | 1884-1962 | |
| | Audubon County Cass County; Shelby County | 1963-1966 | |
| | Cedar County Muscatine County | 1967-1970 | |
| | Carroll County Crawford County; Monona County | 1971-1972 | In 1970, the Iowa Legislature passed an amendment to the Iowa Constitution setting forth the rules for legislative redistricting in order to abide by the rules established by the Reynolds v. Sims Supreme Court case. The first reapportionment map created by the Republican controlled legislature was deemed unconstitutional, but was still used for the 1970 election. |
| | Linn County (partial) | 1973-1982 | |
| | Black Hawk County (partial) Buchanan County (partial); Chickasaw County (partial); Fayette County | 1983-1992 | |
| | Black Hawk County (partial) Buchanan County (partial); Delaware County (partial); Fayette County (partial) | 1993-2002 | |
| | Dubuque County (partial): Dubuque | 2003-2012 | |
| | Clarke County Decatur County; Jasper County (partial): Elk Creek Township; Fairview Township; Lynn Grove Township; Palo Alto Township; Lynnville; Monroe; Reasnor; Sully; Marion County (partial): Excluding; Lake Prairie Township; Pella; Lucas County; Wayne County | 2013-2022 | |
| | Dallas County (partial): Adel Township; Bloomfield Township; Boone Township; Van Meter Township; Adel; Clive; Van Meter; Waukee; West Des Moines | 2023-present | |

== See also ==
- Iowa General Assembly
- Iowa Senate
