= Frank C. Byers =

American politician (1883–1962)

Member of the Iowa Senate from the 26th district
- In office January 9, 1933 – January 8, 1961

Member of the Iowa House of Representatives from the 48th district
- In office January 14, 1929 – January 8, 1933

Personal details
- Born: June 20, 1883 Alden, Iowa, U.S.
- Died: April 27, 1962 (aged 78) Cedar Rapids, Iowa, U.S.
- Party: Republican
- Spouse: Myra Lyon (m. 1909)
- Children: 3
- Education: Grinnell College; University of Iowa
- Occupation: Politician, lawyer

Frank C. Byers (June 20, 1883 – April 27, 1962) was an American lawyer and politician.

Byers was born in Alden, Iowa, on June 20, 1883. After graduating from high school in Alden, he attended Grinnell College and the University of Iowa College of Law. He passed the bar exam in 1904 and began practicing law the next year, in Cedar Rapids. Byers was also an assistant city attorney and assistant county attorney. Byers was affiliated with the Republican Party. Between 1924 and 1933, he served on the Cedar Rapids school board, including one year, 1927–1928, as board president. In 1928, Byers was elected to his first term on the Iowa House of Representatives for District 48. After concluding his second term as state representative in 1933, Byers was seated to the Iowa Senate for District 26. He retired in January 1961 as the longest continually serving Iowa state legislator.

In October 1909, Byers married Myra Lyon, with whom he raised two sons, Ganson and Frank Jr., and a daughter, Katherine. Katherine married Alden D. Avery, the son of Amplias Hale Avery, a legislative colleague of Byers'. Frank C. Byers died at the age of 78 on April 27, 1962.
