= Albert Earl Augustine =

American politician (1890–1975)

Member of the Iowa Senate from the 14th district
- In office December 21, 1936 – January 11, 1953
- Preceded by: Louis Tuttle Shangle
- Succeeded by: Charles Emory Stewart

Personal details
- Born: March 10, 1890 Delta, Iowa, U.S.
- Died: November 16, 1975 (aged 85) Oskaloosa, Iowa, U.S.
- Party: Democratic
- Spouse: Ruth Hull
- Children: 4
- Education: William Penn College; University of Iowa
- Occupation: Politician

Albert Earl Augustine (March 10, 1890 – November 16, 1975) was an American politician.

Augustine was born in Delta, Iowa, on March 10, 1890, to parents M. G. and Emma C. Augustine. He attended William Penn College and the University of Iowa. From 1928 to 1929, Augustine was superintendent of the Fox Chemical Experiment Farms in Des Moines. He then relocated to Russia between 1930 and 1931, where for eighteen months, he worked as an agricultural adviser.

Augustine was elected to five consecutive terms on the Iowa Senate as a Democrat, serving District 14 from December 21, 1936, to January 11, 1953. He lost the Democratic Party primary in the 1944 Iowa gubernatorial election to Nelson G. Kraschel.

Augustine died on November 16, 1975, in Oskaloosa.
