= 1986 Iowa Senate election =

- November 4, 1986

25 out of 50 seats in the Iowa State Senate 26 seats needed for a majority
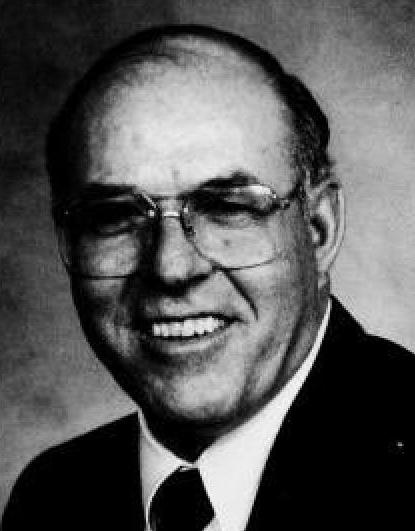

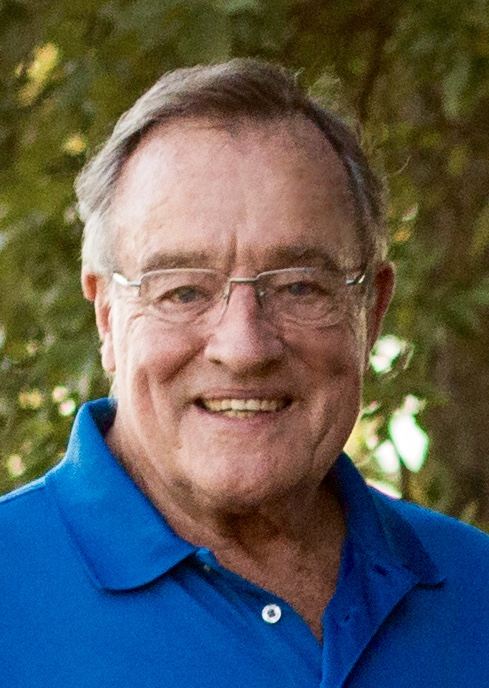
	Majority party	Minority party
Leader	Bill Hutchins	Calvin Hultman
Party	Democratic	Republican
Leader's seat	48th	47th
Last election	29	21
Seats before	29	21
Seats after	30	20
Seat change	▲1	▼1
Majority Leader before election
Bill Hutchins
Democratic
Elected Majority Leader
Bill Hutchins
Democratic

The 1986 Iowa State Senate elections took place as part of the biennial 1986 United States elections. Iowa voters elected state senators in half of the state senate's districts—the 25 odd-numbered state senate districts. State senators serve four-year terms in the Iowa State Senate, with half of the seats up for election each cycle. A statewide map of the 50 state Senate districts in the year 1986 is provided by the Iowa General Assembly here.

The primary election on June 3, 1986, determined which candidates appeared on the November 4, 1986 general election ballot. Primary election results can be obtained here. General election results can be obtained here.

Following the previous election in 1984, Democrats had control of the Iowa state Senate with 29 seats to Republicans' 21 seats.

To take control of the chamber from Democrats, the Republicans needed to net 5 Senate seats.

Democrats expanded their control of the Iowa State Senate following the 1986 general election, with Democrats holding 30 seats and Republicans having 20 seats after the election (a net gain of 1 seat for the Democrats).

== Summary of Results ==
- NOTE: The 25 even-numbered districts did not have elections in 1986 so they are not listed here.

State Senate District	Incumbent	Party	Elected Senator	Party
1st	Milo Colton	Dem	Al Sturgeon	Democratic
3rd	Douglas J. Ritsema	Rep	Wilmer Rensink	Republican
5th	Arne F. Waldstein	Rep	Linn Fuhrman	Republican
7th	C. Joseph Coleman	Dem	C. Joseph Coleman	Democratic
9th	Ray Taylor	Rep	Ray Taylor	Republican
11th	John Jensen	Rep	John Jensen	Republican
13th	Jim Lind	Rep	Jim Lind	Republican
15th	Arthur Gratias	Rep	Kenneth Daniel Scott	Democratic
17th	Joseph J. Welsh	Dem	Joseph J. Welsh	Democratic
19th	Norman J. Goodwin	Rep	Norman J. Goodwin	Republican
21st	Patrick J. Deluhery	Dem	Patrick J. Deluhery	Democratic
23rd	Arthur A. Small	Dem	Jean Hall Lloyd-Jones	Democratic
25th	Wally Horn	Dem	Wally Horn	Democratic
27th	Joe Brown	Dem	Richard J. Varn	Democratic
29th	Jack Rife	Rep	Jack Rife	Republican
31st	Gene Fraise	Dem	Gene Fraise	Democratic
33rd	Donald Gettings	Dem	Donald Gettings	Democratic
35th	Bill Dieleman	Dem	Bill Dieleman	Democratic
37th	Charles Hughes Bruner	Dem	Charles Hughes Bruner	Democratic
39th	William D. Palmer	Dem	William D. Palmer	Democratic
41st	Julia Gentleman	Rep	Julia Gentleman	Republican
43rd	Thomas Mann	Dem	Thomas Mann	Democratic
45th	James R. Riordan	Dem	James R. Riordan	Democratic
47th	Calvin Hultman	Rep	Calvin Hultman	Republican
49th	Jack W. Hester	Rep	Jack W. Hester	Republican

== Detailed Results ==
- Reminder: Only odd-numbered Iowa Senate seats were up for election in 1986; therefore, even-numbered seats did not have elections in 1986 & are not shown.
- Note: If a district does not list a primary, then that district did not have a competitive primary (i.e., there may have only been one candidate file for that district).

=== District 1 ===
Iowa Senate, District 1 General Election, 1986
Party	Candidate	Votes	%
Democratic	Al Sturgeon	8,983	52.7
Republican	Chuck Thomas	8,053	47.3
Total votes		17,036	100.0
Democratic hold			

=== District 3 ===
Iowa Senate, District 3 General Election, 1986
Party	Candidate	Votes	%
Republican	Wilmer Rensink	11,489	63.7
Democratic	Randy A. Riediger	6,533	36.3
Total votes		18,022	100.0
Republican hold			

=== District 5 ===
Iowa Senate, District 5 Republican Primary Election, 1986
Party	Candidate	Votes	%
Republican	Linn Fuhrman	1,839	51.9
Republican	Blaine Donaldson	1,707	48.1
Total votes		3,546	100.0

Iowa Senate, District 5 Democratic Primary Election, 1986
Party	Candidate	Votes	%
Democratic	Donald L. Schossow	1,012	51.6
Democratic	Andy Lynn Statz	950	48.4
Total votes		1,962	100.0

Iowa Senate, District 5 General Election, 1986
Party	Candidate	Votes	%
Republican	Linn Fuhrman	9,376	51.3
Democratic	Donald L. Schossow	8,903	48.7
Total votes		18,279	100.0
Republican hold			

=== District 7 ===
Iowa Senate, District 7 General Election, 1986
Party	Candidate	Votes	%
Democratic	C. Joseph Coleman (incumbent)	10,432	65.2
Republican	Lawrence Anderson	5,573	34.8
Total votes		16,005	100.0
Democratic hold			

=== District 9 ===
Iowa Senate, District 9 General Election, 1986
Party	Candidate	Votes	%
Republican	Ray Taylor (incumbent)	10,743	59.6
Democratic	John Clemons	7,286	40.4
Total votes		18,029	100.0
Republican hold			

=== District 11 ===
Iowa Senate, District 11 Republican Primary Election, 1986
Party	Candidate	Votes	%
Republican	John W. Jensen (incumbent)	2,392	53.4
Republican	Ralph Juhl	2,085	46.6
Total votes		4,477	100.0

Iowa Senate, District 11 General Election, 1986
Party	Candidate	Votes	%
Republican	John W. Jensen (incumbent)	11,157	100.0
Total votes		11,157	100.0
Republican hold			

=== District 13 ===
Iowa Senate, District 13 General Election, 1986
Party	Candidate	Votes	%
Republican	Jim Lind (incumbent)	10,477	56.3
Democratic	Charles P. Beard	8,127	43.7
Total votes		18,604	100.0
Republican hold			

=== District 15 ===
Iowa Senate, District 15 Republican Primary Election, 1986
Party	Candidate	Votes	%
Republican	Paul Bunge	1,969	56.1
Republican	Susie Darland	1,040	29.7
Republican	Gerald W. Slessor	500	14.2
Total votes		3,509	100.0

Iowa Senate, District 15 Democratic Primary Election, 1986
Party	Candidate	Votes	%
Democratic	Kenneth D. Scott	1,390	54.3
Democratic	Richard Goings	1,170	45.7
Total votes		2,560	100.0

Iowa Senate, District 15 General Election, 1986
Party	Candidate	Votes	%
Democratic	Kenneth D. Scott	9,726	50.6
Republican	Paul Bunge	9,481	49.4
Total votes		19,207	100.0
Democratic gain from Republican			

=== District 17 ===
Iowa Senate, District 17 General Election, 1986
Party	Candidate	Votes	%
Democratic	Joe J. Welsh (incumbent)	10,663	100.0
Total votes		10,663	100.0
Democratic hold			

=== District 19 ===
Iowa Senate, District 19 General Election, 1986
Party	Candidate	Votes	%
Republican	Norman J. Goodwin (incumbent)	9,492	57.7
Democratic	Robert Ryan	6,950	42.3
Total votes		16,442	100.0
Republican hold			

=== District 21 ===
Iowa Senate, District 21 General Election, 1986
Party	Candidate	Votes	%
Democratic	Patrick J. Deluhery (incumbent)	8,930	66.3
Republican	Carter LeBeau	4,530	33.7
Total votes		13,460	100.0
Democratic hold			

=== District 23 ===
Iowa Senate, District 23 General Election, 1986
Party	Candidate	Votes	%
Democratic	Jean Hall Lloyd-Jones	12,308	68.0
Republican	Michael McDonald	5,780	32.0
Total votes		18,088	100.0
Democratic hold			

=== District 25 ===
Iowa Senate, District 25 General Election, 1986
Party	Candidate	Votes	%
Democratic	Wally Horn (incumbent)	12,071	100.0
Total votes		12,071	100.0
Democratic hold			

=== District 27 ===
Iowa Senate, District 27 Republican Primary Election, 1986
Party	Candidate	Votes	%
Republican	Peggy Pinder	1,430	61.4
Republican	Michael R. Jay	898	38.6
Total votes		2,328	100.0

Iowa Senate, District 27 General Election, 1986
Party	Candidate	Votes	%
Democratic	Richard J. Varn	10,611	57.6
Republican	Peggy Pinder	7,824	42.4
Total votes		18,435	100.0
Democratic hold			

=== District 29 ===
Iowa Senate, District 29 General Election, 1986
Party	Candidate	Votes	%
Republican	Jack Rife (incumbent)	7,933	100.0
Total votes		7,933	100.0
Republican hold			

=== District 31 ===
Iowa Senate, District 31 General Election, 1986
Party	Candidate	Votes	%
Democratic	Gene Fraise (incumbent)	11,201	60.6
Republican	Guy W. Chase	7,293	39.4
Total votes		18,494	100.0
Democratic hold			

=== District 33 ===
Iowa Senate, District 33 General Election, 1986
Party	Candidate	Votes	%
Democratic	Donald Gettings (incumbent)	11,721	100.0
Total votes		11,721	100.0
Democratic hold			

=== District 35 ===
Iowa Senate, District 35 General Election, 1986
Party	Candidate	Votes	%
Democratic	Bill Dieleman (incumbent)	13,236	100.0
Total votes		13,236	100.0
Democratic hold			

=== District 37 ===
Iowa Senate, District 37 General Election, 1986
Party	Candidate	Votes	%
Democratic	Charles Bruner (incumbent)	10,647	60.7
Republican	Richard R. Vander Mey	6,888	39.3
Total votes		17,535	100.0
Democratic hold			

=== District 39 ===
Iowa Senate, District 39 General Election, 1986
Party	Candidate	Votes	%
Democratic	William D. Palmer (incumbent)	13,759	100.0
Total votes		13,759	100.0
Democratic hold			

=== District 41 ===
Iowa Senate, District 41 General Election, 1986
Party	Candidate	Votes	%
Republican	Julia Gentleman (incumbent)	11,885	56.6
Democratic	Denise J. Essman	9,107	43.4
Total votes		20,992	100.0
Republican hold			

=== District 43 ===
Iowa Senate, District 43 General Election, 1986
Party	Candidate	Votes	%
Democratic	Tom Mann (incumbent)	11,539	100.0
Total votes		11,539	100.0
Democratic hold			

=== District 45 ===
Iowa Senate, District 45 General Election, 1986
Party	Candidate	Votes	%
Democratic	James R. Riordan (incumbent)	10,969	56.3
Republican	Thomas J. Gratias	8,503	43.7
Total votes		19,472	100.0
Democratic hold			

=== District 47 ===
Iowa Senate, District 47 General Election, 1986
Party	Candidate	Votes	%
Republican	Calvin Hultman (incumbent)	11,756	100.0
Total votes		11,756	100.0
Republican hold			

=== District 49 ===
Iowa Senate, District 49 General Election, 1986
Party	Candidate	Votes	%
Republican	Jack W. Hester (incumbent)	10,991	100.0
Total votes		10,991	100.0
Republican hold			

== See also ==
- United States elections, 1986
- United States House of Representatives elections in Iowa, 1986
- Elections in Iowa
