= 1990 Iowa Senate election =

- November 6, 1990

25 out of 50 seats in the Iowa State Senate 26 seats needed for a majority
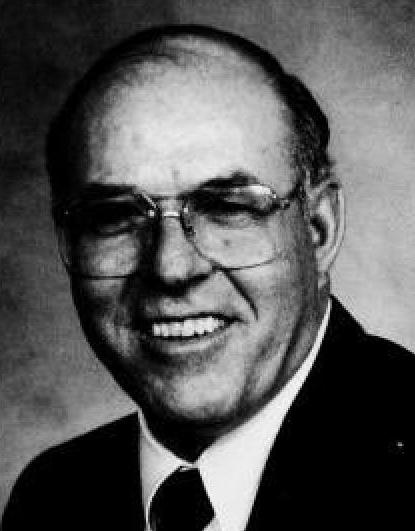

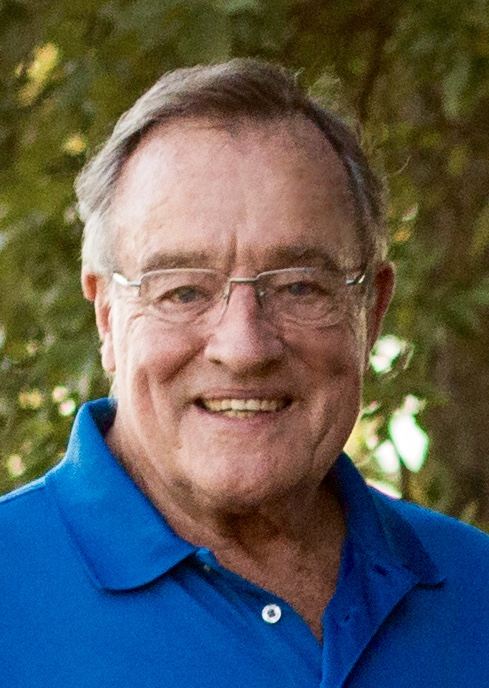
| | Majority party | Minority party |
|---|---|---|
| Leader | Bill Hutchins | Calvin Hultman |
| Party | Democratic | Republican |
| Leader's seat | 48th | 47th (retired) |
| Last election | 30 | 20 |
| Seats before | 30 | 20 |
| Seats after | 28 | 22 |
| Seat change | ▼2 | ▲2 |
Majority Leader before election
Bill Hutchins
Democratic
Elected Majority Leader
Bill Hutchins
Democratic

The 1990 Iowa State Senate elections took place as part of the biennial 1990 United States elections. Iowa voters elected state senators in half of the state senate's districts—the 25 odd-numbered state senate districts. State senators serve four-year terms in the Iowa State Senate, with half of the seats up for election each cycle. A statewide map of the 50 state Senate districts in the year 1990 is provided by the Iowa General Assembly here.

The primary election on June 5, 1990, determined which candidates appeared on the November 6, 1990 general election ballot. Primary election results can be obtained here. General election results can be obtained here.

The 1990 elections were the last in Iowa in which the Lieutenant Governor performed the duties of "President of the Senate." Starting on January 14, 1991, with the enactment of Article IV, section 18, of the Constitution of Iowa, the duties of Iowa's Lieutenant Governor no longer include presiding over the state Senate. The Majority Leader was instead the sitting Senate member who led the larger party. Following 1991, the President of the Iowa Senate would become a sitting member of the Senate.

Following the previous election in 1988, Democrats had control of the Iowa state Senate with 30 seats to Republicans' 20 seats.

To take control of the chamber from Democrats, the Republicans needed to net 6 Senate seats.

Democrats kept their control of the Iowa State Senate following the 1990 general election, with Democrats holding 28 seats and Republicans having 22 seats after the election (a net gain of 2 seats for the Republicans).

== Summary of Results ==
- NOTE: The 25 even-numbered districts did not have elections in 1990 so they are not listed here.

| State Senate District | Incumbent | Party | Elected Senator | Party |
|---|---|---|---|---|
| 1st | Al Sturgeon | Dem | Al Sturgeon | Democratic |
| 3rd | Wilmer Rensink | Rep | Wilmer Rensink | Republican |
| 5th | Linn Fuhrman | Rep | Linn Fuhrman | Republican |
| 7th | C. Joseph Coleman | Dem | James B. Kersten | Republican |
| 9th | Ray Taylor | Rep | Ray Taylor | Republican |
| 11th | John Jensen | Rep | John Jensen | Republican |
| 13th | Jim Lind | Rep | Jim Lind | Republican |
| 15th | Kenneth Daniel Scott | Dem | Allen Borlaug | Republican |
| 17th | Joseph J. Welsh | Dem | Joseph J. Welsh | Democratic |
| 19th | Norman J. Goodwin | Rep | Sheldon L. Rittmer | Republican |
| 21st | Patrick J. Deluhery | Dem | Patrick J. Deluhery | Democratic |
| 23rd | Jean Hall Lloyd-Jones | Dem | Jean Hall Lloyd-Jones | Democratic |
| 25th | Wally Horn | Dem | Wally Horn | Democratic |
| 27th | Richard J. Varn | Dem | Richard J. Varn | Democratic |
| 29th | Jack Rife | Rep | Jack Rife | Republican |
| 31st | Gene Fraise | Dem | Gene Fraise | Democratic |
| 33rd | Donald Gettings | Dem | Donald Gettings | Democratic |
| 35th | Bill Dieleman | Dem | Bill Dieleman | Democratic |
| 37th | Charles Hughes Bruner | Dem | Ralph Rosenberg | Democratic |
| 39th | William D. Palmer | Dem | William D. Palmer | Democratic |
| 41st | Julia Gentleman | Rep | Mary Kramer | Republican |
| 43rd | Thomas Mann | Dem | Florence Buhr | Democratic |
| 45th | James R. Riordan | Dem | James R. Riordan | Democratic |
| 47th | Calvin Hultman | Rep | Derryl McLaren | Republican |
| 49th | Jack W. Hester | Rep | Jack W. Hester | Republican |

== Detailed Results ==
- Reminder: Only odd-numbered Iowa Senate seats were up for election in 1990; therefore, even-numbered seats did not have elections in 1990 & are not shown.
- Note: If a district does not list a primary, then that district did not have a competitive primary (i.e., there may have only been one candidate file for that district).

=== District 1 ===
Iowa Senate, District 1 Democratic Primary Election, 1990
| Party | Candidate | Votes | % |
|---|---|---|---|
| Democratic | Al Sturgeon (incumbent) | 1,752 | 65.5 |
| Democratic | Milo Colton | 921 | 34.5 |
| Total votes | | 2,673 | 100.0 |

Iowa Senate, District 1 General Election, 1990
| Party | Candidate | Votes | % |
|---|---|---|---|
| Democratic | Al Sturgeon (incumbent) | 8,179 | 50.8 |
| Republican | Kathleen L. Hoffmann | 7,915 | 49.2 |
| Total votes | | 16,094 | 100.0 |
| Democratic hold | | | |

=== District 3 ===
Iowa Senate, District 3 General Election, 1990
| Party | Candidate | Votes | % |
|---|---|---|---|
| Republican | Wilmer Rensink (incumbent) | 14,002 | 100.0 |
| Total votes | | 14,002 | 100.0 |
| Republican hold | | | |

=== District 5 ===
Iowa Senate, District 5 General Election, 1990
| Party | Candidate | Votes | % |
|---|---|---|---|
| Republican | Linn Fuhrman (incumbent) | 10,353 | 58.3 |
| Democratic | Keith Baker | 7,397 | 41.7 |
| Total votes | | 17,750 | 100.0 |
| Republican hold | | | |

=== District 7 ===
Iowa Senate, District 7 General Election, 1990
| Party | Candidate | Votes | % |
|---|---|---|---|
| Republican | Jim Kersten | 8,819 | 50.5 |
| Democratic | C. Joseph Coleman (incumbent) | 8,641 | 49.5 |
| Total votes | | 17,460 | 100.0 |
| Republican gain from Democratic | | | |

=== District 9 ===
Iowa Senate, District 9 General Election, 1990
| Party | Candidate | Votes | % |
|---|---|---|---|
| Republican | Ray Taylor (incumbent) | 10,482 | 56.2 |
| Democratic | Sam Osborne | 8,178 | 43.8 |
| Total votes | | 18,660 | 100.0 |
| Republican hold | | | |

=== District 11 ===
Iowa Senate, District 11 General Election, 1990
| Party | Candidate | Votes | % |
|---|---|---|---|
| Republican | John W. Jensen (incumbent) | 10,364 | 59.7 |
| Democratic | Helen Kopsa | 6,989 | 40.3 |
| Total votes | | 17,353 | 100.0 |
| Republican hold | | | |

=== District 13 ===
Iowa Senate, District 13 General Election, 1990
| Party | Candidate | Votes | % |
|---|---|---|---|
| Republican | Jim Lind (incumbent) | 10,847 | 61.3 |
| Democratic | Abby Burns | 6,848 | 38.7 |
| Total votes | | 17,695 | 100.0 |
| Republican hold | | | |

=== District 15 ===
Iowa Senate, District 15 General Election, 1990
| Party | Candidate | Votes | % |
|---|---|---|---|
| Republican | Allen Borlaug | 9,998 | 51.9 |
| Democratic | Kenneth D. Scott (incumbent) | 9,280 | 48.1 |
| Total votes | | 19,278 | 100.0 |
| Republican gain from Democratic | | | |

=== District 17 ===
Iowa Senate, District 17 General Election, 1990
| Party | Candidate | Votes | % |
|---|---|---|---|
| Democratic | Joe J. Welsh (incumbent) | 11,996 | 92.3 |
| Independent | Ray Taylor | 1,000 | 7.7 |
| Total votes | | 12,996 | 100.0 |
| Democratic hold | | | |

=== District 19 ===
Iowa Senate, District 19 General Election, 1990
| Party | Candidate | Votes | % |
|---|---|---|---|
| Republican | Sheldon L. Rittmer | 9,631 | 53.9 |
| Democratic | Douglas Olmsted | 8,227 | 46.1 |
| Total votes | | 17,858 | 100.0 |
| Republican hold | | | |

=== District 21 ===
Iowa Senate, District 21 General Election, 1990
| Party | Candidate | Votes | % |
|---|---|---|---|
| Democratic | Patrick J. Deluhery (incumbent) | 8,266 | 100.0 |
| Total votes | | 8,266 | 100.0 |
| Democratic hold | | | |

=== District 23 ===
Iowa Senate, District 23 General Election, 1990
| Party | Candidate | Votes | % |
|---|---|---|---|
| Democratic | Jean Hall Lloyd-Jones (incumbent) | 16,959 | 100.0 |
| Total votes | | 16,959 | 100.0 |
| Democratic hold | | | |

=== District 25 ===
Iowa Senate, District 25 General Election, 1990
| Party | Candidate | Votes | % |
|---|---|---|---|
| Democratic | Wally Horn (incumbent) | 10,844 | 54.5 |
| Republican | Andy Hasley | 9,049 | 45.5 |
| Total votes | | 19,893 | 100.0 |
| Democratic hold | | | |

=== District 27 ===
Iowa Senate, District 27 General Election, 1990
| Party | Candidate | Votes | % |
|---|---|---|---|
| Democratic | Richard J. Varn (incumbent) | 12,657 | 62.0 |
| Republican | Charles V. Dunham | 7,767 | 38.0 |
| Total votes | | 20,424 | 100.0 |
| Democratic hold | | | |

=== District 29 ===
Iowa Senate, District 29 General Election, 1990
| Party | Candidate | Votes | % |
|---|---|---|---|
| Republican | Jack Rife (incumbent) | 8,700 | 55.8 |
| Democratic | Hugh Reed | 6,889 | 44.2 |
| Total votes | | 15,589 | 100.0 |
| Republican hold | | | |

=== District 31 ===
Iowa Senate, District 31 General Election, 1990
| Party | Candidate | Votes | % |
|---|---|---|---|
| Democratic | Gene Fraise (incumbent) | 10,645 | 60.3 |
| Republican | John H. Clark | 7,009 | 39.7 |
| Total votes | | 17,654 | 100.0 |
| Democratic hold | | | |

=== District 33 ===
Iowa Senate, District 33 General Election, 1990
| Party | Candidate | Votes | % |
|---|---|---|---|
| Democratic | Donald Gettings (incumbent) | 11,327 | 100.0 |
| Total votes | | 11,327 | 100.0 |
| Democratic hold | | | |

=== District 35 ===
Iowa Senate, District 35 General Election, 1990
| Party | Candidate | Votes | % |
|---|---|---|---|
| Democratic | Bill Dieleman (incumbent) | 14,340 | 100.0 |
| Total votes | | 14,340 | 100.0 |
| Democratic hold | | | |

=== District 37 ===
Iowa Senate, District 37 General Election, 1990
| Party | Candidate | Votes | % |
|---|---|---|---|
| Democratic | Ralph Rosenberg | 12,184 | 66.6 |
| Republican | Ray Jones | 6,104 | 33.4 |
| Total votes | | 18,288 | 100.0 |
| Democratic hold | | | |

=== District 39 ===
Iowa Senate, District 39 General Election, 1990
| Party | Candidate | Votes | % |
|---|---|---|---|
| Democratic | William D. Palmer (incumbent) | 16,219 | 100.0 |
| Total votes | | 16,219 | 100.0 |
| Democratic hold | | | |

=== District 41 ===
Iowa Senate, District 41 Republican Primary Election, 1990
| Party | Candidate | Votes | % |
|---|---|---|---|
| Republican | Mary Kramer | 2,147 | 64.5 |
| Republican | Mike McCann | 1,182 | 35.5 |
| Total votes | | 3,329 | 100.0 |

Iowa Senate, District 41 General Election, 1990
| Party | Candidate | Votes | % |
|---|---|---|---|
| Republican | Mary Kramer | 13,970 | 53.1 |
| Democratic | Tim Urban | 12,318 | 46.9 |
| Total votes | | 26,288 | 100.0 |
| Republican hold | | | |

=== District 43 ===
Iowa Senate, District 43 General Election, 1990
| Party | Candidate | Votes | % |
|---|---|---|---|
| Democratic | Florence Buhr | 12,510 | 100.0 |
| Total votes | | 12,510 | 100.0 |
| Democratic hold | | | |

=== District 45 ===
Iowa Senate, District 45 Democratic Primary Election, 1990
| Party | Candidate | Votes | % |
|---|---|---|---|
| Democratic | James R. Riordan (incumbent) | 3,888 | 70.1 |
| Democratic | Timothy J. Nixon | 1,656 | 29.9 |
| Total votes | | 5,544 | 100.0 |

Iowa Senate, District 45 General Election, 1990
| Party | Candidate | Votes | % |
|---|---|---|---|
| Democratic | James R. Riordan (incumbent) | 12,681 | 61.7 |
| Republican | Jerry D. Slater | 7,881 | 38.3 |
| Total votes | | 20,562 | 100.0 |
| Democratic hold | | | |

=== District 47 ===
Iowa Senate, District 47 General Election, 1990
| Party | Candidate | Votes | % |
|---|---|---|---|
| Republican | Derryl McLaren | 11,929 | 100.0 |
| Total votes | | 11,929 | 100.0 |
| Republican hold | | | |

=== District 49 ===
Iowa Senate, District 49 General Election, 1990
| Party | Candidate | Votes | % |
|---|---|---|---|
| Republican | Jack W. Hester (incumbent) | 10,052 | 57.1 |
| Democratic | John J. O'Brien | 7,549 | 42.9 |
| Total votes | | 17,601 | 100.0 |
| Republican hold | | | |

== See also ==
- United States elections, 1990
- United States House of Representatives elections in Iowa, 1990
- Elections in Iowa
