= 1982 Iowa Senate election =

- November 2, 1982

29 out of 50 seats in the Iowa State Senate 26 seats needed for a majority
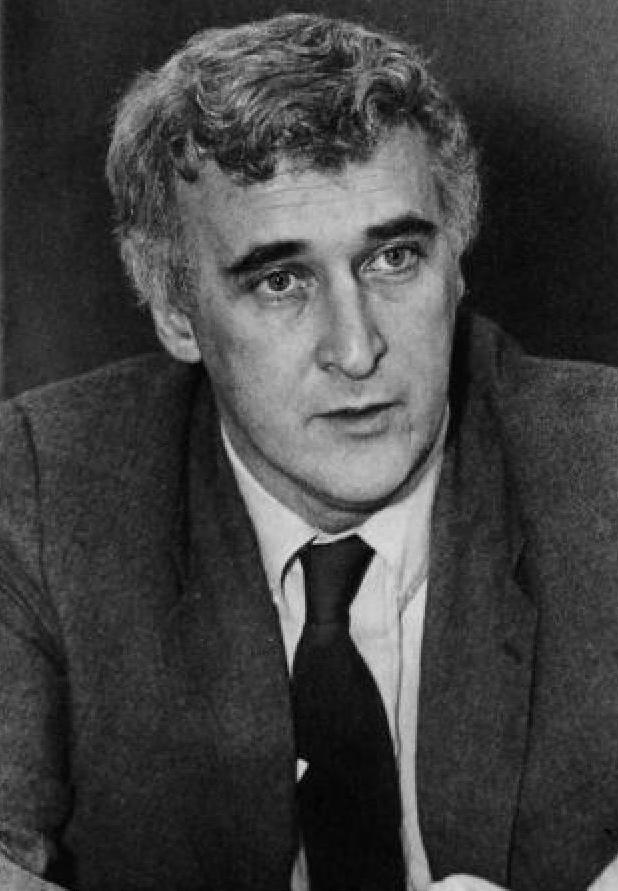

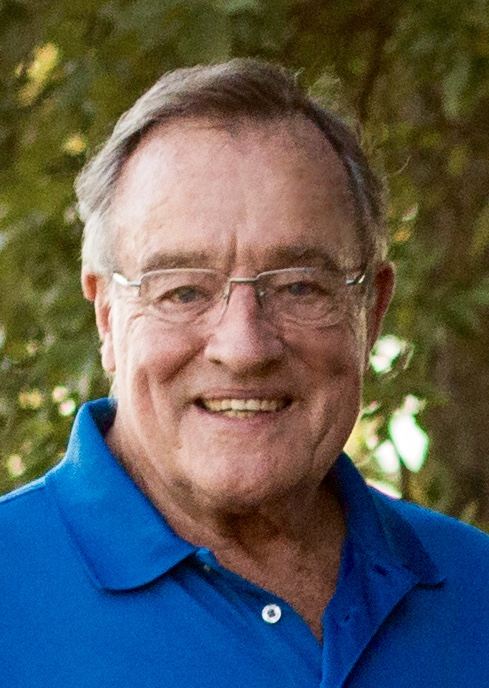
	Majority party	Minority party
Leader	Lowell Junkins	Calvin Hultman
Party	Democratic	Republican
Leader's seat	31st	47th
Last election	21	29
Seats before	21	29
Seats after	28	22
Seat change	▲7	▼7
Majority Leader before election
Calvin Hultman
Republican
Elected Majority Leader
Lowell Junkins
Democratic

The 1982 Iowa State Senate elections took place as part of the biennial 1982 United States elections. Iowa voters elected state senators in 29 of the state senate's 50 districts—all 25 of the odd-numbered seats were up for regularly scheduled elections to four-year terms and, due to the oddities of redistricting following the 1980 Census, four of the even-numbered seats were up as well. State senators serve four-year terms in the Iowa State Senate, with half of the seats traditionally up for election each cycle.

The Iowa General Assembly provides statewide maps of each district. To compare the effect of the 1981 redistricting process on the location of each district, contrast the previous map with the map used for 1982 elections.

The primary election on June 8, 1982, determined which candidates appeared on the November 2, 1982 general election ballot. Primary election results can be obtained here. General election results can be obtained here.

Following the previous election in 1980, Republicans had control of the Iowa state Senate with 29 seats to Democrats' 21 seats.

To take control of the chamber from Republicans, the Democrats needed to net 5 Senate seats.

Democrats flipped control of the Iowa State Senate following the 1982 general election, with Democrats holding 28 seats and Republicans having 22 seats after the election (a net gain of 7 seats for the Democrats).

In 1982, after winning his election in the forty-third senatorial district, Thomas Mann became the first Black person elected to the Iowa Senate.

== Summary of Results ==
- NOTE: 21 of the 25 even-numbered districts did not have elections in 1982 so they are not listed here.
- Also note, an asterisk (*) after a Senator's name indicates they were an incumbent re-elected, but to a new district number due to redistricting.

State Senate District	Incumbent	Party	Elected Senator	Party
1st	Lucas DeKoster	Rep	Milo Colton	Democratic
2nd	Richard Vande Hoef	Rep	Donald V. Doyle* (Note: Redistricted from district 26 to 2.)	Democratic
3rd	Arne F. Waldstein	Rep	Douglas J. Ritsema	Republican
5th	Ray Taylor	Rep	Arne F. Waldstein* (Note: Redistricted from district 3 to 5.)	Republican
6th	Alvin V. Miller	Dem	Lee Warren Holt	Republican
7th	Arthur Gratias	Rep	C. Joseph Coleman* (Note: Redistricted from district 23 to 7.)	Democratic
9th	Dale L. Tieden	Rep	Ray Taylor* (Note: Redistricted from district 5 to 9.)	Republican
11th	Stephen W. Bisenius	Rep	John W. Jensen* (Note: Redistricted from district 19 to 11.)	Republican
13th	Arthur R. Kudart	Rep	Thomas A. Lind	Republican
15th	Robert Rush	Dem	Arthur Gratias* (Note: Redistricted from district 7 to 15.)	Republican
16th	James V. Gallagher	Dem	Dale L. Tieden* (Note: Redistricted from district 9 to 16.)	Republican
17th	Richard L. Comito	Rep	Joseph J. Welsh	Democratic
19th	John W. Jensen	Rep	Norman J. Goodwin* (Note: Redistricted from district 39 to 19.)	Republican
21st	John S. Murray	Rep	Patrick J. Deluhery* (Note: Redistricted from district 41 to 21.)	Democratic
23rd	C. Joseph Coleman	Dem	Arthur A. Small* (Note: Redistricted from district 37 to 23.)	Democratic
24th	Elvie C. Dreeszen	Rep	Hurley Hall	Democratic
25th	Clarence S. Carney	Rep	Wally Horn	Democratic
27th	Jack W. Hester	Rep	Joe Brown* (Note: Redistricted from district 35 to 27.)	Democratic
29th	Norman Rodgers	Dem	Jack Rife	Republican
31st	Gary L. Baugher	Rep	Lowell Junkins* (Note: Redistricted from district 43 to 31.)	Democratic
33rd	Julia Gentleman	Rep	Donald Gettings	Democratic
35th	Joe Brown	Dem	Bill Dieleman	Democratic
37th	Arthur A. Small	Dem	Charles Hughes Bruner	Democratic
39th	Norman J. Goodwin	Rep	William D. Palmer* (Note: Redistricted from district 32 to 39.)	Democratic
41st	Patrick J. Deluhery	Dem	Julia Gentleman* (Note: Redistricted from district 33 to 41.)	Republican
43rd	Lowell Junkins	Dem	Thomas Mann	Democratic
45th	Sue Yenger	Rep	Norman Rodgers* (Note: Redistricted from district 29 to 45.)	Democratic
47th	Richard Ramsey	Rep	Calvin Hultman* (Note: Redistricted from district 49 to 47.)	Republican
49th	Calvin Hultman	Rep	Jack W. Hester* (Note: Redistricted from district 27 to 49.)	Republican

== Detailed Results ==
- Reminder: All odd-numbered Iowa Senate seats were up for election to full four-year terms in 1982, as well as four even-numbered seats that had elections for two-year terms due to the oddities caused by redistricting. All other even-numbered districts did not have elections in 1982 & are not shown.
- Note: If a district does not list a primary, then that district did not have a competitive primary (i.e., there may have only been one candidate file for that district).

=== District 1 ===
Iowa Senate, District 1 General Election, 1982
Party	Candidate	Votes	%
Democratic	Milo Colton	10,258	60.5
Republican	Clarence S. Carney (incumbent) (Note: Redistricted from district 25 to 1.)	6,687	39.5
Total votes		16,945	100.0
Democratic gain from Republican			

=== District 2 ===
Iowa Senate, District 2 General Election, 1982
Party	Candidate	Votes	%
Democratic	Donald V. Doyle (incumbent)	9,606	51.8
Republican	Elvie Dreeszen (incumbent) (Note: Redistricted from district 24 to 2.)	8,938	48.2
Total votes		18,544	100.0
Democratic gain from Republican			

=== District 3 ===
Iowa Senate, District 3 General Election, 1982
Party	Candidate	Votes	%
Republican	Douglas Ritsema	12,046	97.0
Independent	Garry De Young	367	3.0
Total votes		12,413	100.0
Republican hold			

=== District 5 ===
Iowa Senate, District 5 General Election, 1982
Party	Candidate	Votes	%
Republican	Arne Waldstein (incumbent)	10,270	51.9
Democratic	Tom Grau	9,524	48.1
Total votes		19,794	100.0
Republican hold			

=== District 6 ===
Iowa Senate, District 6 Democratic Primary Election, 1982
Party	Candidate	Votes	%
Democratic	Dick Kibbie	1,678	67.9
Democratic	Robert A. Krause	792	32.1
Total votes		2,470	100.0

Iowa Senate, District 6 General Election, 1982
Party	Candidate	Votes	%
Republican	Lee Holt	10,444	51.7
Democratic	Dick Kibbie	9,768	48.3
Total votes		20,212	100.0
Republican gain from Democratic			

=== District 7 ===
Iowa Senate, District 7 General Election, 1982
Party	Candidate	Votes	%
Democratic	C. Joseph Coleman (incumbent)	10,946	56.2
Republican	Dave Jones	8,534	43.8
Total votes		19,480	100.0
Democratic gain from Republican			

=== District 9 ===
Iowa Senate, District 9 Democratic Primary Election, 1982
Party	Candidate	Votes	%
Democratic	Darlene Riggs	1,785	55.9
Democratic	John Clemons	1,407	44.1
Total votes		3,192	100.0

Iowa Senate, District 9 General Election, 1982
Party	Candidate	Votes	%
Republican	Ray Taylor (incumbent)	10,965	55.2
Democratic	Darlene Riggs	8,905	44.8
Total votes		19,870	100.0
Republican hold			

=== District 11 ===
Iowa Senate, District 11 General Election, 1982
Party	Candidate	Votes	%
Republican	John W. Jensen (incumbent)	14,846	100.0
Total votes		14,846	100.0
Republican hold			

=== District 13 ===
Iowa Senate, District 13 General Election, 1982
Party	Candidate	Votes	%
Republican	Thomas A. Lind	12,263	53.4
Democratic	Frank Alexander	10,693	46.6
Total votes		22,956	100.0
Republican hold			

=== District 15 ===
Iowa Senate, District 15 General Election, 1982
Party	Candidate	Votes	%
Republican	Arthur Gratias (incumbent)	12,327	57.5
Democratic	Gary Bernau	9,103	42.5
Total votes		21,430	100.0
Republican gain from Democratic			

=== District 16 ===
Iowa Senate, District 16 General Election, 1982
Party	Candidate	Votes	%
Republican	Dale L. Tieden (incumbent)	13,045	100.0
Total votes		13,045	100.0
Republican gain from Democratic			

=== District 17 ===
Iowa Senate, District 17 General Election, 1982
Party	Candidate	Votes	%
Democratic	Joe J. Welsh	11,027	100.0
Total votes		11,027	100.0
Democratic gain from Republican			

=== District 19 ===
Iowa Senate, District 19 General Election, 1982
Party	Candidate	Votes	%
Republican	Norman J. Goodwin (incumbent)	11,044	58.2
Democratic	Patrick Leo Mullen	7,938	41.8
Total votes		18,982	100.0
Republican hold			

=== District 21 ===
Iowa Senate, District 21 General Election, 1982
Party	Candidate	Votes	%
Democratic	Patrick J. Deluhery (incumbent)	10,827	63.0
Republican	Gloria Grilk	6,358	37.0
Total votes		17,185	100.0
Democratic gain from Republican			

=== District 23 ===
Iowa Senate, District 23 General Election, 1982
Party	Candidate	Votes	%
Democratic	Arthur A. Small (incumbent)	14,694	64.2
Republican	Phillip E. Jacks	8,196	35.8
Total votes		22,890	100.0
Democratic hold			

=== District 24 ===
Iowa Senate, District 24 General Election, 1982
Party	Candidate	Votes	%
Democratic	Hurley W. Hall	11,451	56.4
Republican	Harvey W. Fascher	8,838	43.6
Total votes		20,289	100.0
Democratic gain from Republican			

=== District 25 ===
Iowa Senate, District 25 General Election, 1982
Party	Candidate	Votes	%
Democratic	Wally E. Horn	11,502	56.4
Republican	Robert M.L. Johnson	8,889	43.6
Total votes		20,391	100.0
Democratic gain from Republican			

=== District 27 ===
Iowa Senate, District 27 Republican Primary Election, 1982
Party	Candidate	Votes	%
Republican	Donald L. Kirkpatrick	1,112	49.0
Republican	Eugene Long	676	29.8
Republican	Benita Dilley	480	21.2
Total votes		2,268	100.0

Iowa Senate, District 27 General Election, 1982
Party	Candidate	Votes	%
Democratic	Joe Brown (incumbent)	11,179	52.7
Republican	Donald L. Kirkpatrick	10,023	47.3
Total votes		21,202	100.0
Democratic gain from Republican			

=== District 29 ===
Iowa Senate, District 29 Republican Primary Election, 1982
Party	Candidate	Votes	%
Republican	Jack Rife	1,194	60.2
Republican	James Bryson Clements	791	39.8
Total votes		1,985	100.0

Iowa Senate, District 29 General Election, 1982
Party	Candidate	Votes	%
Republican	Jack Rife	8,841	54.1
Democratic	Michael E. Brown	7,152	43.7
Independent	Otto Nealson	356	2.2
Total votes		16,349	100.0
Republican gain from Democratic			

=== District 31 ===
Iowa Senate, District 31 General Election, 1982
Party	Candidate	Votes	%
Democratic	Lowell Junkins (incumbent)	11,597	100.0
Total votes		11,597	100.0
Democratic gain from Republican			

=== District 33 ===
Iowa Senate, District 33 General Election, 1982
Party	Candidate	Votes	%
Democratic	Don E. Gettings	11,478	55.1
Republican	Sue Yenger (incumbent) (Note: Redistricted from district 45 to 33.)	9,354	44.9
Total votes		20,832	100.0
Democratic gain from Republican			

=== District 35 ===
Iowa Senate, District 35 General Election, 1982
Party	Candidate	Votes	%
Democratic	Bill Dieleman	11,757	58.9
Republican	Norman Roorda	8,216	41.1
Total votes		19,973	100.0
Democratic hold			

=== District 37 ===
Iowa Senate, District 37 General Election, 1982
Party	Candidate	Votes	%
Democratic	Charles Bruner	14,218	63.5
Republican	Marvin J. Walter	8,159	36.5
Total votes		22,377	100.0
Democratic hold			

=== District 39 ===
Iowa Senate, District 39 General Election, 1982
Party	Candidate	Votes	%
Democratic	William D. Palmer (incumbent)	12,049	56.8
Republican	Gary L. Baugher (incumbent) (Note: Redistricted from district 31 to 39.)	9,175	43.2
Total votes		21,224	100.0
Democratic gain from Republican			

=== District 41 ===
Iowa Senate, District 41 General Election, 1982
Party	Candidate	Votes	%
Republican	Julia Gentleman (incumbent)	13,292	57.1
Democratic	Michael B. Heller	9,969	42.9
Total votes		23,261	100.0
Republican gain from Democratic			

=== District 43 ===
Iowa Senate, District 43 Democratic Primary Election, 1982
Party	Candidate	Votes	%
Democratic	Tom Mann, Jr.	2,785	41.7
Democratic	Bobby Baker	1,889	28.3
Democratic	George Wennerberg	1,079	16.1
Democratic	Carlie Brien	926	13.9
Total votes		6,679	100.0

Iowa Senate, District 43 General Election, 1982
Party	Candidate	Votes	%
Democratic	Tom Mann, Jr.	11,516	57.0
Republican	Jo Ann Trucano	8,704	43.0
Total votes		20,220	100.0
Democratic hold			

=== District 45 ===
Iowa Senate, District 45 General Election, 1982
Party	Candidate	Votes	%
Democratic	Norman Rodgers (incumbent)	12,375	57.2
Republican	Robert M. Phillips, Sr.	9,252	42.8
Total votes		21,627	100.0
Democratic gain from Republican			

=== District 47 ===
Iowa Senate, District 47 General Election, 1982
Party	Candidate	Votes	%
Republican	Calvin Hultman (incumbent)	10,197	60.5
Democratic	John M. Kuster	6,654	39.5
Total votes		16,851	100.0
Republican hold			

=== District 49 ===
Iowa Senate, District 49 General Election, 1982
Party	Candidate	Votes	%
Republican	Jack W. Hester (incumbent)	10,090	54.7
Democratic	Donald J. Sonntag	8,354	45.3
Total votes		18,444	100.0
Republican hold			

== See also ==
- United States elections, 1982
- United States House of Representatives elections in Iowa, 1982
- Elections in Iowa
