= Jack Hester =

Jack Hester may refer to:

- Jack Hester (footballer) (1922–1999), Australian rules footballer
- Jack W. Hester (1929–1999), American farmer and politician in Iowa
