= Sue Yenger =

American politician (1938–2022)

Member of the Iowa Senate from the 45th district
- In office January 8, 1979 – January 9, 1983
- Preceded by: Gene W. Glenn
- Succeeded by: Don E. Gettings

Personal details
- Born: Suzanne Peck; August 5, 1938 Ottumwa, Iowa, U.S.
- Died: February 12, 2022 (aged 83) Ottumwa, Iowa, U.S.
- Party: Republican
- Spouse: Jim Yenger
- Children: 2

Suzanne Yenger (née Peck; August 5, 1938 – February 12, 2022) was an American politician from the state of Iowa who served as a Republican in the Iowa Senate for Ottumwa's 45th Senatorial District from 1979 to 1983.

== Personal life ==
Yenger was born in Ottumwa, Wapello County, Iowa in 1938 to Bernice and James F. Peck. She graduated from Ottumwa High School in 1956, then attended Ottumwa Heights College to 1958, and finally Parsons College to 1961, where she received her B B.A. Yenger worked in Iowa's educational system until her retirement. She wed in 1959 and had two children. Yenger died on February 12, 2022.

== Electoral history ==
=== 1978 ===
Iowa Senate, District 45 General Election, 1978
Party	Candidate	Votes	%
Republican	Sue Yenger	8,387	51.6
Democratic	Gene W. Glenn (incumbent)	7,860	48.4
Total votes		16,247	100.0
Republican gain from Democratic			

=== 1982 ===
Iowa Senate, District 33 General Election, 1982
Party	Candidate	Votes	%
Democratic	Don E. Gettings	11,478	55.1
Republican	Sue Yenger (incumbent) (Note: Redistricted from district 45 to 33.)	9,354	44.9
Total votes		20,832	100.0
Democratic gain from Republican			

=== Notes ===
Iowa Senate
Preceded by Gene W. Glenn	45th district 1979–1983	Succeeded by Don Gettings
