= Robert Dvorsky =

American politician

Robert E. Dvorsky
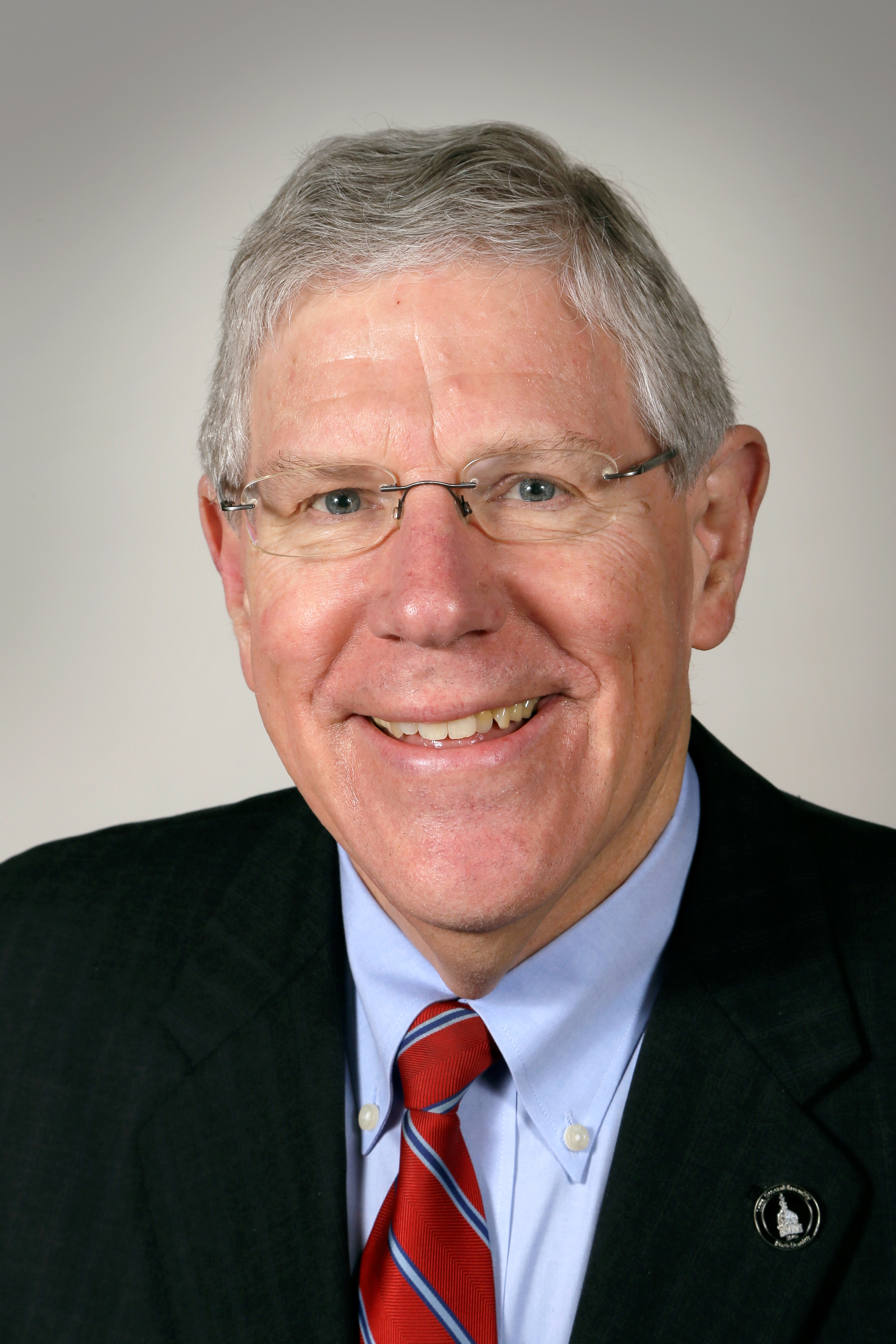

Member of the Iowa Senate from the 37th district 25th (1995–2003)
- In office January 9, 1995 – January 14, 2019
- Preceded by: Richard F. Drake
- Succeeded by: Zach Wahls

Member of the Iowa House of Representatives from the 49th district 54th (1987–1993)
- In office January 12, 1987 – January 9, 1995
- Preceded by: Richard Varn
- Succeeded by: Richard E. Myers

Personal details
- Born: August 18, 1948 (age 78) Burlington, Iowa, U.S.
- Party: Democratic
- Spouse: Susan Dvorsky
- Children: Annie Dvorsky, Caroline Dvorsky
- Education: University of Iowa
- Occupation: Executive Officer, 6th Judicial District, Department of Correctional Services
- Website: Dvorsky's website

Robert E. Dvorsky (born August 18, 1948) is a former Iowa State Senator from the 37th District (previously numbered the 15th District and 25th District). A Democrat, he received his BS and MPA from the University of Iowa and is a retired executive officer for the 6th Judicial District, Department of Correctional Services.

== Early life and education ==
Senator Dvorksy was born in Burlington, Iowa in 1948. Dvorsky went to high school at University High School in Iowa City, and upon graduation enrolled at the University of Iowa receiving his Bachelor of Science and later his Master of Public Administration.

== Iowa Legislature ==
Dvorsky currently serves on several committees in the Iowa Senate - the Education committee; the Rebuild Iowa committee; the Rules and Administration committee; and the Appropriations committee, where he is chair. His prior political experience includes serving as a representative in the Iowa House from 1987 to 1995, serving as the Mason City Superintendent of Recreation from 1973 to 1979, and serving on the Coralville City Council from 1979 to 1986.

Dvorsky was re-elected in 2006 with 19,027 votes, running unopposed.

Dvorsky announced his retirement in 2018 and was succeeded by activist Zach Wahls, a fellow Democrat.

Iowa House of Representatives
Preceded by Richard Varn	54th District; 1987 – 1993	Succeeded by Richard Running
Preceded by Kathleen Chapman	49th District; 1993 – 1994	Succeeded by Dick Myers
Iowa Senate
Preceded by Richard Drake	25th District; 1994 – 2003	Succeeded by Daryl Beall
Preceded by Betty Soukup	15th District; 2003 – present	Succeeded by Incumbent
