= Senator Colton =

Senator Colton may refer to:

- Don B. Colton (1876–1952), Utah State Senate
- Eben Pomeroy Colton (1829–1895), Vermont State Senate
- Milo Colton (born 1943), Iowa State Senate
