= Kevin Kinney =

Kevin Kinney may refer to:

- Kevn Kinney (born 1961), American vocalist and guitarist
- Kevin Kinney (politician) (born 1963), Iowa State Senator
