= Iowa's 90th House of Representatives district =

American legislative district

House District 90
- Type: District of the Lower house
- Location: Iowa
- Representative: Adam Zabner
- Parent organization: Iowa General Assembly

The 90th District of the Iowa House of Representatives in the state of Iowa. It is currently composed of part of Johnson County.

== Current elected officials ==
Adam Zabner is the representative currently representing the district.

== Past representatives ==
The district has previously been represented by:

- Charles Strothman, 1971–1973
- Mattie Harper, 1973–1977
- Donald Gettings, 1977–1983
- Robert Skow, 1983–1989
- David Hibbard, 1989–1993
- David F. Schrader, 1993–2003
- John Whitaker, 2003–2009
- Curtis Hanson, 2009–2013
- Cindy Winckler, 2013–2022
- Adam Zabner, 2023-present
