= David Lord (politician) =

American politician (1934–2005)

David George Lord (December 4, 1934 – July 26, 2005) was an American politician.

David Lord was born on a farm in Madison County, near Lorimor, Iowa, on December 4, 1934, to parents Colin Wilfred and Vera Robinett Lord, and educated in a one-room schoolhouse until the eighth grade. Upon graduating from Winterset High School of Winterset, Iowa, in 1953, Lord pursued a bachelor's degree in education from Iowa State University.

Lord served for 21 years in the Iowa National Guard, and later moved to Perry, Iowa, where he owned the Lord's Men and Boys Clothing Store and the Four-Seasons Car Wash and Mini-Storage for 25 and 26 years, respectively. Lord was a member of the Perry Community School Board, the Perry Industrial Development Board, the Brenton Bank Board, the Dallas County Hospital Foundation Board, the Iowa Retail Clothiers Board, the Perry Chamber of Commerce, the Rotary Club, the Dallas County Farm Bureau, and the Grimes Maranatha Baptist Church. Lord, a Republican, was elected to three consecutive terms on the Iowa House of Representatives from January 9, 1995, to January 7, 2001, for District 77. He won a 2002 special election to replace Jo Ann M. Johnson on the Iowa Senate, assumed the District 39 seat on February 25, 2002, and served the remainder of Johnson's term until January 12, 2003.

Lord married Maizie Holmes (May 3, 1934 – December 27, 2017) on September 8, 1957. The couple raised four sons. David Lord died on July 26, 2005, at the age of 70.
