= Jo Ann Johnson =

American politician (born 1949)

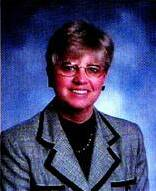

Member of the Iowa Senate from the 39th district
- In office January 9, 1995 – January 22, 2002
- Preceded by: James Riordan
- Succeeded by: David Lord

Personal details
- Born: Jo Ann M. Dinkla; April 24, 1949 (age 77) Massena, Iowa
- Party: Republican

Jo Ann M. Johnson (born April 24, 1949) is an American politician.

Jo Ann Dinkla was born to parents Elmer and Arlene Dinkla in Massena, Iowa, on April 24, 1949. Her younger brother is Dwight Dinkla. Jo Ann Dinkla graduated from Adair-Casey High School in 1967, and earned a bachelor of arts in education from the University of Northern Iowa in 1971. That year, she married Craig Douglas, with whom she raised a daughter and a son.

Jo Ann Douglas worked as a farmer, teacher and coach, served on the Adair-Casey school board and the Adair County Republican Central Committee, and was a member of Jim Ross Lightfoot's campaign staff from 1984 to 1990. She was elected to her first term on the Iowa Senate in 1994, and served District 39. By the start of her second term in 1999, she had moved to Dallas County, remarried to Brian Johnson, and became known as Jo Ann Johnson. Johnson stepped down from the Iowa Senate on January 22, 2002, and David Lord won a special election to serve the remainder of Johnson's term in office.
