= Arne Waldstein =

American politician

Member of the Iowa Senate from the 5th district
- In office January 10, 1983 – January 11, 1987
- Preceded by: Ray Taylor
- Succeeded by: Linn Fuhrman

Member of the Iowa Senate from the 3rd district
- In office January 8, 1979 – January 9, 1983
- Preceded by: Warren Curtis
- Succeeded by: Douglas Ritsema

Personal details
- Born: January 17, 1925 Brooke Township, Buena Vista County, Iowa
- Died: February 8, 2014 (aged 89) Waverly, Iowa
- Party: Republican

Arne F. Waldstein (January 17, 1925 – February 8, 2014) was an American politician who served in the Iowa Senate from 1979 to 1987.

He died on February 8, 2014, in Waverly, Iowa at age 89.
