= Frank Bissell (politician) =

American politician (1878–1970)

Member of the Iowa Senate from the 17th district
- In office January 14, 1929 – January 8, 1933
- Preceded by: Redfield Clipper Mills
- Succeeded by: George M. Hopkins

Personal details
- Born: January 12, 1878 Cass County, Iowa, U.S.
- Died: June 23, 1970 (aged 92) Grinnell, Iowa, U.S.
- Party: Republican
- Occupation: Politician, farmer

Frank Bissell (January 12, 1878 – June 23, 1970) was an American politician. He was born on the family farm in Cass County, Iowa, on January 12, 1878. He was a farmer and laborer until June 1905 when he moved to Dexter, Iowa, and began working in agricultural real estate. He was elected to a single term on the Iowa Senate in 1928 as a Republican representing District 17, which at the time included Dallas, Guthrie and Audubon counties. After serving as a state senator for four years, he moved to Creston in 1936, and later retired from real estate. He died at Friendship Manor, a nursing home in Grinnell on June 23, 1970.
