= Arlyn E. Danker =

American politician (1927–2016)

Member of the Iowa House of Representatives for the 54th district
- In office 1973–1983

Personal details
- Born: May 31, 1927 Council Bluffs, Iowa, U.S.
- Died: January 10, 2016 (aged 88) Minden, Iowa, U.S.
- Party: Republican
- Occupation: farmer

Arlyn E. Danker (May 31, 1927 – January 10, 2016) was an American politician in the state of Iowa.

Danker was born in Council Bluffs, Iowa in 1927. After graduating high school, he became a farmer, livestock producer and feeder. In 1948, he married Lois Mauer, and with her has two children. Danker served in the Iowa House of Representatives from 1973 to 1983, for the 54th district, as a Republican. In the United States House of Representatives elections, 1982, Danker unsuccessfully ran against Tom Harkin to represent the 5th congressional district. He also served for many years on the Pottawattamie County Board of Supervisors. Danker died on January 10, 2016.
