= Joshua Meggers =

American politician (born 1980)

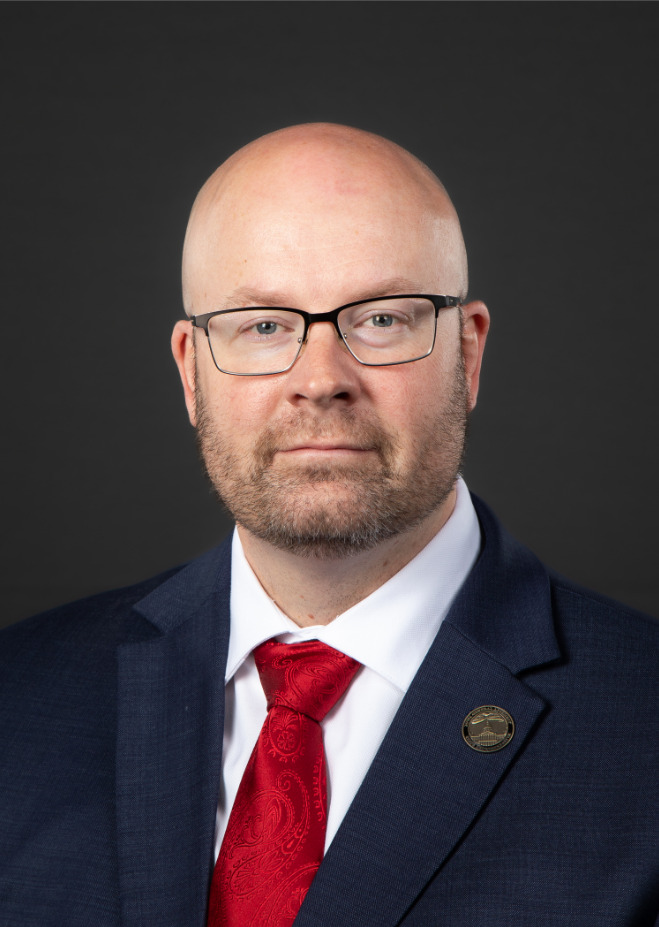

Member of the Iowa House of Representatives from the 54th district
- Incumbent
- Assumed office January 9, 2023
- Preceded by: Shannon Latham (redistricting)

Personal details
- Born: May 21, 1980 (age 46) Cedar Falls, Iowa, U.S.
- Party: Republican
- Spouse: Danielle
- Children: 1
- Education: Upper Iowa University
- Occupation: State trooper

Joshua Meggers (born 1980) is an American politician and police officer who has represented the 54th district in the Iowa House of Representatives since January 2023, which consists of Hardin and Grundy counties, as well as parts of western Black Hawk County. He is a member of the Republican Party.

== Early life ==
Meggers was born in 1980 in Cedar Falls, Iowa, and was raised in Buckingham, Iowa. He graduated from Hudson High School in 1999, and received a bachelor's degree in criminology from Upper Iowa University.

== Political career ==
Following decennial redistricting in 2021, Meggers announced his bid to run for the open 54th district seat in the Iowa House of Representatives in January 2022. He won the Republican primary on June 7, 2022, defeating Robert Nazario, a former merchant marine, by over 400 votes, and ran unopposed in the general election on November 8, winning with 98.5 percent of the vote. He assumed office on January 9, 2023.

Meggers endorsed Ron DeSantis for president in 2023.

In 2024, Meggers filed to run for reelection. He defeated Jody Anderson, a former Iowa Falls city manager, by over 800 votes in the Republican primaries on June 4, 2024, and won unopposed in the general election on November 5, 2024.

Meggers is a member of the Agriculture, Public Safety, Transportation, Ways & Means, and Labor & Workforce committees, the lattermost of which he currently serves as vice chair. Meggers was a member of the Economic Growth and Technology Committee until January 8, 2024.

Meggers has said that his priorities include public education, lowering corporate taxes and incentivizing recruitment for emergency service departments. He is a supporter of the Second Amendment.

== Personal life ==
Meggers has served as a state trooper with the Iowa State Patrol since 2005, having previously served with the Belle Plaine Police Department. His wife Danielle is a sergeant for the Black Hawk County Sheriff's Office. They have one daughter. He resides with his family in Grundy Center, Iowa.

On October 3, 2025, Meggers was hospitalized after his patrol vehicle was hit by a drunk driver that he was pursuing.

== Electoral history ==
Election	Political result	Candidate	Party	Votes	%
Iowa House of Representatives Republican primary elections, 2022; District 54; Turnout: 3,039	Republican (newly redistricted)	Joshua Meggers	Republican	1,736	57.1
Iowa House of Representatives Republican primary elections, 2022; District 54; Turnout: 3,039	Republican (newly redistricted)	Robert Nazario	Republican	1,297	42.7
Iowa House of Representatives Republican primary elections, 2022; District 54; Turnout: 3,039	Republican (newly redistricted)	Other/Write-in votes		6	0.2
Iowa House of Representatives general elections, 2022; District 54; Turnout: 10,958	Republican (newly redistricted)	Joshua Meggers	Republican	10,799	98.5
Iowa House of Representatives general elections, 2022; District 54; Turnout: 10,958	Republican (newly redistricted)	Other/Write-in votes		159	1.5
