= Henry H. Williams =

American politician (1813–1890)

Henry H. Williams (5 April 1813 – 12 February 1890) was an American politician.

Williams was born in Cumberland County, Kentucky on 5 April 1813. He lived for a time in Martinsville, Indiana, then settled in Burlington, Iowa in 1837. Williams relocated to Eddyville in 1844. Williams met and married his first wife while a resident of Indiana. After she died, he married Nancy Elliott. Elliott died in 1851, and Williams later married R. J. Johnson from Eddyville.

Williams was affiliated with the Democratic Party, and despite residing in the Republican-dominated District 17, was elected to the Iowa Senate from 1860 to 1864. He died on 12 February 1890.
