= Mattie Harper =

American politician (1923–1977)

Member of the Iowa House of Representatives from the 90th district
- In office January 8, 1973 – April 22, 1977
- Preceded by: Charles F. Strothman
- Succeeded by: Donald Gettings

Personal details
- Born: December 15, 1923 Mississippi, US
- Died: April 22, 1977 (aged 53) Rochester, Minnesota, US
- Party: Democratic

Mattie Harper (December 15, 1923 – April 22, 1977) was an American politician who served in the Iowa House of Representatives from the 90th district from 1973 to 1977.

She died on April 22, 1977, aged 53, of cancer, in Rochester, Minnesota.
