= Milo Merrit =

American politician

Member of the Iowa Senate from the 7th district
- In office January 13, 1975 – January 7, 1979
- Preceded by: Ralph McCartney
- Succeeded by: Arthur Gratias

Personal details
- Born: January 3, 1915 Allerton, Iowa
- Died: January 8, 2009 (aged 94) Osage, Iowa
- Party: Democratic

Milo Merrit (January 3, 1915 – January 8, 2009) was an American politician who served in the Iowa Senate from the 7th district from 1975 to 1979.

He died on January 8, 2009, in Osage, Iowa at age 94.
