= Izaah Knox =

American politician (born 1977)

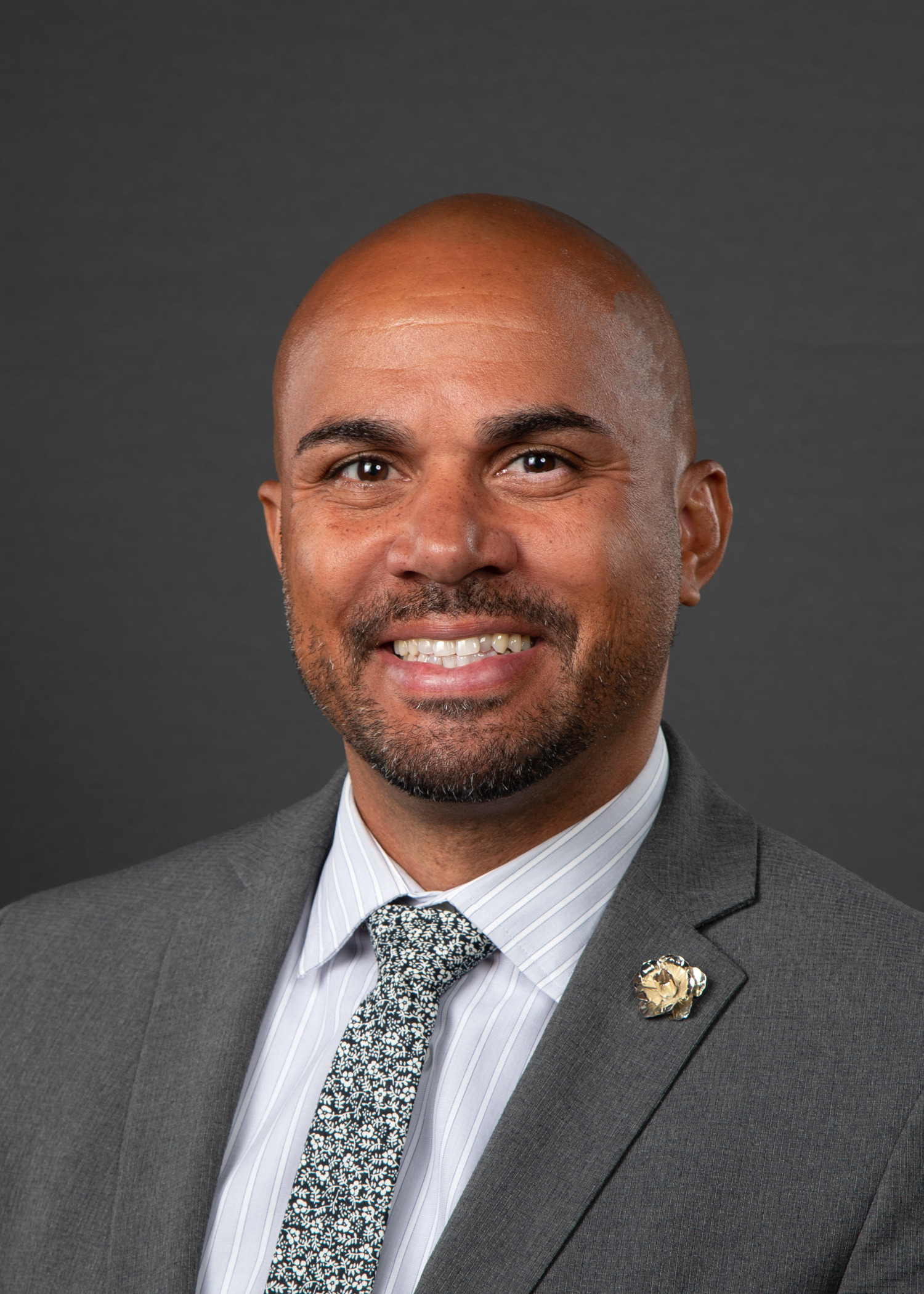

Member of the Iowa Senate from the 17th district
- Incumbent
- Assumed office January 9, 2023
- Preceded by: Tony Bisignano (redistricting)

Personal details
- Born: January 9, 1977 (age 49) Iowa City, Iowa, U.S.
- Party: Democratic
- Education: Ellsworth Community College; Kirkwood Community College; Drake University; Iowa State University

Izaah JB Knox (born January 9, 1977) is an American politician currently elected as the senator for the 17th District of the Iowa Senate.

== Early life, education, and career ==
Knox was born in Iowa City, Iowa. He grew up between Cedar Rapids, Iowa and Seattle, WA. He graduated from Cedar Rapids Washington High School, then Drake University, where he completed a bachelor's degree in public relations and marketing. After working as a life coach and with the Urban Dreams nonprofit organization in Des Moines, Knox returned to Drake, earning a master's degree in organizational leadership and policy studies. He then worked for Des Moines Area Community College, and subsequently pursued doctoral study at Iowa State University, eventually returning to Urban Dreams as executive director. Knox took over the organization from founder Wayne Ford.

== Political career ==
Knox began his campaign for the Iowa Senate in January 2022. Knox defeated Grace Van Cleave in a June 2022 Democratic Party primary, then won the general election for District 17 against Libertarian Party candidate ToyA Johnson and political independent Alejandro Murguia-Ortiz. Knox is of African-American descent. During the 2022 legislative election cycle, Knox was endorsed by Thomas Mann Jr., Iowa's first Black state senator who left office in 1989, Knox is the second Black senator. In November 2026, Knox was uncontested for district five of the Polk County Board of Supervisors.

== Personal life ==
Knox is married and has three children.

Iowa Senate
Preceded by Tony Bisignano	17th District; 2023 – present	Succeeded by Incumbent
