= Clel Baudler =

American politician (born 1939)

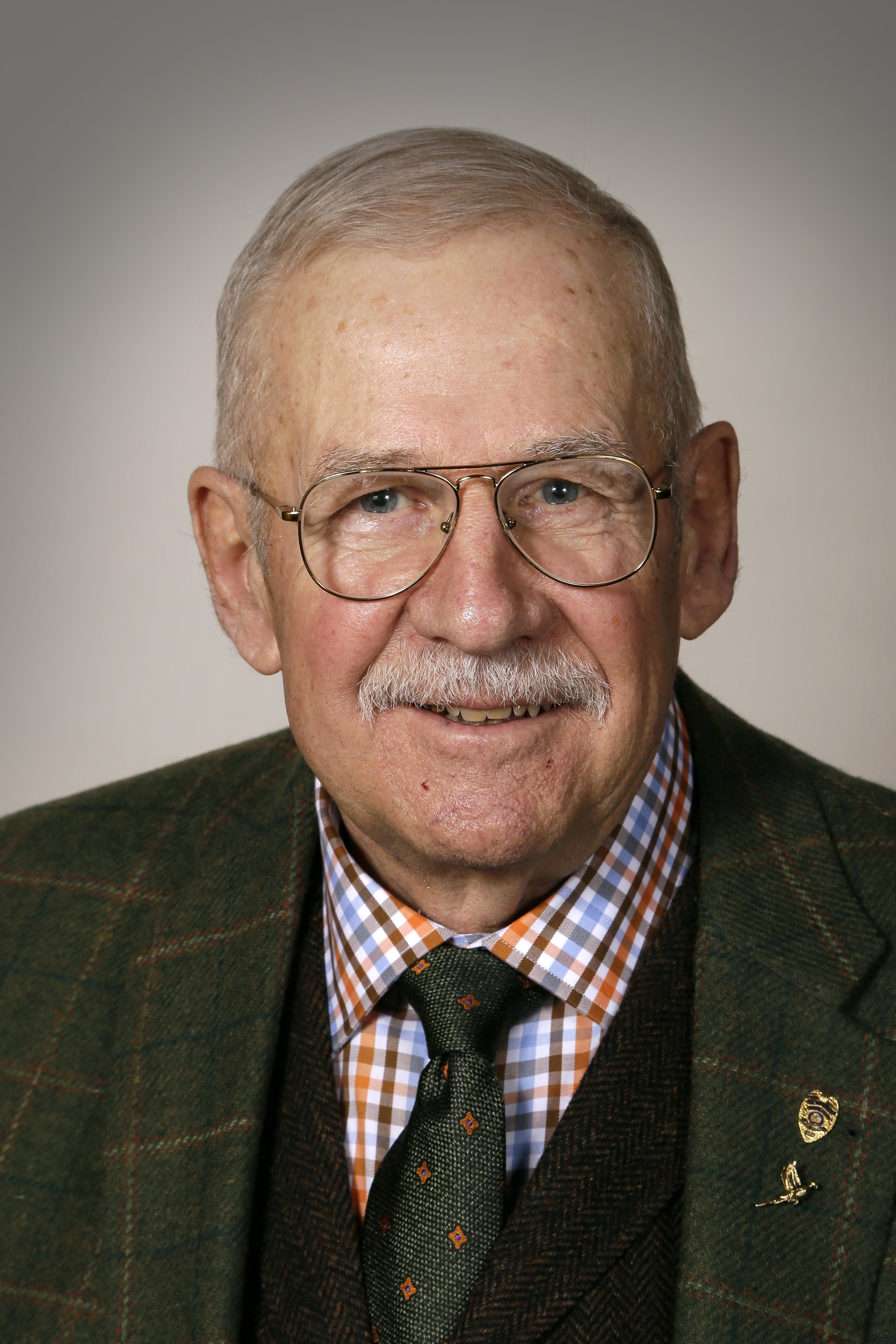

Member of the Iowa House of Representatives
- In office January 11, 1999 – January 14, 2019
- Preceded by: Dwight Dinkla
- Succeeded by: Ray Sorensen
- Constituency: 20th (2013–2019); 58th (2003–2013); 78th (1999–2003)

Personal details
- Born: April 4, 1939 (age 87) Fontanelle, Iowa, U.S.
- Party: Republican
- Spouse: Mary Carole
- Children: 4
- Website: legis.iowa.gov/...

Clel E. Baudler (born April 4, 1939) is an American politician who served as a member of the Iowa House of Representatives from the 20th district. A Republican, he was first elected to the House in 1998 and assumed office in 1999.

== Career ==
Baudler was born and raised in Fontanelle, Iowa, and resides in Greenfield. He served as a state trooper with the Iowa State Patrol for 32 years.

In the House, Baudler served on several committees, including the Agriculture, Environmental Protection, Government Oversight, and Natural Resources committees. He also serves as the chair of the Public Safety committee. He is on the board of directors of the National Rifle Association of America. Baudler did not seek re-election in 2018 and was succeeded by Ray Sorensen.

Iowa House of Representatives
Preceded by Dwight Dinkla	78th District; 1999–2003	Succeeded by Vicki Lensing
Preceded by Danny Carroll	58th District; 2003–2013	Succeeded by Brian Moore
Preceded by Walt Rogers	20th District; 2013–present	Succeeded by Incumbent
