= Dwight Dinkla =

American politician (born 1951)

Member of the Iowa House of Representatives from the 78th district
- In office January 11, 1993 – January 10, 1999
- Preceded by: Dennis Renaud
- Succeeded by: Clel Baudler

Personal details
- Born: Dwight L. Dinkla; December 30, 1951 (age 74) Adair County, Iowa, U.S.
- Party: Republican
- Spouse: Brenda E. Reha (m. 1973)
- Children: 4
- Relatives: Jo Ann Johnson (sister)
- Education: Morningside College; Drake University (JD) (JD)
- Occupation: Politician

Military service
- Allegiance: United States
- Branch/service: United States Marine Corps
- Years of service: 1977–1980

Dwight L. Dinkla (born December 30, 1951) is an American politician.

Dinkla was raised in Adair County, Iowa, alongside an elder sister Jo Ann Dinkla, by parents Elmer and Arlene Dinkla. He graduated from Adair-Casey Community High School in 1970, completed his bachelor's degree at Morningside College in 1970 and received a Juris Doctor degree from Drake University in 1973.

After serving in the United States Marine Corps from 1977 to 1980, Dwight Dinkla transferred to the Iowa Army National Guard in 1982. Dinkla was a Republican member of the Iowa House of Representatives from January 11, 1993, to January 10, 1999, for District 78.
