= Charles E. Knoblauch =

American politician and businessman

Charles E. Knoblauch (March 9, 1922 – February 7, 1984) was an American politician and businessman.

Born in La Crosse, Wisconsin, Knoblauch graduated from Aquinas High School, in La Crosse, Wisconsin, and went to Michigan State University. He served in the United States Army Air Forces during World War II. He worked for the Carroll, Iowa Chamber of Commerce, before sitting in the Iowa House of Representatives as a Democrat from 1969 to 1973. In 1978, he and his wife moved to Fort Dodge, Iowa. He died of a stroke in a hospital there in 1984.
