= Iowa's 27th Senate district =

American legislative district

Senate District 27
- Type: District of the Upper House
- Location: Northern Iowa
- Senator: Amanda Ragan (D)
- Parent organization: Iowa General Assembly

The 27th District of the Iowa Senate is located in central east Iowa, and is currently composed of Hardin, Grundy, and Poweshiek counties, as well as part of Tama and Black Hawk counties.

== Current elected officials ==
Amanda Ragan is the senator currently representing the 27th District.

The area of the 27th District contains two Iowa House of Representatives districts:

- The 53rd District (represented by Sharon Steckman)
- The 54th District (represented by Shannon Latham)

The district is also located in Iowa's 4th congressional district, which is represented by Randy Feenstra.

== Past senators ==
The district has previously been represented by:

- C. Joseph Coleman, 1957–1963
- Joe Brown, 1983–1986
- Richard Varn, 1987–1992
- Wally Horn, 1993–2002
- Ron Wieck, 2003–2010
- Bill Anderson, 2011–2012
- Amanda Ragan, 2013–present

== See also ==
- Iowa General Assembly
- Iowa Senate
