= James Riordan (Iowa politician) =

American politician in Iowa (1949–2022)

Member of the Iowa Senate from the 39th district
- In office January 11, 1993 – January 8, 1995
- Preceded by: William D. Palmer
- Succeeded by: Jo Ann Douglas

Member of the Iowa Senate from the 45th district
- In office September 10, 1985 – January 10, 1993
- Preceded by: Norman Rodgers
- Succeeded by: Bill Fink

Personal details
- Born: James Richard Riordan II; December 31, 1949 Near Boone, Iowa, U.S.
- Died: August 14, 2022 (aged 72) Johnston, Iowa, U.S.
- Party: Democratic

James Richard Riordan II (December 31, 1949 – August 14, 2022) was an American politician.

== Personal life ==
Born in December 1949, James Richard Riordan II was the eldest of five children born to parents James Richard Riordan I and his wife Therese. The family lived on a farm near Boone, Iowa, and Riordan II graduated from the city's Ryan High School in 1968. Shortly after earning his bachelor's degree from Iowa State University in 1975, Riordan married Rhoda Quade, with whom he raised three children. The couple separated in 2015. Riordan owned the Ashworth Acres tree nursery near Waukee, and later worked as a researcher and writer of grants and contracts for Des Moines Area Community College.

Riordan died on August 14, 2022 in Johnston, Iowa, of aspiration pneumonia and COVID-19 during the COVID-19 pandemic in Iowa.

== Political career ==
Politically, Riordan was affiliated with the Democratic Party. He worked as an administrative assistant for Robert T. Anderson, an aide to Tom Harkin, and was staff director of the United States Senate Democratic Caucus before winning a seat on the Iowa Senate in 1985. Riordan held the District 45 seat from September 10, 1985, to January 10, 1993, and subsequently represented District 39 until January 8, 1995.
