= Al Sturgeon =

American politician

Member of the Iowa Senate from the 1st district
- In office 12 January 1987 – 8 January 1995
- Preceded by: Milo Colton
- Succeeded by: Steven D. Hansen

Member of the Iowa House of Representatives from the 2nd district
- In office 10 January 1983 – 11 January 1987
- Preceded by: Douglas Ritsema
- Succeeded by: Michael R. Peters

Member of the Iowa House of Representatives from the 51st district
- In office 12 January 1981 – 9 January 1983
- Preceded by: Donald V. Doyle
- Succeeded by: Richard Running

Personal details
- Born: 14 February 1956 (age 70) Sioux City, Iowa, U.S.
- Party: Democratic
- Education: Morningside College (BA); University of Iowa College of Law (JD)

Al Sturgeon (born 14 February 1956) is an American lawyer and former politician.

== Early life and political career ==
Al Sturgeon is a native of Sioux City, Iowa, born on 14 February 1956. He graduated from East High School and Morningside College in his hometown. Sturgeon was then employed as a consultant to the Northwest Regional Library, and also worked in production for the Continental Baking Company for six and a half years before winning his first statewide legislative election in 1980, representing District 51 of the Iowa House of Representatives as a Democrat. Sturgeon subsequently won reelection to House District 2 in 1982 and 1984. During his third consecutive term as state representative, Sturgeon began attending the University of Iowa College of Law. Sturgeon was elected to the first of two terms on the Iowa Senate in 1986 and completed his Juris Doctor degree in 1989. After defeating Milo Colton in a 1990 party primary, Sturgeon held the Senate District 1 seat until 1995.

After leaving the Iowa General Assembly, Sturgeon later served as chairman of the Woodbury County Democratic Party. He stepped down from the position in 2005, and was succeeded by Tim Bottaro.

== Personal life ==
In April 1986, Sturgeon attended a party with legislative colleagues, and was charged by a grand jury that August with indecent exposure. The charge was filed as a misdemeanor, and Sturgeon pled innocent during a September court hearing. He eventually pled guilty to the lesser charge of disorderly conduct in February 1987. Sturgeon's first application to sit for the Iowa bar exam was rejected due to this controversy. During the legal proceedings for this case, Sturgeon admitted to birthing a child out of wedlock in 1984, and agreed to pay child support.

Al Sturgeon's father Harold Allen Sturgeon Sr. died on 31 July 2010. His mother Opal Grace Sturgeon died on 3 April 2020.
