= Ron Wieck =

American politician

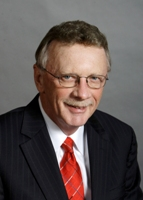

Member of the Iowa Senate from the 27th district
- In office January 13, 2003 – January 10, 2011
- Preceded by: Wally Horn
- Succeeded by: Bill Anderson

Personal details
- Born: August 13, 1944 (age 81) Hinton, Iowa
- Party: Republican
- Spouse: Carol
- Occupation: Insurance Agent

Ron Wieck (born August 13, 1944) is a former Iowa state senator from the 27th District. A Republican, he served in the Iowa Senate from 2003 to 2010, representing Cherokee County. He served as Senate minority leader from September 2007 until November 2008.

Wieck served on several committees in the Iowa Senate, including the Economic Growth committee, the Government Oversight committee, the Labor and Business Relations committee, the State Government committee, the Veterans Affairs committee, and the Commerce committee, where he was the ranking member.
