= Wally Horn =

American politician (1933–2026)

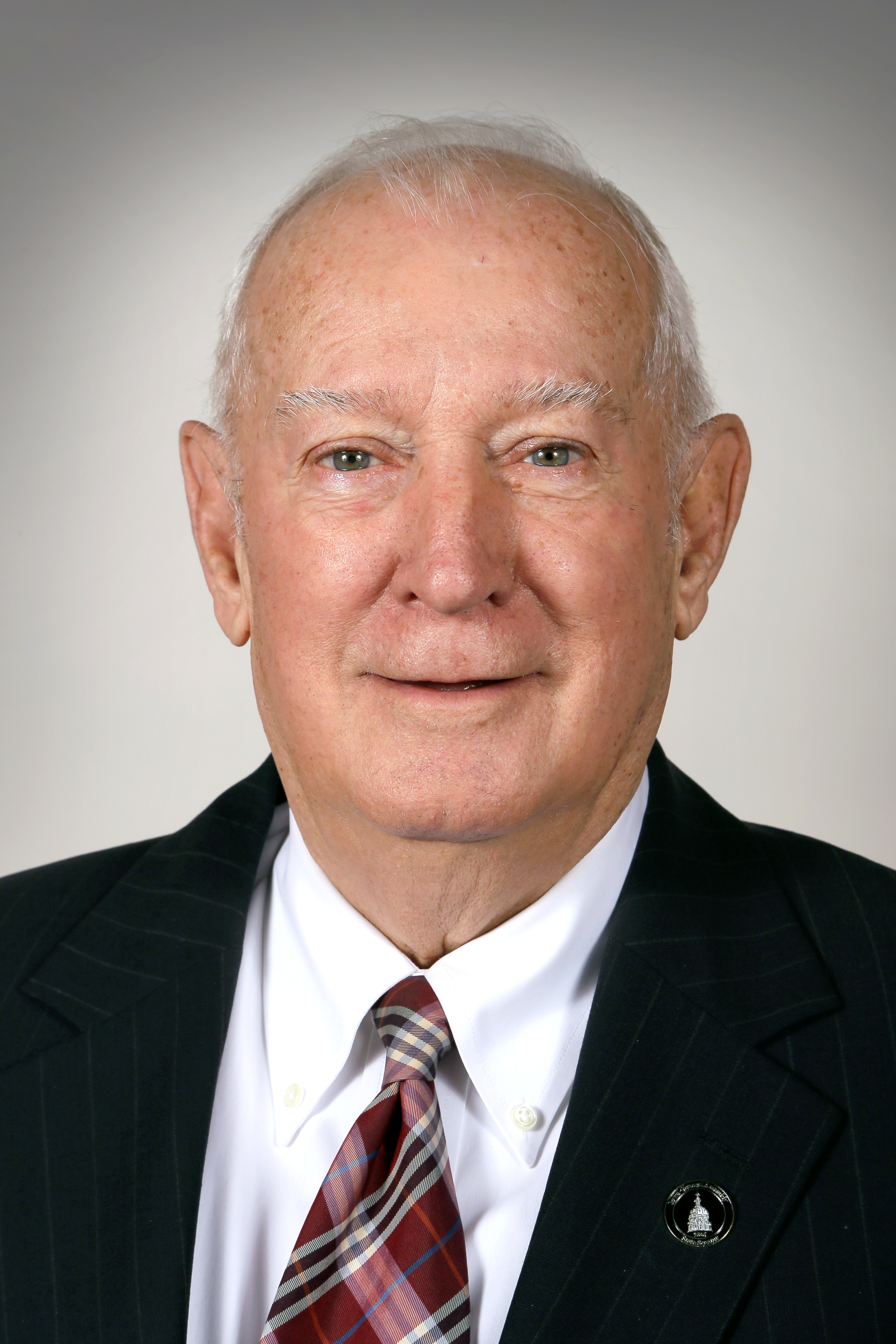

Member of the Iowa Senate
- In office January 10, 1983 – January 13, 2019
- Preceded by: Clarence Carney
- Succeeded by: Todd Taylor
- Constituency: 25th district (1983–1993); 27th district (1993–2003); 17th district (2003–2015); 35th district (2015–2019)

Member of the Iowa House of Representatives from the 28th district
- In office January 8, 1973 – January 10, 1983
- Preceded by: Charles E. Knoblauch
- Succeeded by: Donald Avenson

Personal details
- Born: November 28, 1933 Bloomfield, Iowa, U.S.
- Died: November 19, 2026 (aged 92) Cedar Rapids, Iowa, U.S.
- Party: Democratic
- Spouse(s): Beverly Morse (m. 1956) Phyllis Peterson
- Children: 2
- Education: Northeastern Missouri State Teachers College; Texas A&M University; University of Iowa
- Occupation: Legislator
- Website: Horn's website

Wally Eugene Horn (November 28, 1933 – November 19, 2026) was an American politician who served in the Iowa legislature from 1973 to 2019.

Horn served on several committees in the Iowa Senate – the Judiciary committee; the Labor and Business Relations committee; the Rebuild Iowa committee; and the State Government committee. He also served on the Education Appropriations Subcommittee. He was the longest serving state legislator in Iowa.

== Early life and education ==
Horn born to Lyle and LaRetta Horn and was raised in Bloomfield, Iowa. He graduated from Bloomfield High School in 1952. He then attended Northeastern Missouri State Teachers College where received his BS in 1958 and MA in 1962. He then did graduate work done at Texas A&M University and the University of Iowa.

== Career ==
Horn worked for more than 30 years as a high school teacher, coach, and information facilitator for schools in Cedar Rapids, Iowa. During the Korean War, from 1953 to 1955, he served in the US Army and was stationed in Germany.

== Organizations ==
=== Memberships ===
- Council State Government
- Midwest Legislature's Executive Board
- Executive committee for the Democratic Legislative Campaign Committee
- Community Correction Board
- Elks and Moose Lodges Board
- American Legion
- Veterans of Foreign Wars
- NCSL Executive Board (15 years)

== Family ==
He married Beverly Morse in 1956. They had two children together, who gave them 7 grandchildren. He attended a Methodist Church. He later married Phyllis Peterson in 1993. They had two children and seven grandchildren.

He died on November 19, 2026 at Meth-Wick Retirement Community in Cedar Rapids at the age of 92.

Iowa House of Representatives
Preceded by Charles Knoblauch	28th District; 1973–1983	Succeeded by Donald Avenson
Iowa Senate
Preceded by Clarence Carney	25th District; 1983–1993	Succeeded by Richard Varn
Preceded by Richard Varn	27th District; 1993–2003	Succeeded by Ron Wieck
Preceded by Tom Flynn	17th District; 2003–2019	Succeeded by Tony Bisignano
