= Iowa's 45th Senate district =

American legislative district

Senate District 45
- Type: District of the Upper House
- Location: Eastern Iowa
- Senator: Janice Weiner (D)
- Parent organization: Iowa General Assembly

The 45th District of the Iowa Senate is located in eastern Iowa, and is currently composed of part of Johnson County.

== Current elected officials ==
Janice Weiner is the senator currently representing the 45th District.

The area of the 45th District contains two Iowa House of Representatives districts:

- The 89th District (represented by Elinor A. Levin)
- The 90th District (represented by Adam Zabner)

The district is also located in Iowa's 1st congressional district, which is represented by Mariannette Miller-Meeks.

== Past senators ==
The district has previously been represented by:

- Addison Oliver, 1866–1868
- Theodore Hawley, 1868–1870
- Isaac J. Mitchell, 1870–1872
- George M. Maxwell, 1872–1876
- William Harrison Gallup, 1876–1878
- Robert M. Haines, 1878–1882
- Alfred Nelson Poyneer, 1882–1890
- Jacob J. Mosnat, 1890–1894
- Emlen G. Penrose, 1894–1902
- William Perry Whipple, 1902–1910
- Asa L. Ames, 1911–1915
- Henry Cook White, 1915–1927, 1931–1933
- Samuel Albert Brush, 1927–1931
- Richard V. Leo, 1933–1935, 1939–1951
- Henry Julius Grunewald, 1935–1939
- Henry E. Weichman, 1951–1955
- Lawrence Putney, 1955–1963
- Leo Elthon, 1963–1967
- John P. Kibbie, 1967–1969
- Walter B. Hammer, 1969
- S. J. Brownlee, 1969–1971
- Richard Lytle Stephens, 1971–1973
- Gene W. Glenn, 1973–1979
- Sue Yenger, 1979–1983
- Norman George Rodgers, 1983–1985
- James R. Riordan, 1985–1992
- William Fink, 1993–2003
- David P. Miller, 2003–2007
- Becky Schmitz, 2007–2011
- Sandy Greiner, 2011–2013
- Joe M. Seng, 2013–2016
- Jim Lykam, 2017–2023
- Janice Weiner, 2023–Present

== Recent election results from statewide races ==
Year	Office	Results
2008	President	Obama 75–23%
2012	President	Obama 74–26%
2016	President	Clinton 72–20%
2016	Senate	Judge 65–30%
2018	Governor	Hubbell 80–19%
2018	Attorney General	Miller 88–12%
2018	Secretary of State	DeJear 76–21%
2018	Treasurer	Fitzgerald 80–17%
2018	Auditor	Sand 78–19%
2020	President	Biden 79–19%
2020	Senate	Greenfield 78–20%
2022	Senate	Franken 82–18%
2022	Governor	DeJear 80–18%
2022	Attorney General	Miller 83–17%
2022	Secretary of State	Miller 79–21%
2022	Treasurer	Fitzgerald 82–18%
2022	Auditor	Sand 83–17%
2024	President	Harris 75–23%
