= Iowa's 54th House of Representatives district =

American legislative district

House District 54
- Type: District of the Lower house
- Location: Iowa
- Representative: Joshua Meggers
- Parent organization: Iowa General Assembly

The 54th District of the Iowa House of Representatives in the state of Iowa. It is currently composed of Hardin and Grundy Counties, as well as part of Black Hawk County.

== Current elected officials ==
Joshua Meggers is the representative currently representing the district.

== Past representatives ==
The district has previously been represented by:

- Cyrenus C. Bauder, 1858–1860
- William W. Belknap, 1858–1860
- John Allen Casey, 1858–1860
- George William Ruddick, 1860–1862
- Laverne Schroeder, 1971–1973
- Arlyn E. Danker, 1973–1983
- Richard J. Varn, 1983–1987
- Robert Dvorsky, 1987–1993
- Richard Running, 1993–1995
- Todd Taylor, 1995–2003
- Christopher Rants, 2003–2011
- Ron Jorgensen, 2011–2013
- Linda Upmeyer, 2013–2021
- Shannon Latham, 2021–2023
- Joshua Meggers, 2023–present
