= Norman Goodwin =

American politician (1913–2010)

Member of the Iowa Senate from the 19th district
- In office January 10, 1983 – January 13, 1991
- Preceded by: John W. Jensen
- Succeeded by: Sheldon L. Rittmer

Member of the Iowa Senate from the 39th district
- In office January 8, 1979 – January 9, 1983
- Preceded by: Roger John Shaff
- Succeeded by: William D. Palmer

Personal details
- Born: January 5, 1913 Austin, Minnesota
- Died: April 2, 2010 (aged 97) Stillwater, Minnesota
- Party: Republican

Norman J. Goodwin (January 5, 1913 – April 2, 2010) was an American politician.

A native of Austin, Minnesota, Norman Goodwin was born to parents Nels and Nellie Goodwin on January 5, 1913. He attended LaBarr Grade School before graduating from Austin High School. Goodwin earned a bachelor's and master's degree from the University of Minnesota in 1936 and 1945, respectively.

Goodwin moved to Clinton County, Iowa, where he farmed and served as county extension director from 1951 to 1978. He was elected to his first term on the Iowa Senate later that year, and represented District 39 for four years as a Republican. Goodwin subsequently won two terms for District 19.

In later life, Goodwin moved to Bayport, Minnesota, and died at Lakeview Hospital in Stillwater on April 2, 2010, aged 97.
