= Adam Zabner =

American politician (born 1999)

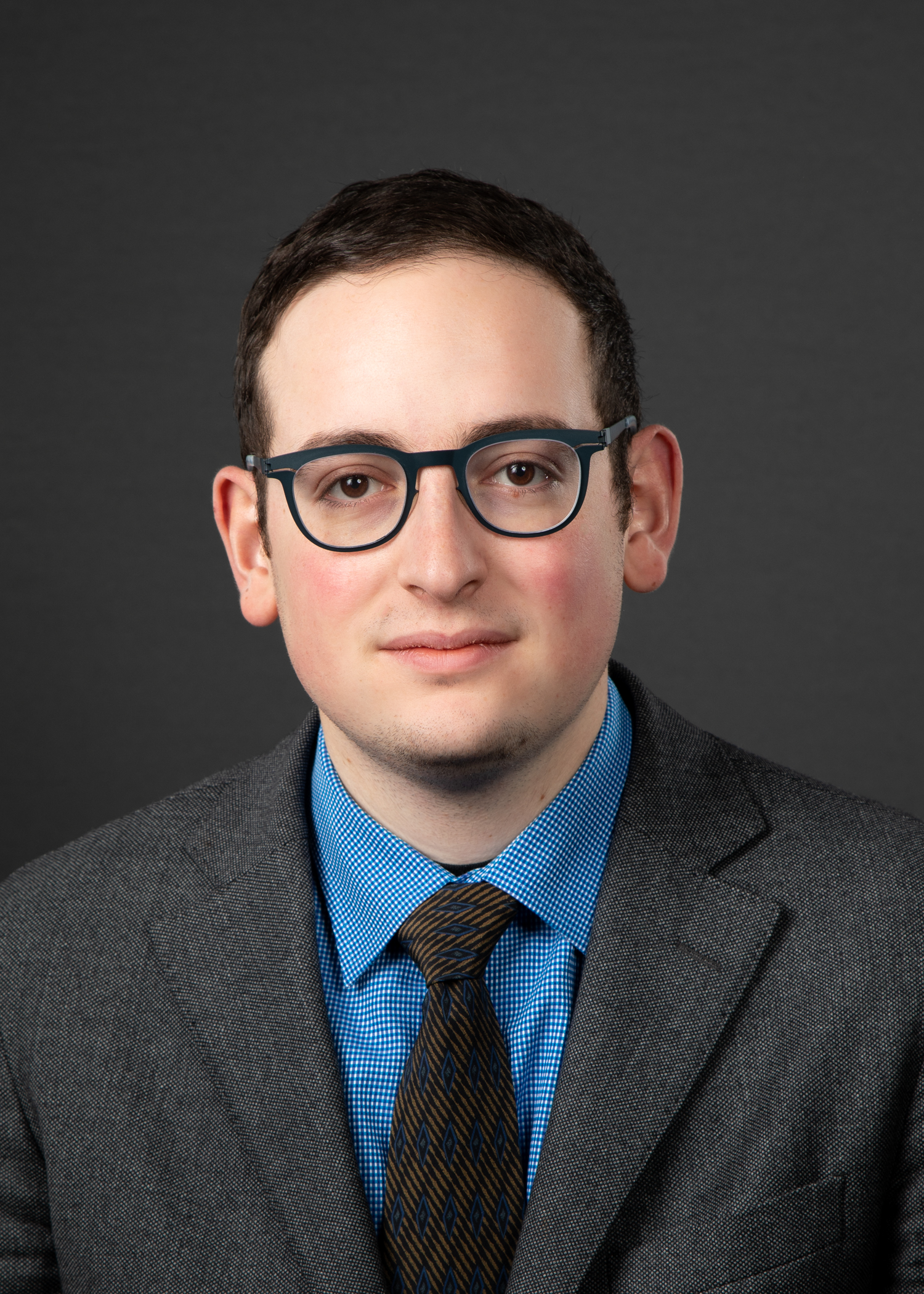

Member of the Iowa House of Representatives for the 90th District
- Incumbent
- Assumed office January 1, 2023
- Preceded by: Christina Bohannan

Personal details
- Born: Adam Zabner; May 23, 1999 (age 27) Iowa City, Iowa, U.S.
- Party: Democratic
- Education: City High School, Iowa City
- Alma mater: University of Chicago (BS)
- Occupation: Political organizer, politician
- Website: Official website

Adam Zabner (born May 24, 1999) is an American politician who serves as a member of the Iowa House of Representatives representing the 90th district, since January 1, 2023.

== Personal life and education ==
Zabner was born May 24, 1999, in Iowa City, Iowa. His parents are Jewish immigrants from Venezuela. His mother is originally from Israel. His father was a student at the University of Iowa and initially only planned to stay for three years in the US. Due to his personal background and challenges with US Immigration of his parents, he campaigns for immigration topics as well.

He graduated from City High School in 2017. In 2021, he graduated from the University of Chicago with a Bachelor of Science in Neuroscience.

While visiting China, Adam Zabner's elder brother David was injured in the 2024 Jilin knife attack.

== Career ==
He gained first work experience while being a research assistant at the University of Iowa and the Marine Biological Laboratory in Woods Hole, Massachusetts. In 2019, he became an organizing intern, and between 2019 and 2020 an organizer for the campaign of Pete Buttigieg. He then served in the capacity of regional organizing director for the Iowa Democratic Party. He was also an out-of-state volunteer coordinator for Jon Ossoff in his campaign for U.S. Senate.

== State House ==
Zabner won the primary and the general election for Iowa House of Representatives on November 8, 2022. He assumed office on January 1, 2023, and was re-elected for a second term on November 5, 2024.

=== 2025-2027 Committee assignments ===
- Local Government (ranking member)
- Appropriations
- Commerce
- Natural Resources
- State Government
- Agriculture and Natural Resources Appropriations Subcommittee
- Public Retirement Systems Committee
