= Jack Hester (footballer) =

Australian rules footballer

Personal information
- Full name: John Warwick Hester
- Born: 1 July 1922; Hawthorn, Victoria
- Died: 24 March 1999 (aged 76)
- Height: 169 cm (5 ft 7 in)
- Weight: 62 kg (137 lb)

Playing career^{1}
Years	Club	Games (Goals)
1947–48	Hawthorn	15 (15)
- ^{1} Playing statistics correct to the end of 1948.

John Warwick Hester (1 July 1922 – 24 March 1999) was an Australian rules footballer who played with Hawthorn in the Victorian Football League (VFL).

Prior to playing with Hawthorn, Hester served as a member of the 24th Battalion (Australia) in World War II.
