= Kevin Kinney (politician) =

American politician

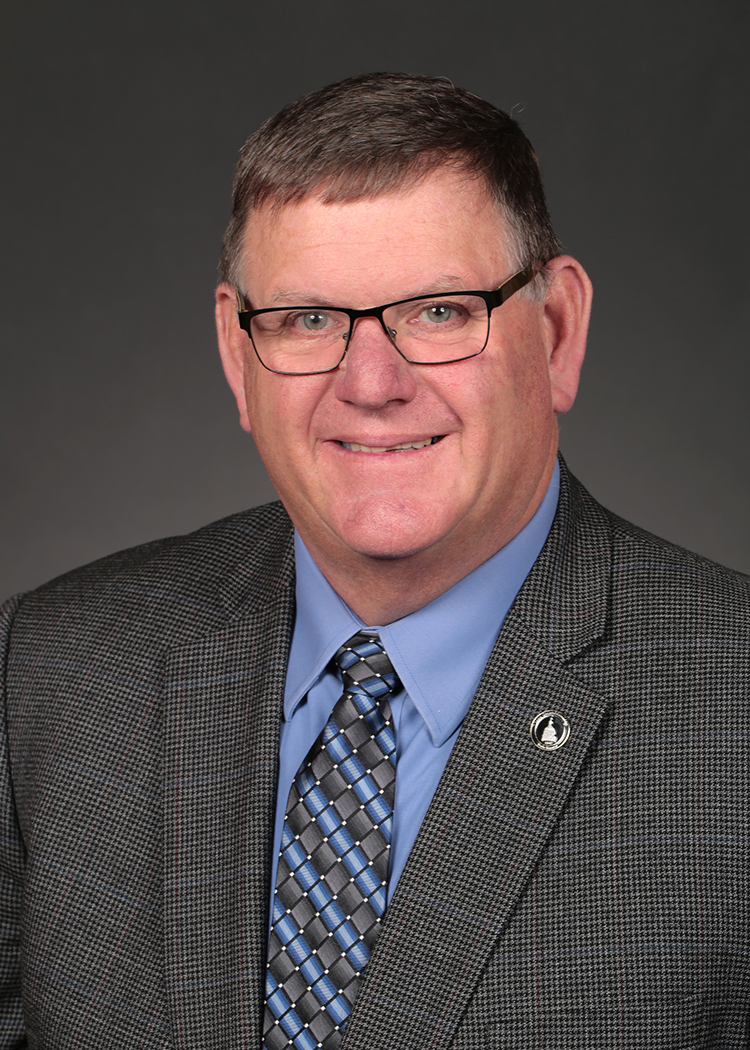

Member of the Iowa Senate from the 39th district
- In office January 12, 2015 – January 3, 2023
- Preceded by: Joe Bolkcom
- Succeeded by: Dawn Driscoll

Personal details
- Born: 1963 (age 62–63) Oxford, Iowa, U.S.
- Party: Democratic
- Spouse: Debbie
- Children: Shaun, Megan
- Occupation: Farmer

Kevin Kinney (born 1963) is a former Iowa State Senator from the 39th District. A Democrat, he served in the Iowa Senate from 2015 to 2023. Kinney is a farmer and a former lieutenant with the Johnson County Sheriff's Office. He was born and raised in Oxford, Iowa, attending Clear Creek High School. He currently lives just outside of Oxford with his wife Debbie and two children.

As of February 2020, Kinney serves on the following committees: Agriculture (Ranking Member), Judiciary (Ranking Member), Ethics, and Transportation. He also serves on the Agriculture and Natural Resources Appropriations Subcommittee, as well as the International Relations Committee, Connecting Rural Iowa Task Force, Iowa Law Enforcement Academy Council, and the Justice Advisory Board.

== Electoral history ==
2014 Iowa Senate 39th District election
Party	Candidate	Votes	%
Democratic	Kevin Kinney	12,371	52.2%
Republican	Michael D. Moore	11,306	47.8%
Democratic hold			

2018 Iowa Senate 39th District election
Party	Candidate	Votes	%
Democratic	Kevin Kinney	15,758	54.5%
Republican	Heather Hora	13,130	45.4%
Democratic hold			
