= Wilmer Rensink =

American politician (born 1933)

Member of the Iowa State Senate
- In office 1987–1999

Member of the Iowa House of Representatives
- In office 1983–1987

Personal details
- Born: March 22, 1933 (age 93) Sioux Center, Iowa, U.S.
- Party: Republican
- Occupation: farmer

Wilmer Rensink (born March 22, 1933) is an American politician in the state of Iowa.

Rensink was born in Sioux Center, Iowa. He is a farmer and livestock feeder. He served in the Iowa State Senate from 1987 to 1999, and House of Representatives from 1983 to 1987 as a Republican.
