= James Kersten =

American politician

James B. Kersten (born 14 October 1960) is an American politician.

He was born in Fort Dodge, Iowa, on 14 October 1960, to parents Herbert and CeCe Kersten. James Kersten graduated from Fort Dodge High School in his hometown, and subsequently enrolled at the University of Iowa. He completed a bachelor's degree in public administration at Drake University, then took a basic economic development course at the University of North Carolina. Kersten was employed by the American State Bank as a financial adviser, president of Professional Financial Advisers, Inc., and associated with the Iowa Department of Economic Development.

Politically, Kersten was a member of the Republican Party. Prior to serving the District 7 of the Iowa Senate from 1991 to 1995, he was an assistant to Terry Branstad.
