= Thomas Mann (Iowa politician) =

American politician

Member of the Iowa Senate from the 43rd district
- In office January 10, 1983 – January 13, 1991
- Preceded by: Lowell Junkins
- Succeeded by: Florence Buhr

Personal details
- Born: December 15, 1949 (age 76) Haywood County, Tennessee, U.S.
- Party: Democratic
- Education: Tennessee State University (BS); University of Iowa (JD)
- Occupation: Politician; lawyer

Thomas Mann Jr. (born December 15, 1949) is an American politician and the first Black member elected to the Iowa Senate. He served as a Democratic senator for the 43rd district between 1983 and 1991.

== Early life ==
In 1949, Thomas Mann Jr. was born in Haywood County, Tennessee to parents Thomas and Flossie Mann. In 1967, he graduated from West High School in Jackson before attending Tennessee State University, where he received a BS in political science in 1971. Three years later, he completed his JD from the University of Iowa.

== Career ==
After graduating from law school, Mann held several roles, including as a state assistant attorney general, a member of the Board of Directors for the Des Moines branch of the NAACP, and the first executive director of the Iowa Civil Rights Commission. In 1982, Mann was elected to the 43rd district of the Iowa Senate, becoming the first elected Black senator. During his tenure, he advocated for civil liberties and social justice initiatives.

In 1990, Mann declined to run for re-election to a third term. He was succeeded by fellow Democrat Florence Buhr. However, he would remain Iowa's only elected Black senator for over three more decades, until the 2022 election of Izaah Knox.

In 2021, Mann published his autobiography, The Call to Serve.
