= Linn Fuhrman =

American politician (1944–1994)

Member of the Iowa Senate from the 5th district
- In office January 12, 1987 – January 23, 1994
- Preceded by: Arne Waldstein
- Succeeded by: Mary Lou Freeman

Personal details
- Born: November 14, 1944 Cherokee, Iowa, U.S.
- Died: January 23, 1994 (aged 49) Aurelia, Iowa, U.S.
- Party: Republican

Linn Fuhrman (November 14, 1944 – January 23, 1994) was an American politician who served in the Iowa Senate from the 5th district from 1987 to 1994.

He died on January 23, 1994, in Aurelia, Iowa, at age 49.

Iowa Senate
Preceded by Arne Waldstein	Member of the Iowa Senate from the 5th district 1987–1994	Succeeded by Mary Lou Freeman
