= C. Joseph Coleman =

American politician (1923–2002)

Member of the Iowa Senate from the 7th district
- In office January 10, 1983 – January 13, 1991
- Preceded by: Arthur Gratias
- Succeeded by: James Kersten

Member of the Iowa Senate from the 23rd district
- In office January 8, 1973 – January 9, 1983
- Succeeded by: Arthur A. Small

Member of the Iowa Senate from the 15th district
- In office January 11, 1971 – January 7, 1973
- Preceded by: Harold Thordsen
- Succeeded by: Ralph Wilson Potter

Member of the Iowa Senate from the 35th district
- In office January 9, 1967 – January 10, 1971

Member of the Iowa Senate from the 36th district
- In office January 11, 1965 – January 8, 1967

Member of the Iowa Senate from the 17th district
- In office January 14, 1963 – January 10, 1965
- Preceded by: Harry L. Cowden
- Succeeded by: Jack Schroeder

Member of the Iowa Senate from the 27th district
- In office January 14, 1957 – January 13, 1963

Personal details
- Born: Charles Joseph Coleman; March 14, 1923 Fort Dodge, Iowa, U.S.
- Died: July 26, 2002 (aged 79)
- Party: Democratic
- Spouse(s): Katherine Ann Burken (m. 1945; died 1950) Polly Pflanz (m. 1954)
- Children: 3
- Education: Iowa State University; Bradley University
- Occupation: Politician, farmer, businessman

Charles Joseph Coleman Sr. (March 14, 1923 – July 26, 2002) was an American politician.

== Personal life ==
C. Joseph Coleman was born on March 14, 1923, to parents Daniel and Geneva Coleman in Fort Dodge, Iowa. The family resided in Clare, where Joseph was raised. After completing his primary and secondary education at St. Matthew's Academy in his hometown, Coleman enrolled at Iowa State University and subsequently transferred to complete his college education at Bradley University. Coleman was married twice, first to Katherine Ann Burken from October 1945 to her death in December 1950, and then to Polly Pflanz from January 1954. Joseph Coleman had three sons, C. Joseph Jr. Kerry, and Kevin Gerard. A grandson, C. Joseph III and known as Joey, is a motivational speaker. C. Joseph Coleman died at the age of 79, on July 26, 2002.

== Public service career ==
After graduating from college, Coleman worked for the Iowa Conservation Service. Politically, he was affiliated with the Democratic Party. Coleman won his first election to the Iowa Senate in 1956, and served continuously until 1991. His tenure as Iowa's longest-serving state legislator ended in an election loss to James Kersten.
