= Arthur Gratias =

American politician

Member of the Iowa Senate from the 15th district
- In office January 10, 1983 – January 11, 1987
- Succeeded by: Kenneth D. Scott

Member of the Iowa Senate from the 7th district
- In office January 8, 1979 – January 9, 1983
- Preceded by: Milo Merrit
- Succeeded by: C. Joseph Coleman

Personal details
- Born: May 1, 1920 Nora Springs, Iowa, United States
- Died: March 6, 2015 (aged 94) Mason City, Iowa
- Party: Republican
- Occupation: farmer, educator

Arthur L. Gratias (May 1, 1920 – March 6, 2015) was an American politician in the state of Iowa.

Gratias was born in Nora Springs, Iowa. He attended Wartburg College and the University of Northern Iowa. He served in the United States Army during World War II, for which he received the Légion d'honneur in 2013. Gratias farmed for 23 years. His career in education included five years of teaching experience and four years as an elementary school principal. Gratias then served 22 years on the school board. He was a member of the Iowa Senate from 1979 to 1987, serving the 7th and 15th districts as a Republican.
