= Joseph Welsh =

American politician (born 1955)

Joseph J. Welsh (born 10 August 1955) is an American politician.

Joseph Welsh was born in Dubuque, Iowa, on 10 August 1955 to parents Glenn and Margaret Welsh. He graduated from Dubuque Senior High School, and, during his first term as a state representative, was working toward his degree in political science from Loras College, and concurrently serving as deputy sheriff of Dubuque County. For six years, Welsh had been a volunteer firefighter in Key West, Iowa.

Welsh was elected to the first of two terms for the District 21 seat in the Iowa House of Representatives as a Democrat in 1978. He vacated the position in 1983, to begin his tenure as a member of the Iowa Senate in District 17. Welsh contested the 1984 United States House of Representatives election in Iowa, losing to incumbent Tom Tauke. Welsh retained his state senate seat, serving as chair of the Senate Appropriations Committee between 1985 and 1991, then as president of the senate through 1993. During his two-year term as senate president, Welsh became associated with Steven Wymer, an investment manager who was charged with securities fraud in December 1991. The next month, Welsh's senate colleagues organized a probe into his business relationships, particularly in his position as a representative of Institutional Treasury Management Inc. The affair became known as the Iowa Trust Fund scandal. Aside from Welsh's hometown of Dubuque, the municipal government of Webster City was also heavily affected. Charges against Welsh were primarily led by former legislator Lucas DeKoster, as a member of the Senate Ethics Committee, and Jack Rife. As a result of the ethics probe, Welsh was reprimanded. In light of the findings, Beverly Hannon challenged voters to write a legislative code of ethics. By 1993, a newly proposed ethics law was being discussed. Welsh retained his senate seat until 1995.

By the time his mother died in 2015, James Welsh had relocated to Cupertino, California.
