= Florence Buhr =

American politician (1933–2018)

Member of the Iowa State Senate
- In office January 14, 1991 – January 8, 1995

Member of the Iowa State House of Representatives
- In office January 10, 1983 – January 13, 1991

Personal details
- Born: April 7, 1933 Mills County, Iowa, U.S.
- Died: May 12, 2018 (aged 85) Johnston, Iowa, U.S.
- Party: Democratic
- Spouse: Glenn Buhr
- Occupation: teacher

Florence D. Buhr (née Wederquist; April 7, 1933 – May 12, 2018) was an American politician in the state of Iowa. Buhr was born in Mills County, Iowa. She attended University of Northern Iowa and is a former teacher. A Democrat, she served in the Iowa House of Representatives from 1983 to 1995 (85th district) Iowa Senate from 1995 to 2003 (43rd district 1991 to 1993 and 35th district from 1993 to 1995).

She died on May 12, 2018, in Johnston, Iowa at age 85.
