= Iowa's 33rd Senate district =

American legislative district

Senate District 33
- Type: District of the Upper House
- Location: Eastern Iowa
- Senator: Rob Hogg (D)
- Parent organization: Iowa General Assembly

The 33rd District of the Iowa Senate is located in eastern Iowa, and is currently composed of Jones County, as well as Dubuque and Jackson counties.

== Current elected officials ==
Rob Hogg is the senator currently representing the 33rd District.

The area of the 33rd District contains two Iowa House of Representatives districts:

- The 65th District (represented by Liz Bennett)
- The 66th District (represented by Art Staed)

The district is also located in Iowa's 1st congressional district, which is represented by Ashley Hinson.

== Past senators ==
The district has previously been represented by:

- John W. Patton, 1965–1966
- James Potgeter, 1967–1970
- John Tapscott, 1971–1972
- George F. Milligan, 1973–1974
- Philip B. Hill, 1975–1978
- Julia Gentleman, 1979–1982
- Donald Gettings, 1983–1992
- William D. Palmer, 1993–1998
- Jeff Lamberti, 1999–2002
- Jack Hatch, 2003–2012
- Rob Hogg, 2013–present

== See also ==
- Iowa General Assembly
- Iowa Senate
