= Douglas Ritsema =

American lawyer and politician

Douglas J. Ritsema (born December 28, 1952) is an American lawyer and politician.

== Early life and education ==
Douglas Ritsema was born in Holland, Michigan, on December 28, 1952, to parents Herbert and Jeanne Ritsema. The family moved to Orange City, Iowa, where Ritsema graduated from Maurice–Orange City High School in 1971. He completed studies in mathematics at Northwestern College in 1975 and subsequently earned a J. D. from the University of Iowa College of Law in 1978.

== Political career ==
During law school, Ritsema was an intern at the Iowa House of Representatives in 1977. He won election to the legislative body itself in November 1978, and retained his 2nd district seat during the 1980 elections. Ritsema subsequently won a four-year term on the Iowa Senate in 1982, representing the 3rd district. During his political career, Ritsema was affiliated with the Republican Party.
