= Bill Dieleman =

American politician (born 1931)

Member of the Iowa State Senate
- In office 1983–1995

Member of the Iowa House of Representatives
- In office 1975–1983

Personal details
- Born: January 19, 1931 (age 95) Oskaloosa, Iowa, U.S.
- Party: Democratic
- Occupation: life insurance underwriter, newspaper publisher

William W. Dieleman (born January 19, 1931) was an American politician in the state of Iowa.

Dieleman was born in Oskaloosa, Iowa. He attended Calvin College and the University of Iowa and was a life insurance underwriter and newspaper publisher. He served in the Iowa State Senate from 1983 to 1995, and House of Representatives from 1975 to 1983 as a Democrat.
