= Iowa's 17th Senate district =

American legislative district

Iowa's 17th State Senate district
Senator
Izaah Knox; D

The 17th District of the Iowa Senate is located in central Iowa, and is currently composed of part of Polk County.

== Current elected officials ==
Izaah Knox is the senator currently representing the 17th District.

The area of the 17th District contains two Iowa House of Representatives districts:

- The 33rd District (represented by Ruth Ann Gaines)
- The 34th District (represented by Rob Johnson)

The district is also located in Iowa's 3rd congressional district, which is represented by Zach Nunn.

== List of representatives ==
Representative	Party	Dates	Residence	Notes
Jonathan Emerson Fletcher	Democrat	1852-1853	Muscatine, Iowa	
George W. Wilkinson	Whig	1854-1855	Muscatine, Iowa	
Jairus Edward Neal	Democrat	1856-1859	Marion County, Iowa	
Henry H. Williams	Democrat	1860-1863	Eddyville, Iowa	
John Chrisfield Hogin	Republican	1864-1865	Sigourney, Iowa	
Ezekiel Silas Sampson	Republican	1866-1868	Sigourney, Iowa	Elected district judge in 1868
John C. Johnson	Republican	1868-1869	Keokuk County, Iowa	
Joseph Warren Havens	Republican	1870-1873	Sigourney, Iowa	
Lafayette Young	Republican	1874-1877	Cass County, Iowa	
William Graham	Republican	1878-1879	Indianola, Iowa	
Mark Antony Dashiel	Republican	1880-1883	Indianola, Iowa	
Timothy Gordon Caldwell	Republican	1884-1891	Adel, Iowa	
Henry Franklin Andrews	Republican	1892-1895	Exira, Iowa	
Albert C. Hotchkiss	Republican	1896-1899	Adel, Iowa	
Frank M. Hopkins	Republican	1900-1908	Guthrie Center, Iowa	
George Cosson	Republican	1909-1910	Audubon County, Iowa	Elected as Iowa Attorney General in 1911
Anthony Milroy McColl	Republican	1911-1913	Woodward, Iowa	Resigned in 1913 to accept appointment to the State Board of Control
John Wasson Foster	Republican	1915-1920	Guthrie Center, Iowa	
Halleck J. Mantz	Republican	1921-1924	Audubon, Iowa	
Redfield Clipper Mills	Republican	1925-1928	Redfield, Iowa	
Frank Bissell	Republican	1929-1932	Dexter, Iowa	
George M. Hopkins	Republican	1933-1940	Bear Grove, Iowa	Died in office in 1940
Ai Miller	Republican	1941-1948	Gray, Iowa	
Glen Edwin Whitehead	Republican	1949-1956	Dallas County, Iowa	
Gerald William Prince	Republican	1957-1960	Guthrie Center, Iowa	
Harry L. Cowden	Republican	1961-1964	Guthrie County, Iowa	Two senators from district 14 are listed on the Iowa Official Register for General Assembly 60 & 61. This is the combined result of redistricting and election cycles and affected multiple districts.
C. Joseph Coleman	Democrat	1963-1964	Clare, Iowa	
Jack Schroeder	Republican	1963-1966	Davenport, Iowa	
Joseph W. Cassidy	Democrat	1965-1966	Guthrie Center, Iowa	
Robert Burns	Democrat	1967-1968	Johnson County, Iowa	
Minnette Fredrichs Doderer	Democrat	1969-1970	Johnson County, Iowa	
Rudy Van Drie	Republican	1971-1972	Story County, Iowa	
Barton L. Schwieger	Republican	1973-1974	Waterloo, Iowa	
Fred W. Nolting	Democrat	1975-1978	Waterloo, Iowa	
Richard L. Comito	Republican	1979-1982	Waterloo, Iowa	
Joseph J. Welsh	Democrat	1983-1994	Key West, Iowa	
Thomas L. Flynn	Democrat	1995-2002	Dubuque, Iowa	
Wally E. Horn	Democrat	2003-2012	Cedar Rapids, Iowa	
Jack Hatch	Democrat	2013-2014	Des Moines, Iowa	
Tony Bisignano	Democrat	2015-2022	Des Moines, Iowa	
Izaah Knox	Democrat	2023-present	Des Moines, Iowa	

== Historical district boundaries ==
Map	Description	Years effective	Notes
	Muscatine County	1852-1855	
	Marion County	1856-1859	
	Mahaska County	1860-1863	
	Keokuk County	1864-1873	
	Adair County Adams County; Cass County; Union County	1874-1877	
	Warren County	1878-1883	
	Audubon County Dallas County; Guthrie County	1884-1962	
	Scott County	1963-1966	
	Johnson County	1967-1970	
	Jasper County (partial) Story County	1971-1972	In 1970, the Iowa Legislature passed an amendment to the Iowa Constitution setting forth the rules for legislative redistricting in order to abide by the rules established by the Reynolds v. Sims Supreme Court case. The first reapportionment map created by the Republican controlled legislature was deemed unconstitutional, but was still used for the 1970 election.
	Black Hawk County (partial): Waterloo	1973-1982	
	Dubuque County (partial): Excluding; Dubuque; Jackson County	1983-1992	
	Delaware County (partial) Dubuque County (partial): Excluding; Dubuque; Jackson County	1993-2002	
	Linn County (partial): Cedar Rapids (partial); Region of the city south and west of the Cedar River and the Downtown District	2003-2012	
	Polk County (partial): Des Moines (partial); Region south of the Des Moines River, bounded approximately by 20th and 43rd Streets	2013-2022	
	Polk County (partial): Des Moines (partial); Northern half of the city	2023-present	

== See also ==
- Iowa General Assembly
- Iowa Senate
