= Donald Gettings =

American politician

Member of the Iowa Senate
- In office January 10, 1983 – January 10, 1999

Member of the Iowa House of Representatives
- In office May 31, 1977 – January 9, 1983

Personal details
- Born: Donald Edward Gettings; November 21, 1923 Wapello County, Iowa, United States
- Died: June 13, 2011 (aged 87) Ottumwa, Iowa, United States
- Party: Democratic

Donald E. Gettings (November 21, 1923 – June 13, 2011) was an American politician from the state of Iowa.

== Education and career ==
Gettings was born in Wapello County, Iowa in 1923 and graduated from Ottumwa High School in 1942. He served as a Democrat in both the Iowa House of Representatives from 1977 to 1983, and in the Iowa Senate from 1983 to 1999.

== Death ==
Gettings died in Ottumwa in 2011.

Iowa House of Representatives
Preceded by Mattie Harper	90th district 1977–1983	Succeeded by Robert Skow
Iowa Senate
Preceded by Julia Gentleman	33rd district 1983–1993	Succeeded by William Palmer
Preceded by Derryl McLaren	47th district 1993–1999	Succeeded by David Miller
