= Iowa's 39th Senate district =

American legislative district

Senate District 39
- Type: District of the Upper House
- Location: Southeastern Iowa
- Senator: Kevin Kinney (D)
- Parent organization: Iowa General Assembly

The 39th District of the Iowa Senate is located in eastern Iowa, and is currently composed of part of Linn County.

== Current elected officials ==
Kevin Kinney is the senator currently representing the 39th District.

The area of the 39th District contains two Iowa House of Representatives districts:

- The 77th District (represented by Amy Nielsen)
- The 78th District (represented by Jarad Klein)

The district is also located in Iowa's 2nd congressional district, which is represented by Mariannette Miller-Meeks.

== Past senators ==
The district has previously been represented by:

- William Palmer, 1983–1992
- James Riordan, 1993–1994
- Jo Ann Douglas, 1995–1998
- Jo Ann Johnson, 1999–2002
- David Lord, 2002
- Joe Bolkcom, 2003–2012
- Sandy Greiner, 2013–2014
- Kevin Kinney, 2015–present

== See also ==
- Iowa General Assembly
- Iowa Senate
