= John W. Jensen =

American politician (1926–2012)

Member of the Iowa Senate from the 11th district
- In office January 10, 1983 – January 12, 2003
- Preceded by: Stephen W. Bisenius
- Succeeded by: William Dotzler

Member of the Iowa Senate from the 19th district
- In office January 8, 1979 – January 9, 1983
- Preceded by: Clifford Burroughs
- Succeeded by: Norman Goodwin

Personal details
- Born: John William Jensen; March 28, 1926 York, Nebraska
- Died: October 26, 2012 (aged 86) Clarksville, Iowa
- Party: Republican

John William Jensen (March 28, 1926 – October 26, 2012) was an American politician.

== Personal life ==
He was born in York, Nebraska, on March 28, 1926, to parents Mathias and Bessie Jensen. The Jensen family moved to northeast Iowa in 1941. Upon graduating from Dike High School in 1944, John joined the United States Marines and was deployed to the South Pacific in the waning days of World War II. Jensen married Myrtle L. Shipp on May 29, 1948, and they jointly operated a farm near Plainfield, Iowa, for six decades. The couple raised five children. Jensen died on October 26, 2012.

== Political career ==
Jensen was a Republican member of the Iowa Senate for Bremer County from January 8, 1979, to January 12, 2003. Jensen held the District 19 seat until 1983, and thereafter represented District 11. During his legislative tenure, Jensen took an interest in the restoration, conservation, and preservation of the Iowa State Capitol.
