= Richard Varn =

American politician (born 1958)

Richard J. Varn (born 31 May 1958) is an American former politician.

Richard Varn was born in Des Moines, Iowa, to parents Leonard and Carolyn on 31 May 1958. After graduating from Solon High School in 1976, Varn found work with Colonial Bakery in Cedar Rapids. While employed at the bakery, he enrolled at the University of Iowa, where he completed his undergraduate degree in 1981. He then attended the UI College of Law for two years, which overlapped with the start of his first term in the Iowa House of Representatives. Varn left the bakery in 1985 and started working in construction. In 1988, he began serving as director of the Eastern Iowa Construction Alliance, and was also admitted to the Iowa bar. Varn was a Democrat who represented House District 54 for two terms, from 1983 to 1987, when he took office as a member of the Iowa Senate for District 27. In the midst of his second term as a state senator, Varn was redistricted and finished his political career in 1994, occupying the District 25 seat.
