= Jack W. Hester =

American farmer and politician

Member of the Iowa Senate
- In office January 8, 1979 – January 8, 1995
- Succeeded by: Tom Vilsack

Personal details
- Born: June 22, 1929 Modale, Iowa, U.S.
- Died: April 29, 1999 (aged 69) Honey Creek, Pottawattamie County, Iowa, U.S.
- Party: Republican
- Spouse: Joan Hester
- Children: 6
- Occupation: Farmer

Military service
- Branch/service: United States Air Force
- Battles/wars: Korean War

Jack William Hester (June 22, 1929 – April 29, 1999) was an American farmer and politician who served as a member of the Iowa Senate from 1979 to 1993.

== Early life and education ==
Born in Modale, Iowa, Hester graduated from Persia High School in Persia, Iowa in 1947. He served in the United States Air Force during the Korean War.

== Career ==
Hester worked as a farmer and livestock dealer. Hester served in the Iowa State Senate from 1979 to 1995 and was a Republican. He lived in Honey Creek, Pottawattamie County, Iowa. His wife Joan Hester also served in the Iowa General Assembly.
