= Julia Gentleman =

American politician (1931–2023)

Julia Brooks Gentleman

Member of the Iowa State Senate
- In office January 8, 1979 – January 13, 1991

Member of the Iowa State House of Representatives
- In office January 13, 1975 – January 7, 1979

Personal details
- Born: August 24, 1931 Des Moines, Iowa, U.S.
- Died: December 13, 2023 (aged 92)
- Party: Republican
- Spouse: Gregor Gentleman
- Children: 5
- Education: Northwestern University
- Occupation: homemaker

Julia Woolson Gentleman (née Brooks; August 24, 1931 – December 13, 2023) was an American politician in the state of Iowa. She served in the Iowa House of Representatives for the 65th district between 1975 and 1979. She then served in the Iowa Senate for the 43rd district from 1983 to 1991 and then for the 33rd district from 1979 to 1983.

== Early life ==
Julia Woolson Brooks was born on August 24, 1931, in Des Moines, Iowa. Her parents are John and Marguerite Brooks. She graduated from Roosevelt High School in Des Moines in 1949 and received her bachelor of science degree from Northwestern University in 1953. She married Gregor Gentleman the following year and the couple had three daughters and two sons.

== Political career ==
A Republican, she served in the Iowa House of Representatives from 1975 to 1979 (65th district) and the Iowa Senate from 1979 to 1991 (43rd district from 1983 to 1991 and 33rd district 1979 to 1983). She later changed party to become a Democrat.

== Death ==
Gentleman died on December 13, 2023, at the age of 92.
