= Milo Colton =

American politician

Member of the Iowa Senate from the 1st district
- In office January 10, 1983 – January 11, 1987
- Preceded by: Lucas DeKoster
- Succeeded by: Al Sturgeon

Personal details
- Born: March 25, 1943 (age 83)
- Party: Democratic

Milo Colton (born March 25, 1943) is an American politician who served in the Iowa Senate from the 1st district from 1983 to 1987.
