= Jack Rife =

American politician

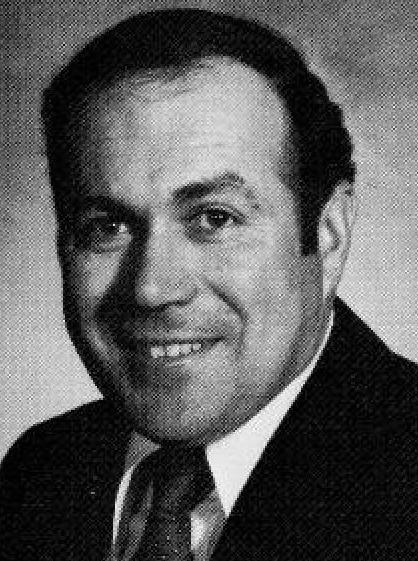

Member of the Iowa State Senate
- In office January 10, 1983 – January 7, 2001

Personal details
- Born: April 10, 1943 (age 83) Muscatine, Iowa, United States
- Party: Republican
- Spouse: Sharon Cooper
- Children: two
- Occupation: farmer

Jack Rife (born April 10, 1943) is an American politician in the state of Iowa.

Rife was born in Muscatine, Iowa. He attended Muscatine Community College and Iowa State University and is a farmer. A Republican, he served in the Iowa State Senate from 1983 to 2001 (29th district from 1983 to 1993 and 20th district from 1993 to 2001).
