= Ray Taylor (politician) =

American politician

Member of the Iowa State Senate
- In office 1973–1995

Personal details
- Born: June 4, 1923 Steamboat Rock, Iowa, United States
- Died: March 24, 2015 (aged 91) Steamboat Rock, Iowa, United States
- Party: Republican
- Occupation: retailer, farmer

Ray Allen Taylor (June 4, 1923 – March 24, 2015) was an American politician in the state of Iowa.

Taylor was born in Steamboat Rock, Iowa. He attended Baylor University and the University of Northern Iowa and was a farmer and retailer. He served in the Iowa State Senate from 1973 to 1995 as a Republican.
