= William D. Palmer =

American politician

Member of the Iowa State Senate
- In office 1969–1999

Member of the Iowa House of Representatives
- In office 1966–1969

Personal details
- Born: January 13, 1935 (age 91) Iowa City, Iowa, United States
- Party: Democratic
- Occupation: insurance executive

William D. Palmer (born January 13, 1935) is an American politician in the state of Iowa.

Palmer was born in Iowa City, Iowa. He graduated from East High School in Des Moines and is an insurance executive. He served in the Iowa State Senate from 1969 to 1999, and House of Representatives from 1965 to 1969, as a Democrat.

Party political offices
Preceded by John H. Cruise	Democratic nominee for Treasurer of Iowa; 1970	Succeeded by Albert L. Anderson
Preceded by Charles P. Miller	Democratic nominee for Lieutenant Governor of Iowa; 1978	Succeeded by Robert T. Anderson
