= E. H. Gibbs House =

United States national historic place

- E.H. Gibbs House
- U.S. National Register of Historic Places
- Location within Iowa Location within the United States
- Location: William Penn College campus, Oskaloosa, Iowa
- Coordinates: 41°18′31″N 92°38′41″W
- Area: less than one acre
- Built: 1903
- Architect: Frank E. Wetherell
- Architectural style: Classical Revival
- MPS: Oskaloosa MPS 1Oskaloosa MPS 2Oskaloosa MPS 3
- NRHP reference No.: 91001761
- Added to NRHP: December 13, 1991

The E. H. Gibbs House (also known as "The Elms at Ridge Place" and "Griffith Hall"), was built in 1903 in Oskaloosa, Iowa. It was designed by Frank E. Wetherell in Classical Revival architecture. It was listed on the National Register of Historic Places in 1991.

== Owner ==
E. H. Gibbs settled in town in 1869 and became a prominent member of the community. He was a banker, real estate developer, founder of an insurance company, and a developer of a coal mine. He helped to bring the railroad to town, and founded the Oskaloosa Times and served as its first editor.

== Builder ==
Gibbs hired Oskaloosa architect Wetherell to design the house, which was completed in 1903. It was the third large commission Wetherell had received in a three-year period; the other two being St. James Episcopal Church and the Oskaloosa Public Library. Known contemporaneously as "The Elms at Ridge Place," the two-story brick house replaced a frame house at the same location, which had been the family farm. The E. H. Gibbs house architecture demonstrated Wetherell's continued interest in neoclassical detailing, but was his first executed in brick. Wetherell relocated to Des Moines, Iowa three years after the house was completed.

== Later use ==
The Gibbs family gave the house to neighboring William Penn University, where it was renamed Griffith Hall. It was used for offices and music rooms. The house was listed on the National Register of Historic Places on December 13, 1991. The building has subsequently been torn down.
