= Capitol Theater (Burlington, Iowa) =

- The Capitol Theater
- U.S. National Register of Historic Places
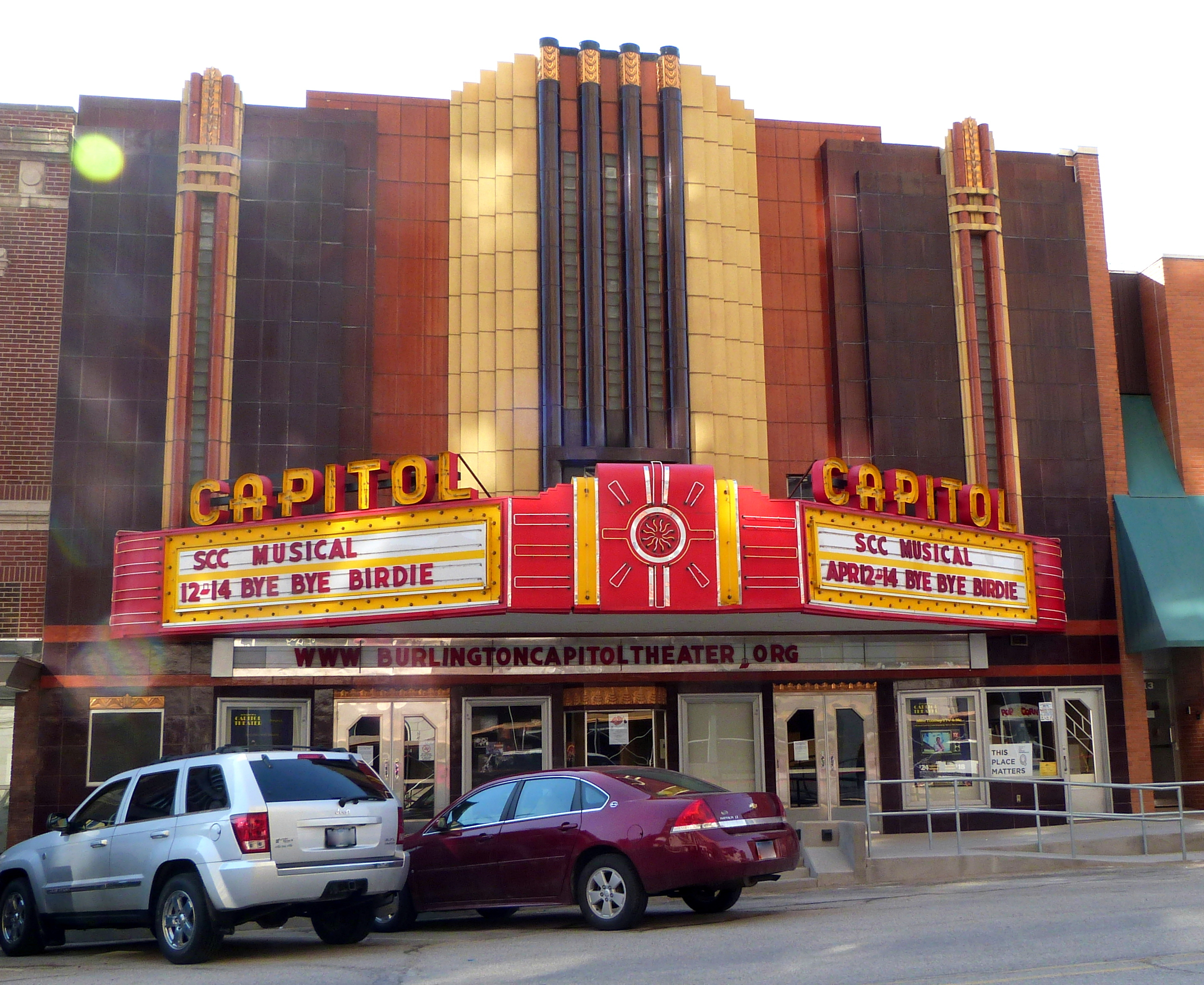

- Location within Iowa Location within the United States
- Location: 211 N. 3rd St. Burlington, Iowa
- Coordinates: 40°48′34″N 91°6′11″W
- Area: less than one acre
- Built: 1937
- Architect: Wetherell and Harrison
- Architectural style: Art Deco
- NRHP reference No.: 96001373
- Added to NRHP: November 22, 1996

The Capitol Theater was a 700-seat theater in Burlington, Iowa. Opened in 1937, with the first showing being Mark Twain's classic The Prince and the Pauper. The theater was both a movie theater and an auditorium used for performances (though the stage was only used for approximately an hour during its Grand Opening, and was never used again). The theater closed in March 1977, the final showing was the Stephen King horror classic Carrie.

== Early Theater Plans ==
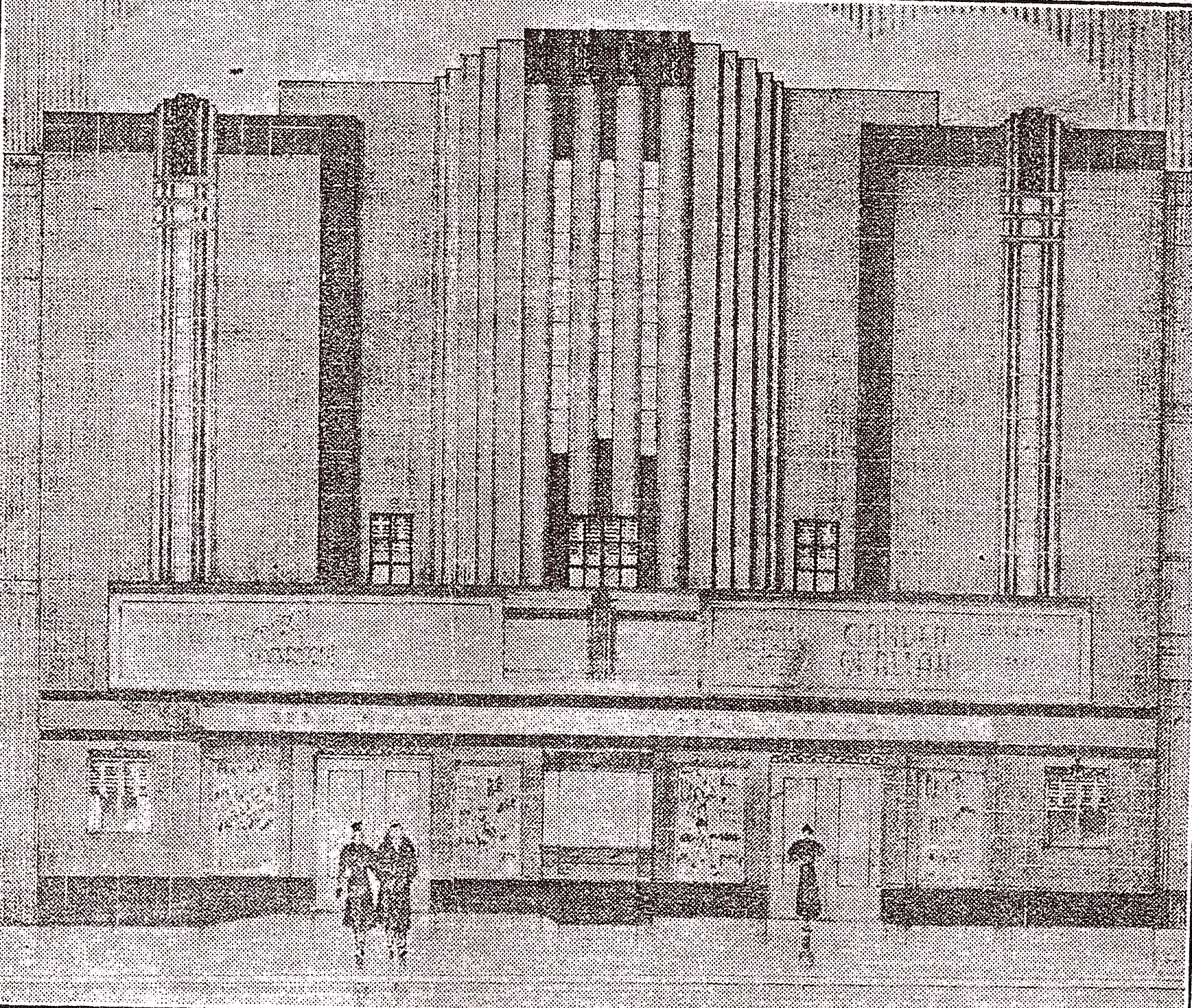
A sketch drawing of The Capitol Theater.

On December 29, 1936, plans to create a modernized theater were finished. It was approved by the firm of Wetherell and Harrison architects and approved for the Central States Theater Corporation. The theater was built in between the I.S.U. and Eisfeld building on Third Street. The front of the theater extended five to six feet above the I.S.U. building.

The exterior of the building had terra cotta and structural glass. It also had shades of burgundy and brown, with gold trimming. Electric signs were placed to show present and coming attractions.

The lobby had a rich terrazzo floor. The walls were wood veneer with stainless steel trimming. The ceiling was decorated in a deep color with modern colored lights. The foyer will have a two-tone carpet, walls painted and glazed in color, the ceiling richly ornamented with lights of the indirect type and with several color. Both the lobby and the foyer will be spacious, as the entire building will be used for the theater.

The auditorium was decorated in acoustic tile of colors with rich ornamented side wall and ceiling panels, including a cornice at the junction of the side walls and ceiling decorated in deep colors. The lights being used for the auditorium were a new design. They could be switched to make a combination of colors either turned on or dimmed down.

The seating was upholstered and in colors that matched the interior color scheme.

The overall cost in constructing the theater with equipment was $65,000. In 2011 standards, it cost more than $1,015,349.65.

On April 12, 1937, the theater was expected to be opened on June 1. Due to management decision, the opening date was postponed for another month to finish cleaning up and decorating. It was opened on July 1, 1937.

The first movie that was premiered on opening day was The Prince and the Pauper, starring Errol Flynn. The show began at 6:30 p.m. Adult admission cost 36 cents and 10 cents for children.

== Closing of the theater ==
On March 29, 1977, the theater was forced to close down. The Central States Theaters Inc. opened West I and II movie theaters at Westland Mall as a replacement to the theater relocated in West Burlington, Iowa (the West I & II closed roughly 15 years after opening, to be replaced by a much larger 8 screen multiplex, which closed to be replaced by a theater that has an entrance within the main mall area). The theater had begun falling into disrepair for some time prior to its closing, being left neglected by its owners, it had begun to lose the luster it once had. The last movie screened in the theater before the closing was Carrie, starring Sissy Spacek and John Travolta. The Capitol was open as a theater for 39 years, and sat neglected for 33 more years. The Central States Theater Group was dissolved in 1992, being bought out by CEC Theaters, outliving the Capitol by 15 years. The building was placed on the National Register of Historic Places in 1987, as one of two surviving art deco theaters designed by Wetherall and Harrison left in the state; the other being the Charles Theater in Charles City. The Malek Theatre in Independence, Iowa, was entered on the National Register of Historic Places in 2008, being the last theater designed by Wetherall and Harrison making it one of "three" surviving art deco theaters left in the state.

== Renovation and reopening ==
Early in 2005, the Capitol Theater Foundation a 501 (c) 3 organization, bought the building, and began fund raising to buy the adjacent ISU building and to relight the marquee. After successfully raising funds the Capitol Theater's marquee was relit in December 2005 after decades of being dark. The foundation engaged Metzger Johnson Architects of Burlington, Iowa to design a plan to create a performing arts center by joining the Capitol Theater with the adjacent ISU building. After receiving an IJOBS grant for $1,000,000, historic tax credits and raising over a million dollars locally; planning began in 2010 for extensive renovations, which included all new seats, a new, larger stage, the use of the former ISU building as an annex for dressing rooms, restrooms, and loading of props, and backdrops, as well as an art gallery. The renovations on the building itself retained the original walls in the outer lobby, the exposed the original terrazzo floor, repainting the auditorium, installation of 370 new seats, a fifteen-foot extension of the stage, a new picture screen, state-of-the-art digital projection equipment, as well as a digital surround audio system, new lighting fixtures, and scrubbing of the outer facade of the building, at a cost of over $3 million. New roofs were installed over both buildings. The main entrance doors, which had been replaced with all glass doors in the 1970s were replaced with doors that replicated the original doors of 1937. The theater reopened June 1, 2012, and is available for rent. There are Sunday matinees taking place throughout the year. The Capitol Theater Foundation owns all property associated with the two buildings, as well as all rights for scheduling events.
