= Capt. Nicholas W. and Emma Johnson House =

Historic house in Iowa, United States

- U.S. National Register of Historic Places
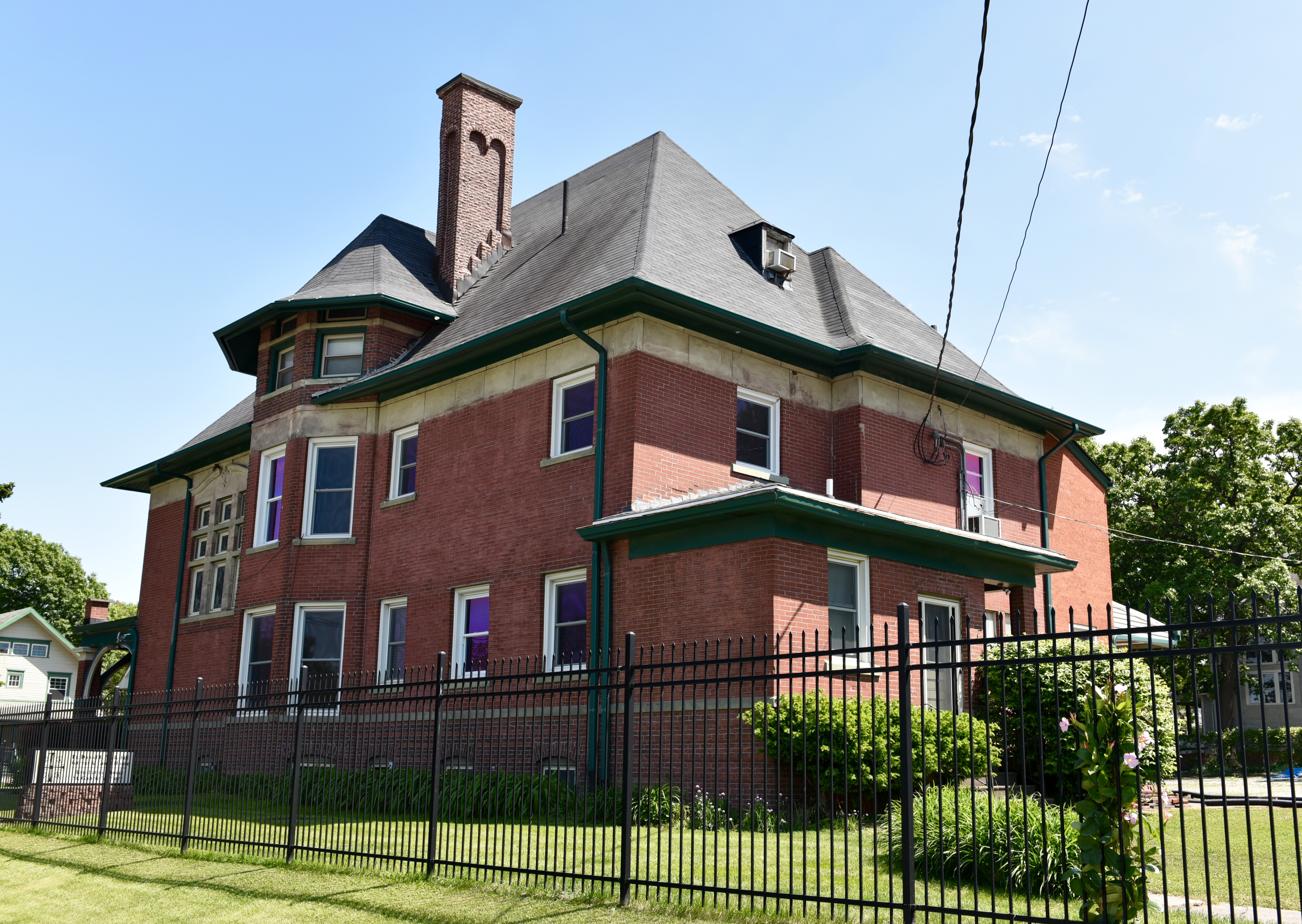
- The rear of the house.

- Location within Iowa Location within the United States
- Location: Jct. of 21st St. & University Ave. Des Moines, Iowa
- Coordinates: 41°36′0.8″N 93°38′43.5″W
- Area: less than one acre
- Built: 1896
- Built by: Charles Weitz
- Architect: Oliver O. Smith
- Architectural style: Renaissance Revival; Queen Anne
- NRHP reference No.: 90001854
- Added to NRHP: December 6, 1990

The Capt. Nicholas W. and Emma Johnson House is a historic building located in Des Moines, Iowa. The house is an unusual example in Des Moines of Châteauesque design elements added to a late Queen Anne style house. The design was attributed to Des Moines architect Oliver O. Smith and was built by local contractor Charles Weitz. The 2½-story brick structure features large massing, a prominent front-facing gable, two full-height polygonal side bays, steeply pitched hipped roof, smooth and rough wall surfaces, contrasting courses, and the fleur-de-lis motif executed in stone, ceramic tile, and glass.

The house was built for Nicholas and Emma Johnson. He was a sea captain who later farmed in Madison County before he and his second wife Emma settled here in her hometown. While it was built as a single-family house, it was converted into a funeral home in 1933 and it remained as such at least into the 1990s. It was listed on the National Register of Historic Places in 1990.
