= Statue of Mahaska =

Monument in Oskaloosa, Iowa, United States

Chief Mahaska
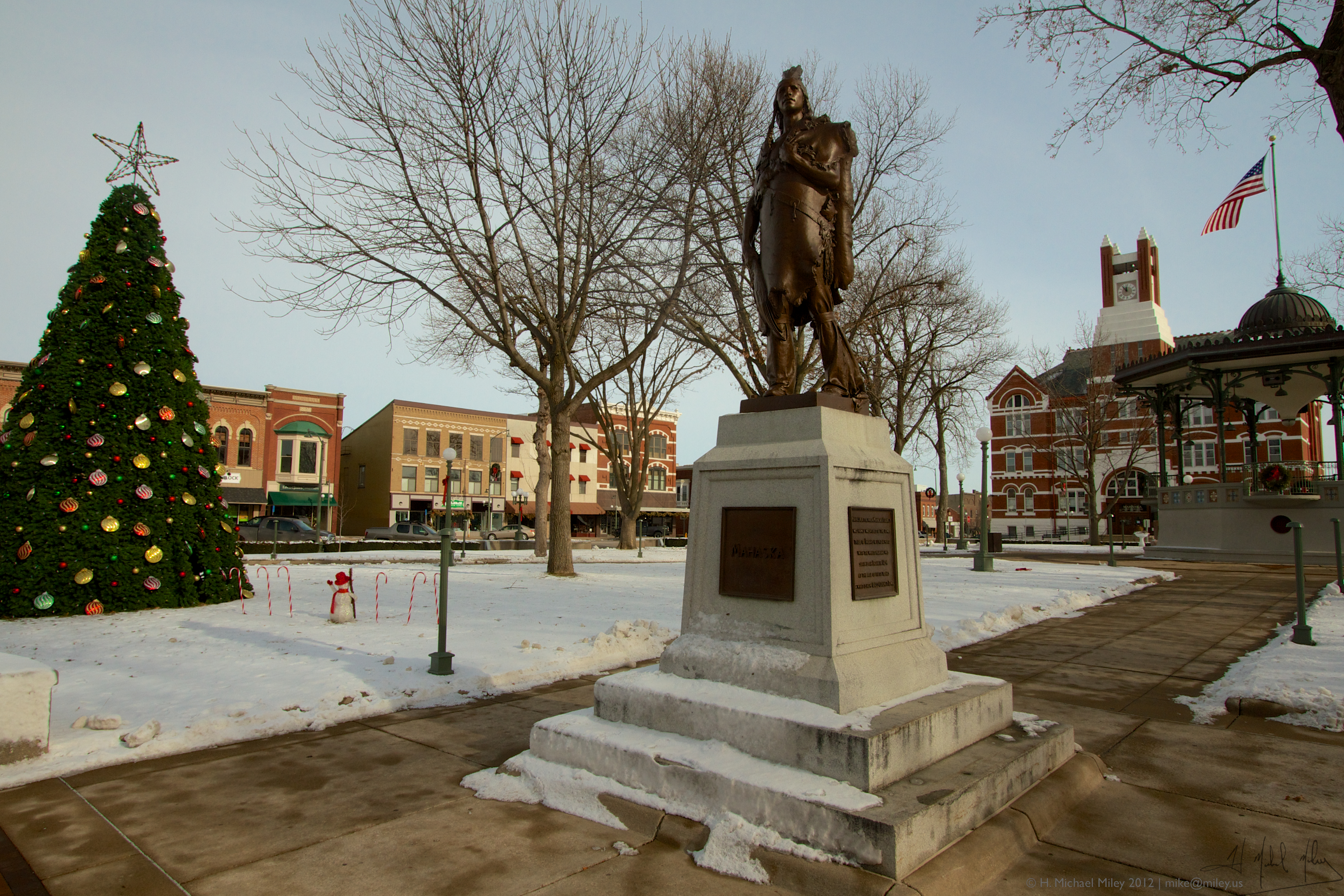
- The statue in 2012, with the Mahaska County Courthouse in the background
- Interactive map of Chief Mahaska
- Location: Mahaska County Courthouse, Oskaloosa, Iowa, United States
- Coordinates: 41°17′41.5″N 92°38′41.5″W
- Designer: Sherry Edmundson Fry
- Fabricator: E. Gruet Jeune (statue)
- Builder: McCall Granite Works (pedestal)
- Type: Statue
- Material: Bronze (statue); Granite (pedestal)
- Dedicated date: May 12, 1909
- Dedicated to: Mahaska

Chief Mahaska is a bronze statue in City Park in Oskaloosa, Iowa, United States. The statue was designed by sculptor Sherry Edmundson Fry and depicts its namesake, Mahaska, who was a Native American chief of the Iowa people in the early 19th century. The monument was commissioned by J. D. Edmundson, a retired businessman of Des Moines, Iowa, in honor of his father, William Edmundson, who had been involved in the organization of Mahaska County, Iowa, where Oskaloosa is located. It was dedicated on May 12, 1909.

== Design ==
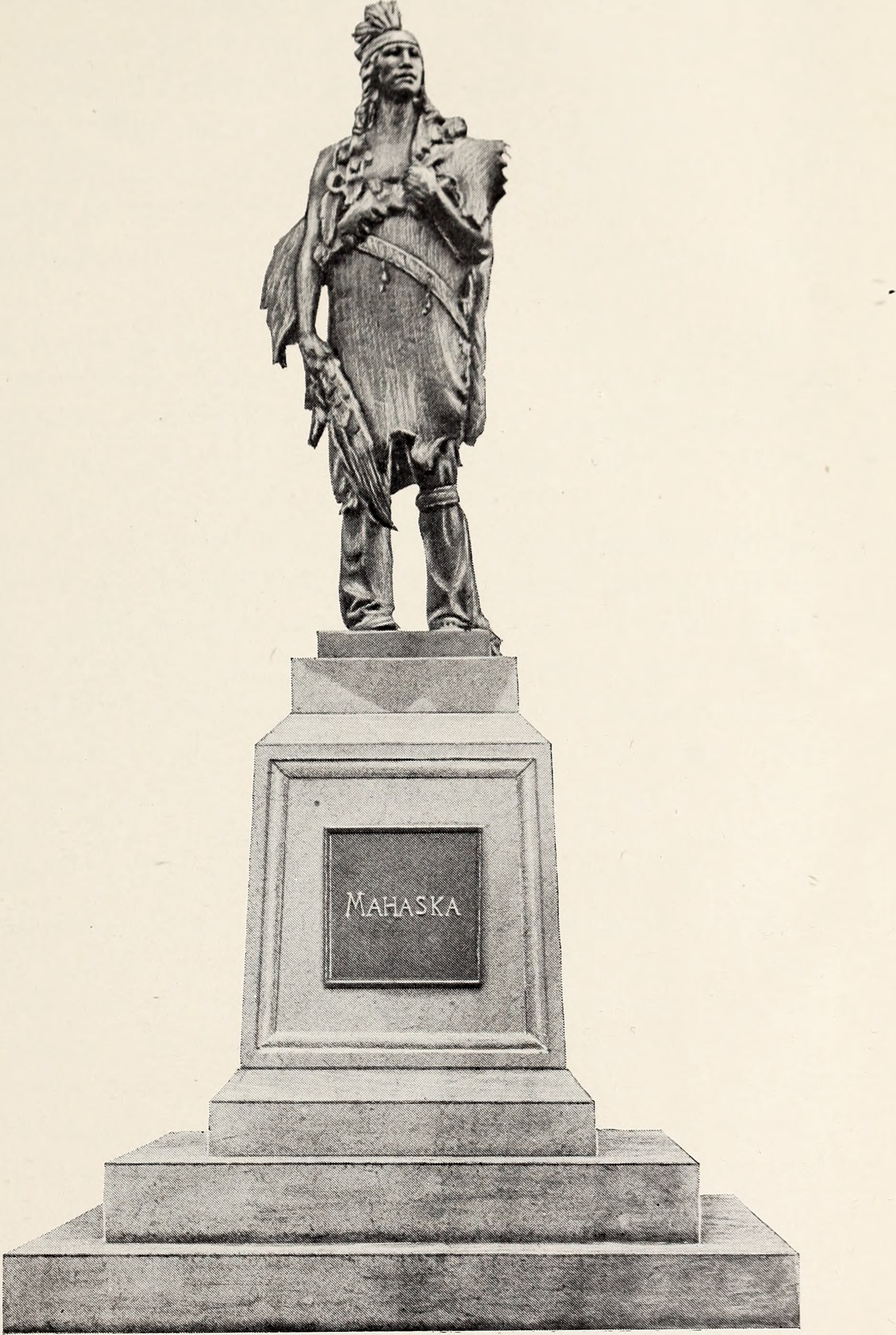
A 1909 depiction of the monument

The monument is located on the western side of Oskaloosa's City Park, near a bandstand. It consists of a bronze statue of Mahaska standing atop a granite pedestal, facing west. Mahaska, who is depicted in life-size, wears a hide robe, pants, moccasins, and a war bonnet. He is holding his robe with his left hand, while his right hand holds a bird's wing. Marks for the foundry (E. GRUET JNE FONDEUR / PARIS) and the sculptor (S.E. Fry / 1907) are present on the base of the sculpture. The pedestal has four sides, with a bronze plaque on each side. The front plaque, located on the monument's west side, bears the inscription "MAHASKA", while the other plaques read as follows:

MAHASKA FOR WHOM MAHASKA COUNTY / WAS NAMED WAS A CHIEF OF THE IOWAY / TRIBE OF INDIANS HE LIVED AT PEACE / WITH THE WHITE MAN AND WAS / SLAIN BY AN INDIAN IN 1834 / AT THE AGE OF FIFTY YEARS / IN WHAT IS NOW CASS COUNTY IOWA

— South side

PRESENTED TO THE CITY OF OSKALOOSA / BY / JAMES DEPEW EDMUNDSON / IN MEMORY OF HIS FATHER / WILLIAM EDMUNDSON / WHO SETTLED IN IOWA IN 1836 AND WHO / AS SHERIFF UNDER APPOINTMENT BY THE / TERRITORIAL LEGISLATURE HAD CHARGE / OF THE ORGANIZATION OF MAHASKA COUNTY / WHICH WAS COMPLETED ON THE 13 DAY OF MAY 1844

— East side

THE IOWAYS A POWERFUL TRIBE OF INDIANS / FOR WHICH THE STATE OF IOWA WAS NAMED / AT ONE TIME INHABITED THE SOUTHEASTERN / PORTION OF THE TERRITORY WHICH NOW / CONSTITUTES THE STATE OF IOWA AND WHICH / INCLUDES IN ITS BOUNDARIES / THE COUNTY OF MAHASKA

— North side

== History ==
The statue was commissioned by J. D. Edmundson, a retired banker and businessman of Des Moines, Iowa, in honor of his father, William Edmundson. William had been involved in the organization of Mahaska County, Iowa, having been commissioned to do so by the government of the Iowa Territory, and had been the first white person to settle in the county. In 1905, J. D. Edmundson commissioned Sherry Edmundson Fry, a sculptor from Iowa, to create the memorial. For the project, Fry chose to create a statue of Mahaska, a tribal chief of the Iowa people and the namesake for Mahaska County, who had been a contemporary of William's. The project would be one of his first major commissions for Fry.

A 1905 depiction of Mahaska

In preparation for the sculpture, Fry lived on the Indian reservation of the Sac and Fox Tribe of the Mississippi in Iowa in Tama County, Iowa, to learn more about the lives of Native Americans. An elderly chief on the reservation served as a model for the statue, though the identity of the model is unknown. Fry completed his work on the statue in 1907, with casting performed by the foundry of E. Gruet Jeune of Paris. Meanwhile, the pedestal was provided by Henry Lewis McCall in 1909, with work on the structure done by the McCall Granite Works company. In early 1909, the sculpture was displayed in Philadelphia as part of an art exhibition hosted by the Pennsylvania Academy of the Fine Arts.

The monument was dedicated on May 12, 1909. The unveiling ceremony was conducted by local and state chapters of the Improved Order of Red Men (Note: The name of this organization is given as the "Approved Order of Red Men" in the source.) and was a major event for the city, with schools closing for the day and about 20,000 spectators being present. John F. Lacey, a former member of the United States House of Representatives, was the event's speaker, while S. H. M. Byers, who wrote "The Song of Iowa", delivered a newly written poem called "Mahaska" at the event. Semira Ann Phillips, who had been the first teacher in Mahaska County, performed the act of unveiling the monument.

In 1912, a bandstand made of concrete and steel was constructed near the statue, replacing a wooden structure. In 1934, a benchmark for surveying was added on the northwest side of the monument's base by the United States Coast and Geodetic Survey. In a 1986 book, the monument was noted as being on the National Register of Historic Places in Mahaska County, Iowa, having been listed as a contributing object to the Oskaloosa City Park and Band Stand. In 1994, the monument was surveyed as part of the Save Outdoor Sculpture! project.

== Reception ==
In contemporary coverage, Fry received positive reviews for the work. According to a 1909 article in The Christian Science Monitor, the sculptor received a medal from the Salon in Paris for the work and was invited to become a member of the "International Society of Men of Arts and Letters". Further, in a 1938 work compiled by the Federal Writers' Project, Fry reportedly won a medal for the piece as well as "a three-year scholarship in Rome". O.H. Sample, in a 1909 article in the Overland Monthly, called the piece a "handsome bronze statue" and said that the depiction of the clothing had "been used to good sculptural effect by the sculptor". According to Sample, Fry was admitted into the National Sculpture Society as a result of the work. In a book published in 1921, sculptor Lorado Taft said in a review that the sculpture "may not be absolutely precise on ethnological lines but it is unquestionably a handsome figure most skilfully modeled". In a 2008 book, historian Greg Olson said that the statue is a "romanticized" depiction of Mahaska that shows him as a "noble savage".

== See also ==
- 1909 in art
- List of Improved Order of Red Men buildings and structures
- National Register of Historic Places listings in Mahaska County, Iowa
