= Siegmeister =

Siegmeister is a surname. Notable people with the surname include:

- Elie Siegmeister (1909–1991), American composer, educator, and author
- Walter Siegmeister (1903–1965), also known as Raymond W. Bernard, American practitioner of alternative medicine

== See also ==
- Singmaster
