= Drake Municipal Observatory =

Observatory in Iowa, USA

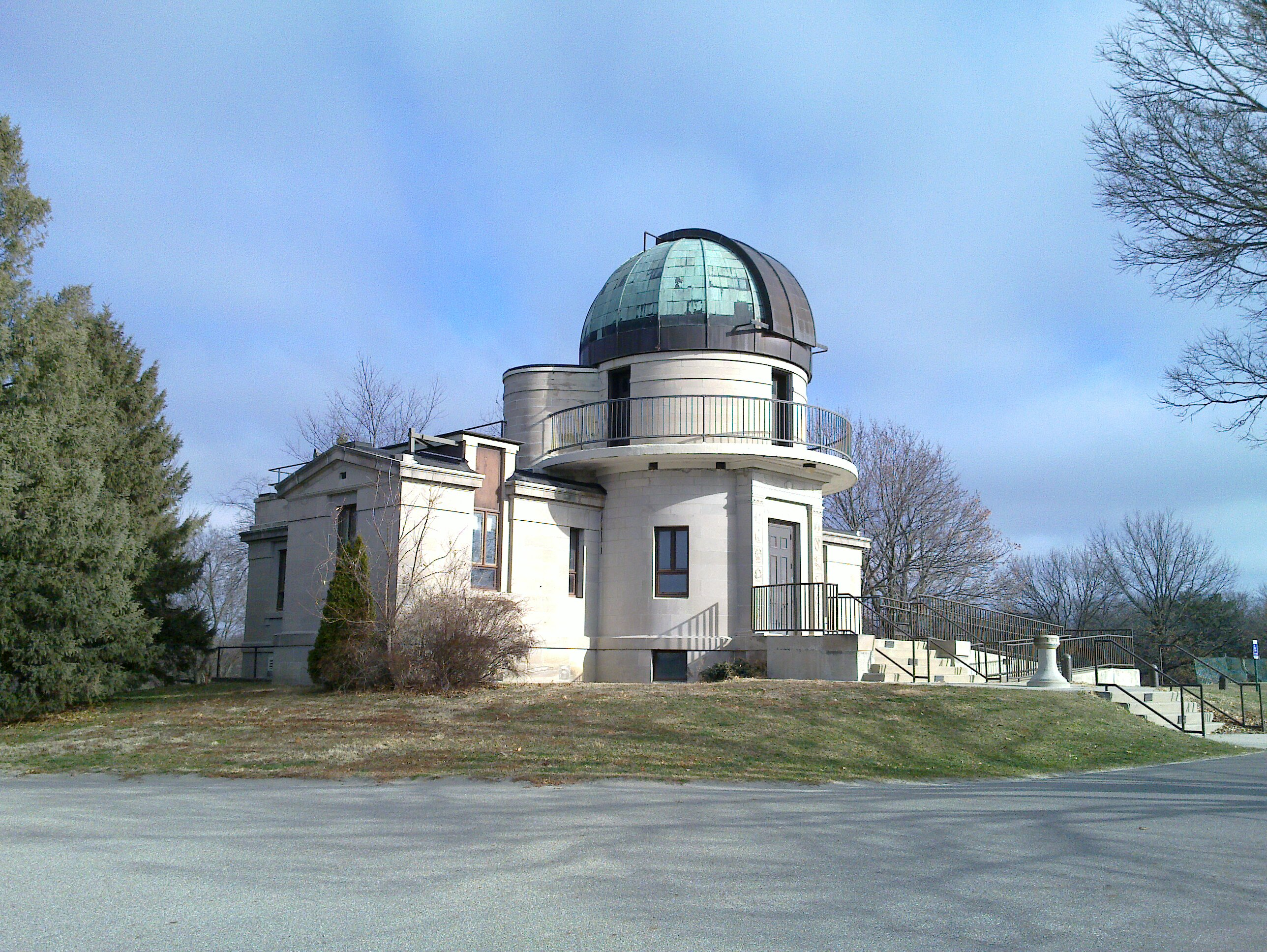
- View from the South West
- Alternative names: Drake Observatory
- Organization: Drake University
- Location: 4898 Observatory Road, Des Moines, Iowa, 50311, US
- Coordinates: 41°35′43.86″N 93°41′16.22″W
- Altitude: 846 ft (258 m)
- Weather: See the Clear Sky Forecast
- Established: 1921

Telescopes
- John Brashear: 8.25-inch aperture refractor

The Drake Municipal Observatory is an astronomical observatory in Des Moines, Iowa. It is jointly operated by Drake University and the city of Des Moines, and is located within the Waveland Golf Course between the 17th green and the 18th tee (the highest point in Des Moines at the time of construction). The observatory presents public programs on Friday nights throughout the spring through autumn months and, weather permitting, attendees can observe celestial objects with a variety of telescopes.

The main dome of the observatory houses an 8.25 inch refracting telescope, on a German equatorial mount. The ashes of the astronomer Daniel Walter Morehouse, and those of his wife Myrtle, are interred within the wall of the observatory rotunda.

== History ==
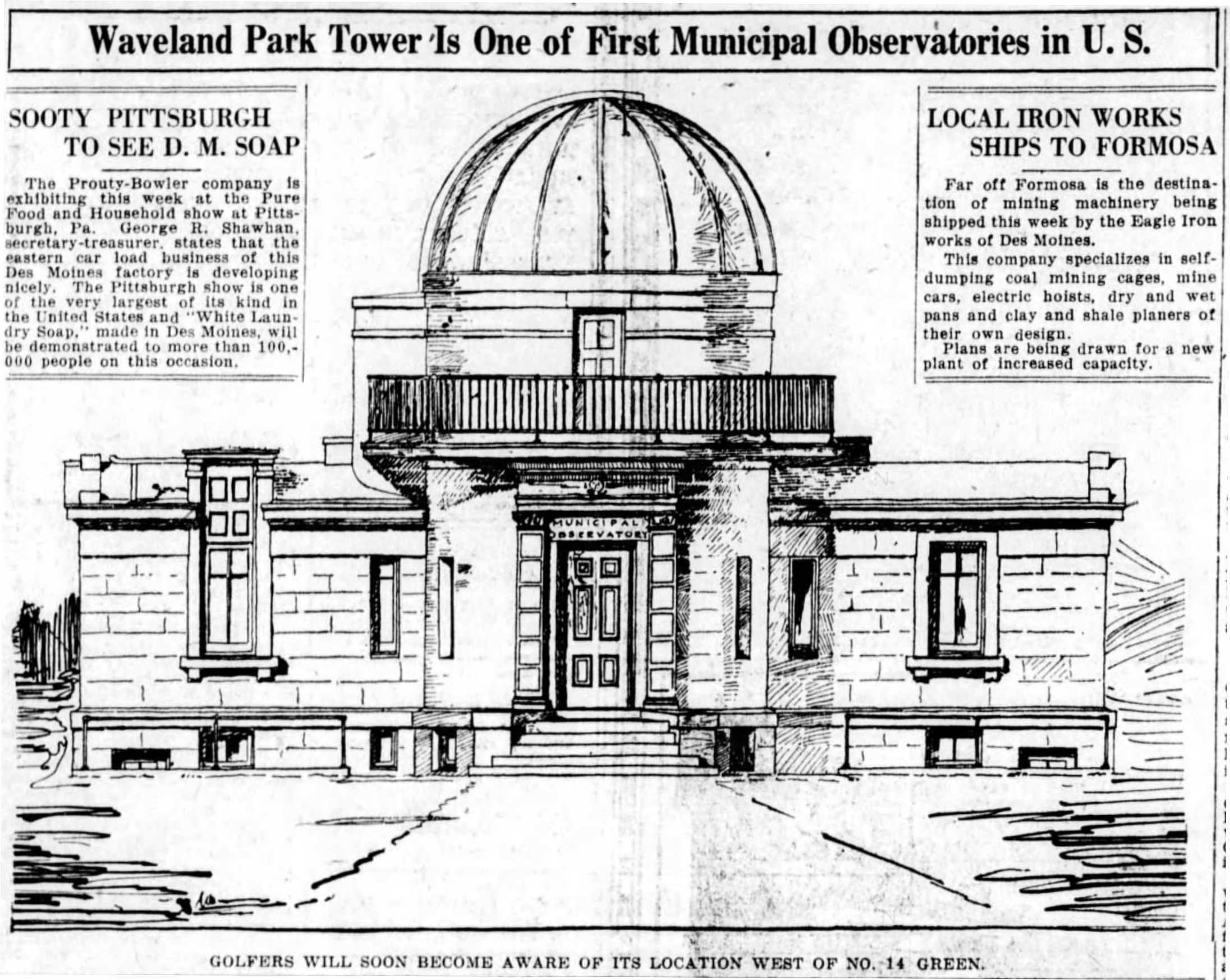
An illustration of the observatory that appeared in the Des Moines Register in 1921

The 8.25 inch refractor housed in the observatory's copper dome was purchased from Warner & Swasey (with optics produced by John Brashear), and delivered to the university in 1894. Initially the telescope was housed in a dome atop the Science Hall on the university campus. This location was soon found to have been a poor choice; nearby trees and buildings obscured the horizon, and the vibrations produced by passing streetcars disturbed observations.

In the early 20th century a search was begun for a more suitable location to house the telescope, and a site on the Waveland Golf Course (nearly two miles west of the university campus) was chosen. The city of Des Moines agreed to provide the site (0.23 acres) and maintain the exterior of the building if Drake University would supply and maintain the observatory instruments, maintain the building interior, and offer public programs. The observatory building was constructed from Indiana limestone during the years 1920–1921, and was dedicated on November 5, 1921. At the time of its opening, the observatory housed a meridian transit telescope which was used to provide official time for the city of Des Moines (in addition to the main telescope in the dome).

The observatory building was designed by Des Moines architect Frank E. Wetherell. The cost of building's construction was approximately $200,000 ($3.61 million in 2025).

== Features ==
The door to the main entrance is surrounded by two faux Corinthian columns into which the 12 signs of the zodiac have been carved. Above the door is carved an ancient Egyptian depiction of the Sun. At the building's dedication, Morehouse explained the reason for selecting decorative motifs from a variety of cultures:

"Thus in review before our minds passes the ancient Chaldean, Persian, Egyptian, Greek and Roman civilizations, each of which contributed its part to the science to which this building is dedicated."

Just inside the main entrance, the floor of the rotunda beneath the dome features a mosaic of the Solar System, with the eight planets depicted in the relative positions they had on October 1, 1921. The first floor contains a classroom which can accommodate up to 200 people.

The basement originally contained living quarters for Morehouse, and a photographic darkroom.

== Public Night Presentations ==
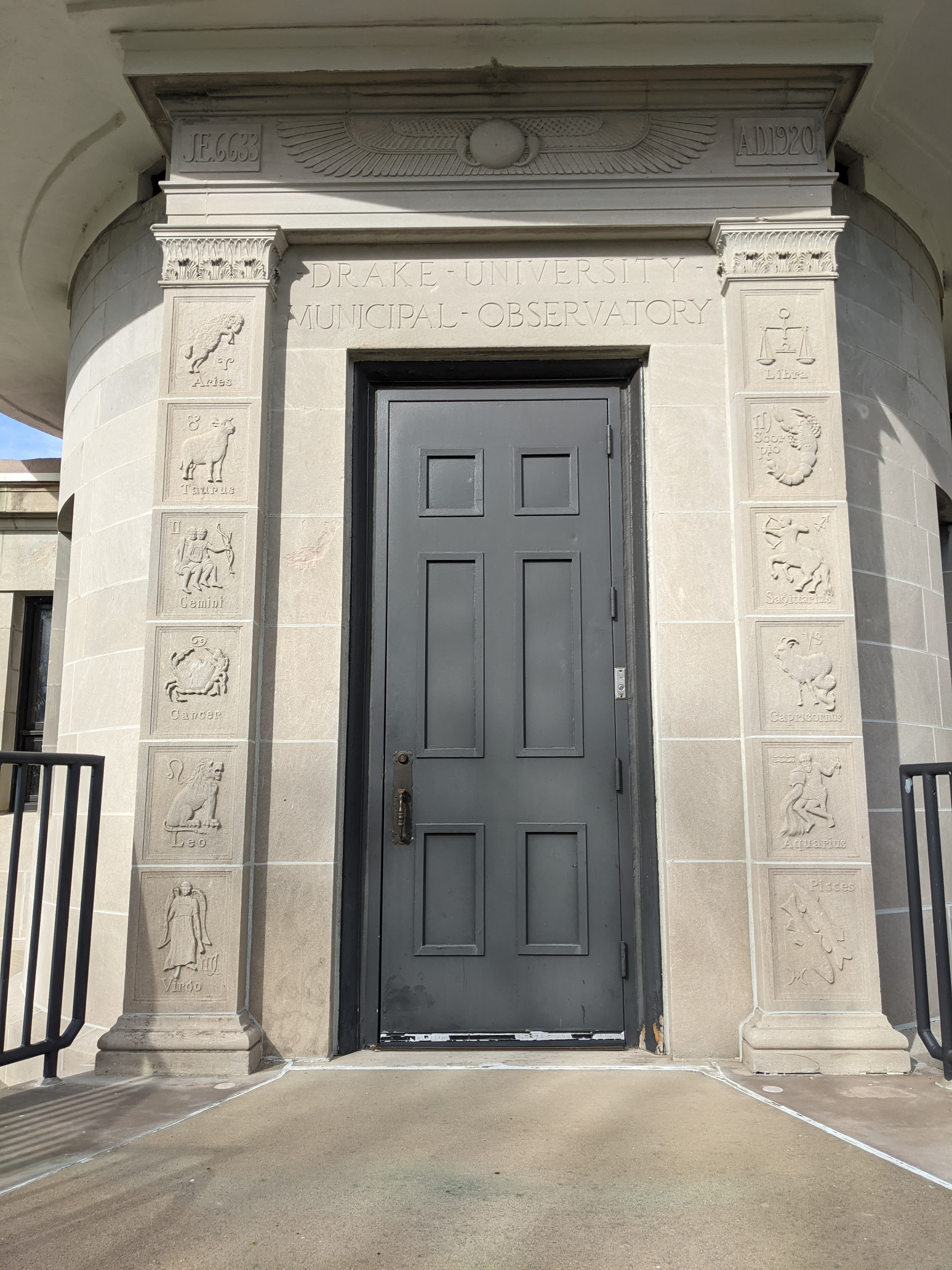
The main entrance

The observatory has public night presentations on Friday evenings during the spring through autumn months. A lecture on an astronomical topic is given at 8:00 PM, followed by observing with the historic 8.25 inch refractor, as well as an assortment of more modern small telescopes. Access to the observatory is not through the Waveland Golf Course's main entry; observatory visitors should drive to the site via Observatory Road, which originates on the west side of Polk Blvd, two blocks south of University Ave. Despite being located in the middle of a golf course, there is handicap parking adjacent to the building, and the building itself has been modified to be wheelchair accessible through the main entrance. The latest information on Observatory lectures is posted online. These presentations have been attended by over 2,300 visitors per year.

Due to the COVID-19 pandemic, the 2020 public lectures were held online.

== See also ==
- List of astronomical observatories
