= Burns United Methodist Church =

- U.S. National Register of Historic Places
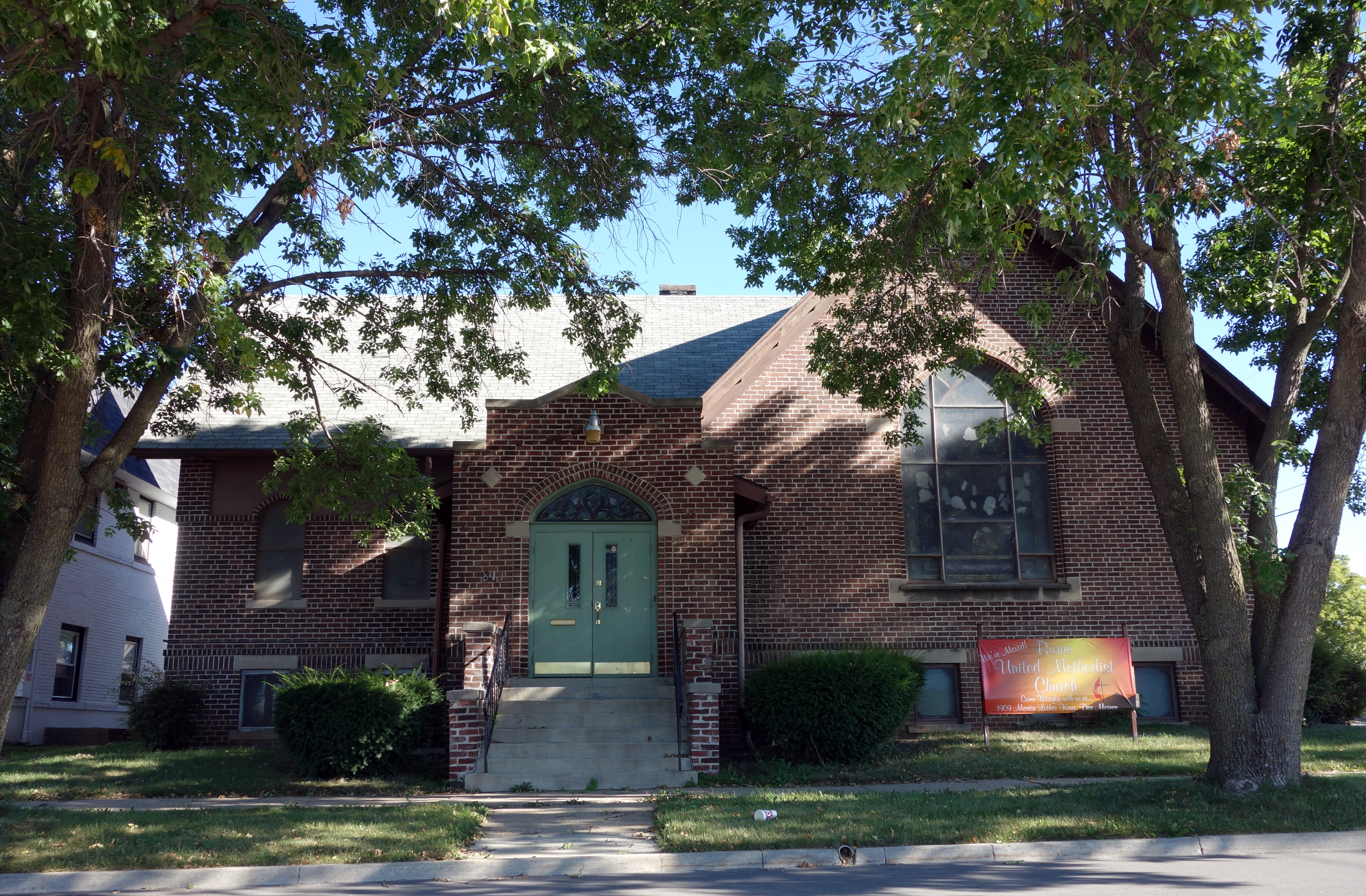

- Location within Iowa Location within the United States
- Location: 811 Crocker St. Des Moines, Iowa
- Coordinates: 41°35′37″N 93°37′43.5″W
- Built: 1912
- Architect: Wetherell & Gage
- NRHP reference No.: 77000546
- Added to NRHP: June 15, 1977

Burns United Methodist Church is located in Des Moines, Iowa, United States. Its previous building was listed on the National Register of Historic Places in 1977.

== History ==
The congregation was established in 1866 as the Black Methodist Episcopal Church. The church was eventually named for Francis Burns, the first black bishop of Methodist Episcopal Church. They first worshiped in a segregated school building for black children. That was the first of six different locations the congregation called home until they bought this building from the German Emmanual Methodist congregation in 1930. The congregation sponsored a variety of fundraising events to raise the money to buy the building, including dinners and a singing quartet of church members who toured the state. A fire damaged the building in the 1940s, and the congregation repaired the damages conforming to the building's original design. They remained here until they moved to their present location at 1909 Martin Luther King Jr., Parkway in April 2011.

== Architecture ==
The German Methodist congregation built the historic building in 1912. It was designed by the Des Moines architectural firm of Wetherell and Gage. The single-story brick building was built on a raised basement. The sanctuary is on the east side of the building and the pastor's study and classrooms are located on the west side. The two sides sit at right angles to each other with a small, gable-roofed entrance with a parapet set into the angle of the two sections. Most of the windows on the main floor are Tudor arches with brick hoods. The exception is the large Gothic arch window in the sanctuary. There is also half-timberwork on the west elevation.
