= Oskaloosa City Hall =

- U.S. National Register of Historic Places
- U.S. Historic district – Contributing property
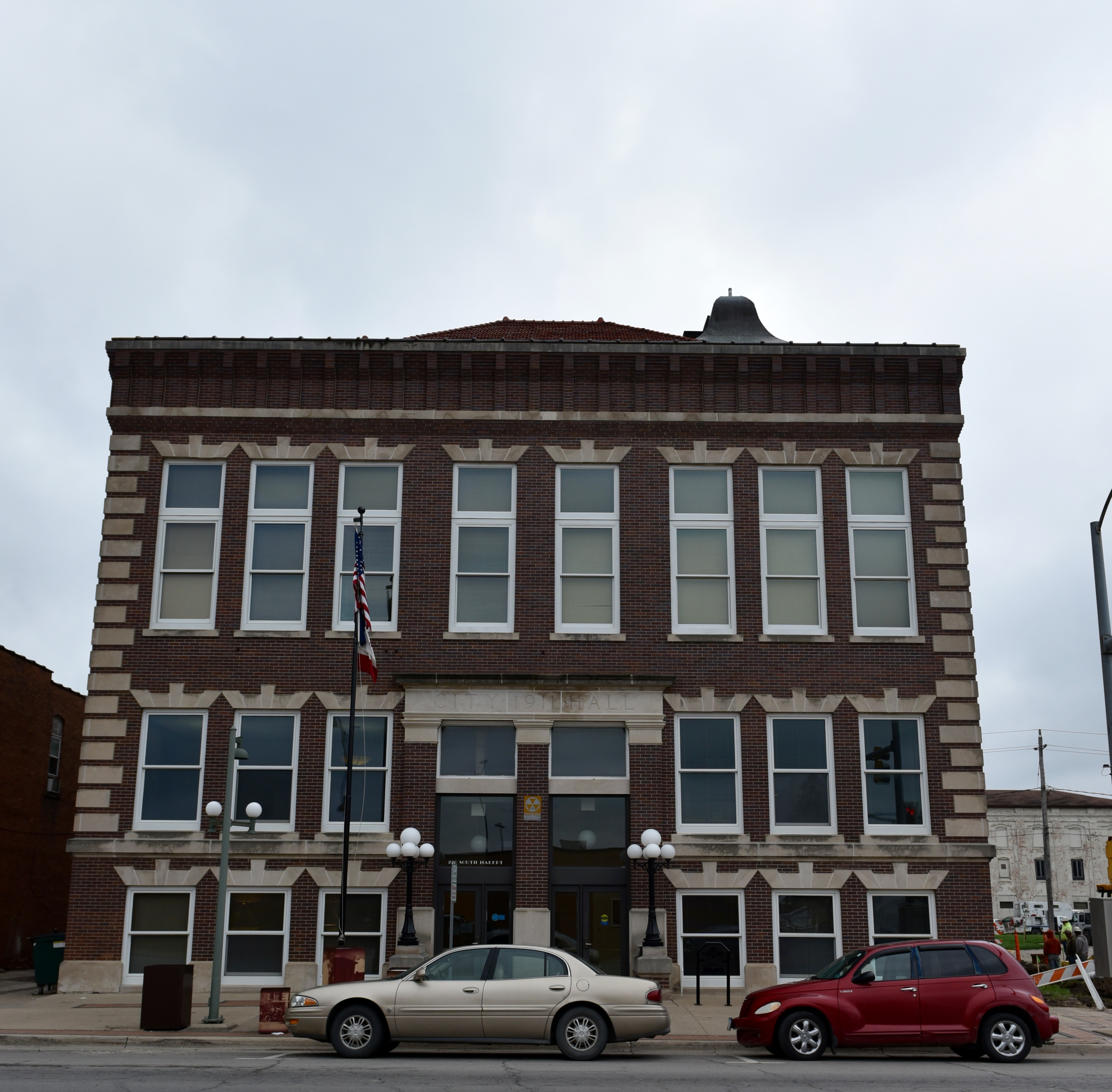

- Location within Iowa Location within the United States
- Location: Jct. of S. Market St. and 2nd Ave. E., NE corner Oskaloosa, Iowa
- Coordinates: 41°17′37″N 92°38′40″W
- Area: Less than 1 acre (0.40 ha)
- Built: 1911
- Architect: Frank E. Wetherell; S.B. Sinclair
- Architectural style: Renaissance Revival
- Part of: Oskaloosa City Square Commercial Historic District (ID86000716)
- MPS: Oskaloosa MPS
- NRHP reference No.: 91001764
- Added to NRHP: December 13, 1991

The Oskaloosa City Hall is a historic government building located in Oskaloosa, Iowa, United States. It was designed by Des Moines architect Frank E. Wetherell, an Oskaloosa native, in the Renaissance Revival style. It was originally designed along with the adjoining fire station in 1905. The buildings were designed for phased construction, and the city council decided to build the fire station first. It was individually listed on the National Register of Historic Places in 1991. Previously it had been included as a contributing property in the Oskaloosa City Square Commercial Historic District.
