= Singmaster =

Singmaster is a surname. Notable people with the surname include:

- C. F. and Mary Singmaster, owners of the C.F. and Mary Singmaster House
- David Singmaster (1938–2023), British mathematician, after whom Singmaster's conjecture is named
- Elsie Singmaster (1879–1958), American writer

== See also ==
- Songmaster
