= St. James Episcopal Church (Oskaloosa, Iowa) =

- U.S. National Register of Historic Places
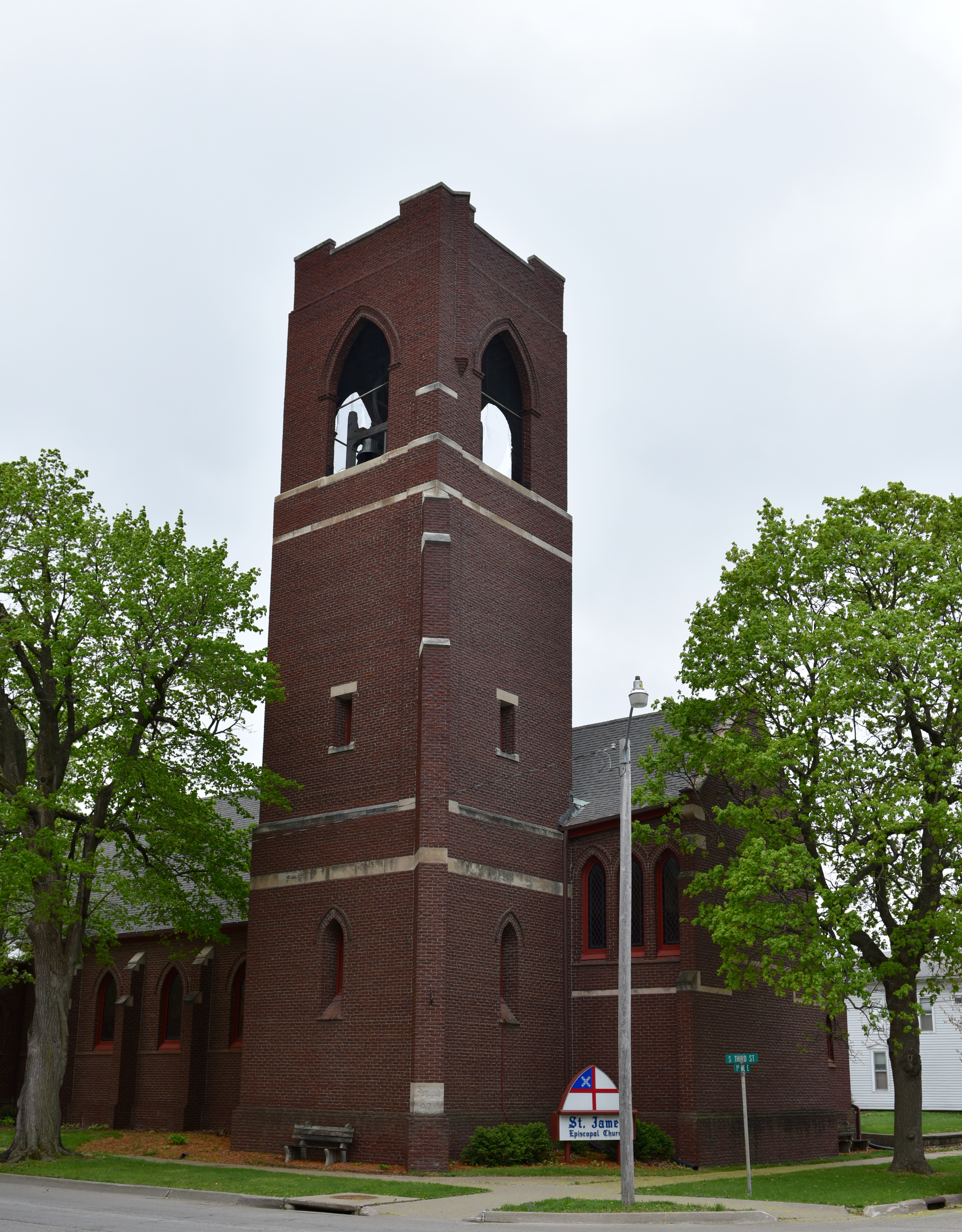

- Location within Iowa Location within the United States
- Location: Southwestern corner of the junction of 1st Ave. and S. 3rd St., Oskaloosa, Iowa
- Coordinates: 41°17′39″N 92°38′29″W
- Area: less than one acre
- Built: 1901
- Built by: Henry Wetherell
- Architect: Frank E. Wetherell
- Architectural style: Late Gothic Revival
- MPS: Oskaloosa MPS
- NRHP reference No.: 91001762
- Added to NRHP: December 13, 1991

St. James Episcopal Church is a parish of the Diocese of Iowa located in Oskaloosa, Iowa, United States. It was listed on the National Register of Historic Places in 1991.

In 2015, the church reported 58 members; in 2023, it reported 23 members. No membership statistics were reported in 2024 national parochial reports. Plate and pledge financial support reported by the church in 2024 was $15,333. Average Sunday Attendance (ASA) reported in 2024 was 12 persons. This was a relative decrease from ASA of 22 persons reported in 2018.

== History ==
The parish was begun on May 27, 1855, and it was incorporated in August 1857. A lot was bought for a church on South Market Street, the location of the Oskaloosa Public Library, but it was exchanged for the corner lot at First Ave East and South Third Street. A Gothic Revival style church and a rectory were built on the property in 1869 for $12,000. It was a frame structure that measured 28 by 50 feet (8.5 by 15.2 m), and it was consecrated on November 20, 1870.

The church building was moved to the back of the property in 1896 in preparation for the construction of the present church in 1900. Frank E. Wetherell, a parishioner, designed the Late Gothic Revival style building. It was built of brick with a bell tower by Henry Wetherell for $20,000. The new church was consecrated on February 2, 1902. The old church is attached to the south side of the new church, and it is veneered in brick. The congregation worshiped without an organ until 1920 when $2,500 was raised to purchase one.

The 45-foot (14 m) tower holds 10 bells that were given by Alice Williams Bennett in memory of her parents Micajah and Virginia Williams. The tower was severely damaged by lightning in 1927 and had to be rebuilt.

The church's interior features an oak carved altar, lectern, pulpit, rood screen, and altar rail. Stained glass windows line the east and west walls. The original frame church was renovated in the 1950s for classrooms, office space, and a children's chapel. In 1985 a pipe organ, which had been built for a church in Bloomer, Wisconsin in 1930, was purchased a rebuilt in the church. It contains 1,126 pipes. A new oak altar was built in 1993 so the priest can face the congregation during the service. It was consecrated on March 29, 1994. The original church was remodeled again in 2001 to create a new fellowship hall. While it was air-conditioned at the time the rest of the church building was air-conditioned in 2004.
