= Thomas I. Stoner House =

Historic house in Iowa, United States

- U.S. National Register of Historic Places
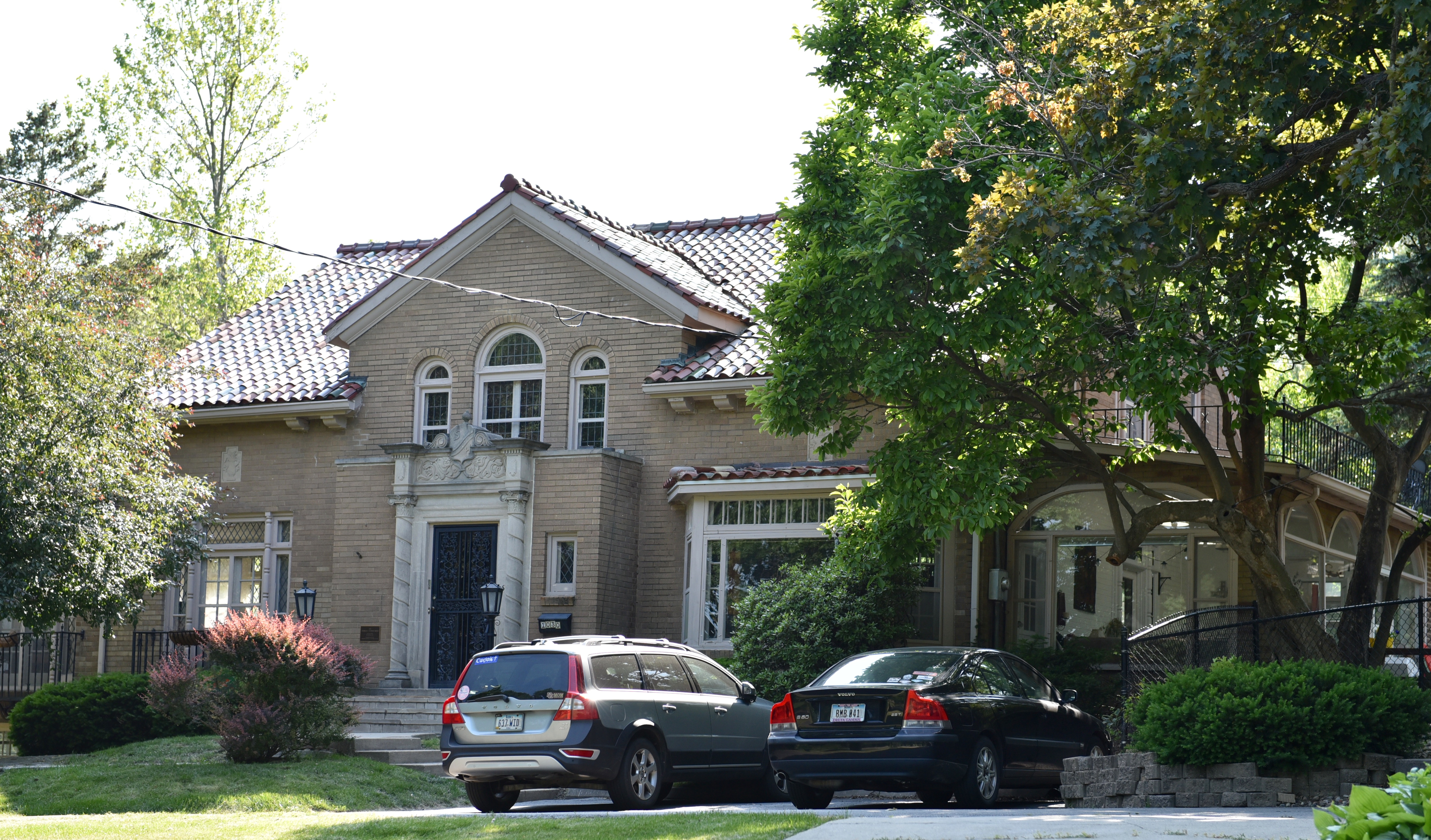
- From May 2016

- Location within Iowa Location within the United States
- Location: 1030 56th St. Des Moines, Iowa
- Coordinates: 41°35′46.6″N 93°41′39.3″W
- Area: less than one acre
- Built: 1931
- Architect: Wetherell & Harrison
- Architectural style: Late 19th and 20th Century Revivals, Spanish eclectic
- NRHP reference No.: 92000006
- Added to NRHP: February 12, 1992

The Thomas I. Stoner House in Des Moines, Iowa, also known as The Highlands, was designed by Wetherell & Harrison and was built in 1931. It includes elements of Spanish Eclectic and Late 19th and 20th Century Revivals architecture. It overlooks the Waveland Golf Course and it has a ceramic tile roof.

It was listed on the National Register of Historic Places in 1992. It was deemed significant for its architecture, as "an excellent, virtually unaltered example of the Spanish eclectic style."
