= Oskaloosa Fire Station =

- U.S. National Register of Historic Places
- U.S. Historic district – Contributing property
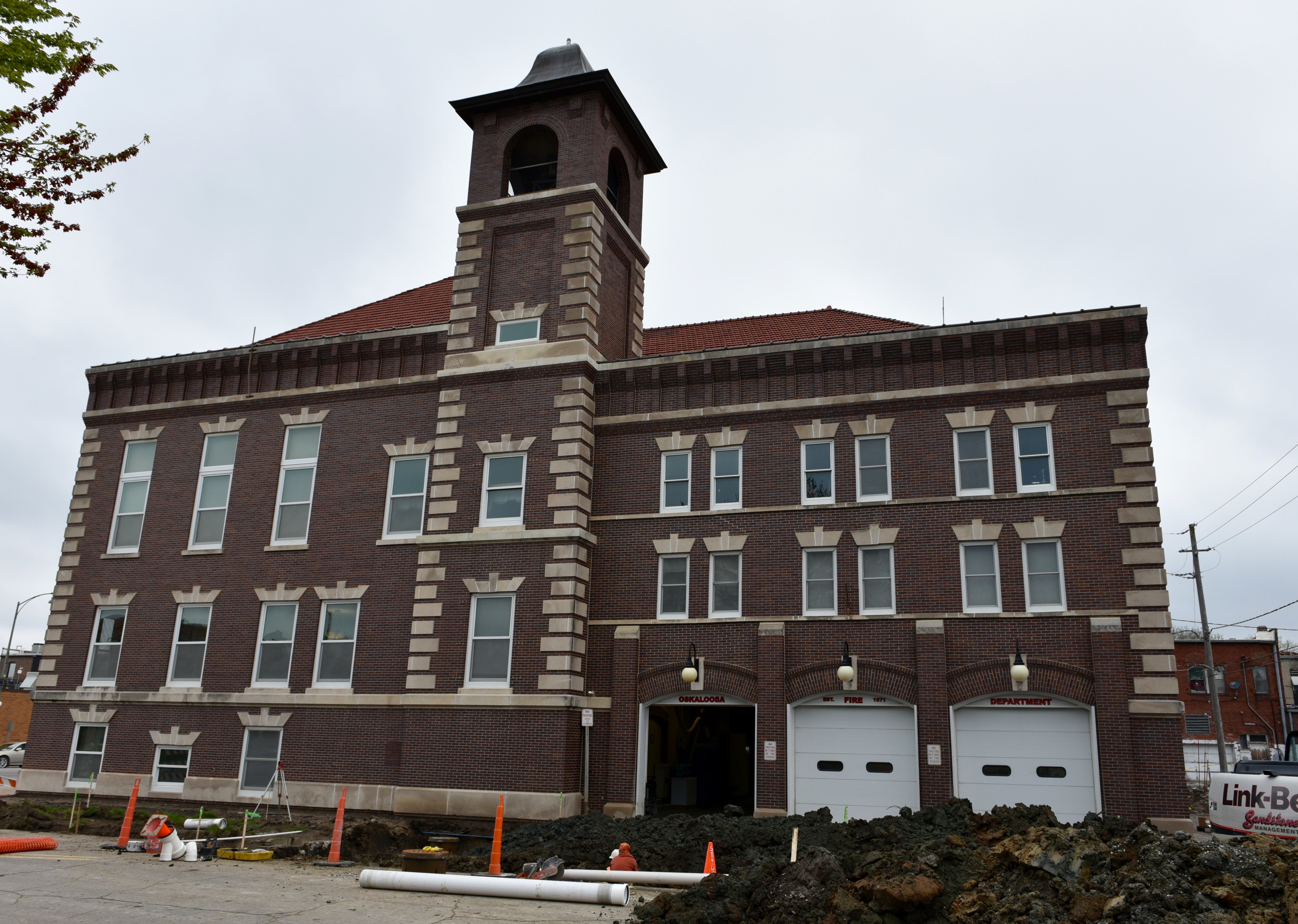

- Location within Iowa Location within the United States
- Location: 109-111 2nd Ave. E., Oskaloosa, Iowa
- Coordinates: 41°17′37″N 92°38′39″W
- Area: less than one acre
- Built: 1908
- Built by: Guthrie & Holtz of Albia
- Architect: Frank E. Wetherell
- Architectural style: Renaissance Revival
- Part of: Oskaloosa City Square Commercial Historic District (ID86000716)
- MPS: Oskaloosa MPS
- NRHP reference No.: 91001763
- Added to NRHP: December 13, 1991

The Oskaloosa Fire Station is a historic building located in Oskaloosa, Iowa, United States. It was designed by Des Moines architect Frank E. Wetherell, an Oskaloosa native, in the Renaissance Revival style. It was originally designed along with the adjoining city hall in 1905. The buildings were designed for phased construction, and the city council decided to build the fire station first. Completed in 1908, it is a three-story brick building with a 4½-story bell tower. The fire station was individually listed on the National Register of Historic Places in 1991. Previously it had been included as a contributing property in the Oskaloosa City Square Commercial Historic District.
