= Laurens Carnegie Free Library =

- U.S. National Register of Historic Places
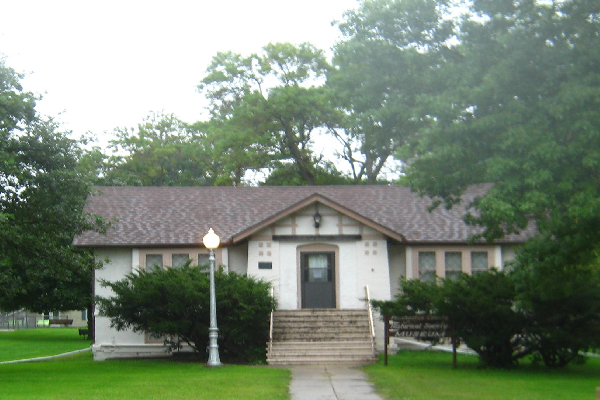

- Location within Iowa Location within the United States
- Location: 263 N. 3rd St. Laurens, Iowa
- Coordinates: 42°50′57″N 94°51′06″W
- Area: less than one acre
- Built: 1910
- Built by: W.J. Zitterell
- Architect: Wetherell and Gage
- Architectural style: Mission Revival
- NRHP reference No.: 74000804
- Added to NRHP: November 5, 1974

Laurens Carnegie Free Library is a historic building located in Laurens, Iowa, United States. It was designed by the Des Moines architectural firm of Wetherell and Gage and completed in 1910. The Carnegie Corporation of New York had accepted the application for a grant from Laurens' literary association for $3,800 on February 6, 1907. The Mission Revival structure measures 42 by 22.5 feet (12.8 by 6.9 m), and has a projecting pavilion for the main entrance. An addition was built onto the rear of the building in 1955. The building now houses the Pocahontas County Historical Museum. It was listed on the National Register of Historic Places in 1974.
