= Mahaska County Courthouse =

Historic place in Iowa, United States

- U.S. National Register of Historic Places
- U.S. Historic district – Contributing property
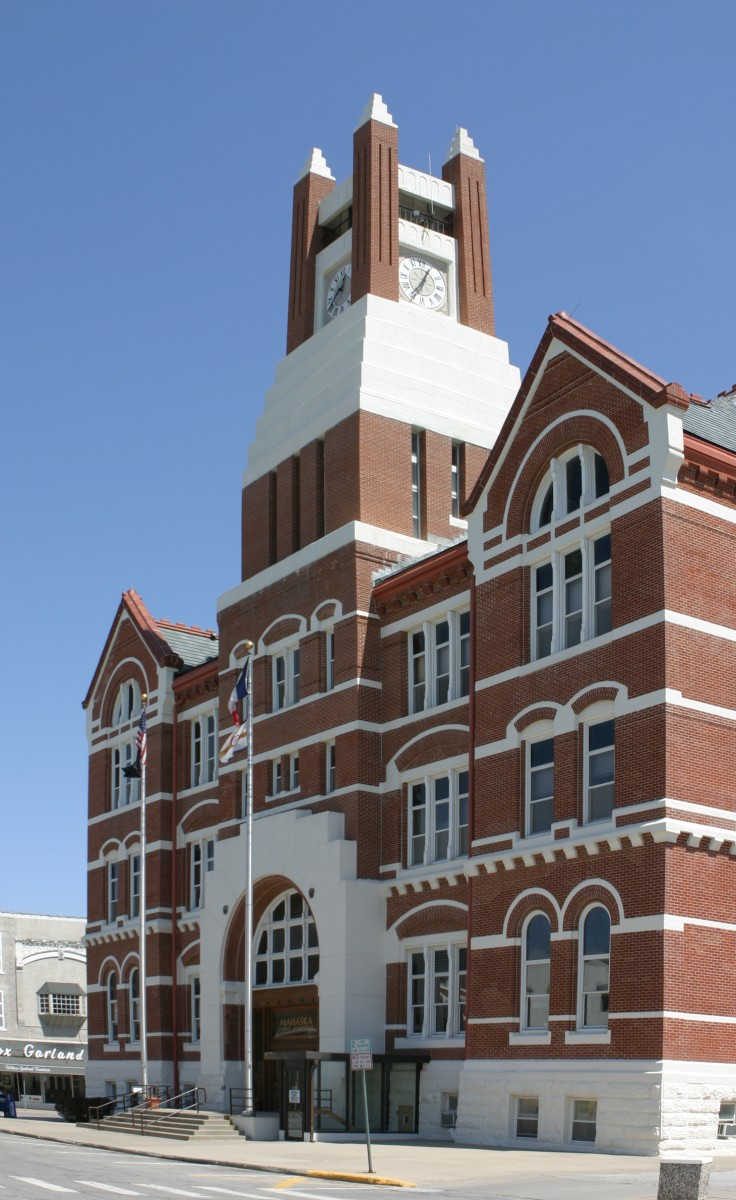

- Location within Iowa Location within the United States
- Interactive map showing the location for Mahaska County Courthouse
- Location: Market St. and 2nd Ave. Oskaloosa, Iowa
- Coordinates: 41.295077°N 92.643495°W
- Area: less than one acre
- Built: 1886
- Built by: O.J. King Co. & John Volk
- Architects: H.C. Koch & Co.
- Architectural style: Romanesque Revival
- Part of: Oskaloosa City Square Commercial Historic District (ID86000716)
- MPS: County Courthouses in Iowa TR
- NRHP reference No.: 81000255
- Added to NRHP: July 2, 1981

The Mahaska County Courthouse in Oskaloosa, Iowa, United States, was built in 1886. It was individually listed on the National Register of Historic Places in 1981 as a part of the County Courthouses in Iowa Thematic Resource. In 1986 it was included as a contributing property in the Oskaloosa City Square Commercial Historic District. The courthouse is the second building the county has used for court functions and county administration.

== History ==
Mahaska County's first courthouse was built during the winter of 1844–1845. It was a two-story frame structure that measured 28 by 50 feet (8.5 by 15.2 m). It also served as a church and opera house. The county discontinued using the building in 1855 and rented office space in town to carry out the various county functions. It was rented out by the county until it was sold in 1867 for $3,800. The old courthouse was moved to a different location, and a bank was built on the old location. Concern over county records led to plans to build a new courthouse, but the county failed to pass a bond referendum and continued to rent office space. The present courthouse was built in the Romanesque Revival style on part of the Oskaloosa public park. It was built for $132,000 and was dedicated in 1886. It was designed by the Milwaukee architectural firm of H.C. Koch & Company, and built by the O.J. King Company.

== Architecture ==
The courthouse is a 3½-story red brick and stone structure. It is built on a rusticated stone foundation. The main facade has a large stone arch that surrounds the first story entrance. The central tower has a square clock tower with spires at the top. It was altered in 1934 and it now has an Art Deco effect, giving the building a rather odd appearance. It was originally taller with a pyramid-shaped roof. Stone beltcourses run along the building at the lintel and impost level. The roofline has gabled wall dormers with arched windows. The grounds feature a statue of Mahaska, for whom the county is named.
