= Scottish Rite Consistory Building (Des Moines, Iowa) =

- U.S. National Register of Historic Places
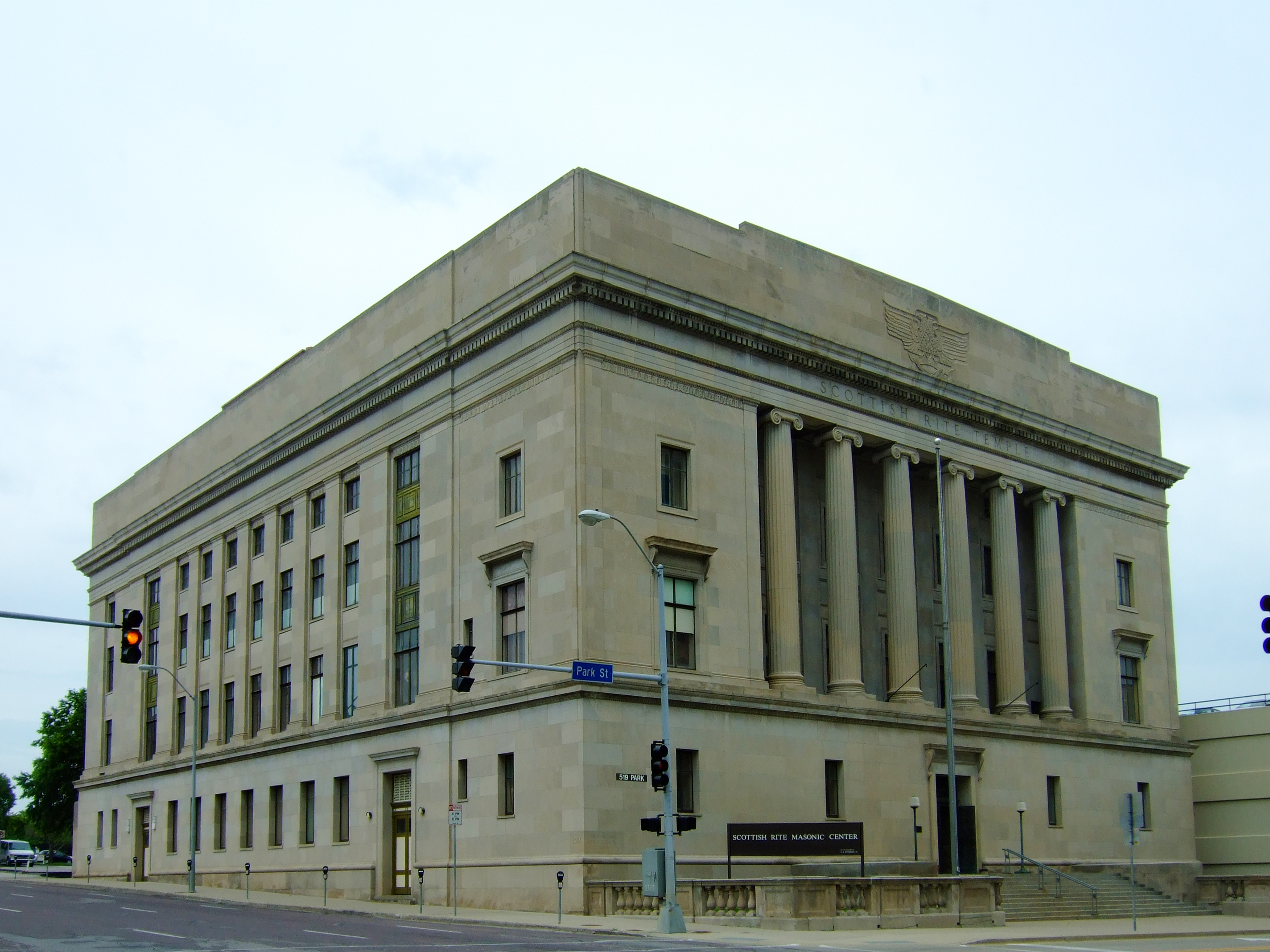

- Location within Iowa Location within the United States
- Location: 6th Ave. and Park St. Des Moines, Iowa
- Coordinates: 41°35′27.3″N 93°37′31″W
- Area: less than one acre
- Built: 1926-27
- Architect: Roland Harrison
- Architectural style: Neo-Classical
- NRHP reference No.: 83000399
- Added to NRHP: September 29, 1983

The Scottish Rite Consistory Building in Des Moines, Iowa was built during 1926–1927. It is a late date example of Neo-Classical style architecture, designed by Roland Harrison, a partner in the Des Moines architectural firm of Wetherell and Harrison.

The building is owned by the Scottish Rite and mainly used by the Scottish Rite and other Masonic organizations but is also used as a venue for weddings and other events. In recent years the building has seen renovation in the banquet hall and the lower floor of the auditorium had it carpet and chairs replaced.

It was listed on the National Register of Historic Places in 1983.

The building is located on a corner and presents stone-veneered "public" facades on the south and west sides, with short wrap-around extensions of the veneer on the north and east sides. It is 117 feet (36 m) by 164 feet (50 m) in plan and 80 feet (24 m) tall.
