= Homestead Building =

- U.S. National Register of Historic Places
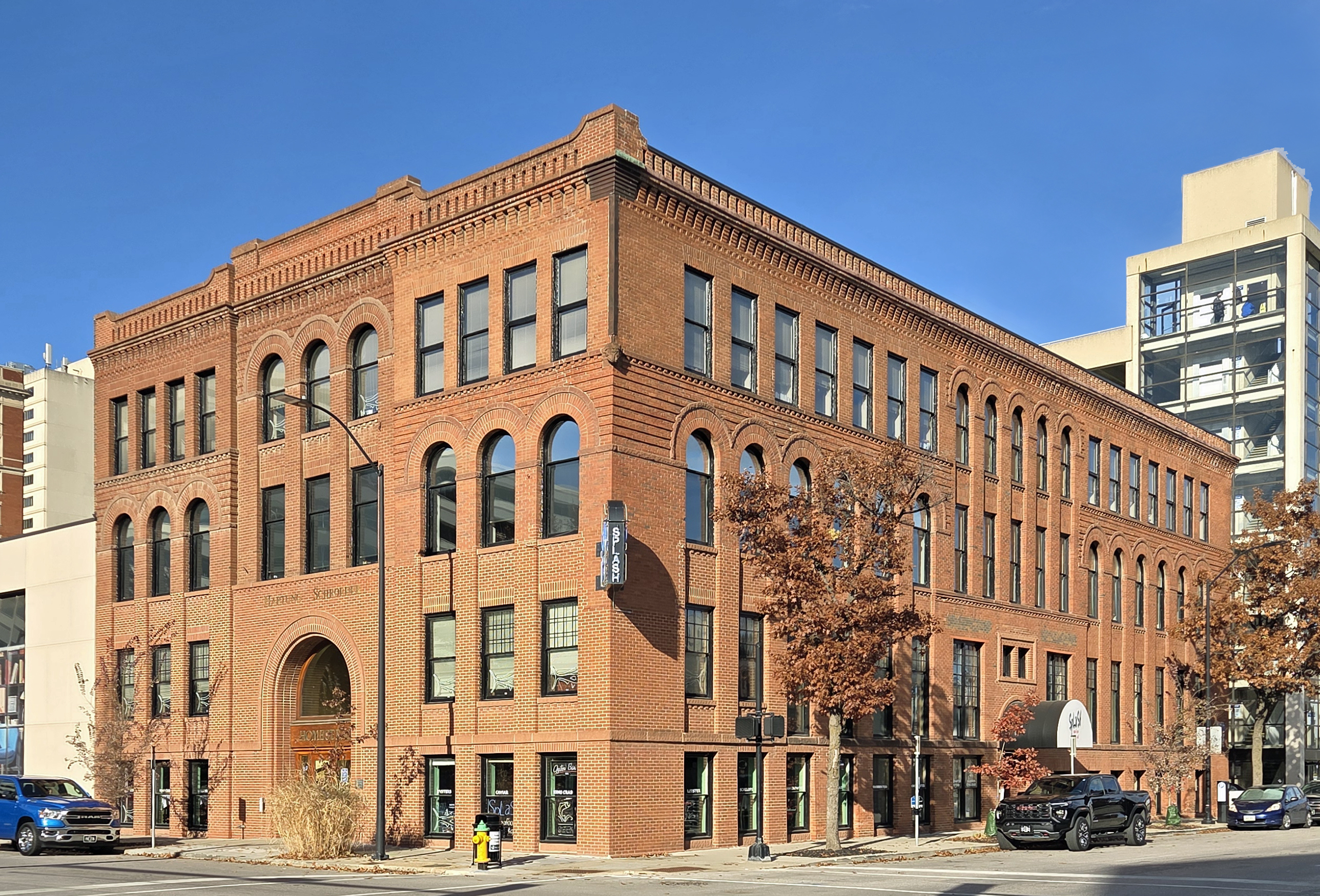
- The Homestead Building viewed from the east

- Location within Iowa Location within the United States
- Location: 209 4th Street, Des Moines, Iowa
- Coordinates: 41°35′15.7″N 93°37′17.7″W
- Area: less than one acre
- Built: 1893, 1905
- Architect: Smith & Gage
- Architectural style: Romanesque Revival
- NRHP reference No.: 82002635
- Added to NRHP: March 5, 1982

The Homestead Building, also known as the Martin Hotel, is a historic building in Des Moines, Iowa, United States. Designed by the Des Moines architectural firm of Smith & Gage, it was built in two stages. The eastern one-third was completed in 1893 and the western two-thirds were completed in 1905. It is one of a few late-19th-century commercial/industrial buildings that remain in the downtown area. The building was built for James M. Pierce for his publishing operation, which included the Iowa Homestead, a pioneer publication of modern agricultural journalism. Prior to Pierce, the Iowa Homestead publisher was Henry Wallace, the father of Agriculture Secretary Henry C. Wallace, and grandfather of U.S. Vice President Henry A. Wallace. "Through the efforts of Pierce and Wallace the Iowa Homestead became known for its promotion of the rotation of crops, the use of better seed, the value of more and better livestock, the importance of an attractive home and a good home life, the value of farmers banding together to protect common interests, and the care of the soil and conservation of its resources."

The four-story brick commercial block has strong Richardsonian Romanesque qualities. The east and south elevations have hard, face brick in two shades of red given the two construction dates. The north and west elevations have common brick. Each series of arched windows on the third floor is accented with corbeled bands of brick and capped with a dentate cornice. There is also dentate cornice and parapet wall at the top of the east and south elevations, and a flat roof that caps the building. It was converted into a hotel in 1916, and two storefronts were added either in the 1940s or the 1950s. The original arched entrance on the east elevation was also removed. The storefronts have subsequently been removed, and the building now houses offices. It was listed on the National Register of Historic Places in 1982.
