= Lincoln School (Oskaloosa, Iowa) =

- U.S. National Register of Historic Places
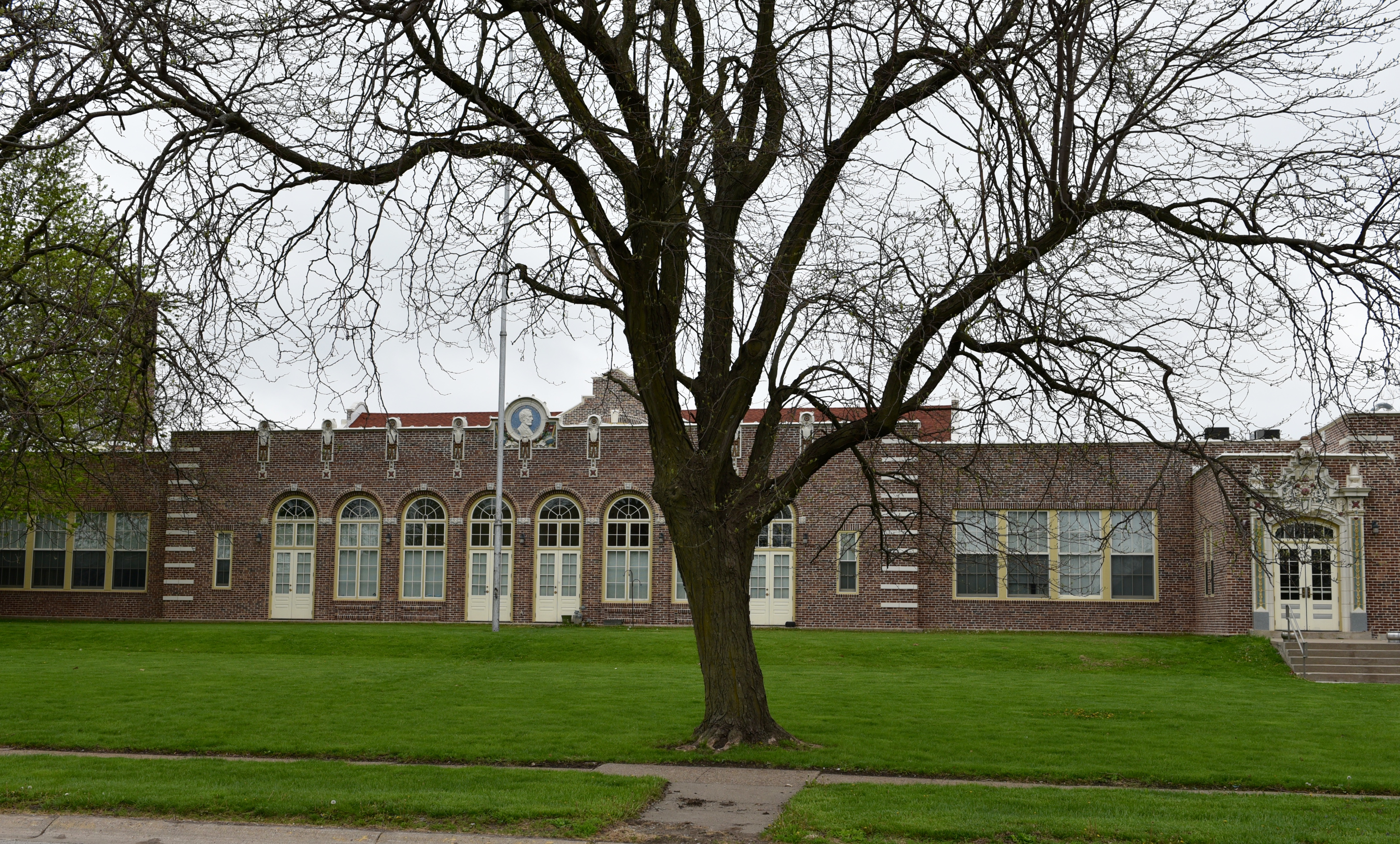

- Location within Iowa Location within the United States
- Location: 911 B Ave. W. Oskaloosa, Iowa
- Coordinates: 41°17′51″N 92°39′17″W
- Area: 2.4 acres (0.97 ha)
- Built: 1921
- Architect: Frank E. Wetherell
- Architectural style: Late 19th and 20th Century Revivals
- MPS: Oskaloosa MPS
- NRHP reference No.: 91001766
- Added to NRHP: December 13, 1991

Lincoln School is a historic building located in Oskaloosa, Iowa, United States. Built in 1921, it is a late design of Iowa architect Frank E. Wetherell. It is believed to be the first modern, single-story school building in the state. Decorative elements in terracotta are liberally used on the exterior. The interior follows an open plan that maximized the use of light and air into each classroom. The gymnasium, manual training, and domestic science areas were rather new concepts for elementary schools when the building was built. It was listed on the National Register of Historic Places in 1991.
