= Cherokee Public Library =

Library in Cherokee, Iowa, United States

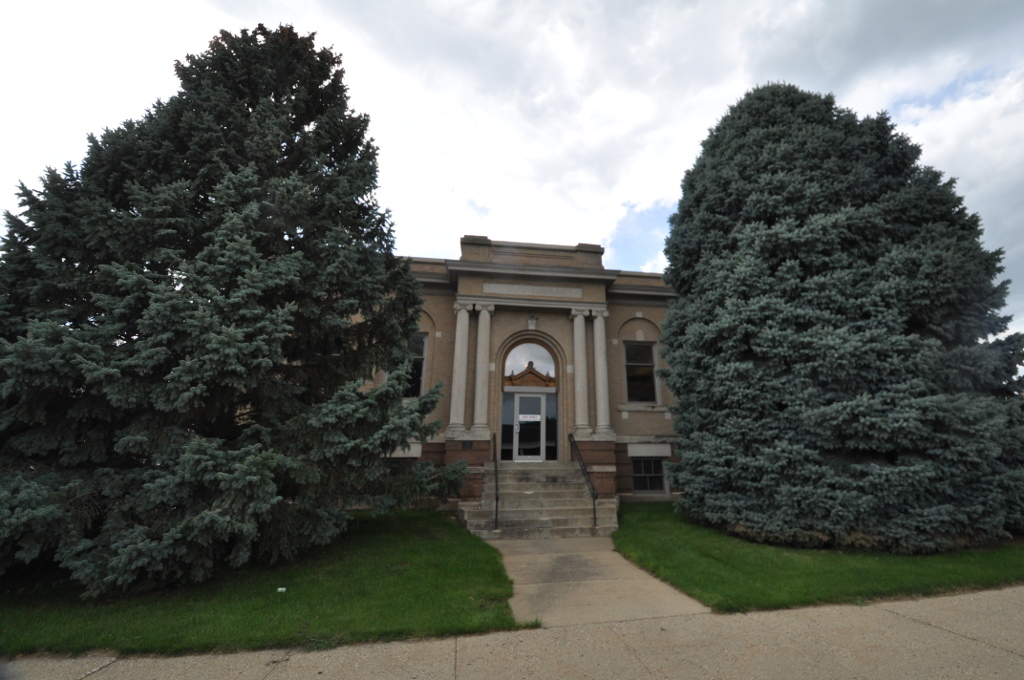
- Location: 215 S. 2nd St. Cherokee, Iowa, United States
- Type: Public
- Established: 1913

Other information
- Director: Mary Jo Ruppert
- Website: www.cherokee.lib.ia.us
- Cherokee Public Library
- U.S. National Register of Historic Places
- Location within Iowa Location within the United States
- Coordinates: 42°44′55″N 95°33′4″W
- Area: less than one acre
- Built: 1905
- Built by: Hansen and Lambkin
- Architect: F.E. Wetherell
- MPS: Public Library Buildings in Iowa TR
- NRHP reference No.: 85000773
- Added to NRHP: April 9, 1985

The Cherokee Public Library is located in Cherokee, Iowa, United States. A library was begun in town in 1886 by the Cherokee Ladies Library Association. The collection of books was housed in the YMCA and other shared facilities. It was poorly funded, and the city of Cherokee took over the library in 1898 after voters passed a referendum. The Carnegie Corporation of New York had accepted the city's application for a grant for $10,000 on January 6, 1903. They hired Oskaloosa, Iowa architect Frank E. Wetherell to design the new building, which was built by Hansen and Lambkin of New Hampton, Iowa. Carnegie donated a further $2,000 to complete construction. It was dedicated on May 2, 1905.

The skylight began to leak and was removed in 1910. The basement interior was completed in 1913. Vines grew across the exterior and were removed in the 1950s. Around the same time a new front entry was installed and interior renovations were made. Further renovations were completed in the 1980s, which included an elevator and handicap access. The building was listed on the National Register of Historic Places in 1985.
