= Oskaloosa City Square Commercial Historic District =

Historic district in Iowa, United States

- U.S. National Register of Historic Places
- U.S. Historic district
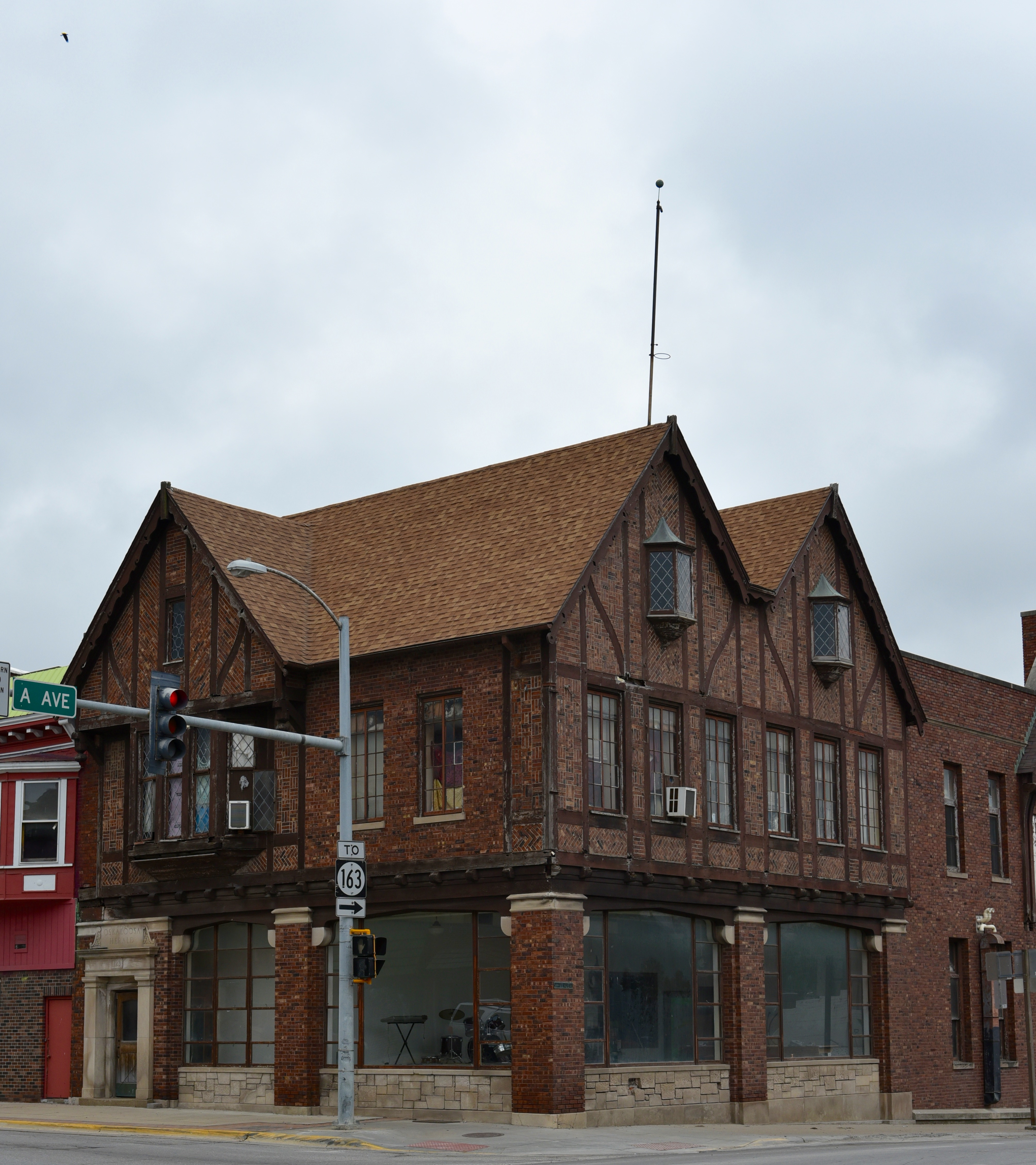

- Location within Iowa Location within the United States
- Interactive map showing the location for Oskaloosa City Square Commercial Historic District
- Location: Roughly bounded by A Ave. E, N. and S. Second St., Second Ave. E, and N. and S. A St., Oskaloosa, Iowa
- Coordinates: 41.295077°N 92.643495°W
- Area: 9.8 acres (4.0 ha)
- Built: 1885
- Architect: Multiple
- Architectural style: Early Commercial, Italianate, Romanesque
- NRHP reference No.: 86000716
- Added to NRHP: April 10, 1986

The Oskaloosa City Square Commercial Historic District is a 9.8-acre (4.0 ha) historic district in Oskaloosa, Iowa that includes Early Commercial, Italianate, and Romanesque Revival architecture. It was listed on the National Register of Historic Places in 1986. At the time of its nomination it included 68 contributing buildings.

The district includes the Mahaska County Courthouse, Oskaloosa City Park and Band Stand, Oskaloosa Fire Station and the Oskaloosa City Hall which are separately listed on the National Register.
