= Comet Morehouse =

Hyperbolic comet

C/1908 R1 (Morehouse)
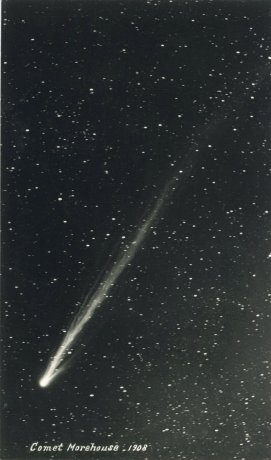
- Comet Morehouse depicted from a 1908 postcard.

Discovery
- Discovered by: Daniel W. Morehouse
- Discovery site: Yerkes Observatory
- Discovery date: 1 September 1908

Designations
- Alternative designations: 1908 III, 1908c

Orbital characteristics
- Epoch: 30 October 1908 (JD 2418244.5)
- Observation arc: 88 days
- Number of observations: 137
- Perihelion: 0.945 AU
- Semi-major axis: –1,058.049 AU
- Eccentricity: 1.00089
- Inclination: 140.174°
- Longitude of ascending node: 104.459°
- Argument of periapsis: 171.584°
- Last perihelion: 26 December 1908
- Earth MOID: 0.0668 AU
- Jupiter MOID: 2.3183 AU

Physical characteristics
- Mean radius: 2.33 km (1.45 mi) (Note: Calculated mean radius using the formula: $\log_{10}\,(\,R\,)\ =\;0.9 +\;0.13 (\,H\,)$ Where $\,H\,$ is the comet's absolute total magnitude (M1))
- Comet total magnitude (M1): 4.1

Comet Morehouse (modern formal designation: C/1908 R1) was a bright, non-periodic comet discovered by US astronomer Daniel Walter Morehouse on September 1, 1908 (the discovery photograph was taken on September 1, but the comet was not noticed until the following day), at Yerkes Observatory in Williams Bay, Wisconsin. Morehouse was a graduate student at the time. It was unusual in the rapid variations seen in the structure of its tail. At times, the tail seemed to split into up to six separate tails; at others, the tail appeared completely detached from the head of the comet. The tail was further unusual in that it formed while the comet was still 2 AU away from the Sun (where distances of 1.5 AU are more usual), and that there was a high concentration of the CO^{+} ion in its spectrum.

== Orbit ==
As is typical for comets fresh from the Oort Cloud, its orbital solution is more or less parabolic; if its orbit is in fact closed, it will likely not return for millions of years.
