= Eagle Grove Public Library =

- U.S. National Register of Historic Places
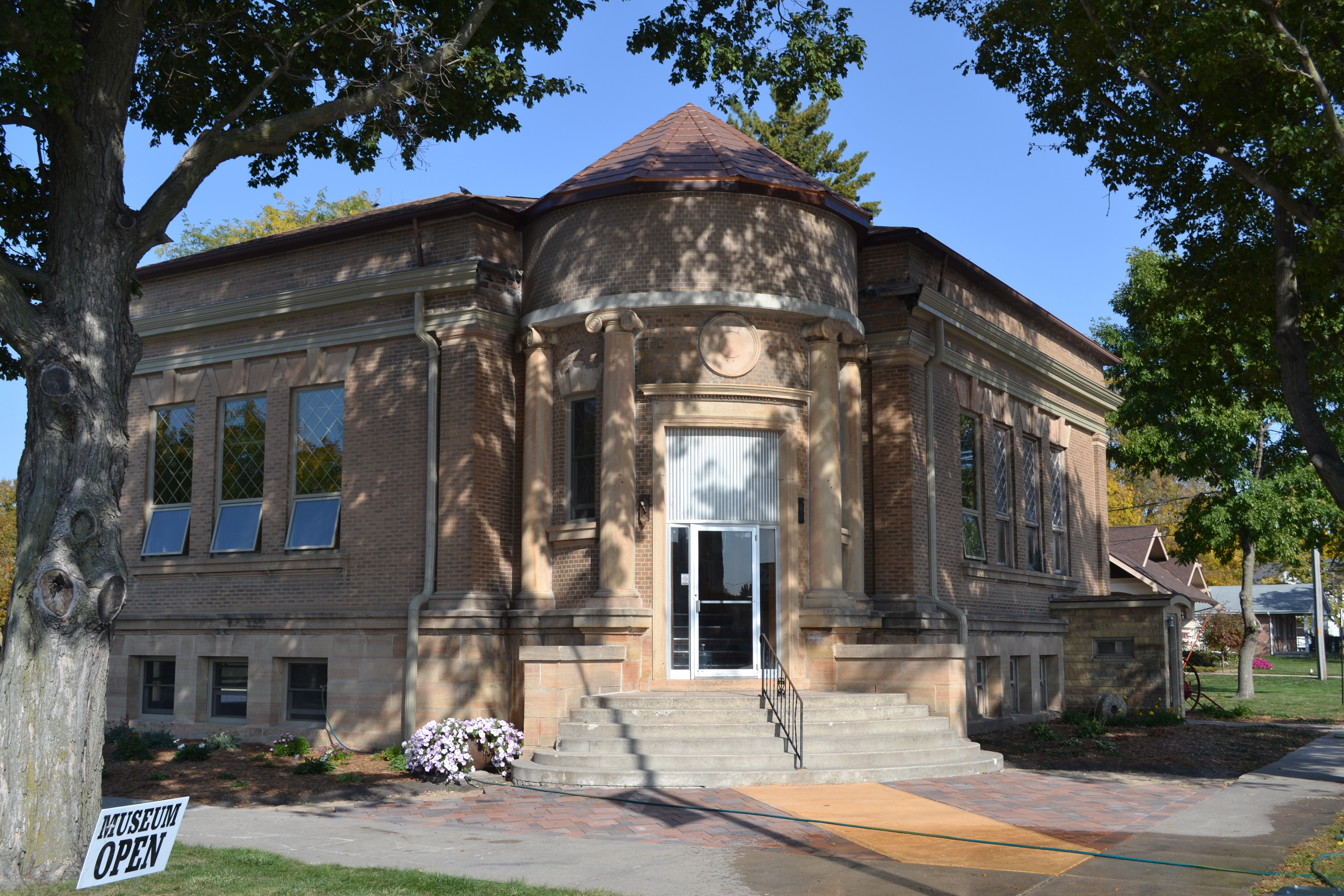

- Location within Iowa Location within the United States
- Location: 401 W. Broadway; Eagle Grove, Iowa
- Coordinates: 42°39′52″N 93°54′22″W
- Area: less than one acre
- Built: 1903
- Architect: Smith & Gage
- Architectural style: Beaux Arts
- NRHP reference No.: 77000569
- Added to NRHP: November 22, 1977

The Eagle Grove Public Library, now the Eagle Grove Historical Museum, is a historical building in Eagle Grove, Iowa, United States. A subscription library was begun in Eagle Grove around 1885, and housed in the post office. The impetus for the first free public library was a 1901 advertising campaign by a Des Moines insurance and investment company. When local citizens bought company's bonds, the company donated 250 books to the town. The books were housed in the Masonic Hall. The Carnegie Corporation of New York accepted Eagle Grove's application for a grant for $10,000 to build a library building on April 26, 1902. It was designed by the Des Moines architectural firm Smith & Gage in the Beaux Arts style. The library was dedicated on September 15, 1903. It is a brick structure with a conical-roofed entrance pavilion. Four engaged columns in the Ionic order flank the main entryway. The public library has subsequently moved to a larger facility, and the old library building was turned over to the local historical society for a museum. The building was listed on the National Register of Historic Places in 1983.
