= Daniel Walter Morehouse =

American astronomer

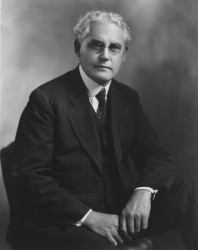
- Born: 22 February 1876; Mankato, Minnesota, US
- Died: January 21, 1941 (aged 64); Des Moines, Iowa, US
- Resting place: Drake Municipal Observatory
- Education: B.S. Drake University (1900) M.Sc. Drake University (1902); B.S. University of Chicago (1902) Ph.D. University of California (1914)
- Known for: Comet Morehouse Construction of Drake Municipal Observatory President of Drake University
- Spouse: Myrtle May (Slayton) Morehouse
- Children: 3
- Scientific career
- Thesis: On the Orbit of the Seventh Satellite of Jupiter (1914)

Daniel Walter Morehouse was an American astronomer, professor, and university president. He is best known for the discovery of Comet Morehouse and his academic and administrative work for Drake University.

Daniel Morehouse was born in a log cabin in Mankato Minnesota on February 22, 1876, and received his early education in Grant County, South Dakota. At age 19 he attended Northwestern Christian College in Excelsior, Minnesota. That school burned down in 1896, after which Morehouse transferred to Drake University in 1897. He graduated from Drake in 1900, with a Bachelor of Science degree. Shortly thereafter he began teaching at Drake and in 1902 he was appointed professor of Physics and Astronomy. During summers, he continued his studies at the University of Chicago in 1902 and in 1911–1912 at the University of California (Berkeley), from which he earned his PhD in 1914.

Dr. Morehouse discovered the comet that bears his name at the Yerkes Observatory, on September 1, 1908. For this discovery Morehouse received the Donohue Comet Medal from the Astronomical Society of the Pacific.

From 1921 through 1922 Dr. Morehouse supervised the construction of the Drake Municipal Observatory, which has been used for public lectures and telescopic observations for over 100 years.

In 1930 Morehouse was elected chairman of the astronomical division of The American Association for the Advancement of Science.

In 1919 he became the Dean of Men at Drake university, and became the dean of its College of Liberal Arts in 1922. He was president of Drake from 1923 until his death in 1941.

The ashes of Dr. Morehouse, and those of his wife Myrtle, are interred within the wall of the Drake Municipal Observatory rotunda.
