= Bedford Public Library =

Historic building in Iowa, United States

- U.S. National Register of Historic Places
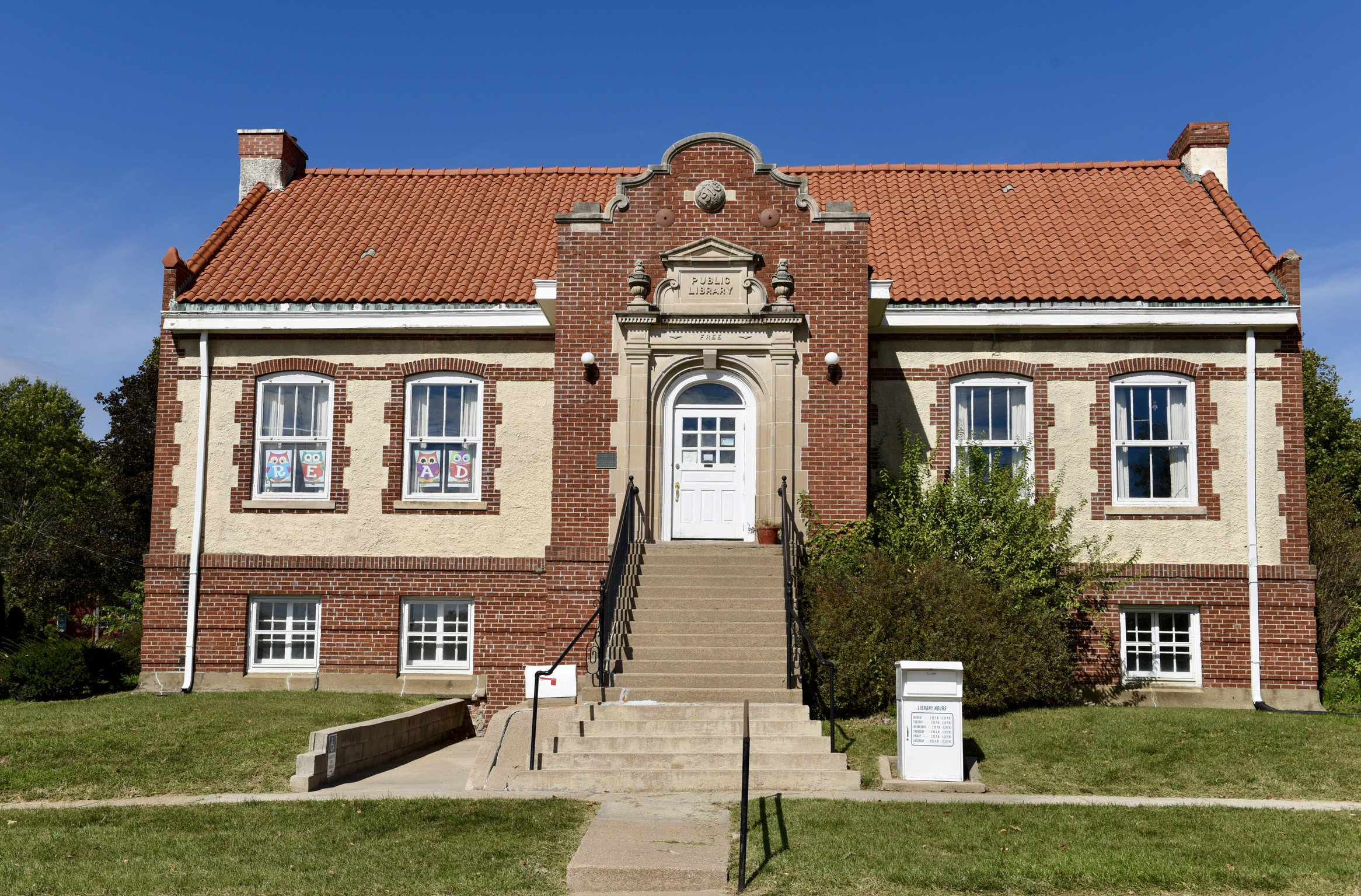

- Location within Iowa Location within the United States
- Location: Jefferson St. Bedford, Iowa
- Coordinates: 40°40′6″N 94°43′13″W
- Area: less than one acre
- Built: 1916
- Architect: Wetherell & Gage
- Architectural style: Colonial Revival; Renaissance Revival
- MPS: Public Library Buildings in Iowa TR
- NRHP reference No.: 83000405
- Added to NRHP: May 23, 1983

The Bedford Public Library in Bedford, Iowa, was built in 1916. It was designed by Wetherell & Gage with Colonial Revival and Renaissance Revival features. The Carnegie Corporation of New York had accepted Bedford's application for a grant for $10,000 on April 8, 1907. The library is a brick, side gable structure with a projecting entrance on the long side of the building. It was listed on the National Register of Historic Places in 1983.
