= Sioux Theatre =

- U.S. National Register of Historic Places
- Location within Iowa Location within the United States
- Location: 218 Main St. Sioux Rapids, Iowa
- Coordinates: 42°53′36″N 95°08′57″W
- Built: 1946
- Built by: C.I. Hersom Construction
- Architect: Wetherell & Harrison
- Architectural style: Moderne
- MPS: Movie Theaters of Iowa MPS
- NRHP reference No.: 12000030
- Added to NRHP: February 21, 2012

The Sioux Theatre is located in Sioux Rapids, Iowa, United States. The 375 seat movie theater was designed in the Moderne style by the Des Moines architectural firm Wetherell & Harrison. It was built by C.I. Hersom Construction. Initially owned by Don and Edna Gram, it opened in September 1946. Two Strong Lume-X projectors were added in 1974 when the theater was owned by Michael Berger. The Sioux Rapids Historical Association acquired the building and turned it into a museum. It was listed on the National Register of Historic Places in 2012.
