= Phil Hoffman House =

Historic house in Iowa, United States

- U.S. National Register of Historic Places
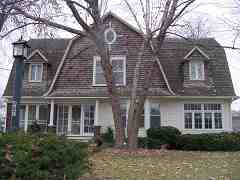
- Front of the house

- Location within Iowa Location within the United States
- Location: Oskaloosa, Iowa
- Coordinates: 41°17′44.03″N 92°38′8.6″W
- Area: less than one acre
- Built: 1906
- Architect: Frank E. Wetherell
- Architectural style: Dutch Colonial, Shingle Style with Crossed Gables
- MPS: Oskaloosa MPS
- NRHP reference No.: 91001760
- Added to NRHP: December 13, 1991

The Phil Hoffman House is a house at 807 High Avenue East in Oskaloosa, Iowa. It was added to the National Register of Historic Places in 1991.

It was originally built in 1920 by Phil Hoffman, publisher of The Oskaloosa Herald. The architect was Frank E. Wetherell, who designed several other notable structures in and around Oskaloosa, including the bandstand located in the center of the town square. Wetherell was prominent statewide as an architect known for public buildings, residences, and urban planning. At least 44 extant properties in Oskaloosa are attributed to Wetherell.
