= Frank E. Wetherell =

American architect (1869–1961)

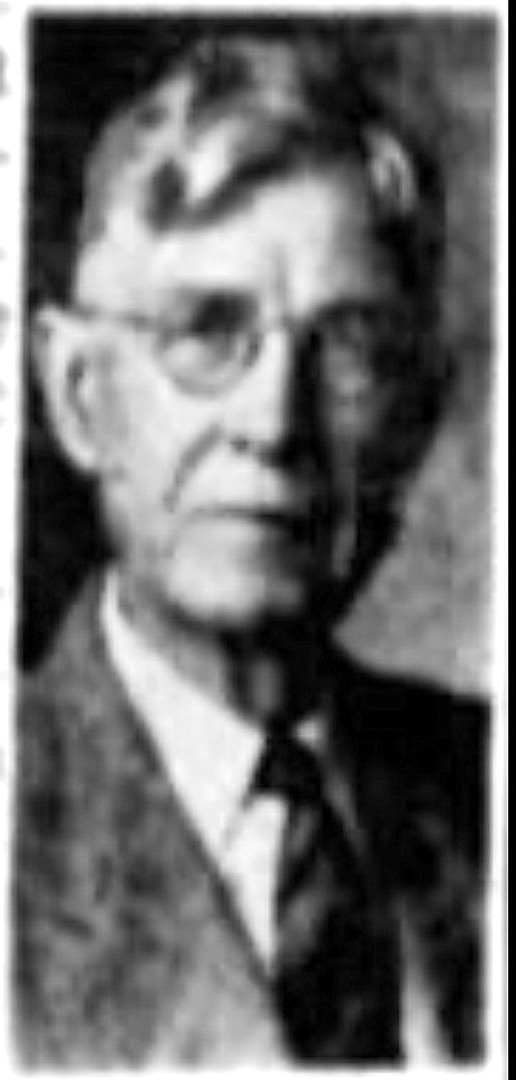
Frank E. Wetherell, American Architect (1869-1961)

Frank E. Wetherell (1869 in Malta, Ohio – 1961 in Des Moines, Iowa) was an American architect in the Midwest U.S. state of Iowa who was active from 1892 to 1931. Frank Wetherell was educated in the Oskaloosa, Iowa schools, and went on to Iowa City where he first studied civil engineering at the State University of Iowa, then changed to the field of architecture. It appears that he began his professional career in Oskaloosa in 1892, at the age of twenty-two. Following his marriage in 1894 to Amy Loosley, the couple moved to Peoria, Illinois, where Frank practiced for four years there before returning to Oskaloosa. The earliest architectural Frank Wetherell commission known in Oskaloosa is the renovation of the N.B. Weeks residence at 407 A Avenue East in 1894. Frank Wetherell founded the second oldest architectural firm in the state in Des Moines, Iowa, in 1905. He worked with Roland Harrison (born in 1889, age 95 in 1983) in partnership Wetherell & Harrison. The firm designed numerous Masonic buildings.

Wetherell frequently collaborated with Oliver O. Smith. With the addition of Alvah J. Gage, the firm became Smith, Wetherell & Gage. and later Smith & Gage. Wetherell was prominent statewide as an architect known for public buildings, residences, and urban planning. At least 44 extant properties in Oskaloosa, Iowa are attributed to him.

He was a parishioner of St. James Episcopal Church (Oskaloosa, Iowa), which he designed in Gothic Revival architecture style.

== Notable works ==
Many of Wetherell's and the firms' works as well as works of his partners are listed on the U.S. National Register of Historic Places (NRHP).

Works include:

- Alden Public Library, 1012 Water St. Alden, IA (Wetherell & Gage), NRHP-listed
- Appanoose County Courthouse, Van Buren and N. 12th St. Centerville, IA (Smith & Gage), NRHP-listed
- Bedford Public Library, Jefferson St. Bedford, IA (Wetherell & Gage), NRHP-listed
- Bloomfield Public Library, 107 N. Columbia Bloomfield, IA (Wetherell & Gage), NRHP-listed
- Burns United Methodist Church, 811 Crocker St. Des Moines, IA (Wetherell & Gage), NRHP-listed
- Cherokee Public Library, 215 S. 2nd St. Cherokee, IA (Wetherell, F.E.), NRHP-listed
- Decatur County Courthouse, 9th St. Leon, IA (Smith, Wetherell and Gage), NRHP-listed
- Drake Municipal Observatory, Waveland Park, Des Moines, IA
- Eagle Grove Public Library, 401 W. Broadway Eagle Grove, IA (Smith & Gage), NRHP-listed
- Eldon Carnegie Public Library, 608 W. Elm St. Eldon, IA (Wetherell and Gage), NRHP-listed
- Forest Cemetery Entrance, Jct. of N. 9th St. and J Ave. E. Oskaloosa, IA (Wetherell, Frank E.), NRHP-listed
- E. H. Gibbs House, William Penn College Campus, N. Market Extension Oskaloosa, IA (Wetherell, Frank E.), NRHP-listed
- Phil Hoffman House, 807 High Ave. E. Oskaloosa, IA (Wetherell, Frank E.), NRHP-listed
- Homestead Building, 303 Locust St. Des Moines, IA (Smith & Gage), NRHP-listed
- Keokuk County Courthouse, Main St. Sigourney, IA (Wetherell & Gage), NRHP-listed
- Laurens Carnegie Free Library, 263 N. 3rd St. Laurens, IA (Wetherell & Gage), NRHP-listed
- Lincoln School, 911 B Ave. W. Oskaloosa, IA (Wetherell, Frank E.), NRHP-listed
- Malek Theatre, 116 2nd Ave. NE. Independence, IA (Wetherell & Harrison), NRHP-listed
- Oskaloosa City Hall, jct. of S. Market St. and 2nd Ave. E., NE corner Oskaloosa, IA (Wetherell, Frank E.), NRHP-listed
- Oskaloosa City Park and Band Stand, City Park Oskaloosa, IA (Wetherell, Frank E.), NRHP-listed
- Oskaloosa Fire Station, 109-111 2nd Ave. E. Oskaloosa, IA (Wetherell, Frank E.), NRHP-listed
- Oskaloosa Public Library, Southwestern corner of the junction of Market St. and 2nd Ave. Oskaloosa, IA (Wetherell, Frank E.), NRHP-listed
- Seeberger-Loring-Kilburn House, 509 High Ave., E. Oskaloosa, IA (Wetherell, Frank E.), NRHP-listed
- C.F. and Mary Singmaster House, 32263 190th St. Keota, IA (Wetherell of Oskaloosa), NRHP-listed
- St. James Episcopal Church, jct. of 1st Ave. and S. 3rd St., SW corner Oskaloosa, IA (Wetherell, Frank E.), NRHP-listed
- Sioux Theatre, 218 Main St. Sioux Rapids, Iowa (Wetherell & Harrison), NRHP-listed
- The Capitol Theater, 211 N. Third St. Burlington, IA (Wetherall & Harrison), NRHP-listed
- Thomas I. Stoner House, 1030 56th St. Des Moines, IA (Wetherell & Harrison), NRHP-listed
- Scottish Rite Consistory Building (Des Moines, Iowa), 6th Ave. and Park St., Des Moines, Iowa (Roland Harrison), NRHP-listed
- One or more works in Courthouse Square Historic District, Roughly bounded by Van Buren, Haynes, Maple, and 10th Sts. Centerville, IA (Smith & Gage), NRHP-listed
- One or more works in Drake University Campus Historic District, roughly two blocks along University Ave. near Twenty-fifth St. Des Moines, IA (Smith & Gage), NRHP-listed
- One or more works in Highland Park Historic Business District at Euclid and Sixth Avenues, roughly jct. of Euclis Ave. and Sixth Ave. Des Moines, IA (Wetherell & Gage), NRHP-listed
- One or more works in the Grinnell Historic Commercial District, Roughly bounded by Main, Broad, and Commercial Sts. and 5th Ave., Grinnell, Iowa (F.E. Wetherell), NRHP-listed
- One or more works in Montezuma Downtown Historic District, Roughly along 3rd, 4th, Main & Liberty Sts. around courthouse square, Montezuma, IA (Frank E. Wetherell), NRHP-listed
- One or more works in Public Square Historic District, roughly around Keokuk County Court House Sigourney, IA (Wetherell and Gage), NRHP-listed
- One or more buildings in the Washington and Elizabeth Miller Tract-Center-Soll Community Historic District, NRHP-listed
- One or more works in Winterset Courthouse Square Commercial Historic District, roughly bounded by Green & 2nd Sts., 2nd Ave. & alley S. of Court Ave. Winterset, IA (Wetherell and Gage), NRHP-listed

== Notable Residences ==
W.R. Lacey residence 418 1st Avenue East, Oskaloosa, IA 52577 (circa 1895)

Thomas Seevers residence 409 High Avenue East, Oskaloosa, IA 52577 (circa 1895)

612 A Avenue East, Oskaloosa, IA 52577 (circa 1895)

Rhea Oppenheimer residence 415 1st Avenue East, Oskaloosa, IA 52577 (1925)

D C Bradley Residence 519 Drake Avenue, Centerville IA 52544 (1909)

== See also ==
- Winslow & Wetherell
