= Oskaloosa City Park and Band Stand =

Historic district in Iowa, United States

- U.S. National Register of Historic Places
- U.S. Historic district
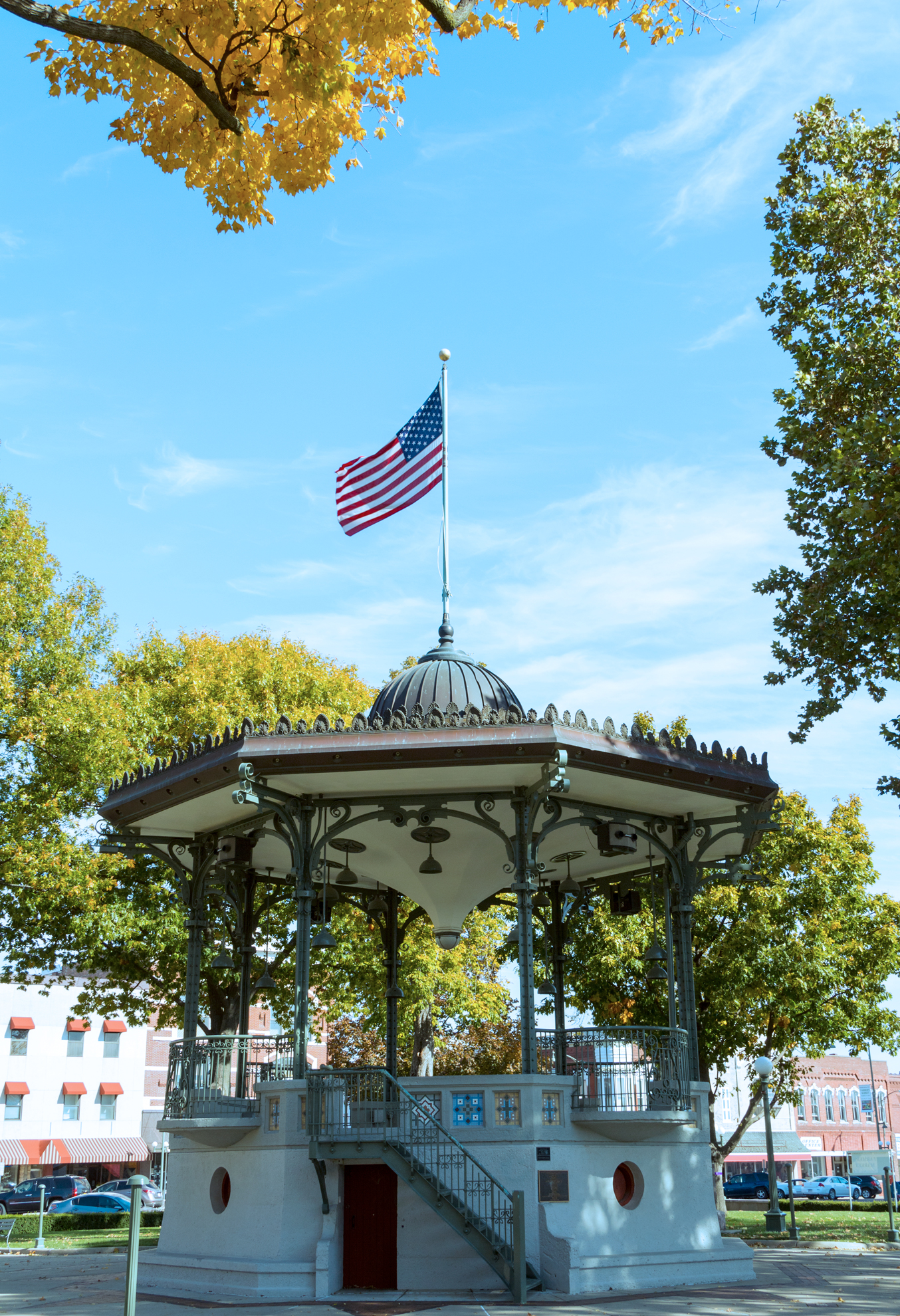

- Location within Iowa Location within the United States
- Location: City Park; Oskaloosa, Iowa
- Coordinates: 41°17′42″N 92°38′38″W
- Area: less than one acre
- Built: 1912 (bandstand)
- Architect: Frank E. Wetherell
- Architectural style: Mixed (more than two styles from different periods)
- NRHP reference No.: 83000389
- Added to NRHP: July 28, 1983

The Oskaloosa City Park and Band Stand is a nationally recognized historic district located in Oskaloosa, Iowa, United States. It was listed on the National Register of Historic Places in 1983. The listing includes one contributing site and five contributing objects. The town square, which is the site, was part of the original town plat in 1844. Landscaping projects were undertaken in the 1860s, 1911 and 1970–1971. In addition to the landscaping the sidewalks and curbing were installed in 1911. The bandstand in the center was designed by Des Moines architect Frank E. Wetherell, an Oskaloosa native, and built in 1912. The 29-foot (8.8 m) high octagonal structure is composed of concrete, iron and steel.

In addition to the bandstand, the other historic objects include the Spanish–American War torpedo (c. 1900); Statue of Mahaska by Fry (1909); Gold Star Mothers' rose bed (c. 1920); and the Women's Relief Corps memorial (1920). It was included in the Oskaloosa City Square Commercial Historic District, which surrounds it, in 1986.
