= C.F. and Mary Singmaster House =

Historic house in Iowa, United States

- U.S. National Register of Historic Places
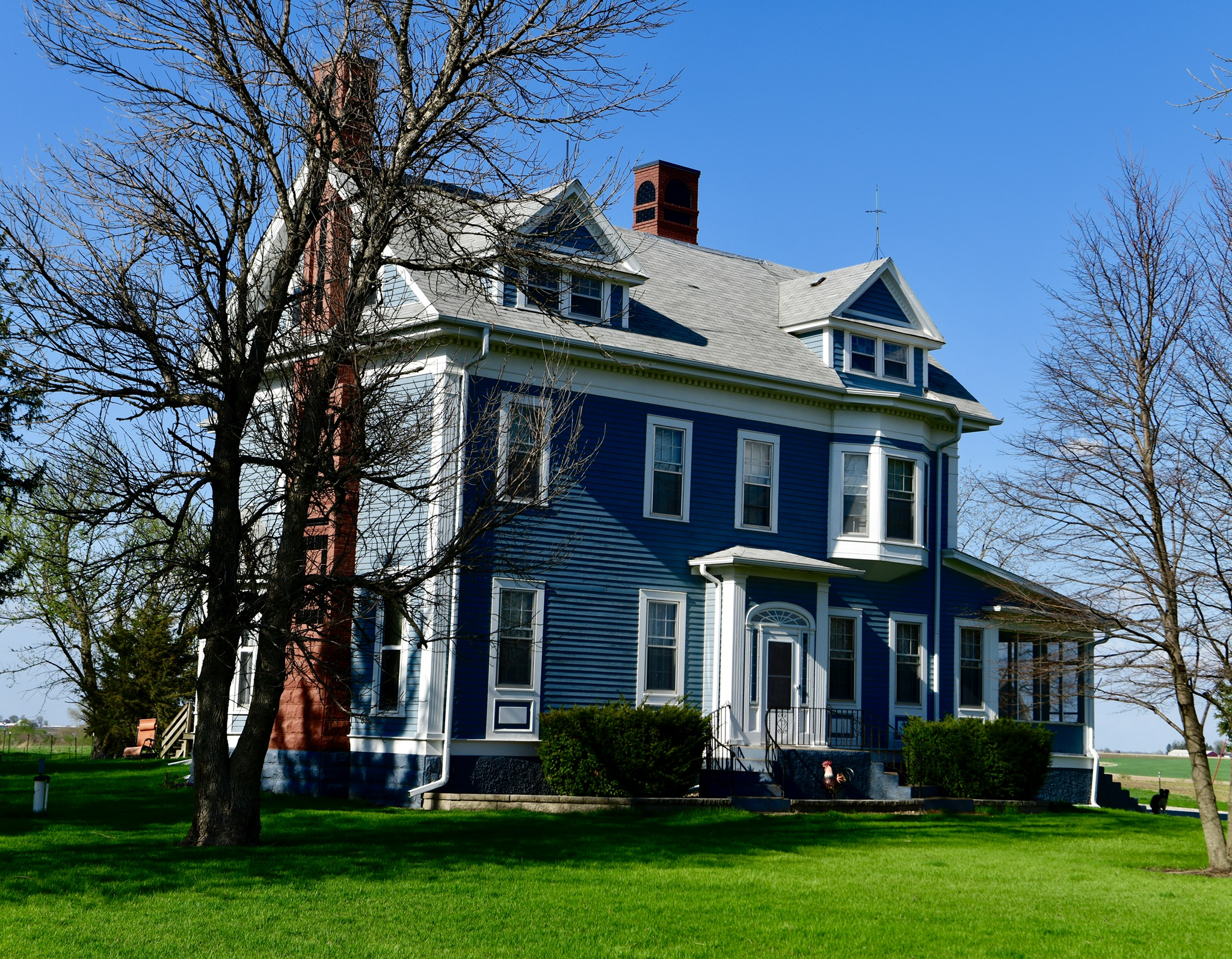

- Location within Iowa Location within the United States
- Location: 32263 190th St.
- Nearest city: Keota, Iowa
- Coordinates: 41°22′53″N 91°58′49″W
- Area: less than one acre
- Built: 1893
- Architect: Frank E. Wetherell
- Architectural style: Colonial Revival
- NRHP reference No.: 97001608
- Added to NRHP: January 16, 1998

The C.F. and Mary Singmaster House, also known as Maplehurst Ranch, or more simply Maplehurst, is located near Keota, Iowa, United States. C.F. Singmaster, a Pennsylvania native, moved to Keokuk County with his parents in 1843 and settled near Talleyrand, south of Keota. His father Samuel established the home farm, Singmaster Ranch. The family became known for the importation and breeding of draft horses. They also had large land holdings in Iowa and Nebraska where they also raised hogs and beef cattle, and were involved in local banks as well. Samuel Singmaster bought the Maplehurst property in 1864 to expand the family's operation. At one time Maplehurst Ranch included three mansions, several horse barns, out buildings, stables, and cottages for workers. There was also a boarding house for visitors and clients to stay.

C.F. Singmaster had this 2½ story Colonial Revival house built in 1893 on the site of an existing house. It was designed by Oskaloosa, Iowa architect Frank E. Wetherell. The 60-by-80-foot (18 by 24 m) residence follows an irregular plan. It is capped by a cross gabled roof that features two gabled dormers with pediments on the south elevation. It remained in the family until 1968 when it was sold to Dr. R.A. Carmichael who established the first bovine embryo transfer facility in the United States on the property. The house was listed on the National Register of Historic Places in 1998.
