= Malek Theatre =

- U.S. National Register of Historic Places
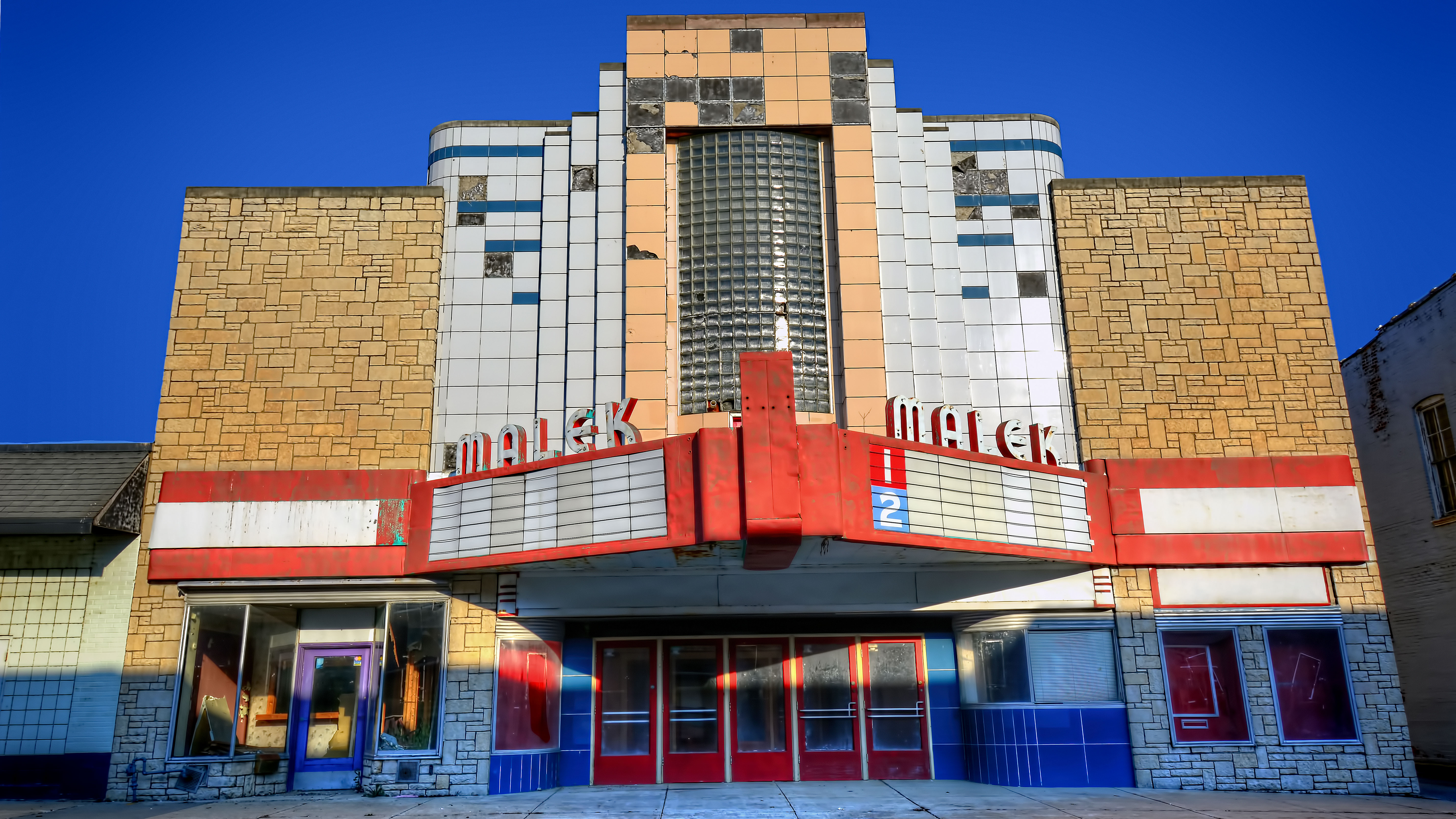

- Location within Iowa Location within the United States
- Location: 116 2nd Ave. NE., Independence, Iowa
- Coordinates: 42.4694°N 91.8932°W
- Area: less than one acre
- Built: 1947
- Architect: Wetherell & Harrison
- Architectural style: Art Deco
- NRHP reference No.: 09000329
- Added to NRHP: May 21, 2009

The Malek Theatre, also known as The Malek, is an Art Deco theatre in downtown Independence, Iowa that was built in 1947. It replaced the Grand Theatre, which had burned on March 3, 1945. It was designed by Wetherell & Harrison for Bob C. Malek and was intended to be fireproof. It has a steel truss roof. A stepped tower at the front is made with structural glass and glass blocks. As of 2009 the interior was mostly original, with Art Deco style light fixtures and coved ceilings. Artist Merle Reed, of California, hand-painted its interior designs in 1945.

In 1982 the theatre was split in two, and in 2002 the dividing wall was removed.

It was listed on the National Register of Historic Places in 2009.

The theatre was deemed historically significant "as an excellent example of an Art Deco style theater that has a high degree of integrity on the exterior and interior, designed by Des Moines architectural firm of Wetherell & Harrison." It is one of just two Art Deco buildings in Independence. The other is the Buchanan County Courthouse, which was built with Public Works Administration labor also in the 1930s. "The exterior of the theater exhibits characteristics of the Art Deco style including a central stepped tower, smooth finished surfaces of Glastone, and curved walls of Glastone and glass block. The interior has a high degree of integrity with Art Deco features such as curved walls, coved ceilings backlit with neon, bent neon fixtures, stylized floral motifs, and decorative metal light fixtures. The theater retains its integrity of design, workmanship, materials, feeling, association, location, and setting."

In 2009 many of the paintings had been restored or repainted. In 2009, plans included replacing a pair of tall columns that were on the sides of the stage, using blueprints obtained from Wetherell Ericsson Architects in Des Moines, Iowa.

The Malek theatre opened in 1946 on land previously occupied by The Grand theatre, which was located in the south part of the Hotel Gedney block built during the town's horse-racing heyday. The hotel block and its attached theater burned to the ground in 1945 and the theatre's owner, Bohumil "Bob" Malek, a well-regarded local businessman, decided to build a new venue and appropriately named it The Malek Theatre. The new theatre was the patron's dream for that era, containing two rooms for private viewings, each with doors and thick paned glass to eliminate sound in or out. One of these rooms was called "the crying room", designed for parents who didn't want their fussy child to interrupt the movie for other patrons.

The building measures 60 by 140 feet (18 m × 43 m) and is 42 feet high. The exterior is built of Lannon stone, vitreolite and glass block. It is 100% fireproof and is equipped with the latest equipment and fixtures (1946 quote). The theater cost $140,000 to build, and it took a year to complete.

In 1985, the then-managers decided that patronage could be improved if the theatre was split into a 300-seat twinned theatre instead of the original 862-seat undivided auditorium. Despite the investment, the newly-split theatre closed soon after.

As of January 2014, the theatre remained closed, its exterior slowly succumbing to petty vandalism and the inhospitable climate of northeast Iowa.
