= Oskaloosa Public Library =

- U.S. National Register of Historic Places
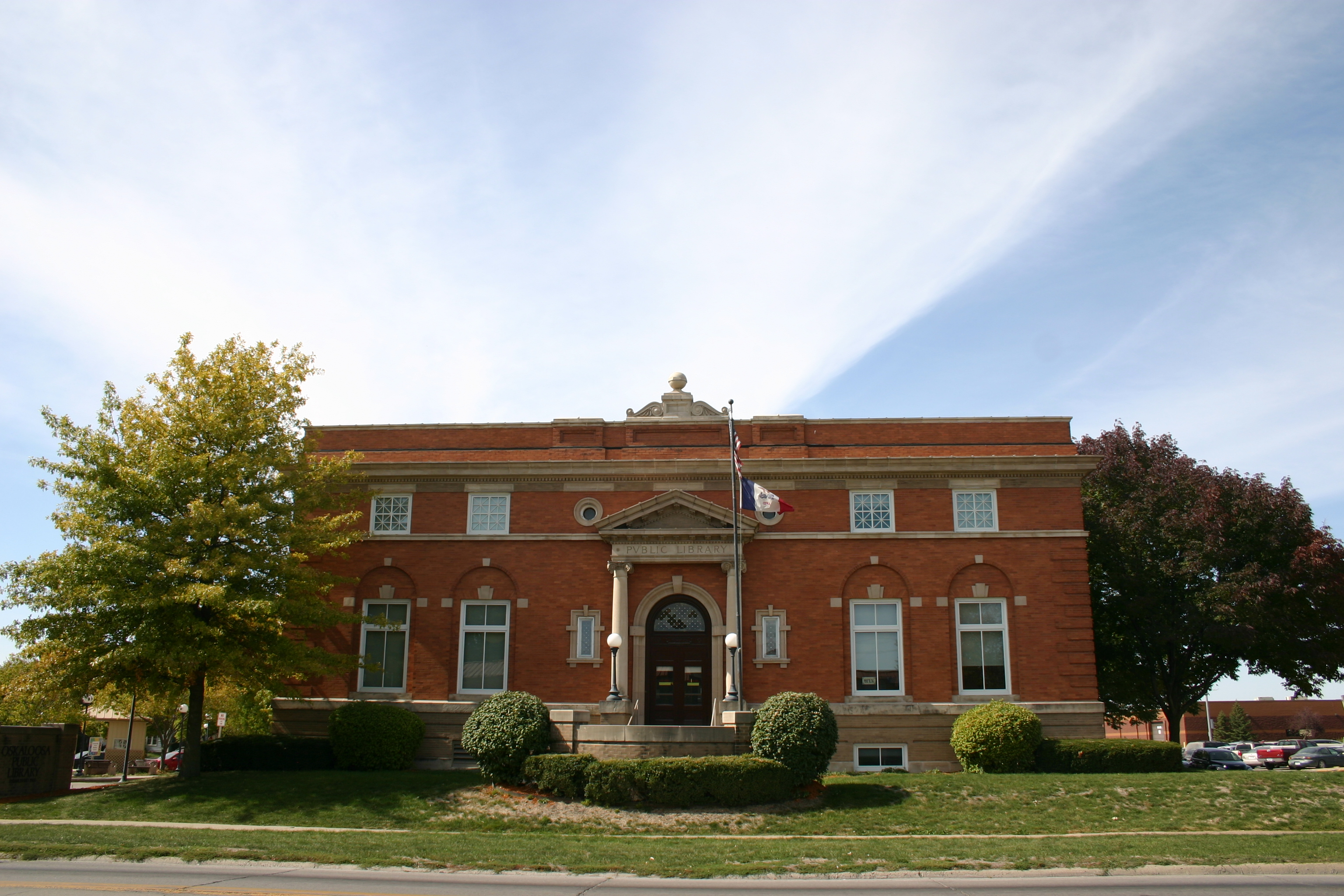

- Location within Iowa Location within the United States
- Location: Southwestern corner of the junction of Market St. and 2nd Ave. Oskaloosa, Iowa
- Coordinates: 41°17′36″N 92°38′44″W
- Area: less than one acre
- Built: 1903
- Built by: John Gier
- Architect: Frank E. Wetherell
- Architectural style: Classical Revival
- MPS: Oskaloosa MPS; Public Library Buildings in Iowa TR
- NRHP reference No.: 83004763
- Added to NRHP: December 13, 1991

Oskaloosa Public Library is a facility located in Oskaloosa, Iowa, United States. Construction of the library was launched in 1902 with a grant from the Carnegie Corporation of New York. The building was added to the National Register of Historic Places in 1991.

== History ==
=== Establishment ===
The community of Oskaloosa, county seat of the county seat of Mahaska County, Iowa, established a public library board shortly after the turn of the 20th Century and passed a local tax for operation of such a facility. Application was made to philanthropist Andrew Carnegie and the Carnegie Corporation for funds for building construction. The application for a grant for $22,000 was accepted on March 14, 1902. A centrally located site on South Market Street, measuring 120 feet square, was acquired for the facility in May.

The building was designed by Des Moines architect Frank E. Wetherell, an Oskaloosa native. It was the first major public commission he received. John Gier was the contractor.

The building is a two-story brick structure in the Neoclassical style built on a raised basement. The main entrance is surrounded by a classical portico. It was dedicated on September 7, 1903. The library was established with a collection of 5,000 volumes and its operation funded by a tax of one-tenth cent per dollar on all property in the city.

An additional grant of $2,000 was made by Carnegie in 1905, with proceeds used to finish the second story of the building. As a condition of this additional grant, the Oskaloosa City Council pledged to support the facility with a sum of at least $2,200 per year, ten percent of the two Carnegie capital grants. This pledge through city ordinance did not increase the cost to the town's taxpayers as more than $2,200 per year was already being spent on operation of the facility.

=== Historical registry ===
The building was listed on the National Register of Historic Places in 1991. A 1997 addition enlarged the facility.
