= National Register of Historic Places listings in Mahaska County, Iowa =

Location of Mahaska County in Iowa

This is a list of the National Register of Historic Places listings in Mahaska County, Iowa.

This is intended to be a complete list of the properties and districts on the National Register of Historic Places in Mahaska County, Iowa, United States. Latitude and longitude coordinates are provided for many National Register properties and districts; these locations may be seen together in a map.

There are 49 properties and districts listed on the National Register in the county.

This National Park Service list is complete through NPS recent listings posted May 1, 2026.

== Current listings ==
	Name on the Register	Image	Date listed	Location	City or town	Description
1	Carroll Alsop House	Carroll Alsop House	November 9, 1988 (#88002142)	1907 A Ave., E. 41°17′49″N 92°37′21″W	Oskaloosa	
2	Bellefountain Bridge	Bellefountain Bridge	May 15, 1998 (#98000506)	Ashland Ave. over the Des Moines River; 41°19′58″N 92°51′56″W	Tracy	
3	Dr. William E. and Ethel Rosenberger Berry House	Dr. William E. and Ethel Rosenberger Berry House	March 29, 1996 (#96000343)	116 Rosenberger Ave. 41°18′22″N 92°38′46″W	Oskaloosa	
4	Thomas J. Conover House	Thomas J. Conover House	March 28, 1996 (#96000342)	1010 N. Market St. 41°18′14″N 92°38′39″W	Oskaloosa	
5	Edmundson Park Historic District	Edmundson Park Historic District	September 27, 2007 (#07001005)	Junction of 11th Ave., W. and Edmundson Dr. 41°17′07″N 92°39′36″W	Oskaloosa	
6	Eveland Bridge	Eveland Bridge	May 15, 1998 (#98000504)	Fulton Ave. over the Des Moines River; 41°14′34″N 92°45′24″W	Oskaloosa	
7	Forest Cemetery Entrance	Forest Cemetery Entrance	December 13, 1991 (#91001765)	Junction of N. 9th St. and J Ave., E. 41°18′12″N 92°38′02″W	Oskaloosa	
8	E.H. Gibbs House		December 13, 1991 (#91001761)	William Penn University campus, N. Market Extension; 41°18′31″N 92°38′41″W	Oskaloosa	
9	Ulysses Simpson Grant Elementary School	Ulysses Simpson Grant Elementary School	December 10, 2008 (#08001163)	715 B Ave., E. 41°17′50″N 92°38′16″W	Oskaloosa	
10	Phil Hoffman House	Phil Hoffman House	December 13, 1991 (#91001760)	807 High Ave., E. 41°17′44″N 92°38′09″W	Oskaloosa	
11	Iowa Yearly Meeting House-College Avenue Friends Church	Iowa Yearly Meeting House-College Avenue Friends Church	March 29, 1996 (#96000344)	912 N. C St. 41°18′12″N 92°38′53″W	Oskaloosa	
12	William A. and Ida C. Johnson House	William A. and Ida C. Johnson House	March 28, 1996 (#96000346)	307 College Ave. 41°18′14″N 92°38′50″W	Oskaloosa	
13	Dr. William H. and Mae R. Klose House	Dr. William H. and Mae R. Klose House	March 29, 1996 (#96000350)	1002 Penn Boulevard; 41°18′23″N 92°38′51″W	Oskaloosa	
14	Lake Keomah State Park, Bathhouse-Lodge Area (Area A)		November 15, 1990 (#90001666)	Off Iowa Highway 371 south of its junction with Iowa Highway 92; 41°17′26″N 92°32′27″W	Oskaloosa	
15	Lake Keomah State Park, Erosion Control Area (Area B)		November 15, 1990 (#90001667)	Off Iowa Highway 371 south of its junction with Iowa Highway 92; 41°17′07″N 92°32′32″W	Oskaloosa	
16	Jack Lamberson House	Jack Lamberson House	November 9, 1988 (#88002146)	511 N. Park Ave. 41°18′01″N 92°37′37″W	Oskaloosa	
17	Lincoln School	Lincoln School	December 13, 1991 (#91001766)	911 B Ave., W. 41°17′51″N 92°39′17″W	Oskaloosa	
18	Mahaska County Courthouse	Mahaska County Courthouse	July 2, 1981 (#81000255)	Market St. and 2nd Ave. 41°17′42″N 92°38′35″W	Oskaloosa	
19	Maj. James W. McMullin House	Maj. James W. McMullin House	April 11, 1985 (#85000723)	403 1st Ave., E. 41°17′40″N 92°38′26″W	Oskaloosa	
20	W.A. McNeill House	W.A. McNeill House	October 21, 1999 (#99001267)	1282 C Ave., E. 41°17′54″N 92°37′36″W	Oskaloosa	
21	Daniel Nelson House and Barn	Daniel Nelson House and Barn	November 20, 1974 (#74000798)	2211 Nelson Lane; 41°19′14″N 92°37′50″W	Oskaloosa	
22	North Skunk River Bridge		May 15, 1998 (#98000503)	County Road G13 over the North Skunk River; 41°29′41″N 92°38′00″W	New Sharon	
23	Oskaloosa City Hall	Oskaloosa City Hall	December 13, 1991 (#91001764)	Northeastern corner of the junction of S. Market St. and 2nd Ave., E. 41°17′37″N 92°38′40″W	Oskaloosa	
24	Oskaloosa City Park and Band Stand	Oskaloosa City Park and Band Stand	July 28, 1983 (#83000389)	City Park; 41°17′42″N 92°38′38″W	Oskaloosa	
25	Oskaloosa City Square Commercial Historic District	Oskaloosa City Square Commercial Historic District	April 10, 1986 (#86000716)	Roughly bounded by A Ave., E, N. and S. 2nd St., 2nd Ave., E, and N. and S. A St. 41°17′48″N 92°38′39″W	Oskaloosa	
26	Oskaloosa Fire Station	Oskaloosa Fire Station	December 13, 1991 (#91001763)	109-111 2nd Ave., E. 41°17′37″N 92°38′39″W	Oskaloosa	
27	Oskaloosa Monthly Meeting of Friends Parsonage	Oskaloosa Monthly Meeting of Friends Parsonage	March 29, 1996 (#96000348)	910 N. C St. 41°18′10″N 92°38′53″W	Oskaloosa	
28	Oskaloosa Post Office		February 6, 2020 (#100004975)	206 North Market St. 41°17′47″N 92°38′42″W	Oskaloosa	
29	Oskaloosa Public Library	Oskaloosa Public Library	December 13, 1991 (#83004763)	Southwestern corner of the junction of Market St. and 2nd Ave. 41°17′35″N 92°38′42″W	Oskaloosa	
30	Paradise Block Historic District	Paradise Block Historic District	December 13, 1991 (#91001767)	402, 406, 408, 410, 414, 418, and 510-714 High Ave. E. 41°17′43″N 92°38′18″W	Oskaloosa	
31	Penn College Historic District	Penn College Historic District	April 4, 1996 (#96000391)	201 Trueblood Ave. 41°18′32″N 92°38′47″W	Oskaloosa	
32	Pierson-Betts House	Pierson-Betts House	March 28, 1996 (#96000347)	815 Penn Boulevard; 41°18′22″N 92°38′52″W	Oskaloosa	
33	President's Cottage	President's Cottage	March 28, 1996 (#96000340)	425 College Ave. 41°18′13″N 92°39′00″W	Oskaloosa	
34	Rock Island Passenger Depot	Rock Island Passenger Depot	October 30, 1989 (#89001780)	Rock Island Ave. between 1st and 2nd Sts. 41°17′21″N 92°38′34″W	Oskaloosa	
35	Chuck and Emily Russell House		January 29, 2025 (#100011414)	211 Hillcrest Drive; 41°17′51″N 92°37′32″W	Oskaloosa	
36	Rose Hill Methodist Episcopal Church	Rose Hill Methodist Episcopal Church	April 11, 2003 (#03000201)	304 Main St. 41°19′14″N 92°27′55″W	Rose Hill	
37	St. James Episcopal Church	St. James Episcopal Church	December 13, 1991 (#91001762)	Southwestern corner of the junction of 1st Ave. and S. 3rd St. 41°17′39″N 92°38′29″W	Oskaloosa	
38	Seeberger-Loring-Kilburn House	Seeberger-Loring-Kilburn House	July 14, 1983 (#83000390)	509 High Ave., E. 41°17′44″N 92°38′22″W	Oskaloosa	
39	John H. Shoemake House	John H. Shoemake House	March 22, 1984 (#84001276)	116 2nd Ave., W. 41°17′36″N 92°38′44″W	Oskaloosa	
40	Smith-Johnson House	Smith-Johnson House	November 9, 1977 (#77000538)	713 High Ave., E. 41°17′44″N 92°38′13″W	Oskaloosa	
41	Spring Creek Friends Cemetery		March 29, 1996 (#96000351)	Junction of Osburn Ave. and 235th St. 41°18′41″N 92°36′09″W	Oskaloosa	
42	Spring Creek Meeting House-H Street Mission		March 28, 1996 (#96000339)	207 N. H St. 41°17′47″N 92°39′17″W	Oskaloosa	
43	Spurgin Residence	Spurgin Residence	March 28, 1996 (#96000341)	313 College Ave. 41°18′14″N 92°39′00″W	Oskaloosa	
44	Stock Judging Pavilion	Stock Judging Pavilion	April 12, 1984 (#84001280)	Southern Iowa Fairgrounds; 41°18′04″N 92°39′43″W	Oskaloosa	
45	Dr. Ella Stokes House	Dr. Ella Stokes House	March 29, 1996 (#96000349)	416 W. College Hill Ave. 41°18′21″N 92°38′59″W	Oskaloosa	
46	Prof. Edgar H. and Irene D. Stranahan House	Prof. Edgar H. and Irene D. Stranahan House	March 28, 1996 (#96000345)	1001 Gurney St. 41°18′23″N 92°38′49″W	Oskaloosa	
47	Vander Wilt Farmstead Historic District	Vander Wilt Farmstead Historic District	January 8, 2004 (#03001370)	1345 Iowa Highway 163, Sec. 22, T26N, R17W, SW of NE; 41°22′22″N 92°48′11″W	Leighton	
48	Gary J. and Matilda Vermeer Farmstead		July 23, 2018 (#100002682)	1688 250th Ave. 41°24′35″N 92°52′16″W	Pella	
49	John K. Voorhees House	John K. Voorhees House	March 5, 1982 (#82002632)	Northwest of Oskaloosa on Iowa Highway 163; 41°23′09″N 92°49′22″W	Oskaloosa	

== Former listings ==
One property was formerly listed but has been removed:

	Name on the Register	Image	Date listed	Date removed	Location	City or town	Description
1	Bridge near New Sharon		May 15, 1998 (#98000505)	September 10, 2008	County Road G29 over drainage ditch	New Sharon vicinity	Bridge was replaced in 1994, four years before it was officially listed.

== See also ==
- List of National Historic Landmarks in Iowa
- National Register of Historic Places listings in Iowa
- Listings in neighboring counties: Jasper, Keokuk, Marion, Monroe, Poweshiek, Wapello
