= Stock Judging Pavilion =

Stock Judging Pavilion may refer to:

- Stock Judging Pavilion (Oskaloosa, Iowa), listed on the National Register of Historic Places in Mahaska County, Iowa
- Stock Judging Pavilion (Brookings, South Dakota), listed on the National Register of Historic Places in Brookings County, South Dakota
