= Grant School =

Grant School or Ulysses S. Grant School may refer to:

== Hong Kong ==
- Grant School (Hong Kong)

== United States ==
- Grant High School (disambiguation), several places
- Ulysses Simpson Grant Elementary School, a historic building in Oskaloosa, Iowa
- Grant School (St. Louis, Missouri), listed on the NRHP in St. Louis, Missouri
- Grant School (Zanesville, Ohio), listed on the NRHP in Muskingum County, Ohio
- Ulysses S. Grant School (Washington, D.C.), a historic high school in Washington, D.C.
