= School Without Walls (Washington, D.C.) =

High school in Washington, DC, US

Location
- 2130 G Street NW; Washington, D.C. 20037; United States; 38°53′53″N 77°02′53″W

Information
- School type: Public magnet high school
- Established: 1971 (55 years ago)
- Status: Open
- School board: District of Columbia State Board of Education
- School district: District of Columbia Public Schools
- NCES District ID: 1100030
- School code: DC-001-466
- CEEB code: 090199
- NCES School ID: 110003000131
- Principal: Sylvia Isaac
- Faculty: 38.00 (on an FTE basis)
- Grades: 9–12
- Gender: Coeducational
- Enrollment: 600 (2020–2021)
  - Grade 9: 156
  - Grade 10: 152
  - Grade 11: 151
  - Grade 12: 141
- Student to teacher ratio: 15.79
- Colors: Black and white
- Nickname: Penguins
- USNWR ranking: 68 (2024)
- Website: www.swwhs.org

School Without Walls High School (SWW) is a small public magnet high school in the Foggy Bottom neighborhood of Washington, D.C. It is colloquially referred to by students and faculty as "Walls." The school is based on a concept in urban education that encourages students to "use the city as a classroom," which is the origin of its name.

SWW offers a college-preparatory academic curriculum with 22 AP courses. It is part of the District of Columbia Public Schools (DCPS) system and draws students from all parts of the city. Applicants must earn at least a 3.0 GPA in seventh grade and the beginning of their eighth-grade year. In the application process, prospective students complete an interview with teachers and current students.

As part of the school's partnership with George Washington University, teachers and students are able to take dual enrollment classes at the university. Students in the GW Early College Program graduate with a high school diploma from School Without Walls and Associate of Arts degree from George Washington University.

== History ==
The school was established in 1971 following the model of the Parkway Program in the School District of Philadelphia. The goal was to create a new learning environment that offered an alternative to the conventional programs. They started with 50 students, 6 teachers, and 1 administrator.

The school is located on the George Washington University (GWU) campus, on G Street intersecting 21st Street NW. Founded in 1971, the School Without Walls was initially located on the 8th floor of the office building at 1411 K St. In the fall of 1973, the school relocated to 10th and H Streets, NW, where SWW shared space with the Webster Girls School program, a program for pregnant teens. It then moved to 1619 M St., NW, in the mid-'70s. In August 2007, Walls was relocated to Capitol Hill in the Logan School building on G Street NE between Second and Third Streets NE (near Union Station and adjacent to the Securities & Exchange Commission headquarters). This temporary home was used for two years while the original building was renovated. The Logan School was renovated—including a new roof and internal work—during the summer of 2007 to accept students. In August 2009, The School Without Walls moved back into the Grant School following an opening ceremony by Mayor Adrian Fenty, DCPS chancellor Michelle Rhee, and GWU President Steven Knapp.

In August 2011, School Without Walls was forced to temporarily close because of damage sustained to the building's walls and roof during the earthquake and Hurricane Irene a few days later.

Despite resistance from parents and students, SWW merged with the nearby Francis-Stevens Education Campus, renamed School Without Walls at Francis Stevens, in 2014. Francis-Stevens, which serves preschool through eighth grade, was under-enrolled and slated for closure, while the School Without Walls building was too small for the student body. The two schools now share an administration, though Francis-Stevens is non-selective, and graduates are not guaranteed entrance to School Without Walls High School. SWW students do not take classes at Francis-Stevens because of the distance between the buildings and because Francis-Stevens quickly became more popular, attaining a waitlist of over 900 in 2016.

== Admissions ==
In 2010, 52% of SWW first-year students came from DCPS middle schools and 33% from charter middle schools. The school received more than 1,300 applications for 140 spots in the first-year class for the 2018–19 school year.

During the 2020–2021 school year, SWW students were 48% White, 25% Black, 12% Hispanic/Latino, 8% Asian, and 6% multiracial. The student body was also 12% economically disadvantaged and 60% female.

SWW has the fewest minority and at-risk students among DCPS high schools. In 2019, DCPS rolled out a pilot program to allow students ranked in the top 15 at their schools to take the SWW admissions test even if they had not met the minimum criteria of meeting or exceeding expectations on the PARCC. The objective was to determine if relaxing standardized testing requirements would diversify the SWW student body. However, because DCPS did not inform prospective parents about the program, the 226 affected students were ultimately not permitted to take the admissions test.

== Extracurricular activities ==
Walls competes in the DCIAA and offers the following sports: baseball, basketball, bowling, cheerleading, cross-country, flag football, golf, indoor track, lacrosse, outdoor track, soccer, squash, swimming, softball, tennis, ultimate frisbee, and weightlifting. Before the school adopted the penguin as its mascot, its teams were informally called the Walls.

The SWW volleyball team won the school's first DCIAA title in 1997. The Track and Field team went to the Penn Relay 2011. The softball team won the citywide championship in 2011 and 2012.

Sprinter Ingrid Joseph won Gatorade Player of the Year for Girls Outdoor Track and Field in 2017, the first time a Walls student won that award in any sport.

== Campus ==
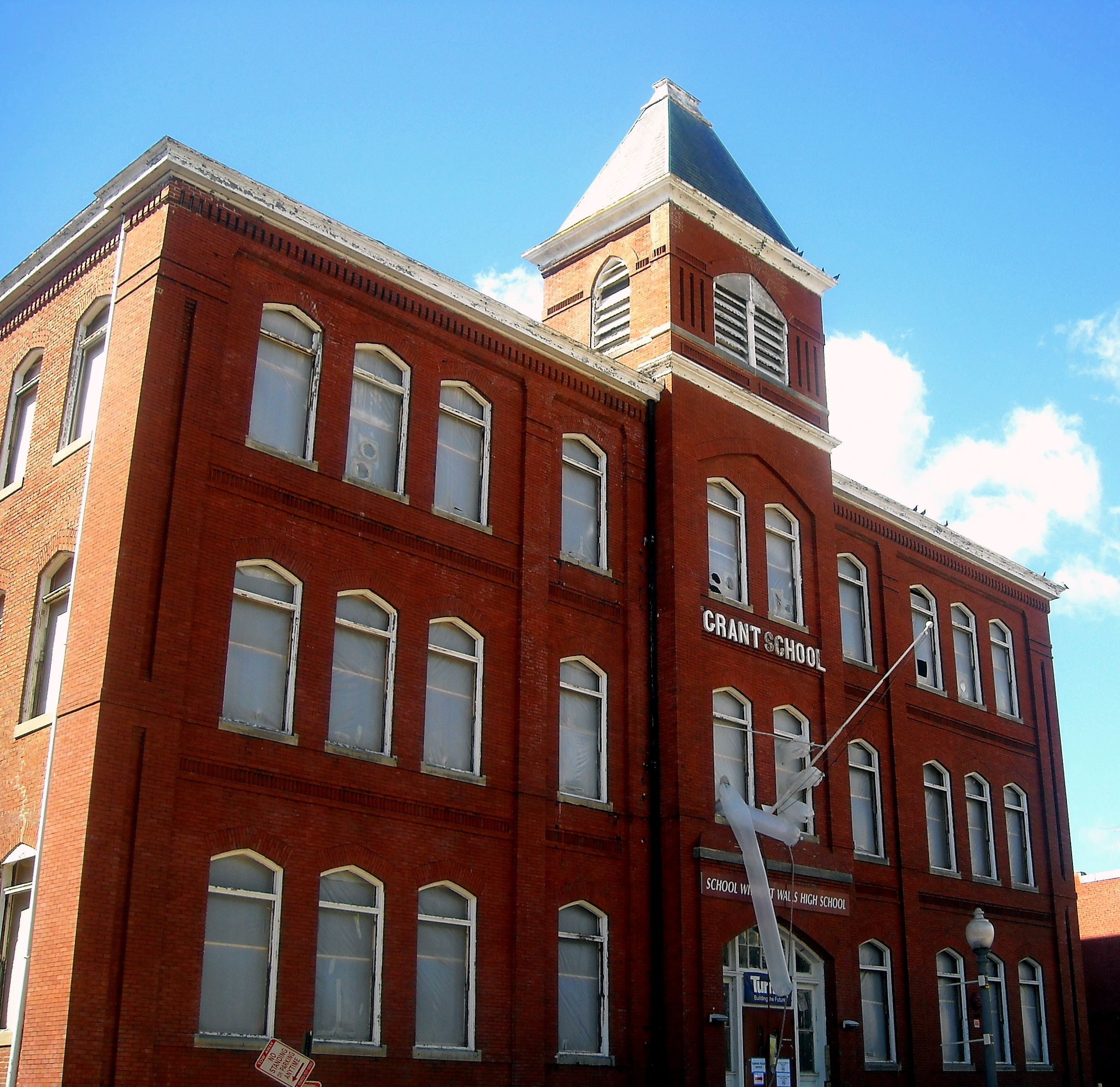
Grant School during renovations

The School Without Walls facility, historically known as the Ulysses S. Grant School, is located in the Foggy Bottom neighborhood.

The building was in poor condition before being taken over by School Without Walls. There was extensive water damage throughout the school, the brick facade needed to be repainted, and the slate roof was steadily losing its shingles. On February 13, 2006, the D.C. City Council and the George Washington University Board of Trustees approved a $12 million deal to renovate and expand the school building in exchange for the transfer of the school's rear parking lot to the university.

The old facade was kept intact while the interior was renovated. A new building was added as an additional wing to accommodate increasing enrollment.

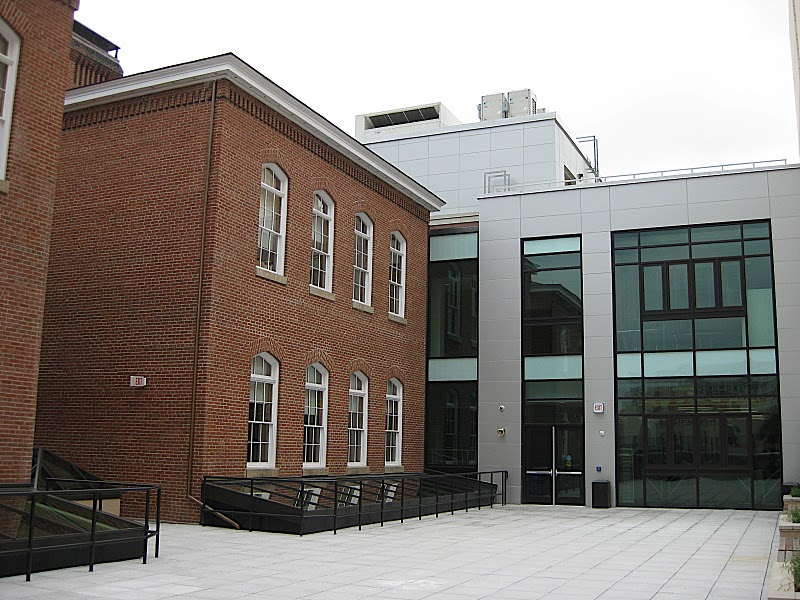
The terrace

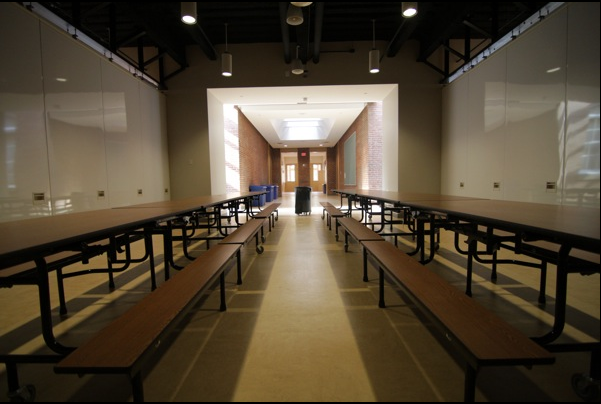
Tables in the multipurpose cafeteria

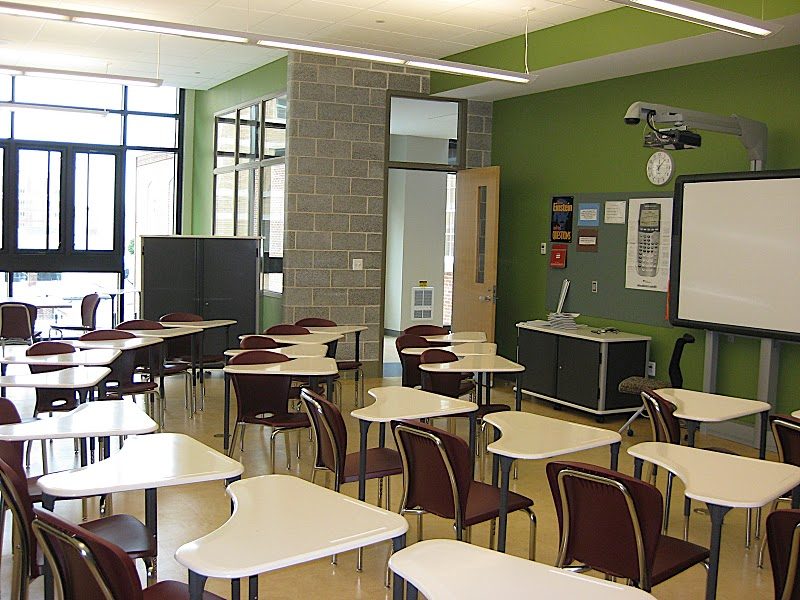
A classroom

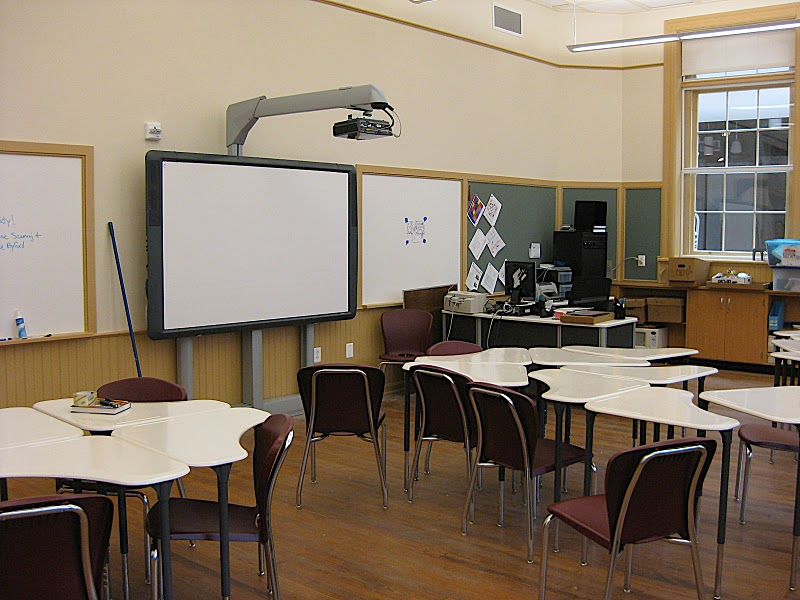
Another classroom

== Awards and recognition ==
Walls was named a National Blue Ribbon School on September 9, 2010, one of 304 schools nationwide. Art students have won numerous awards for their artwork—including 2011's National Cherry Blossom Festival Youth Poster Contest.

=== Rankings ===
In its public high school rankings for 2024, U.S. News & World Report placed Walls first in the District of Columbia and 68th in the United States. The 2024 high school rankings from Niche listed Walls as the best public high school in the District of Columbia and the 43rd best public magnet high school in the United States.

=== Test scores ===
Walls has had the highest average SAT scores among DCPS high schools since the district began publishing data in 2013. The school's average combined score was 1303 in 2024. In 2024, 91% of Walls students who took an AP exam earned a passing score of at least 3.

== School Without Walls at Francis-Stevens ==
School Without Walls at Francis-Stevens

Location
- 2425 N St NW; Washington, D.C. 20037; United States

Information
- Type: Public school
- Established: 1868 (158 years ago)
- Head of school: Sylvia Isaac (acting)
- Grades: PK3-8
- Enrollment: 473
- Mascot: Penguin
- Website: www.swwfs.org

School Without Walls at Francis-Stevens is a pre-K 3 to 8th-grade school that shares an administration with School Without Walls High School. It is located in the Foggy Bottom neighborhood and operated by DC Public Schools. Unlike a high school, it is a traditional public school that primarily accepts students based on its enrollment boundary. Students may also enroll through the D.C. School Lottery if space is available. Middle school graduates are not guaranteed admission to School Without Walls High School. Instead, they feed into Cardozo Education Campus for ninth grade. Ross and Thomson elementary school graduates may transfer to Francis-Stevens in sixth grade.

The school had struggled with low enrollment for decades, prompting the creation of the first extended-day program in the District of Columbia in 1977 to appeal to parents who worked in the neighborhood. The persistent problem led to the merger of Thaddeus Stevens Elementary School and Francis Junior High School in 2008 and then the decision to close Francis-Stevens Education Campus in 2014.

== Notable alumni ==
- Rajah Caruth, Class of 2020, NASCAR driver
- Janeese Lewis George, Class of 2006, DC councilmember from Ward 4 and Democratic nominee for the 2026 DC mayoral election
