= Jack Lamberson House =

Historic house in Iowa, United States

- U.S. National Register of Historic Places
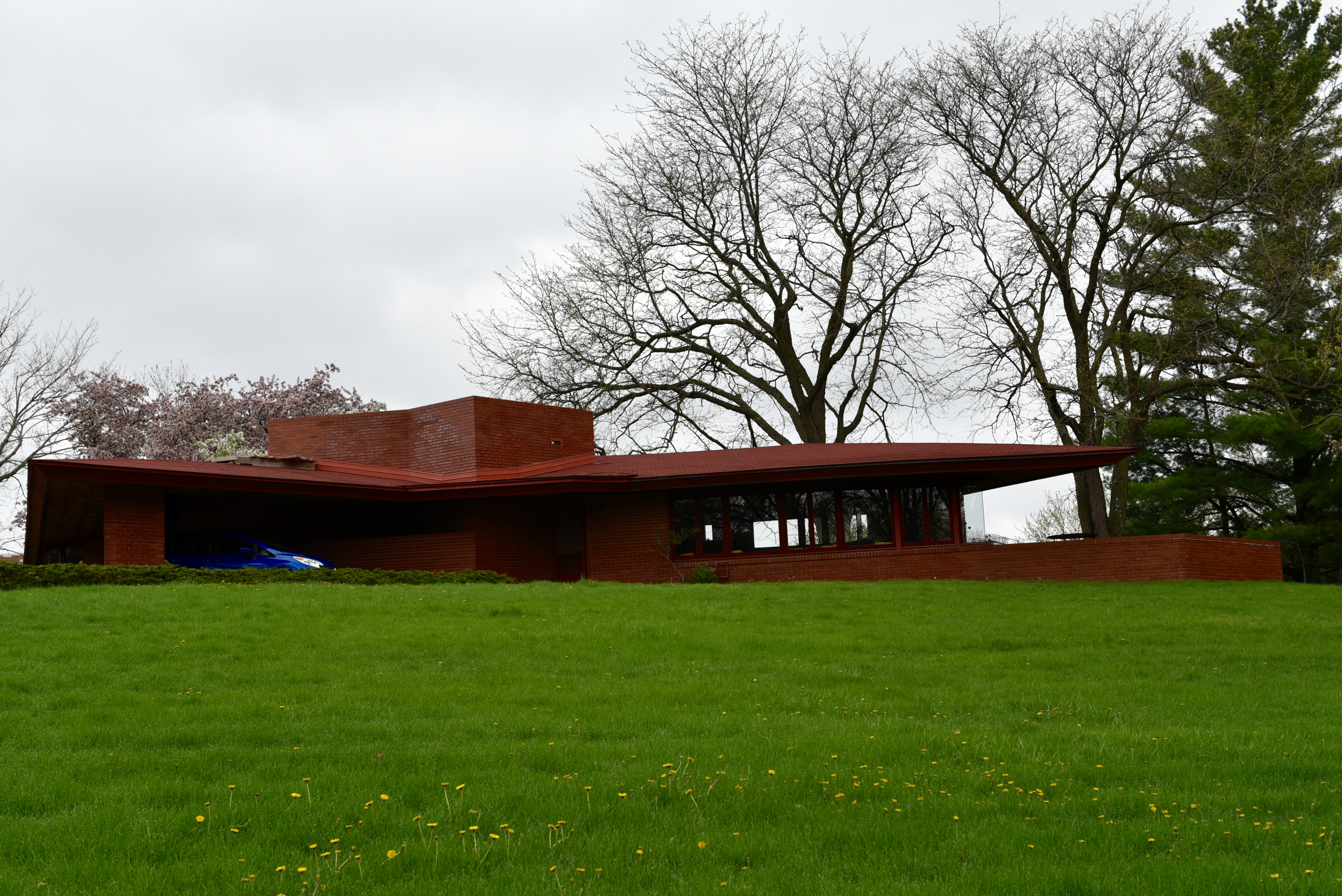

- Location within Iowa Location within the United States
- Location: 511 N. Park Ave. Oskaloosa, Iowa
- Coordinates: 41°18′1″N 92°37′40″W
- Area: 2 acres (0.81 ha)
- Built: 1951
- Architect: Frank Lloyd Wright
- Architectural style: Usonian
- NRHP reference No.: 88002146
- Added to NRHP: 11/09/1988

The Alice and Jack Lamberson House, also known as the Peter Maunu and Irmi Maunu-Kocian house, is a historic residence located in Oskaloosa, Iowa, United States. It is one of seven Frank Lloyd Wright-designed Usonian houses located in Iowa, and one of two that were constructed in Oskaloosa. Both were completed in 1951. The Lamberson house is unique from the other Iowa Usonians for its extensive use of 60º and 120º angles. It features a low, sweeping pitched roof that makes the house look deceptively large, yet it is the second smallest of Iowa's Usonians. It was listed on the National Register of Historic Places in 1988.

== See also ==
- National Register of Historic Places listings in Mahaska County, Iowa
- List of Frank Lloyd Wright works
