= Paradise Block Historic District =

Historic district in Iowa, United States

- U.S. National Register of Historic Places
- U.S. Historic district
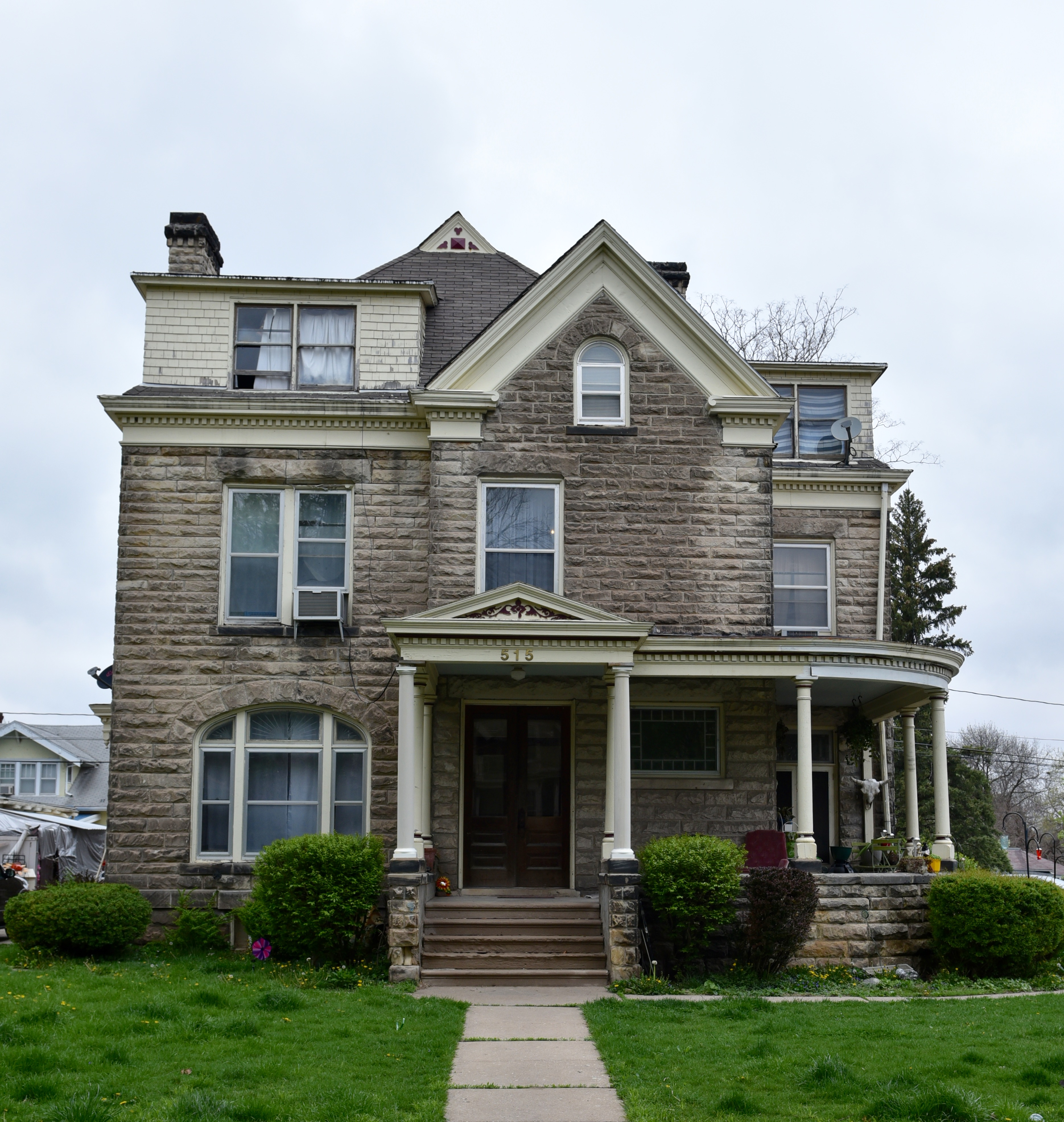
- Wightman-Kalbach House (1893)

- Location within Iowa Location within the United States
- Location: 402, 406, 408, 410, 414, 418, and 510-714 High Ave. E, Oskaloosa, Iowa
- Coordinates: 41°17′43″N 92°38′18″W
- Area: 10.45 acres (4.23 ha)
- Architect: Multiple
- Architectural style: Late 19th and Early 20th Century American Movements; Late 19th and 20th Century Revivals; Late Victorian
- MPS: Oskaloosa MPS
- NRHP reference No.: 91001767
- Added to NRHP: December 13, 1991

The Paradise Block Historic District is a nationally recognized historic district located in Oskaloosa, Iowa, United States. It was listed on the National Register of Historic Places in 1991. At the time of its nomination it contained 43 resources, which included 26 residences, two churches, 12 garages, two brick driveways, and a vacant lot. Of these, 35 are considered contributing properties. The eight non-contributing properties include the vacant lot, two houses and a garage built after 1935, and four otherwise historic houses that have been significantly altered and have lost significant architectural elements. The contributing properties were built between 1853 and 1917, with 15 of them being built between 1880 and 1900. Two of the houses, the Smith-Johnson House (1853) and the Seeberger-Loring-Kilburn House (1859), are individually listed on the National Register. The churches include the First Church of Christ, Scientist (1912), a Neoclassical structure covered with stucco, and St. Paul Congregational United Church of Christ (1914), a Neoclassical brick structure.

The neighborhood was historically the home to leading businessmen and professionals in Oskaloosa. It contains the largest and most intact examples of late 19th and early 20th century residences in the city. Both vernacular and high style designs are included. Several of the structures were designed by architects, including the two churches. All of the houses are single family residences, and most are frame structures, with five being brick and one of stone construction.
