= Thomas J. Conover House =

Historic house in Iowa, United States

- U.S. National Register of Historic Places
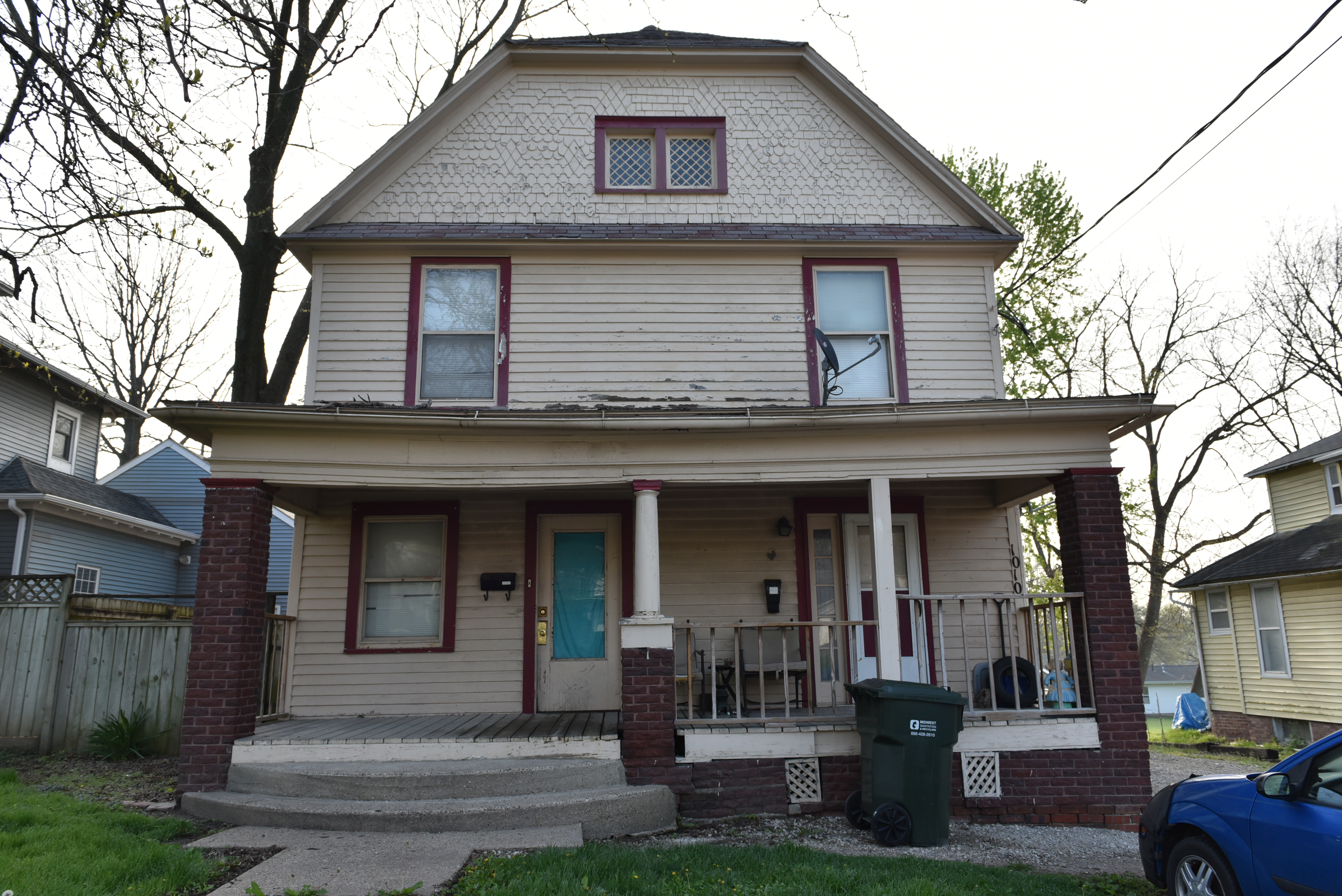

- Location within Iowa Location within the United States
- Location: 1010 N. Market St. Oskaloosa, Iowa
- Coordinates: 41°18′14″N 92°38′42″W
- Area: less than one acre
- Built: 1910
- Architectural style: Colonial Revival
- MPS: Quaker Testimony in Oskaloosa MPS
- NRHP reference No.: 96000342
- Added to NRHP: March 28, 1996

The Thomas J. Conover House is a historic residence located in Oskaloosa, Iowa, United States. Thomas J. Conover was a farmer who retired to town as a widower about 1910. He and his daughter Casa Mae Conover, lived here together while she worked at William Penn College. Between 1925 and 1951 she was a teacher of religious education, assistant registrar, secretary to the president, and the registrar. Single women who worked for the college rarely owned their own home. This suggests the difference in pay between men and women at the institution, even as it espoused gender equality. Casa had to live with her father and care for him in his old-age. Their Colonial Revival house was built about 1910. It is a two-story, frame, single-family dwelling that features a gable-end facade roof with hip-on-gable roof embellishment, fishscale shingles on the gable end, and a full-length front porch. It is the Casa Mae Conover's association with the school in the context of the Quaker testimony in Oskaloosa that makes this house historic. It was listed on the National Register of Historic Places in 1996.
