= Prof. Edgar H. and Irene D. Stranahan House =

Historic house in Iowa, United States

- U.S. National Register of Historic Places
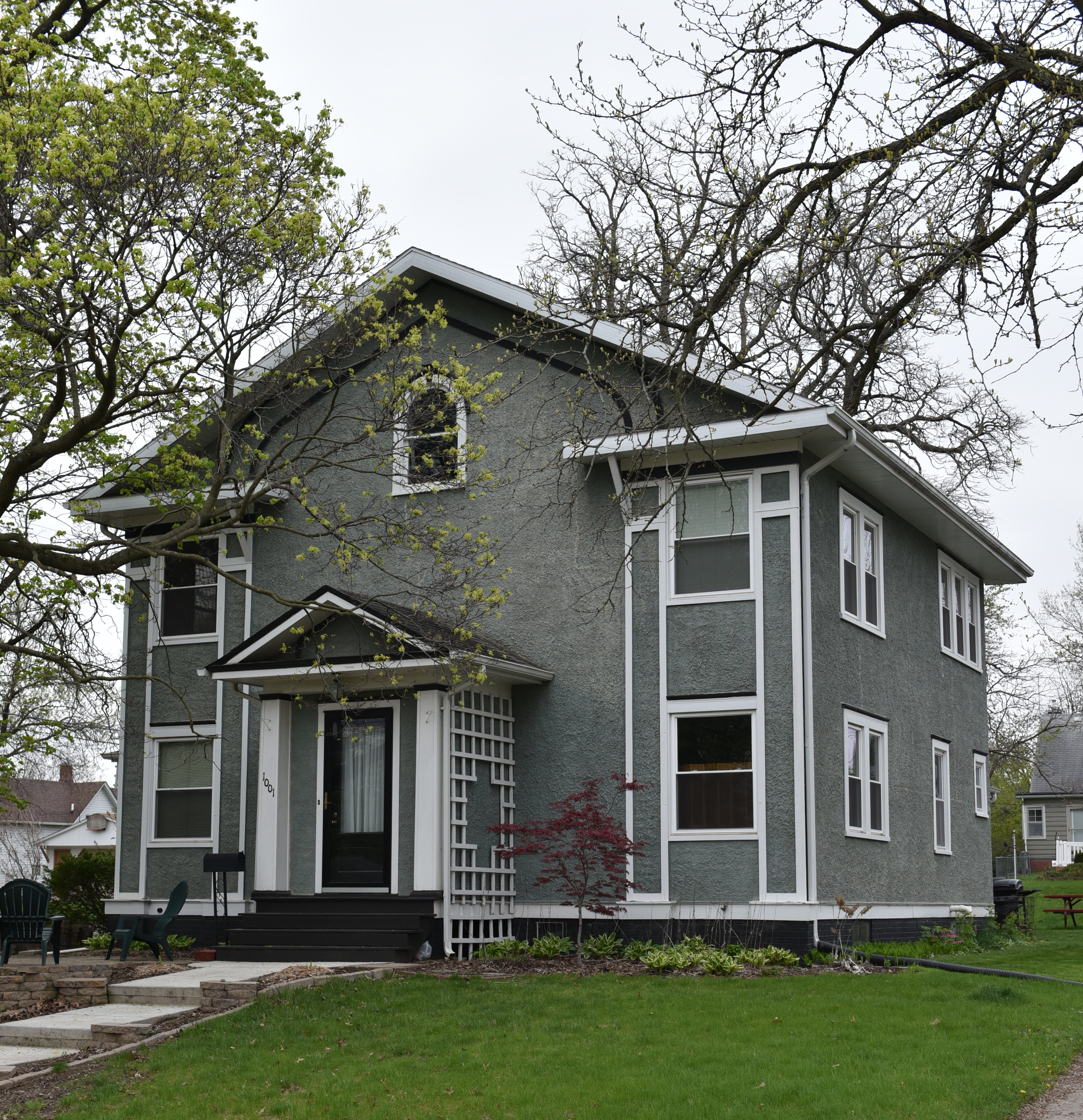

- Location within Iowa Location within the United States
- Location: 1001 Gurney St. Oskaloosa, Iowa
- Coordinates: 41°18′23″N 92°38′49″W
- Area: less than one acre
- Built: 1923
- MPS: Quaker Testimony in Oskaloosa MPS
- NRHP reference No.: 96000345
- Added to NRHP: March 28, 1996

The Prof. Edgar H. and Irene D. Stranahan House is a historic residence located in Oskaloosa, Iowa, United States. Both Stranahans taught religious education at William Penn College, and he was one of the longer serving faculty members. Their daughter Esther taught religion at the college, which calls attention to family members from more than one generation who worked at the college. Edgar also served as master of ceremonies for the Oskaloosa Chautauqua in the 1920s. The Stranahans were among the first to settle in the Penn College Addition. The college platted and sold these lots, which in turn helped the institution financially survive. This two-story, single-family, frame dwelling is covered with stucco. It features vertical boards that define pilasters on the main facade, Moorish-type arch worked into the stucco, a front entry with pilasters that support a pedimented gable roof, and a solarium. It is the Stranahans' association with the college in the context of the Quaker testimony in Oskaloosa that makes this house historic. It was listed on the National Register of Historic Places in 1996.
