= Spring Creek Meeting House-H Street Mission =

- Spring Creek Meeting House- H Street Mission
- U.S. National Register of Historic Places
- Location within Iowa Location within the United States
- Location: 207 N. H St. Oskaloosa, Iowa
- Coordinates: 41°17′47.7″N 92°39′17″W
- MPS: The Quaker Testimony in Oskaloosa, Iowa MPS
- NRHP reference No.: 96000339
- Added to NRHP: March 28, 1996

The Spring Creek Meeting House-H Street Mission was an historic building in Oskaloosa, Iowa, United States. The frame building was built sometime after an 1878 fire destroyed the original meeting house. It was relocated from its original rural location to this site in 1895. The Spring Creek Meeting was organized in 1844 outside of town. It calls attention to the movement of the Quakers from a rural setting to a central location in town. After its relocation it became a mission of the Oskaloosa Monthly Meeting. This illustrates the evangelical nature of the Iowa Yearly Meeting after the Schism of 1877, and their willingness to proselytize in order to rectify the decline in membership on the frontier. Such a move was an anomaly among Eastern Quakers. The architecture itself shows a shift in Quaker meeting houses in Iowa from structures that were long and low to this one with its high-pitched gable roof. It was listed on the National Register of Historic Places in 1996. The building has subsequently been torn down.
