= Oskaloosa Post Office =

- U.S. National Register of Historic Places
- Location within Iowa Location within the United States
- Location: 206 N. Market St. Oskaloosa, Iowa
- Coordinates: 41°17′47″N 92°38′42″W
- Area: less than one acre
- Built: 1902
- Architectural style: Renaissance Revival
- NRHP reference No.: 100004975
- Added to NRHP: February 6, 2020

The former Oskaloosa Post Office is a historic building located in Oskaloosa, Iowa, United States. Completed in 1902, the Italian Renaissance Revival structure is composed of brick with decorative details in limestone and terra cotta. Plans in 2013 to convert the building into housing fell through. In 2019, a restoration project was begun to shore up the building. It was listed on the National Register of Historic Places in 2020.
