= Maj. James W. McMullin House =

Historic house in Iowa, United States

- U.S. National Register of Historic Places
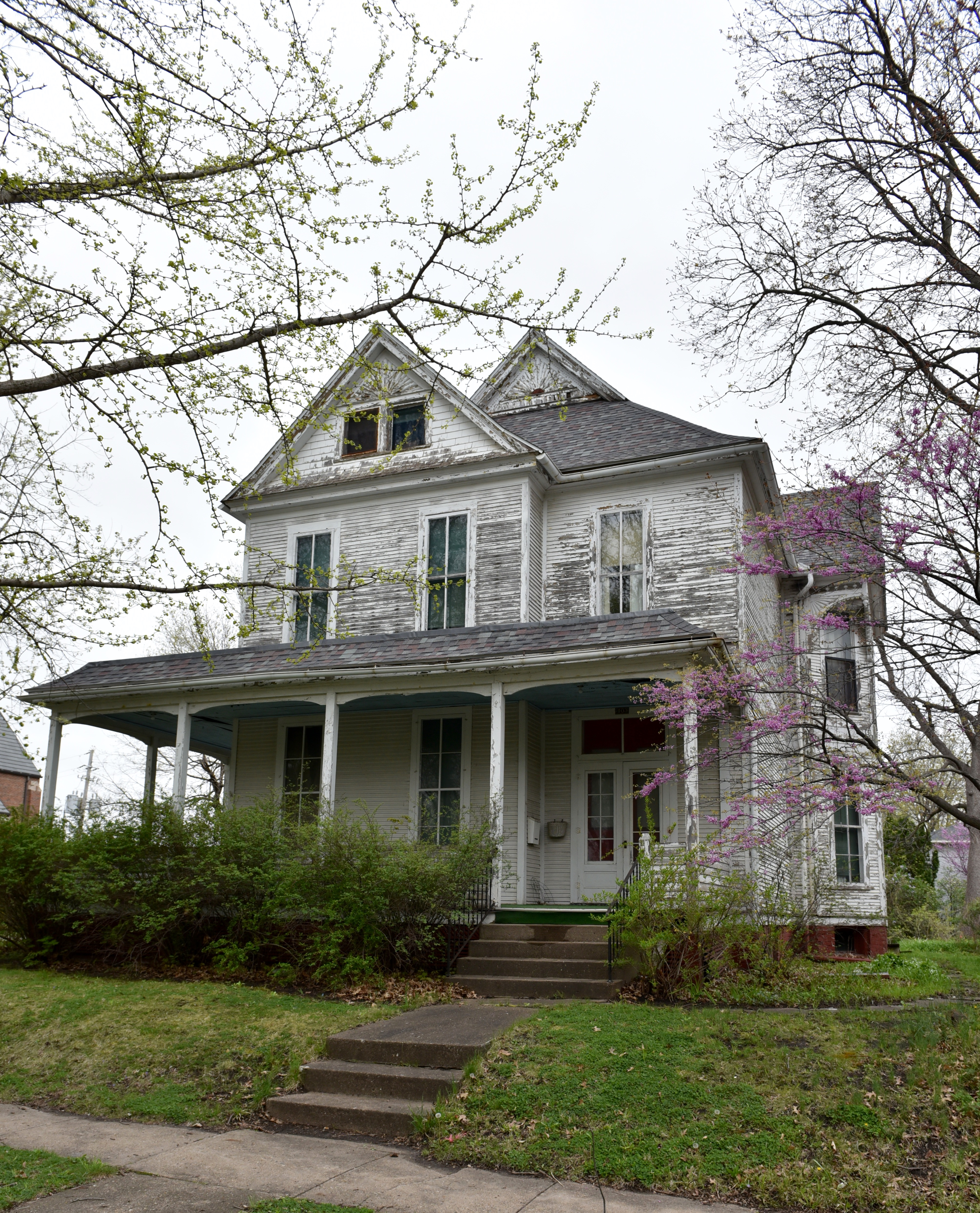

- Location within Iowa Location within the United States
- Location: 403 1st Ave., E. Oskaloosa, Iowa
- Coordinates: 41°17′40″N 92°38′28″W
- Area: less than one acre
- Built: 1882
- Architectural style: Queen Anne
- NRHP reference No.: 85000723
- Added to NRHP: April 11, 1985

The Maj. James W. McMullin House is a historic residence located in Oskaloosa, Iowa, United States. McMullin received his commission in the army during the American Civil War. He returned to Oskaloosa after his service where he established a successful transport and livery business that served Mahaska County's coal industry. McMullin meant for his Queen Anne style home to be a showplace. It was designed by an unknown architect to be built of brick, but because of price gouging by local brick dealers he chose to have his home built of wood instead. Structurally, the house has a balloon frame covered with clapboards. It features an asymmetrical plan, a wrap-around porch, and bay windows. The interior is noteworthy for its woodwork and exuberant plasterwork. It was listed on the National Register of Historic Places in 1985.
