= Dr. Ella Stokes House =

Historic house in Iowa, United States

- U.S. National Register of Historic Places
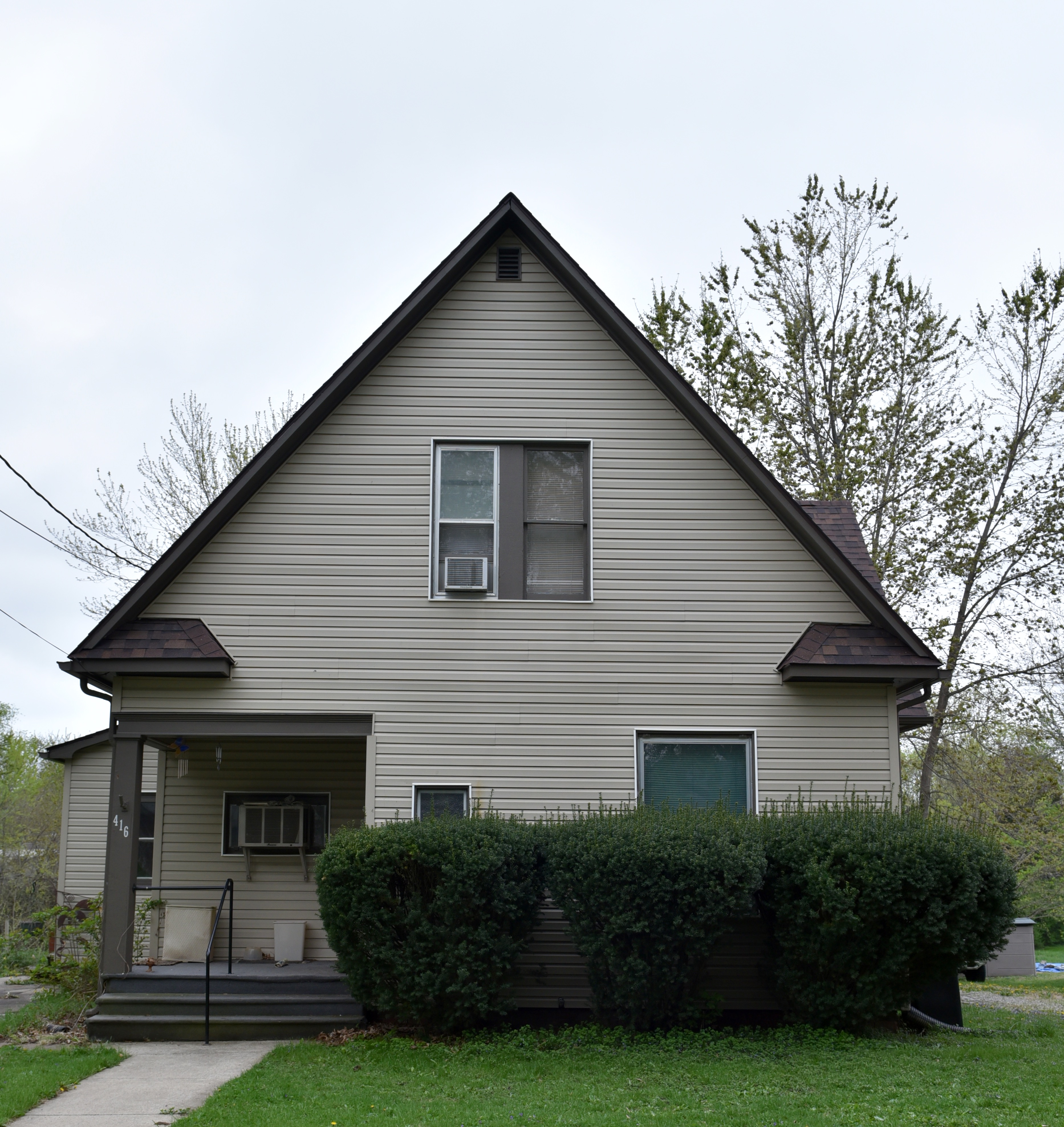

- Location within Iowa Location within the United States
- Location: 3416 W. College Hill Ave. Oskaloosa, Iowa
- Coordinates: 41°18′20″N 92°38′59″W
- Area: less than one acre
- Built: 1910
- MPS: Quaker Testimony in Oskaloosa MPS
- NRHP reference No.: 96000349
- Added to NRHP: March 29, 1996

The Dr. Ella Stokes House is a historic residence located in Oskaloosa, Iowa, United States. Dr. Stokes taught at William Penn College for four decades, and was one of the longest serving faculty members. She taught history, education, and philosophy during her career. Stokes lived in this modest house for more than half of the time she served on the faculty. She was one of the few female employees of the school who could afford to buy her own home, but she had to sell produce on the side and take in boarders in order to accomplish it. It is Stokes' association with the school in the context of the Quaker testimony in Oskaloosa that makes this house historic. It was listed on the National Register of Historic Places in 1996.
