= Gary J. and Matilda Vermeer Farmstead =

- U.S. National Register of Historic Places
- Location within Iowa Location within the United States
- Location: 1688 250th Ave. Pella, Iowa
- Coordinates: 41°24′33.9″N 92°52′13.9″W
- Built: 1953
- NRHP reference No.: 100002682
- Added to NRHP: July 23, 2018

The Gary J. and Matilda Vermeer Farmstead is a historic building located east of Pella, Iowa, United States, in Mahaska County. Gerrit "Gary" Vermeer was born on a farm outside of Pella on September 29, 1918, and was educated in the local schools. He married Matilda Van Gorp at her parents’ farm on February 14, 1941. They farmed a 120-acre (49 ha) farm that had been given to them by his parents. They built this modest house on that farm in 1953 and lived here the rest of their married life. Gary invented a wagon hoist that made it easier to unload corn. It became so popular that he and his cousin, Ralph Vermeer, started the Vermeer Company to manufacture the device as well as other agricultural implements. In 1971 Gary developed the Vermeer round hay baler, "an invention that revolutionized agriculture." In addition to his business and farming, Gary was involved in the Pella community and The Christian Reformed Church in North America. He died in Pella on February 2, 2009. Matilda, who was born near Pella on February 14, 1920, died on July 19, 2014. They are buried in Oakwood Cemetery, Pella. The farmstead was listed on the National Register of Historic Places in 2018.
