= Spurgin Residence =

Historic house in Iowa, United States

- U.S. National Register of Historic Places
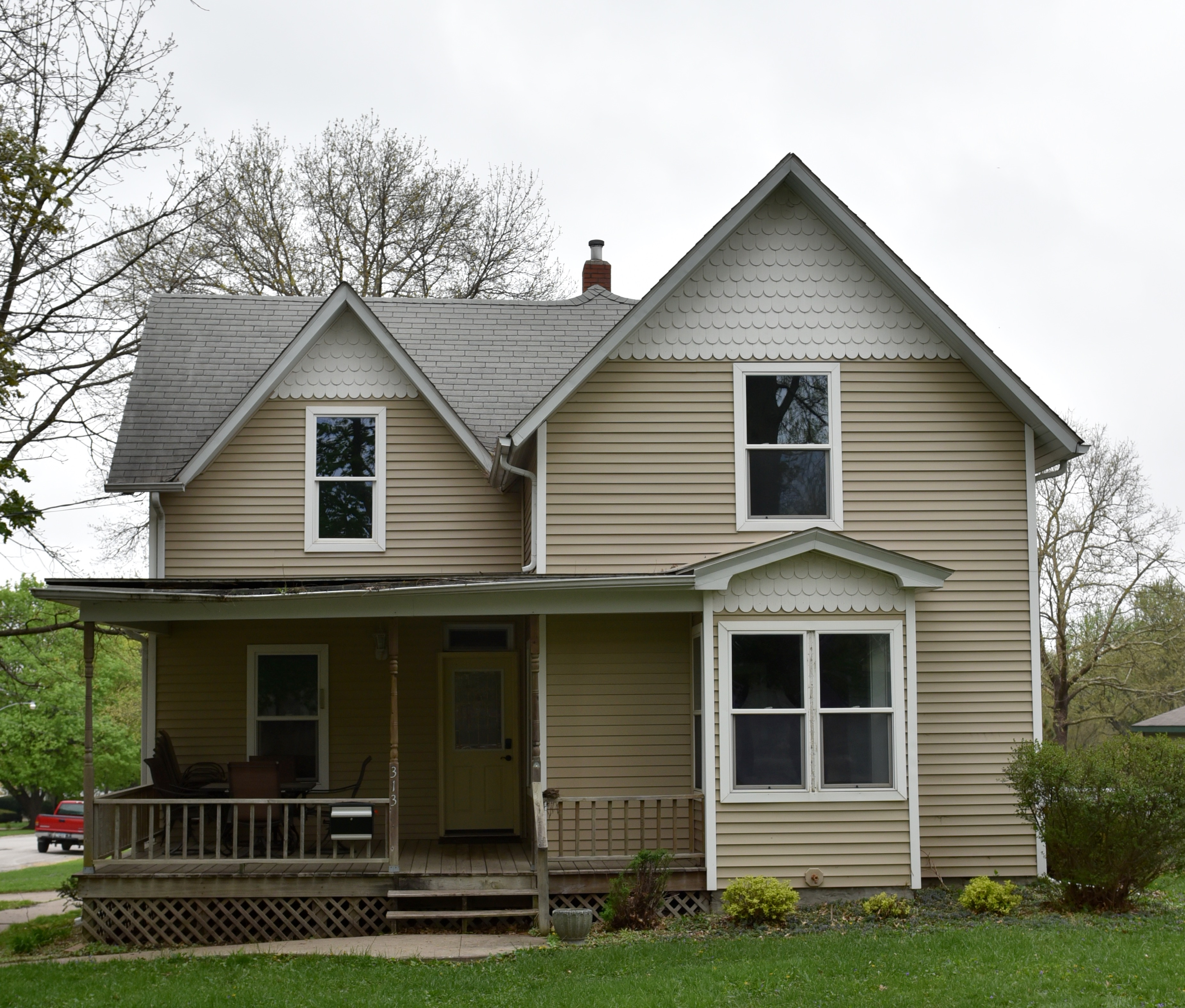

- Location within Iowa Location within the United States
- Location: 313 College Ave. Oskaloosa, Iowa
- Coordinates: 41°18′13″N 92°38′52″W
- Area: less than one acre
- Built: 1895
- Architectural style: Vernacular
- MPS: Quaker Testimony in Oskaloosa MPS
- NRHP reference No.: 96000341
- Added to NRHP: March 28, 1996

The Spurgin Residence, also known as the Rice House, is a historic residence located in Oskaloosa, Iowa, United States. The 1½-story, frame, single-family house was built in 1895. From 1916 to about 1936 the structure was used as a "practice house" for domestic science instruction and student housing at nearby William Penn College. It is its association with the college in the context of the Quaker testimony in Oskaloosa that makes this house historic. The name "Spurgin Residence" was used by the college during its period of significance. It was listed on the National Register of Historic Places in 1996.
