= Spring Creek Friends Cemetery =

Historic site in Mahaska County, Iowa

- U.S. National Register of Historic Places
- Location within Iowa Location within the United States
- Location: Junction of Osburn Ave. and 235th St.
- Nearest city: Oskaloosa, Iowa
- Coordinates: 41°18′42″N 92°36′10″W
- MPS: The Quaker Testimony in Oskaloosa, Iowa MPS
- NRHP reference No.: 96000351
- Added to NRHP: March 29, 1996

The Spring Creek Friends Cemetery is a historic site located northeast of Oskaloosa, Iowa, United States. The approximately one-half acre plot of land contains an unknown number of burials with about 123 having plain markers that date from the 1860s through the 1890s. There is a network of pedestrian paths in the cemetery, and it is surrounded by a fence with concrete posts on the south, west, and north sides. The cemetery was founded about 1848 and continued to accept burials until about 1892. It calls attention to the earliest period of Quaker settlement in Iowa, which at that time was primarily a rural phenomenon. The Spring Creek Meeting was established here in the 1840s or the 1850s, and was the site of the first Iowa Yearly Meeting in 1863. The Spring Creek Meeting merged with the Center Grove Meeting in 1894 and formed the Oskaloosa Monthly Meeting. The meetinghouse subsequently moved into Oskaloosa, and burials here dropped off. The cemetery was listed on the National Register of Historic Places in 1996.
