= John K. Voorhees House =

Historic house in Iowa, United States

- U.S. National Register of Historic Places
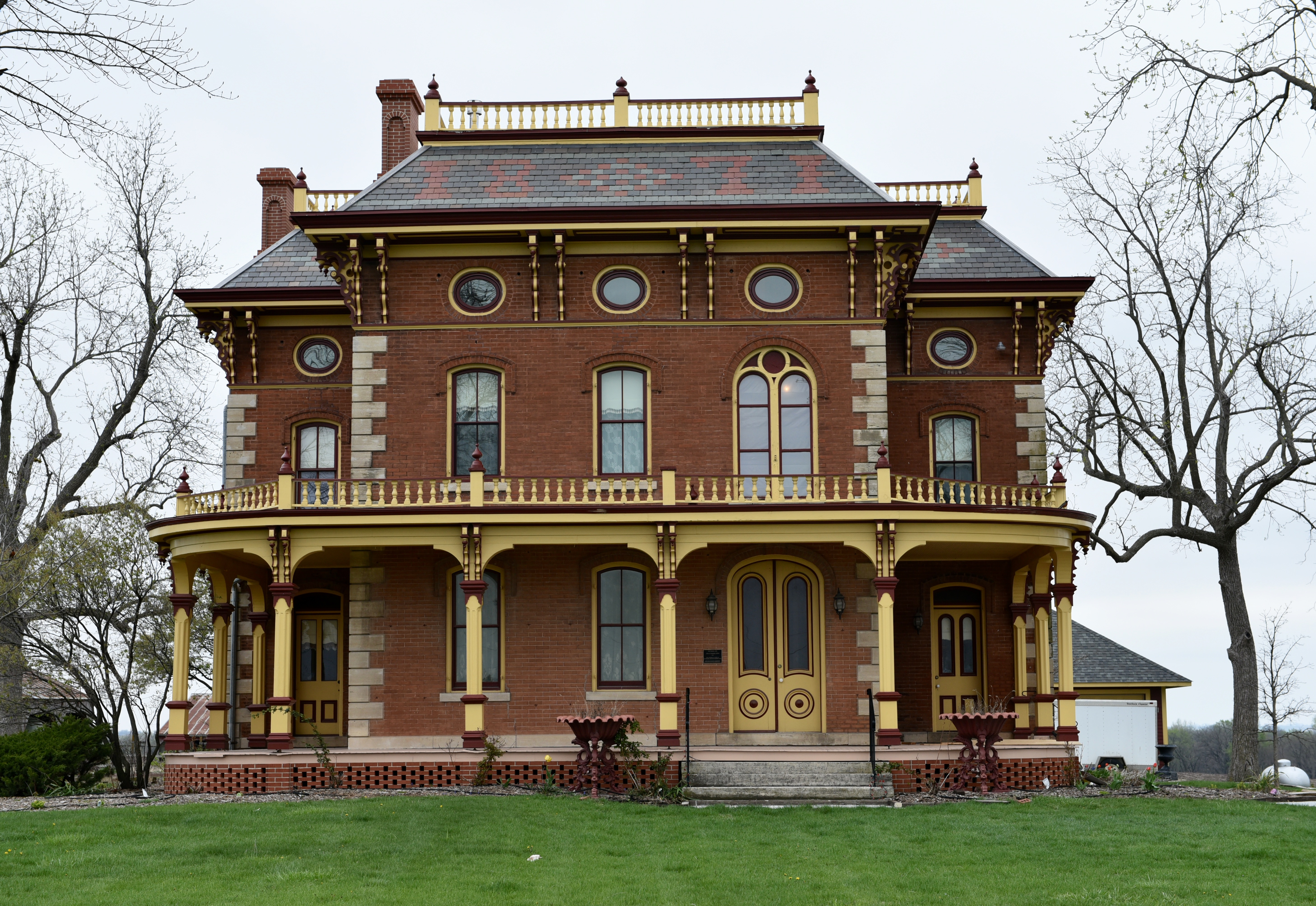

- Location within Iowa Location within the United States
- Location: Northwest of Oskaloosa on Iowa Highway 163
- Coordinates: 41°23′07″N 92°49′22″W
- Area: 1.33 acres (0.54 ha)
- Built: 1871
- Built by: John K. Voorhees
- Architectural style: Italianate; Second Empire
- NRHP reference No.: 82002632
- Added to NRHP: March 5, 1982

The John K. Voorhees House is a historic building located northwest of Oskaloosa, Iowa, United States. A native of Warren County, Ohio, Voorhees settled in Mahaska County in 1853. He owned 400 acres (160 ha), and was considered a leading farmer in the county. He was known for his horses and Black Angus cattle. Voorhees had this house built in 1871, and he supervised the work that was done by masons and carpenters. It is a combination of the Italianate and Second Empire styles. The 2½-story, brick structure follows a T-plan. It features a mansard roof, bracketed eaves, limestone quoins on the front, brick quoins on the back, and a full sized wrap-around front porch. The east section of the original porch and the balustrades on top had been removed. They have subsequently been recreated. The house was listed on the National Register of Historic Places in 1982.
