= Seeberger–Loring–Kilburn House =

Historic house in Iowa, United States

- U.S. National Register of Historic Places
- U.S. Historic district – Contributing property
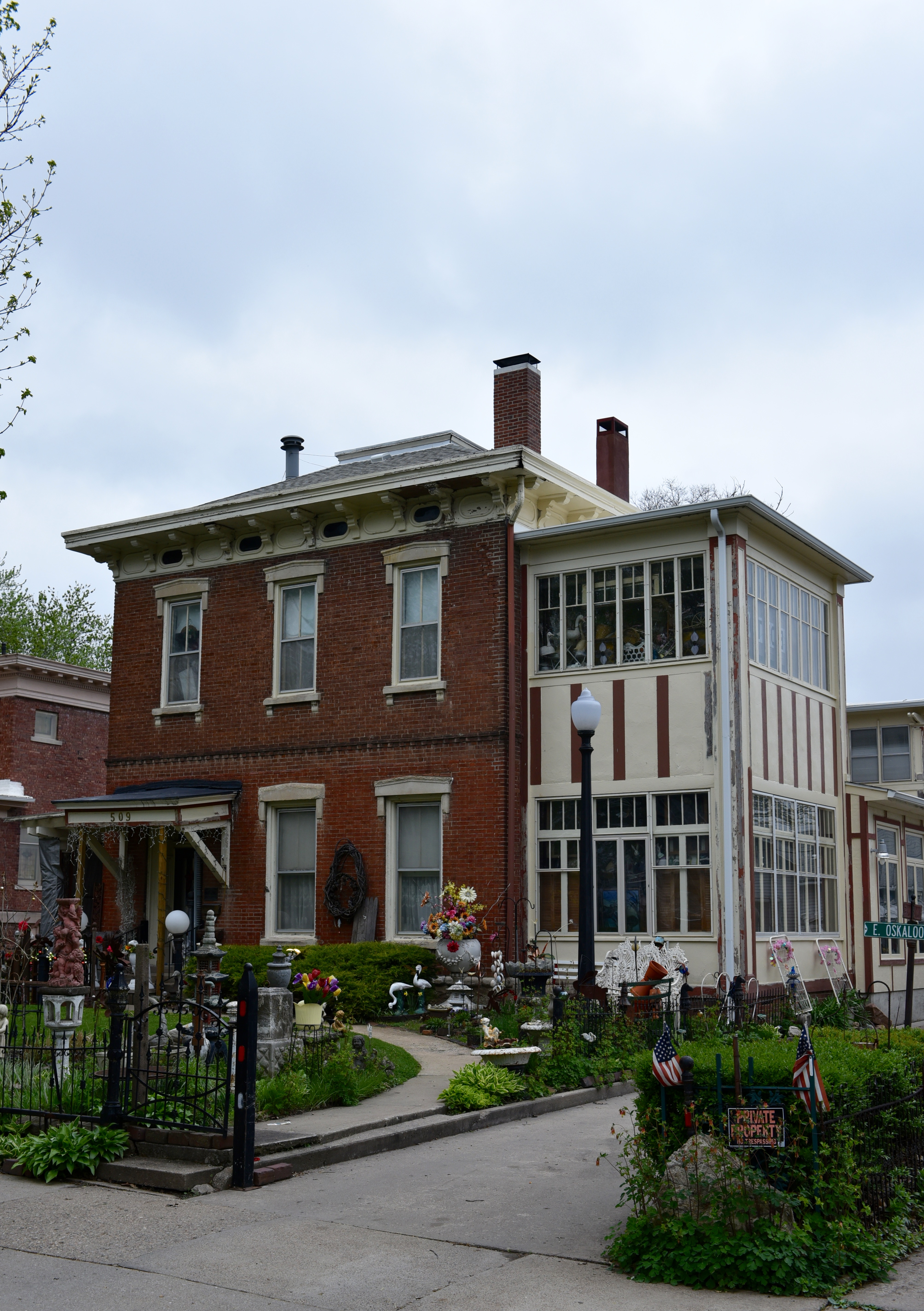

- Location within Iowa Location within the United States
- Location: 509 High Ave., E. Oskaloosa, Iowa
- Coordinates: 41°17′44″N 92°38′22″W
- Area: less than one acre
- Built: 1859
- Built by: David L. Evans
- Architect: David L. Evans; Frank E. Wetherell
- Architectural style: Italianate
- Part of: Paradise Block Historic District (ID91001767)
- NRHP reference No.: 83000390
- Added to NRHP: July 14, 1983

The Seeberger–Loring–Kilburn House is a historic residence located in Oskaloosa, Iowa, United States. The house was the work of David L. Evans, a master builder who completed it in 1859. It is the oldest known surviving work of his, and calls attention to his skill as a builder. Evans was a native of Wales and emigrated to the United States at the age of 14. He settled in Ohio and St. Louis before settling in Oskaloosa in 1845. The two-story, brick, Italianate structure features a hip roof and deck, bracketed cornice and simple hood molds. The second story was added in 1869 by Evans. Des Moines architect Frank E. Wetherell, who was born in Oskaloosa, designed an expansion of the house in 1916. It added the solarium on the east side, and a pergola on the west. The house was individually listed on the National Register of Historic Places in 1983. It was included as a contributing property in the Paradise Block Historic District in 1991.
