= Daniel Nelson House and Barn =

- U.S. National Register of Historic Places
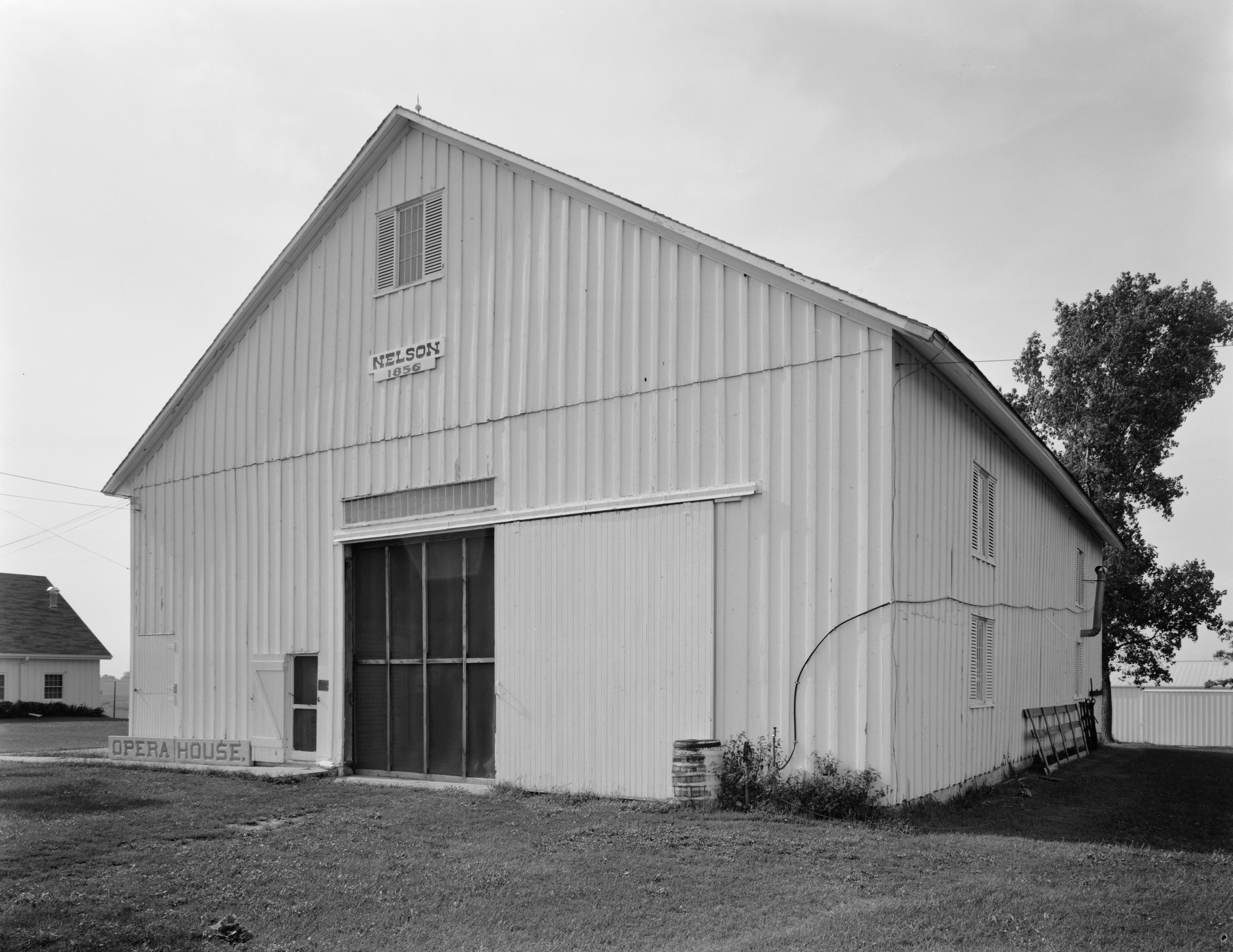

- Location within Iowa Location within the United States
- Location: 2211 Nelson Lane
- Nearest city: Oskaloosa, Iowa
- Coordinates: 41°19′57″N 92°37′17″W
- Built: 1853 (house) (1856) barn
- NRHP reference No.: 74000798
- Added to NRHP: November 20, 1974

Daniel Nelson House and Barn, also known as the Nelson Pioneer Farm and Museum, are historic buildings located north of Oskaloosa, Iowa, United States. Daniel and Margaret Nelson settled here in 1844, a year after this part of Iowa was opened to settlement by the U.S. Government. Their first home was a log structure, non-extant, located northeast of the present house. The present house is a two-story, brick structure with a gable roof. The wooden porches on the front and back of the house date from 1898 to 1900. The large barn measures 61 by 46 feet (19 by 14 m), and was built in 1856. It is composed of board and batten construction from oak that was milled on the site. It was used largely as a granary, rather than a shelter for farm animals. Three other buildings included in the historic designation include the summer kitchen, woodshed, and a small outdoor privy. The dates of construction for the three frame buildings is unknown. The farm remained in the Nelson family until 1941 when it was abandoned with most of the original furnishings intact. The property was donated to the Mahaska County Historical Society, which now operates it as a museum. Other historic buildings have been moved to this location over the years. It was listed on the National Register of Historic Places in 1974.
