= Edmundson Park Historic District =

Historic district in Iowa, United States

- U.S. National Register of Historic Places
- U.S. Historic district
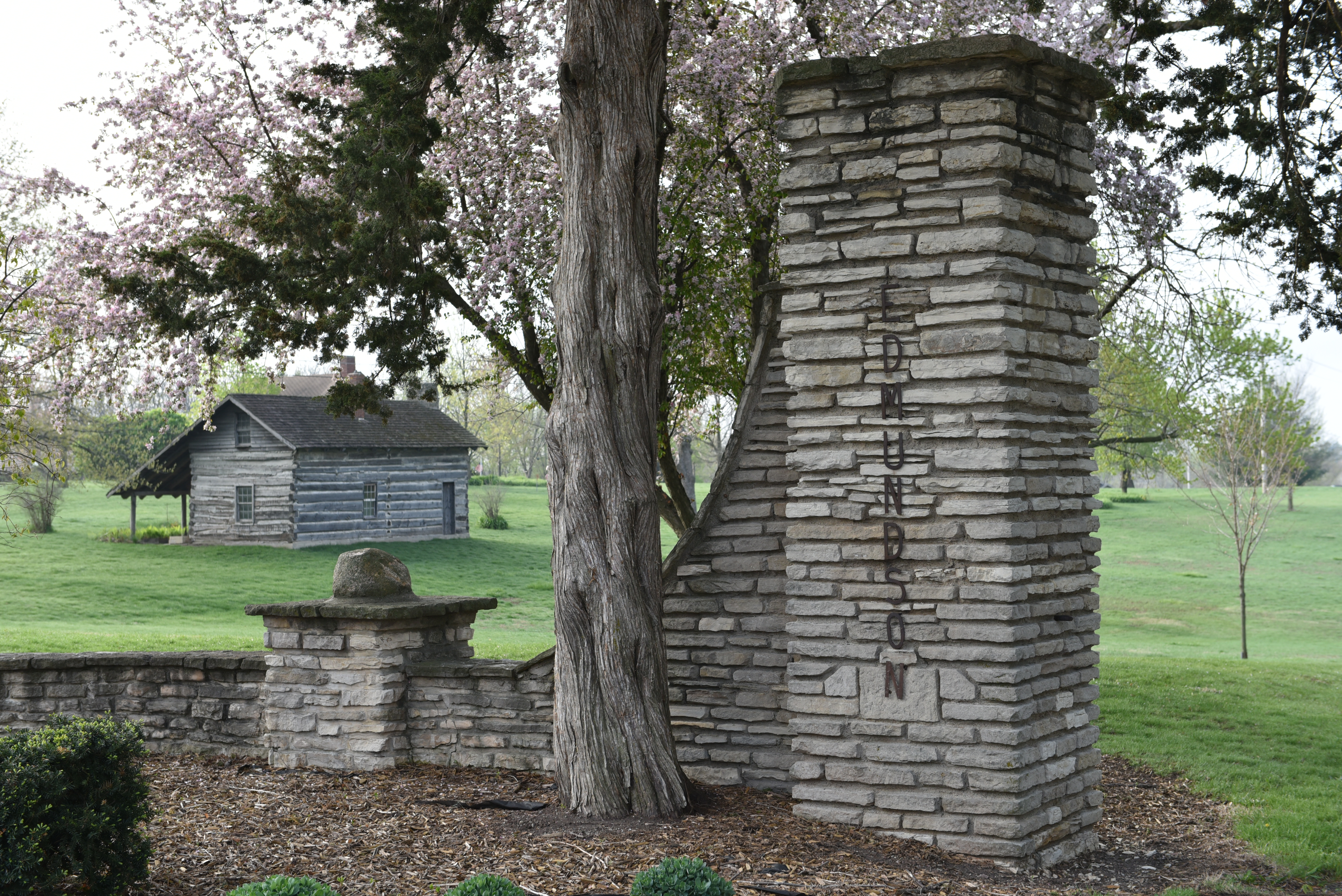

- Location within Iowa Location within the United States
- Location: Junction of 11th Ave., W. and Edmundson Dr. Oskaloosa, Iowa
- Coordinates: 41°17′07″N 92°39′36″W
- Area: 56.5 acres (22.9 ha)
- Built: 1936-1938
- Architect: Ray F. Wyrick
- NRHP reference No.: 07001005
- Added to NRHP: September 27, 2007

The Edmundson Park Historic District is a nationally recognized historic district located in Oskaloosa, Iowa, United States. It was listed on the National Register of Historic Places in 2007. At the time of its nomination it contained 52 resources, which included four contributing buildings, six contributing sites, 19 contributing structures, and three contributing objects. There were also 13 non-contributing buildings, five non-contributing sites, and two non-contributing structures.

The 56.5 acres (22.9 ha) park is an example of a Depression Era public works project that was constructed between 1936 and 1938 by the Works Progress Administration (WPA). James Depew Edmundson, an Iowa attorney who grew up in Oskaloosa, gave a $20,000 bequest to the city to establish a park. City engineer Don Russell saw the New Deal program as an opportunity to add value to the project. The park is the work of landscape architect Ray F. Wyrick. Its structures were designed in the rustic style that was promoted by the National Park Service between 1916 and 1942 for parks supported by all levels of government.
