= John H. Shoemake House =

Historic house in Iowa, United States

- U.S. National Register of Historic Places
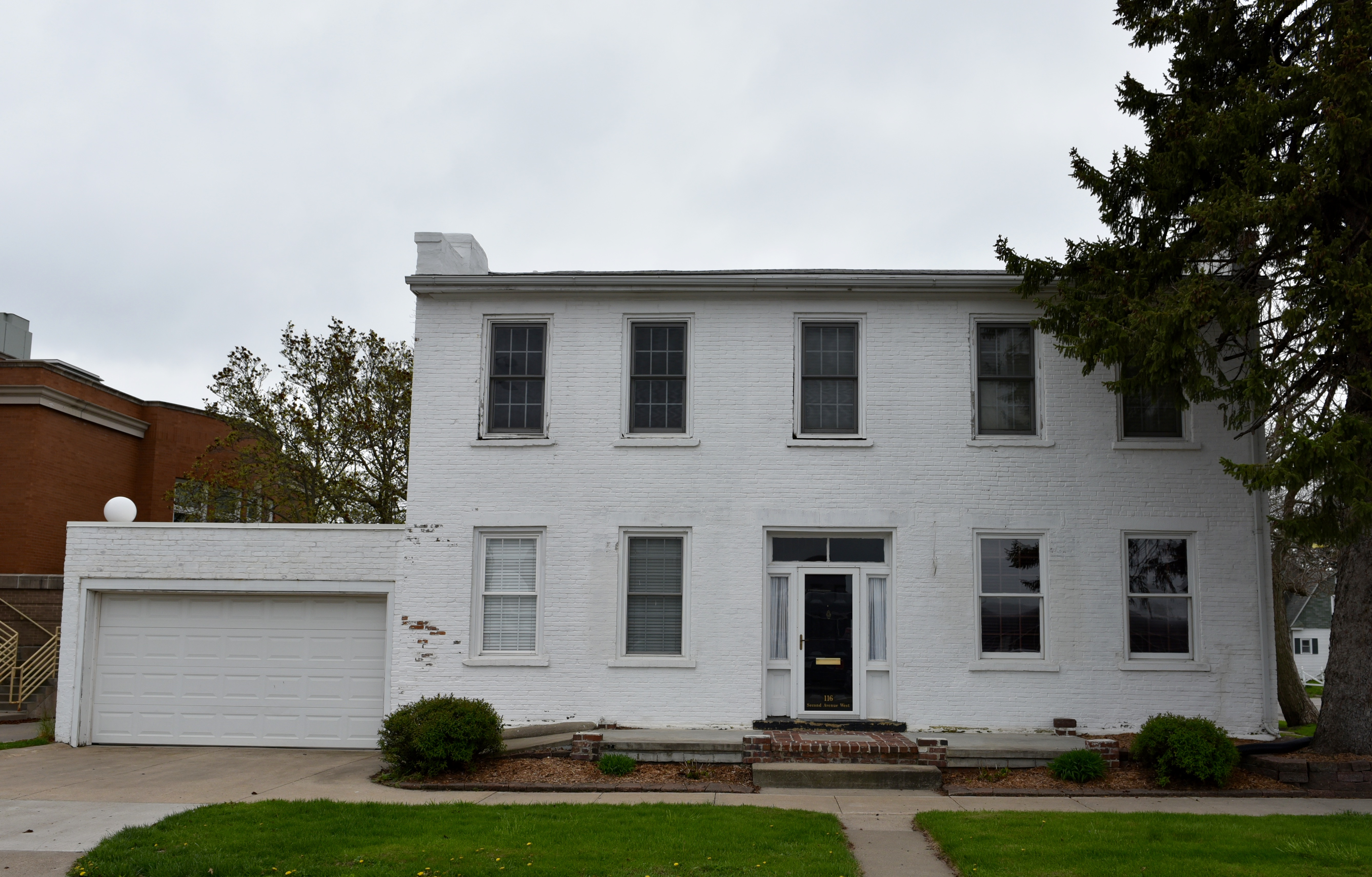

- Location within Iowa Location within the United States
- Location: 116 2nd Ave., W. Oskaloosa, Iowa
- Coordinates: 41°17′36″N 92°38′46″W
- Area: less than one acre
- Built: 1852
- Architectural style: Federal
- NRHP reference No.: 84001276
- Added to NRHP: March 22, 1984

The John H. Shoemake House, also known as the Shoemake-Muhl House, is a historic residence located in Oskaloosa, Iowa, United States. A native of Tennessee, Shoemake was a local businessman and local politician who settled in Mahaska County from Illinois in 1848. He had this two-story brick residence built in 1852 at a time when most houses in the area were built of wood. It follows the I-house plan, and it features Federal style elements that are found in the stepped gables, the massing of chimneys in pairs, and its overall symmetry. It was built with a flat roof, which was not unusual in Oskaloosa at the time. The gable roof was added sometime after 1869. The house was listed on the National Register of Historic Places in 1984.
