= Pierson–Betts House =

Historic house in Iowa, United States

- U.S. National Register of Historic Places
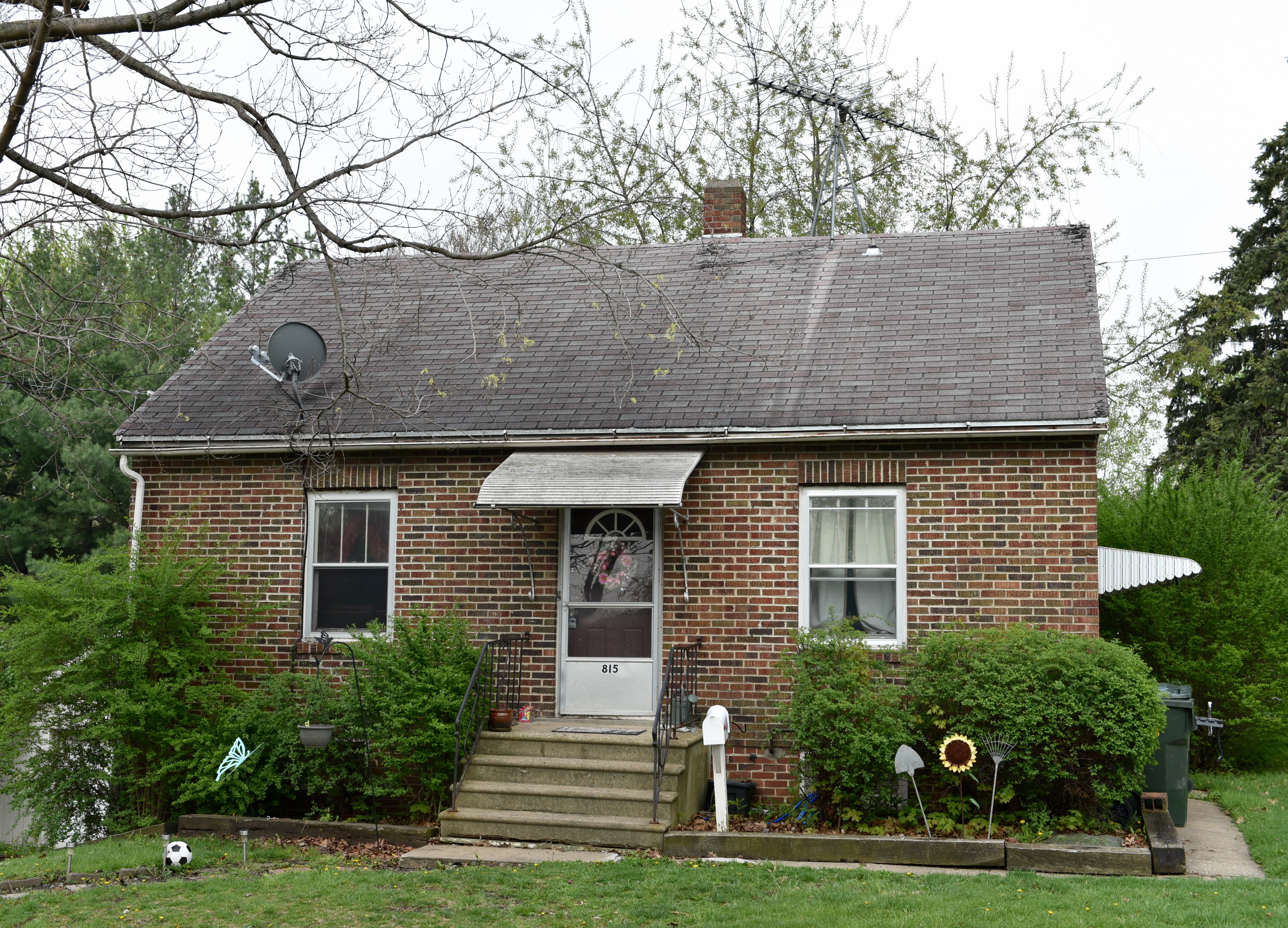

- Location within Iowa Location within the United States
- Location: 815 Penn Blvd. Oskaloosa, Iowa
- Coordinates: 41°18′23″N 92°38′49″W
- Area: less than one acre
- Architectural style: Colonial Revival
- MPS: Quaker Testimony in Oskaloosa MPS
- NRHP reference No.: 96000347
- Added to NRHP: March 28, 1996

The Pierson–Betts House is a historic residence located in Oskaloosa, Iowa, United States. The house was built by Lewis B. Pierson, the long-time Superintendent of Buildings and Grounds for William Penn College. He built this modest, single-story, brick house in the 1930s as a place that he and his wife Lilly could retire. Instead of moving in, they sold the house to Laura Betts who was the librarian at Penn from 1937 to 1942. She was one of the few single females employed by the college at that time who could afford to buy a house of her own. It is believed she could do so only with financial help from her elderly mother who moved in with her. After Betts moved out, other Penn faculty lived here. It is Pierson's and Betts' association with the college in the context of the Quaker testimony in Oskaloosa that makes this house historic. It was listed on the National Register of Historic Places in 1996.
