= Smith–Johnson House =

Historic house in Iowa, United States

- U.S. National Register of Historic Places
- U.S. Historic district – Contributing property
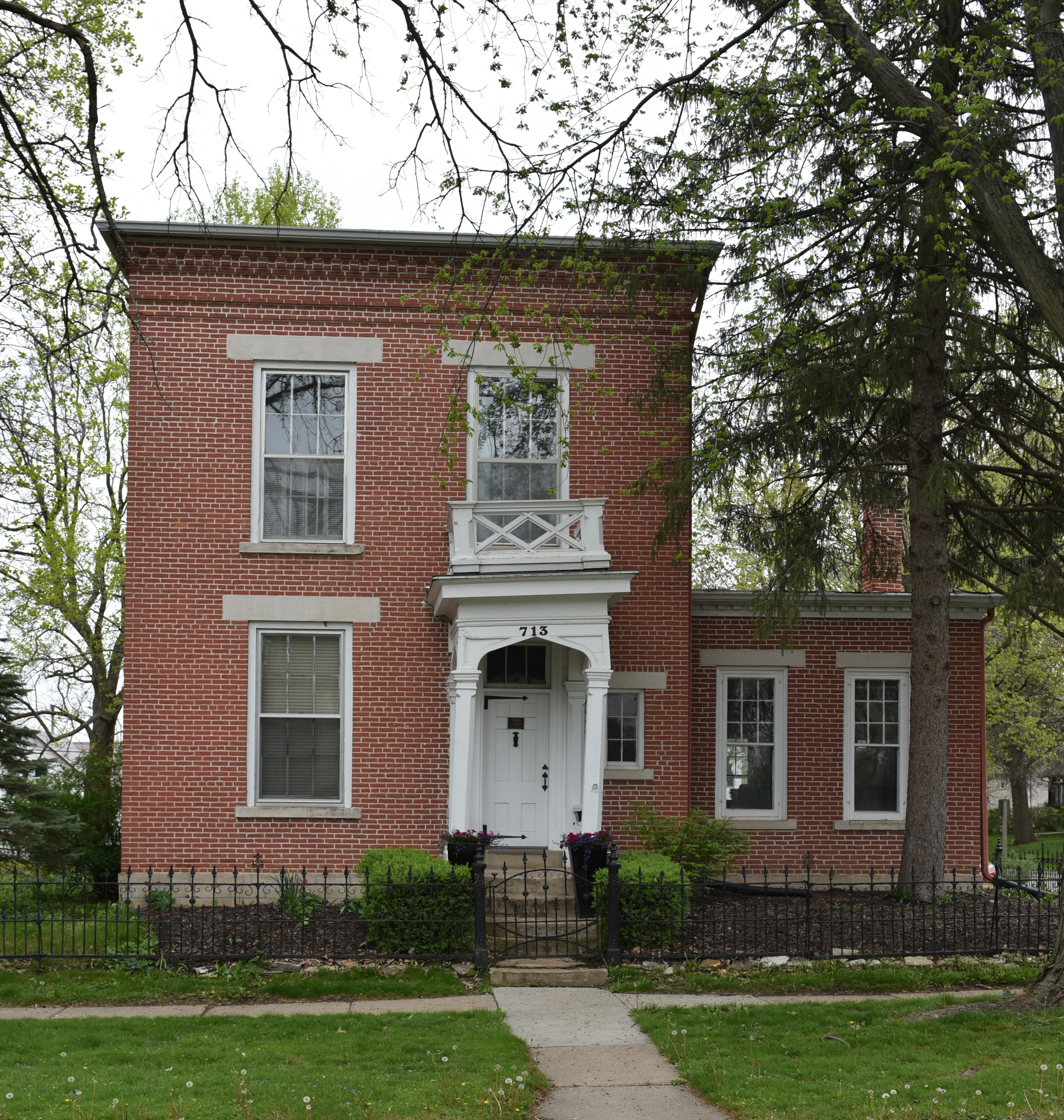

- Location within Iowa Location within the United States
- Location: 713 High Ave., E. Oskaloosa, Iowa
- Coordinates: 41°17′44″N 92°38′13″W
- Area: less than one acre
- Built: 1853
- Architectural style: Vernacular
- Part of: Paradise Block Historic District (ID91001767)
- NRHP reference No.: 77000538
- Added to NRHP: November 9, 1977

The Smith–Johnson House, also known as The Old Brick, is a historic residence located in Oskaloosa, Iowa, United States. It was built for William T. Smith in 1853, the same year he was elected as the first mayor of Oskaloosa. A lawyer, Smith was a native of Pennsylvania who settled in the town in 1848 and became county attorney the same year. In addition to his political and legal responsibilities he founded the first bank in town, and he was involved with other profitable financial ventures. He lived in the house until 1865 when Abijah Johnson, a Quaker merchant who moved to Oskaloosa to be a part of the flourishing Quaker communities here and in the surrounding areas. John Kelly Johnson, an attorney who served in the Iowa Senate, took over the house after his father's death in 1894.

The house follows no particular architectural style, but is an unusual expression of vernacular architecture. It is composed of three blocks of varying heights. The interior features four different floor levels, with steps that lead up or down among the first floor rooms. The house was individually listed on the National Register of Historic Places in 1977. It was included as a contributing property in the Paradise Block Historic District in 1991.
