= Dr. William H. and Mae R. Klose House =

Historic house in Iowa, United States

- U.S. National Register of Historic Places
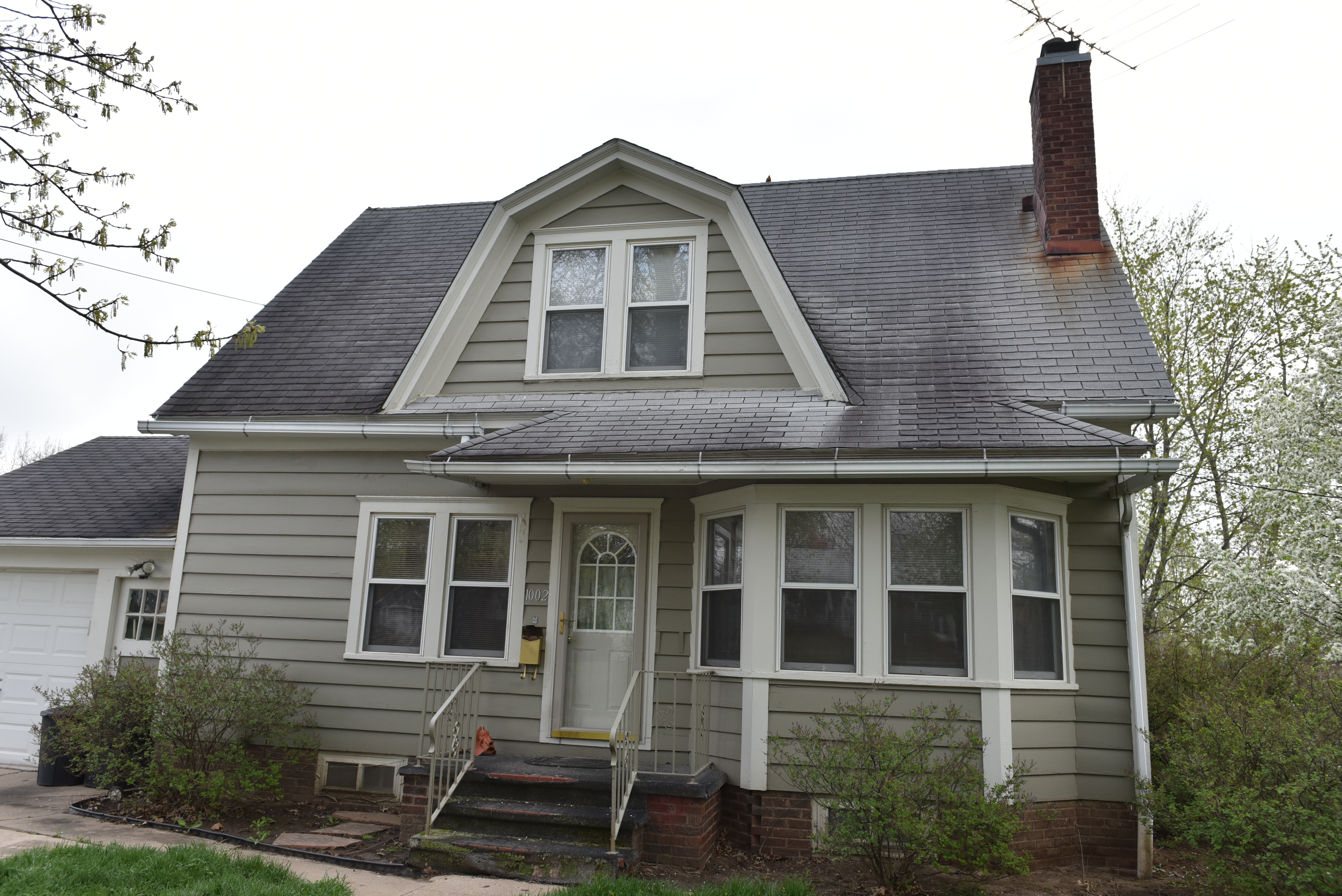

- Location within Iowa Location within the United States
- Location: 307 College Ave. Oskaloosa, Iowa
- Coordinates: 41°18′23″N 92°38′52″W
- Area: less than one acre
- Built: 1924
- Architectural style: Colonial Revival
- MPS: Quaker Testimony in Oskaloosa MPS
- NRHP reference No.: 96000350
- Added to NRHP: March 29, 1996

The Dr. William H. and Mae R. Klose House is a historic residence located in Oskaloosa, Iowa, United States. Dr. Klose taught German at nearby William Penn College, and was one of the longer serving faculty members. His dedication to the school helped it survive through its years of turmoil. They were also among the first to settle in the Penn College Addition. The college platted and sold these lots, which in turn helped the institution financially survive. This Colonial Revival style house is a 1½-story, frame, single-family dwelling. It features a side-gable roof, a facade gambrel dormer, and a bay window to the right to the main entry. It is the Klose's association with the school in the context of the Quaker testimony in Oskaloosa that makes this house historic. It was listed on the National Register of Historic Places in 1996.
