= Ulysses S. Grant School (Washington, D.C.) =

- U.S. National Register of Historic Places
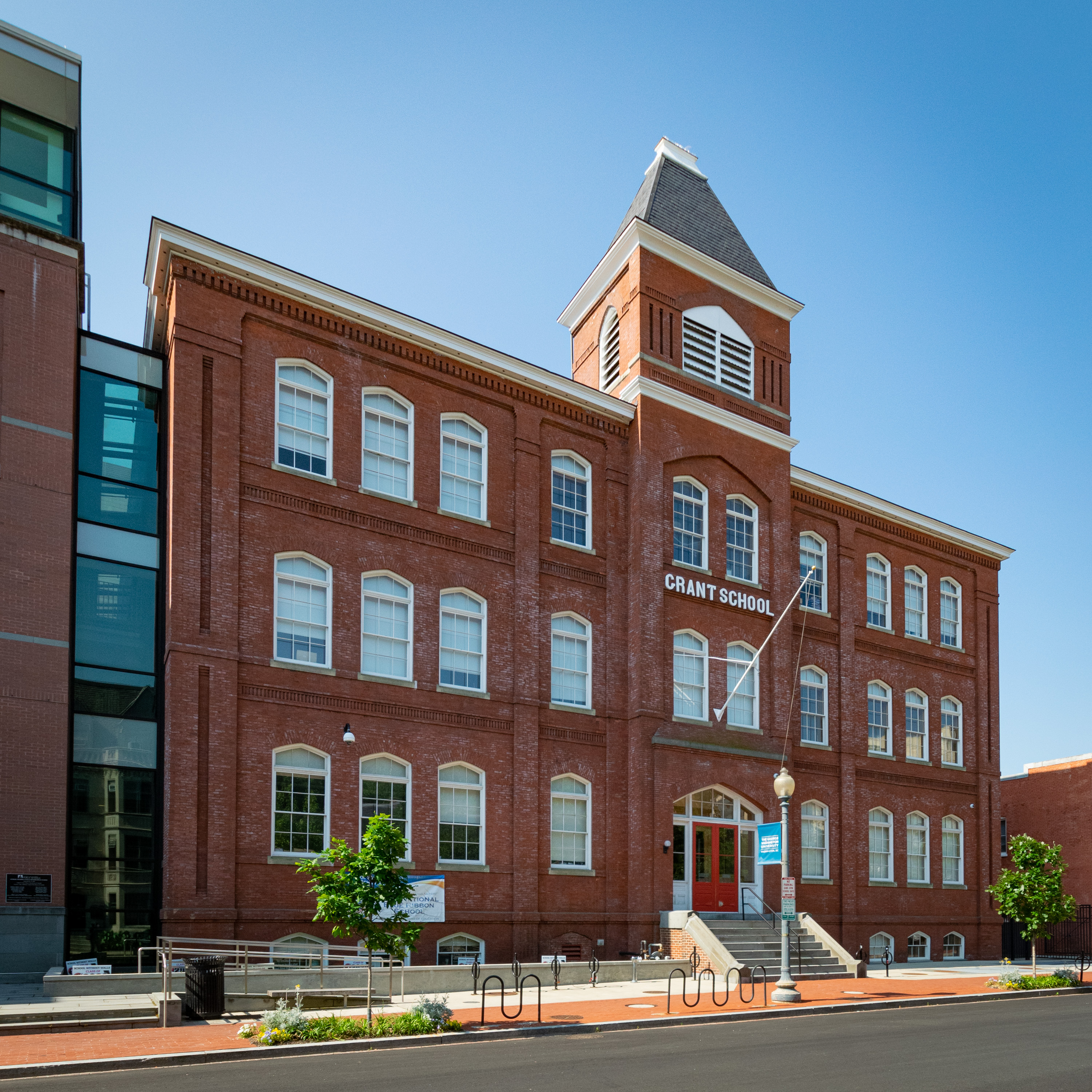

- Location within Central Washington, D.C. Location within the District of Columbia Location within the United States
- Location: NW., Washington, D.C.
- Coordinates: 38°53′53.52″N 77°2′52.8″W
- Built: 1882
- Architect: John B. Brady
- Architectural style: Late Victorian
- NRHP reference No.: 07000447
- Added to NRHP: May 22, 2007

The Ulysses S. Grant School is an historic high school, the home of the School Without Walls (Washington, D.C.). It is located at 2130 G Street Northwest, Washington, D.C., in the Foggy Bottom neighborhood.

== History ==
The Late Victorian building was designed by John B. Brady in 1882, and is listed on the National Register of Historic Places. On February 13, 2006, the D.C. City Council and the George Washington University Board of Trustees approved a deal for $12 million to renovate and expand the school building, in exchange for transfer of the school's rear parking lot property to the university.
