= Rose Hill Methodist Episcopal Church =

- U.S. National Register of Historic Places
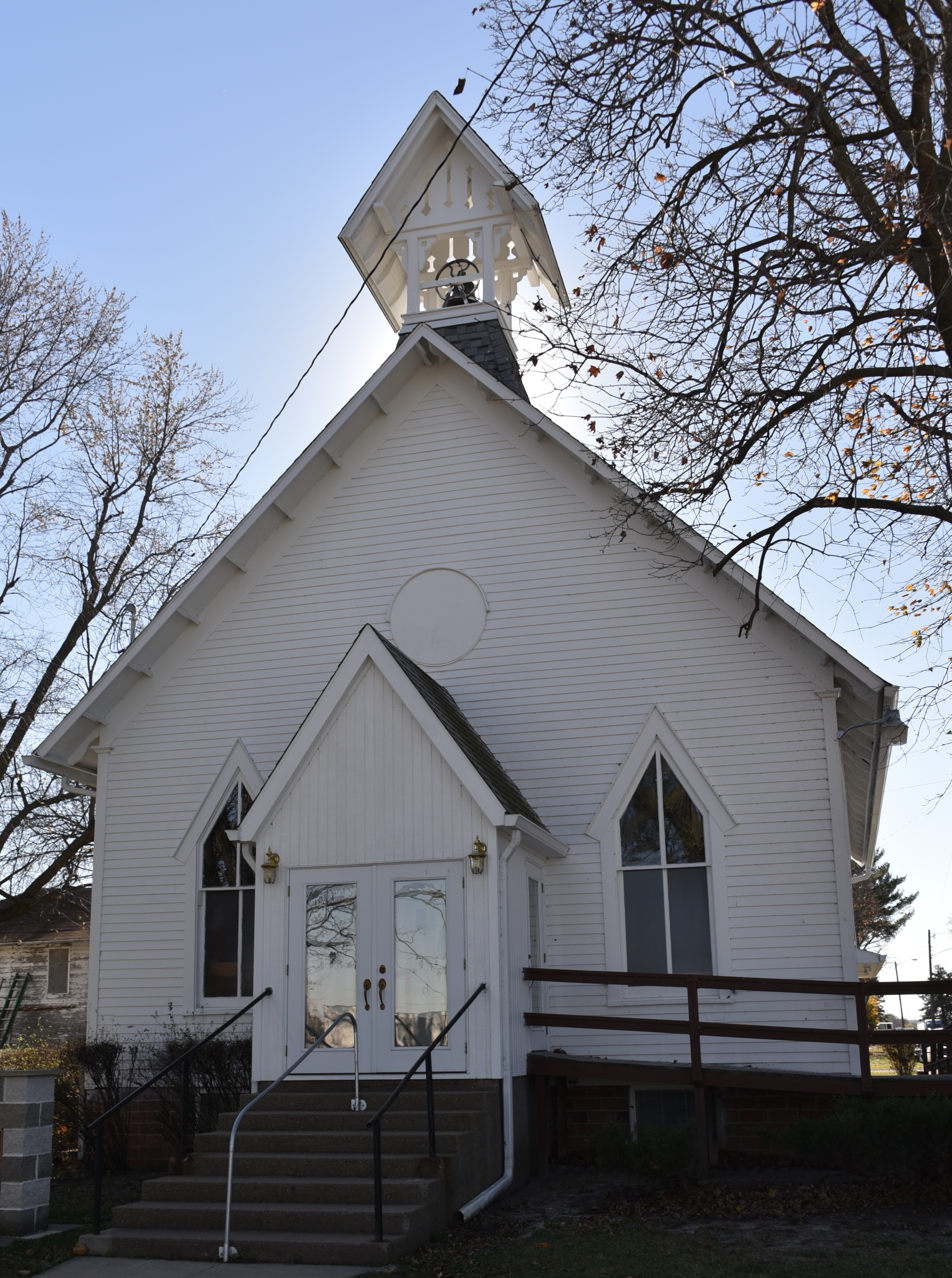

- Location within Iowa Location within the United States
- Location: 304 Main St. Rose Hill, Iowa
- Coordinates: 41°19′14″N 92°27′55″W
- Built: 1897
- Architectural style: Gothic Revival
- NRHP reference No.: 03000201
- Added to NRHP: April 11, 2003

The Rose Hill Methodist Episcopal Church is a historic building located in Rose Hill, Iowa, United States. The frame building was built in 1879 in the Gothic Revival style. It is the only 19th-century church building that remains in its original location in the town. The pointed arch windows are all at 45 degree angles, demonstrating the limited carpentry experience of the church members who built the structure. It was listed on the National Register of Historic Places in 2003.
