= Rose Hill, Iowa =

- City
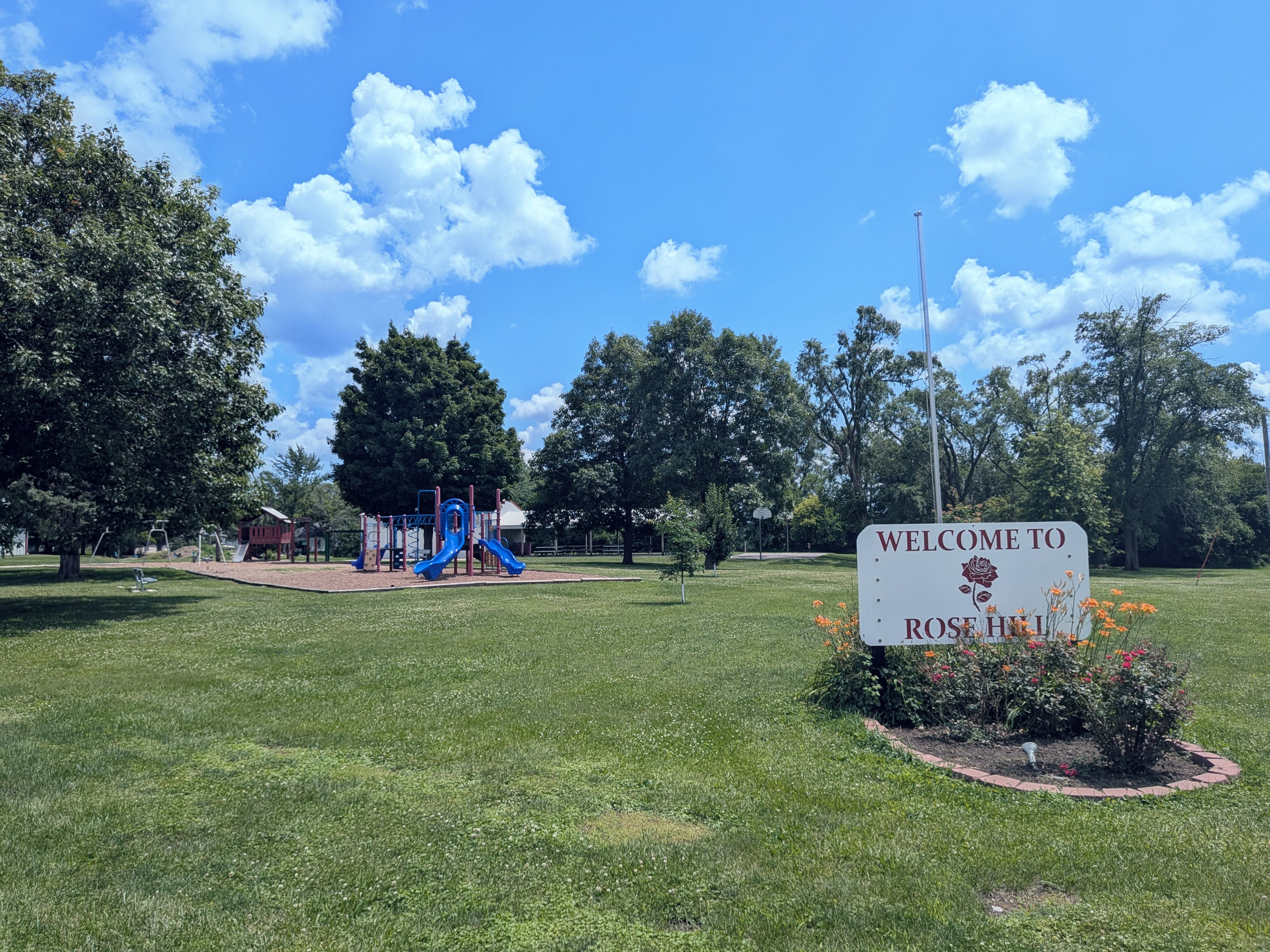
- Welcome sign and city park

- Location of Rose Hill, Iowa
- Coordinates: 41°19′13″N 92°27′49″W
- Country: United States
- State: Iowa
- County: Mahaska

Area
  - Total: 0.14 sq mi (0.37 km^{2})
  - Land: 0.14 sq mi (0.37 km^{2})
  - Water: 0 sq mi (0.00 km^{2})
- Elevation: 810 ft (250 m)

Population (2020)
  - Total: 157
  - Density: 1,104.3/sq mi (426.37/km^{2})
- Time zone: UTC-6 (Central (CST))
  - Summer (DST): UTC-5 (CDT)
- ZIP code: 52586
- Area code: 641
- FIPS code: 19-68700
- GNIS feature ID: 2396428

Rose Hill is a city in Mahaska County, Iowa, United States. The population was 157 at the time of the 2020 census.

== Geography ==
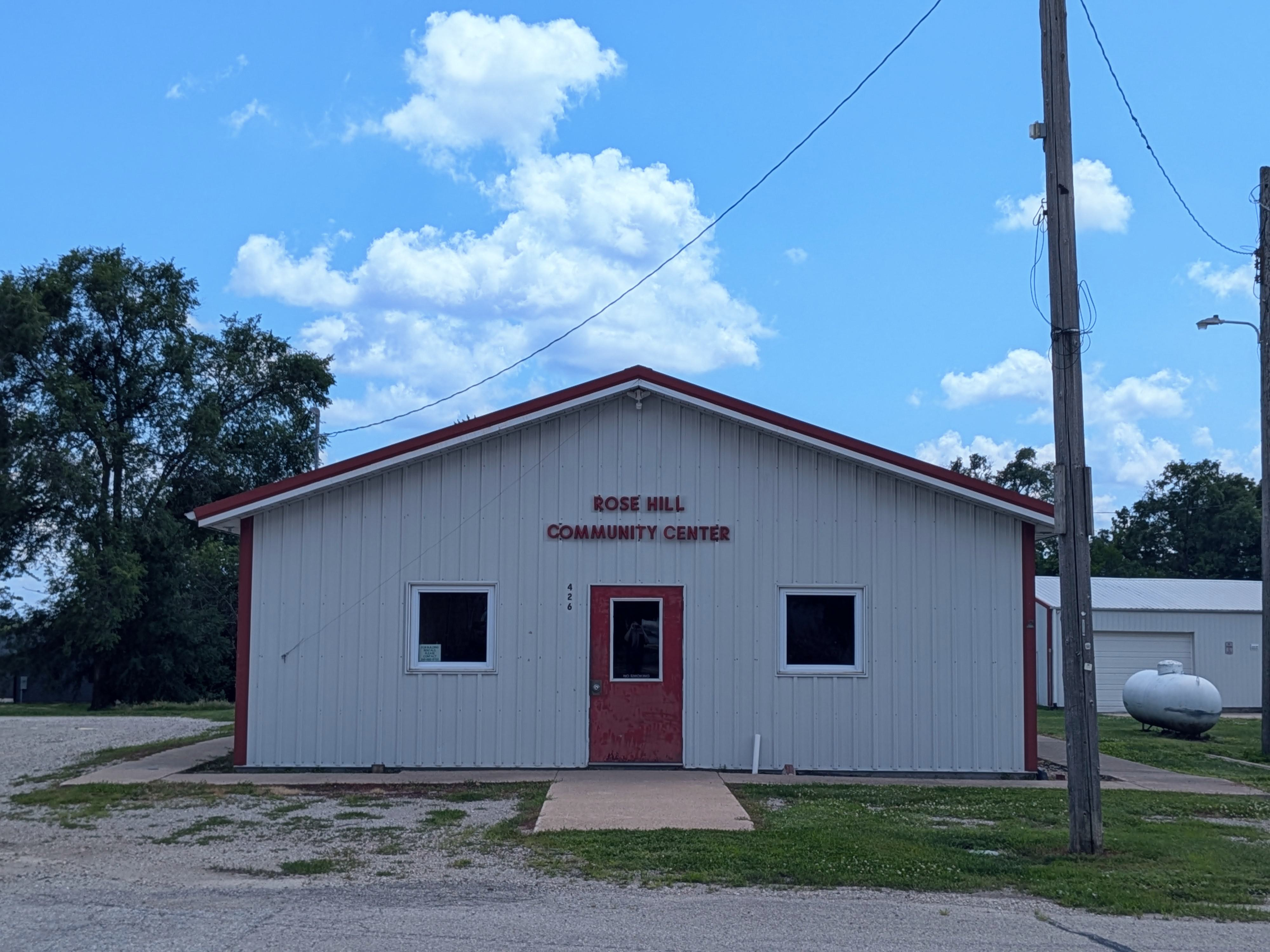
Community Center

According to the United States Census Bureau, the city has a total area of 0.14 square miles (0.36 km^{2}), all of it land.

== Demographics ==
Historical populations
Year	Pop.	±%
1880	199	—
1890	200	+0.5%
1900	253	+26.5%
1910	269	+6.3%
1920	260	−3.3%
1930	275	+5.8%
1940	269	−2.2%
1950	243	−9.7%
1960	223	−8.2%
1970	192	−13.9%
1980	214	+11.5%
1990	171	−20.1%
2000	205	+19.9%
2010	168	−18.0%
2020	157	−6.5%
Source:"U.S. Census website". United States Census Bureau. and Iowa Data Center; Source: U.S. Decennial Census

=== 2020 census ===
As of the census of 2020, there were 157 people, 70 households, and 48 families residing in the city. The population density was 1,104.3 inhabitants per square mile (426.4/km^{2}). There were 72 housing units at an average density of 506.4 per square mile (195.5/km^{2}). The racial makeup of the city was 98.7% White, 0.0% Black or African American, 0.0% Native American, 0.0% Asian, 0.0% Pacific Islander, 0.0% from other races and 1.3% from two or more races. Hispanic or Latino persons of any race comprised 0.0% of the population.

Of the 70 households, 32.9% of which had children under the age of 18 living with them, 48.6% were married couples living together, 11.4% were cohabitating couples, 18.6% had a female householder with no spouse or partner present and 21.4% had a male householder with no spouse or partner present. 31.4% of all households were non-families. 24.3% of all households were made up of individuals, 5.7% had someone living alone who was 65 years old or older.

The median age in the city was 46.3 years. 23.6% of the residents were under the age of 20; 5.7% were between the ages of 20 and 24; 19.1% were from 25 and 44; 30.6% were from 45 and 64; and 21.0% were 65 years of age or older. The gender makeup of the city was 51.6% male and 48.4% female.

=== 2010 census ===
As of the census of 2010, there were 168 people, 72 households, and 47 families living in the city. The population density was 1,200.0 inhabitants per square mile (463.3/km^{2}). There were 85 housing units at an average density of 607.1 per square mile (234.4/km^{2}). The racial makeup of the city was 98.2% White, 0.6% Asian, and 1.2% from two or more races.

There were 72 households, of which 27.8% had children under the age of 18 living with them, 51.4% were married couples living together, 9.7% had a female householder with no husband present, 4.2% had a male householder with no wife present, and 34.7% were non-families. 23.6% of all households were made up of individuals, and 1.4% had someone living alone who was 65 years of age or older. The average household size was 2.33 and the average family size was 2.70.

The median age in the city was 42.4 years. 21.4% of residents were under the age of 18; 6.6% were between the ages of 18 and 24; 25% were from 25 to 44; 35.7% were from 45 to 64; and 11.3% were 65 years of age or older. The gender makeup of the city was 54.2% male and 45.8% female.

=== 2000 census ===
As of the census of 2000, there were 205 people, 82 households, and 56 families living in the city. The population density was 1,501.9 inhabitants per square mile (579.9/km^{2}). There were 91 housing units at an average density of 666.7 per square mile (257.4/km^{2}). The racial makeup of the city was 96.10% White, 0.49% Native American, 0.49% from other races, and 2.93% from two or more races. Hispanic or Latino of any race were 1.95% of the population.

There were 82 households, out of which 32.9% had children under the age of 18 living with them, 52.4% were married couples living together, 9.8% had a female householder with no husband present, and 31.7% were non-families. 25.6% of all households were made up of individuals, and 3.7% had someone living alone who was 65 years of age or older. The average household size was 2.50 and the average family size was 3.00.

In the city, the population was spread out, with 26.3% under the age of 18, 9.8% from 18 to 24, 34.6% from 25 to 44, 19.5% from 45 to 64, and 9.8% who were 65 years of age or older. The median age was 34 years. For every 100 females, there were 111.3 males. For every 100 females age 18 and over, there were 104.1 males.

The median income for a household in the city was $30,469, and the median income for a family was $32,143. Males had a median income of $30,357 versus $18,125 for females. The per capita income for the city was $21,298. About 16.0% of families and 14.0% of the population were below the poverty line, including 6.5% of those under the age of eighteen and 17.2% of those 65 or over.

== See also ==
- Rose Hill Methodist Episcopal Church, listed on the National Register of Historic Places
