= Ulysses Simpson Grant Elementary School =

- Ulysses Simpson Grant; Elementary School
- U.S. National Register of Historic Places
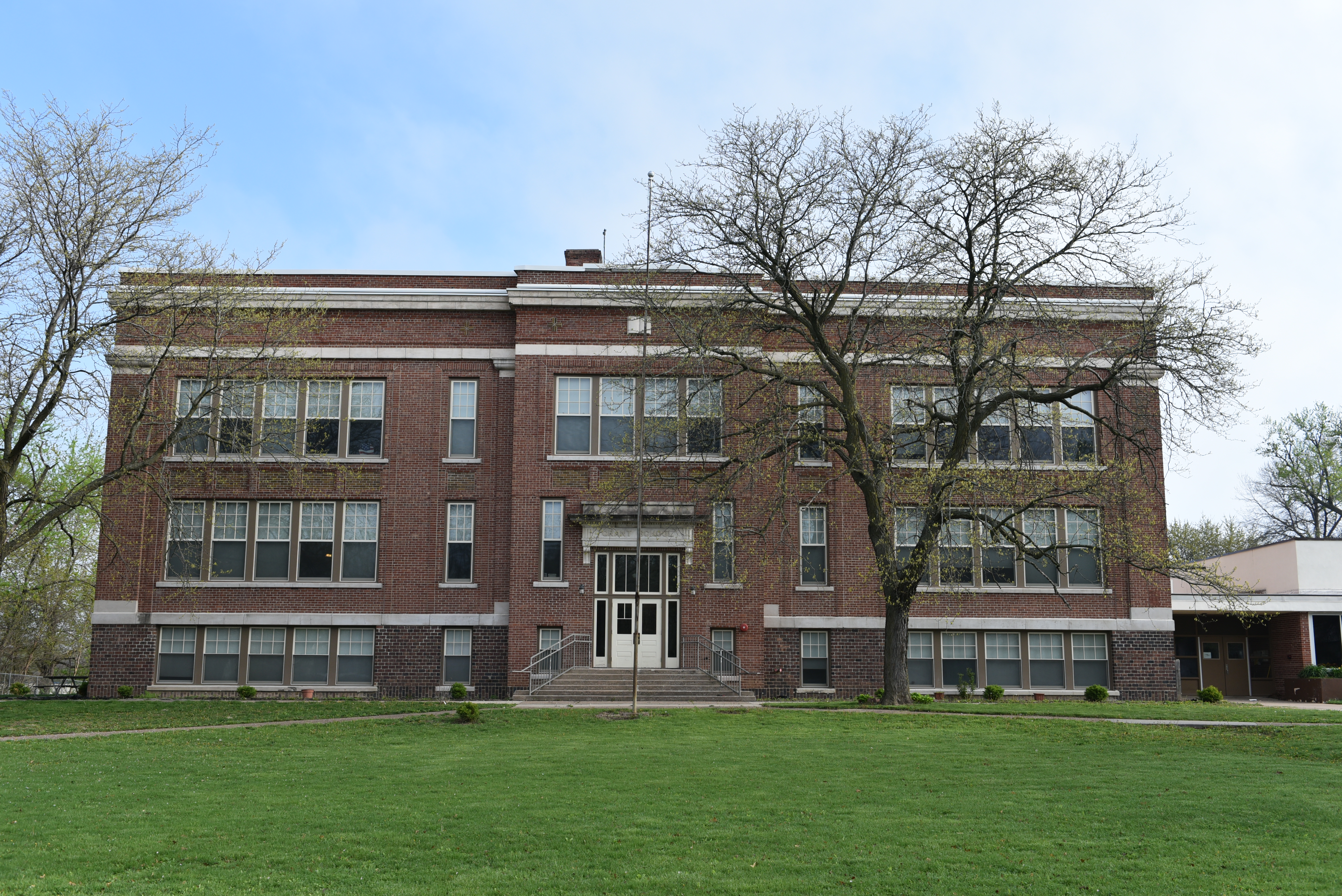

- Location within Iowa Location within the United States
- Location: 911 B Ave. W. Oskaloosa, Iowa
- Coordinates: 41°17′52″N 92°38′13″W
- Area: 3 acres (1.2 ha)
- Built: 1914
- Built by: Buckler and Robertson; Garden Construction Company
- Architect: John W. Trafzer; George Russell
- Architectural style: Classical Revival
- NRHP reference No.: 08001163
- Added to NRHP: December 10, 2008

Ulysses Simpson Grant Elementary School is a historic building located in Oskaloosa, Iowa, United States. Built in 1914, it replaced a school of the same name that had been built in 1876. The Neoclassical building was designed by Des Moines architect John W. Trafzer, and built by Buckler and Robertson. It was the first new school built in Oskaloosa in the 20th century, and part of an effort to rebuild or recondition the schools in the city. The addition of a multipurpose facility in 1957 followed the Mother's Crusade of 1956 to rebuild and modernize Oskaloosa schools system after World War II. It was designed by George Russell. Two other additions were built in 1978 and 1980. The building served the school system until 2004, after which the original portion of the building was converted into senior apartments and the newer additions into a senior center. The grounds have become a community park. The building was listed on the National Register of Historic Places in 2008.
