= Stock Judging Pavilion (Oskaloosa, Iowa) =

- U.S. National Register of Historic Places
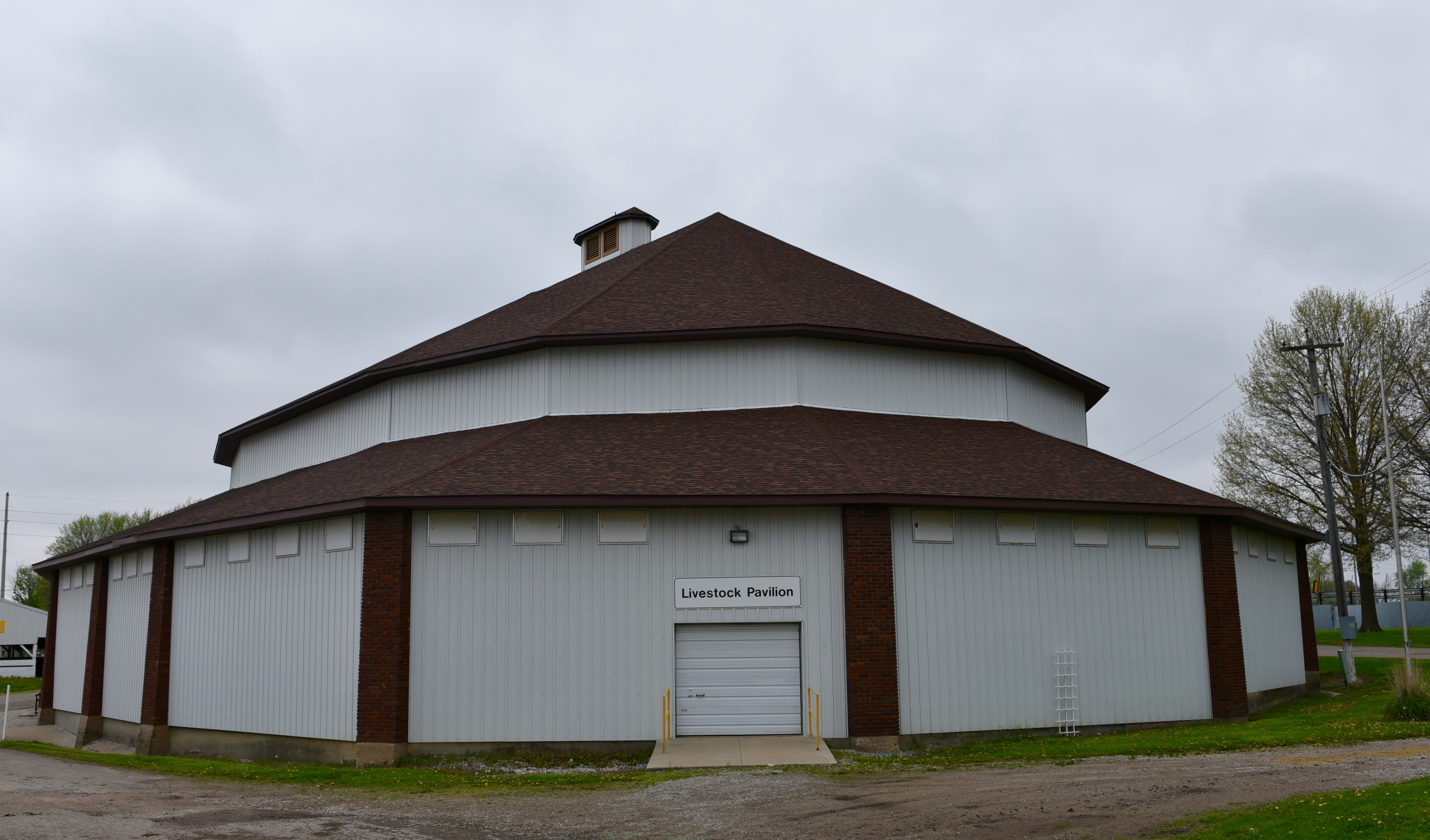

- Location within Iowa Location within the United States
- Location: Southern Iowa Fairgrounds; Oskaloosa, Iowa
- Coordinates: 41°18′04″N 92°39′32″W
- Area: 31,000 square feet (2,900 m^{2})
- Built: 1919
- Built by: P.W. Sparks
- NRHP reference No.: 84001280
- Added to NRHP: April 12, 1984

The Stock Judging Pavilion is a historic building located in Oskaloosa, Iowa, United States. The facility on the Southern Iowa Fairgrounds was built in 1919 by P.W. Sparks, a prominent local contractor. It is believed he designed the building as well. It is one of several structures built at the grounds around the same time. In 1919 the Southern Iowa Fair was the second largest fair in the state after the Iowa State Fair. The pavilion originally had a double monitor roof. The upper monitor was removed sometime before 1945. The building was listed on the National Register of Historic Places in 1984.
