= Iowa's 19th Senate district =

American legislative district

Iowa's 19th State Senate district
Senator
| Ken Rozenboom; R |

The 19th District of the Iowa Senate is located in south-central Iowa, and is currently composed of Jasper County, as well as part of Marion and Mahaska Counties.

== Current elected officials ==
Ken Rozenboom is the senator currently representing the 19th District.

The area of the 19th District contains two Iowa House of Representatives districts:

- The 37th District (represented by Barb Kniff McCulla)
- The 38th District (represented by Jon Dunwell)

The district is also located in Iowa's 1st congressional district, which is represented by Mariannette Miller-Meeks.

== List of representatives ==
| Representative | Party | Dates | Residence | Notes |
|---|---|---|---|---|
| George D. Crosthwait | Whig | 1852-1854 | Iowa City, Iowa | Senator Crosthwait resigned his post to emigrate to California in 1854. |
| Samuel Workman | Democrat | 1854-1855 | Johnson County, Iowa | |
| George W. Wilkinson | Know Nothing Party | 1856-1857 | Muscatine County, Iowa | |
| Andrew Oliphant Patterson | Democrat | 1858-1859 | Muscatine, Iowa | Senator Patterson resigned his post in 1859 when he emigrated to Colorado. |
| John W. Thompson | Republican | 1860-1861 | Davenport, Iowa | |
| Benjamin F. Gue | Republican | 1862-1863 | Scott County, Iowa | |
| Joseph B. Leake | Republican | 1860-1862 | Davenport, Iowa | |
| Thomas McMillan | Republican | 1863-1869 | Marion County, Iowa | |
| John M. Cathcart | Republican | 1870-1871 | Marion County, Iowa | |
| John L. McCormack | Democrat | 1872-1877 | Knoxville, Iowa | |
| George Franklin Wright | Republican | 1878-1883 | Council Bluffs, Iowa | |
| George Carson | Republican | 1884-1887 | Council Bluffs, Iowa | |
| William Groneweg | Democrat | 1888-1895 | Council Bluffs, Iowa | |
| Nathan Marsh Pusey | Republican | 1896-1899 | Council Bluffs, Iowa | |
| Arthur Sargent Hazelton | Republican | 1900-1903 | Council Bluffs, Iowa | |
| Charles George Saunders | Republican | 1904-1912 | Council Bluffs, Iowa | |
| Mack C. Goodwin | Democrat | 1913-1914 | Council Bluffs, Iowa | |
| Clement F. Kimball | Republican | 1917-1920 | Council Bluffs, Iowa | |
| William Samuel Baird | Republican | 1921-1932 | Council Bluffs, Iowa | |
| Morris W. Moore | Democrat | 1933-1940 | Council Bluffs, Iowa | |
| De Vere Watson | Republican | 1941-1956 | Council Bluffs, Iowa | |
| Jim O. Henry | Republican | 1957-1960 | Council Bluffs, Iowa | |
| Richard C. Turner | Republican | 1961-1964 | Council Bluffs, Iowa | |
| Howard Tabor | Democrat | 1965-1966 | Baldwin, Iowa | |
| Eugene Marshall Hill | Democrat | 1967-1970 | Newton, Iowa | |
| Francis L. Messerly | Republican | 1971-1973 | Cedar Falls, Iowa | |
| Vernon H. Kyhl | Republican | 1973 | Cedar Falls, Iowa | Senator Kyhl died in office in 1973. |
| Clifford Earl Burroughs | Republican | 1974-1978 | Butler County, Iowa | |
| John W. Jensen | Republican | 1979-1982 | Bremer County, Iowa | |
| Norman J. Goodwin | Republican | 1983-1990 | Dewitt, Iowa | |
| Sheldon L. Rittmer | Republican | 1991-2002 | Clinton, Iowa | |
| Charles W. Larson | Republican | 2003-2006 | Cedar Rapids, Iowa | |
| Robert M. Hogg | Democrat | 2007-2012 | Cedar Rapids, Iowa | |
| Jack Whitver | Republican | 2013-2022 | Ankeny, Iowa | |
| Ken Rozenboom | Republican | 2023-Present | Oskaloosa, Iowa | |

== Historical district boundaries ==
| Map | Description | Years effective | Notes |
|---|---|---|---|
| | Iowa County Johnson County; Poweshiek County | 1852-1855 | From 1846 to 1857, district numbering was not utilized by the Iowa State Legislature. This convention was added with the passing of the 1857 Iowa Constitution. Numbering of districts pre-1857 is done as a matter of historic convenience. |
| | Muscatine County | 1856-1859 | |
| | Scott County | 1860-1863 | |
| | Marion County | 1864-1877 | |
| | Pottawattamie County | 1878-1962 | |
| | Jackson County Jones County | 1963-1966 | |
| | Jasper County | 1967-1970 | |
| | Black Hawk County (partial) | 1971-1972 | In 1970, the Iowa Legislature passed an amendment to the Iowa Constitution setting forth the rules for legislative redistricting in order to abide by the rules established by the Reynolds v. Sims Supreme Court case. The first reapportionment map created by the Republican controlled legislature was deemed unconstitutional, but was still used for the 1970 election. |
| | Black Hawk County (partial) Bremer County (partial); Butler County Floyd County (partial); Franklin County (partial); Grundy County (partial); Marshall County (partial); Tama County (partial) | 1973-1982 | |
| | Cedar County (partial) Clinton County | 1983-1992 | |
| | Clinton County (partial) Scott County (partial) | 1993-2002 | |
| | Linn County (partial): Cedar Rapids (partial); Portions of the city North and East of the Cedar River excluding downtown. | 2003-2012 | |
| | Polk County (partial): Crocker Township; Delaware Township; Douglas Township; Lincoln Township; Saylor Township; Alleman; Ankeny; Saylorville | 2013-2022 | |
| | Jasper County Mahaska County (partial): Black Oak Township; East Des Moines Township; Garfield Township; Jefferson Township; Richland Township; Scott Township; West Des Moines Township; Beacon; Marion County (partial): Excluding; Franklin Township; Knoxville Township; Union Township; Knoxville | 2023-Present | |

== See also ==
- Iowa General Assembly
- Iowa Senate
