= List of Iowa placenames of Native American origin =

The following list includes settlements, geographic features, and political subdivisions of Iowa whose names are derived from Native American languages.

== Listings ==
=== State ===
- Iowa – from Lakota ayúhwa, via French Aiouez.

=== Counties ===
- Allamakee County
- Appanoose County
- Cherokee County – named after the Cherokee people.
  - City of Cherokee
- Chickasaw County – named after the Chickasaw people.
- Keokuk County – named after the Sauk chief Keokuk.
  - City of Keokuk
- Mahaska County
- Muscatine County
- Osceola County – named after the Seminole leader Osceola
  - City of Osceola
- Pocahontas County
- Pottawattamie County
- Poweshiek County
- Sac County – named after the Sac/Sauk and Fox people.
  - City of Sac City, Iowa
- Sioux County – named after the Sioux nation.
  - Sioux City
  - City of Little Sioux, Iowa
  - Big Sioux River
  - Little Sioux River
- Tama County
- Wapello County – named after Wapello, a Meskwaki chief
- Winnebago County
  - Winnebago River
- Winneshiek County

=== Communities ===
- Iowa City
  - Iowa River
  - Upper Iowa River
- Algona
- Anamosa – named after the legend of a local Native American girl
- Battle Creek – named for a skirmish between Native American tribes near the stream.
- Camanche, named after the Camanche
- Chillicothe
- Coon Rapids
  - Coon Creek
- Dakota City
- Decorah
- Hiawatha
- Jamaica
- Kanawha
- Keomah Village
  - Lake Keomah
  - Lake Keomah State Park
- Keosauqua – named after the Meskwaki and Sauk name for the Des Moines River.
- Keota
- Lakota
- Lehigh
- Maquoketa
  - Maquoketa Caves State Park
- Ocheyedan
  - Ocheyedan River
- Pocahontas
- Sac City

=== Bodies of water ===
- Canoe Creek
- Ioway Creek
- Kanaranzi Creek
- Maquoketa River
  - Little Maquoketa River
- Mississippi River
- Missouri River
- Nishnabotna River
- Nodaway River
- Raccoon River
- Wapsipinicon River

== See also ==
- List of place names in the United States of Native American origin
