= World Gospel Mission =

Christian organization

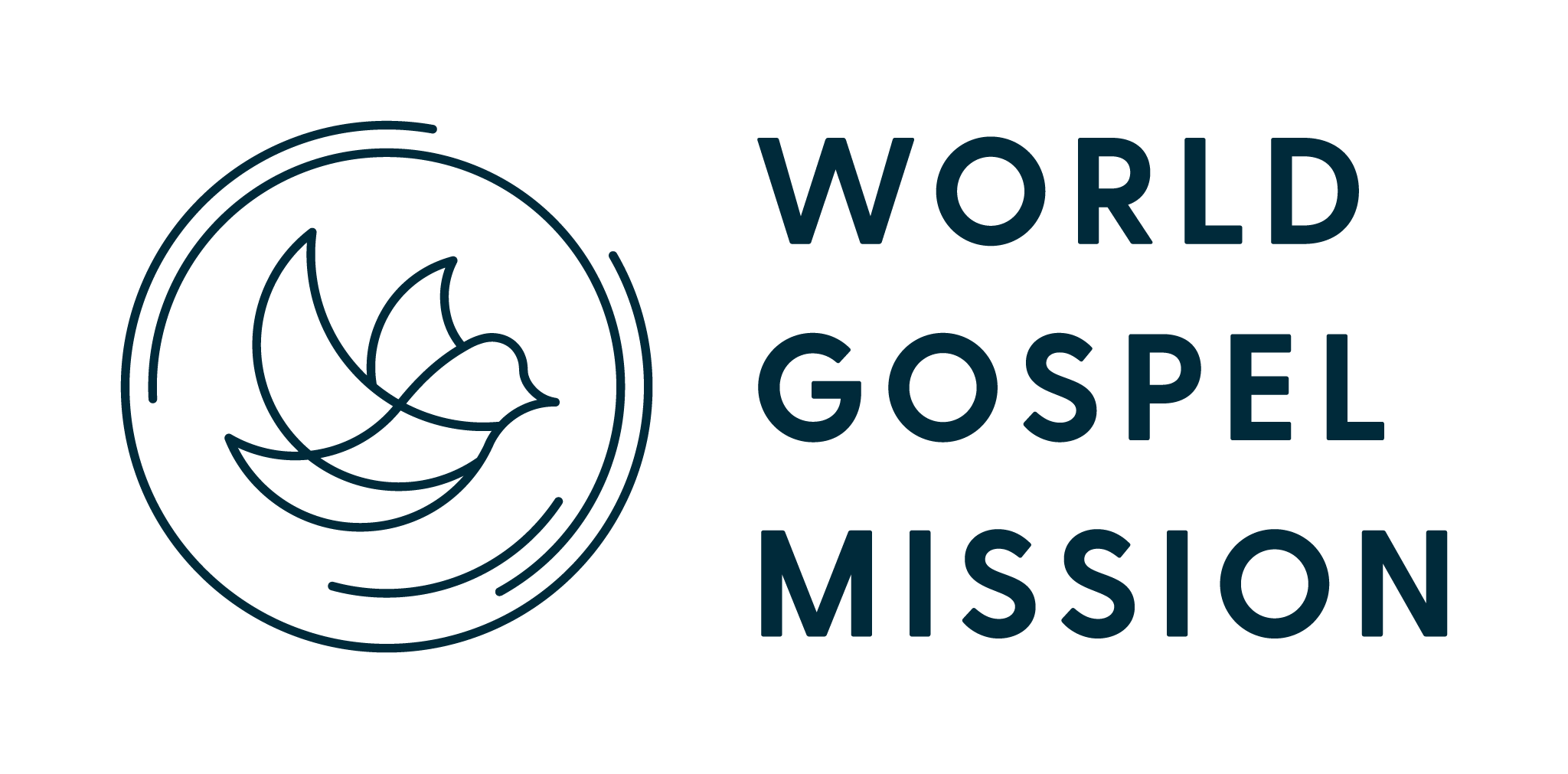
- WGM logo
- Formation: June 10, 1910
- Founded: July 10, 1910
- Type: Christian non-profit organization
- Location: Marion, IN 46952 United States
- Region served: 38 Countries
- Key people: Dan Schafer (President)
- Revenue: US$30,785,926 (2024)
- Website: wgm.org

World Gospel Mission (WGM) is an interdenominational Christian missionary agency headquartered in Marion, Indiana, United States. Aligned with the Wesleyan-Holiness tradition (Methodist) of Protestantism, WGM was founded on 10 June 1910 in University Park, Iowa as the Missionary Department of the National Association for the Promotion of Holiness. Various Free Methodist, Global Methodist, Nazarene, and Wesleyan congregations, among others, support the World Gospel Mission. As of 2018, WGM operates in 23 countries and supports 236 full-time missionaries, in addition to short-term team members and volunteers.

== About ==
World Gospel Mission uses the faith mission approach. Therefore, all missionaries (short-term or long-term) and volunteers with WGM are responsible for raising their own financial support with the help of the organization. Missionaries raise the funds needed to pay for salaries, housing, medical and life insurance, children’s educations, and retirement.

WGM is a charter member of the Evangelical Council for Financial Accountability (ECFA) and is affiliated with the Evangelical Fellowship of Missions Agencies (EFMA), the Standards of Excellence in Short-Term Mission, Samaritan’s Purse, and several other non-profits.

WGM’s areas of service include church ministries, children’s and youth ministries, educational ministries, medical ministries, support ministries, sports ministries, and humanitarian ministries.

Along with mobilizing volunteers and missionaries, WGM provides a list of Projects, which are crowdfunded opportunities that correspond to needs in specific locations.

== History ==
At the instigation of Mrs. Iva May Durham Vennard (1871–1945), a Methodist evangelist and later founder and first president of the Chicago Evangelistic Institute (now Vennard College), and the support of Holiness Association president, Rev. Charles J. Fowler, the Missionary Department of the National Association for the Promotion of Holiness was established at University Park, Iowa on 10 June 1910, with the specific purpose of "spreading scriptural holiness to the ends of the earth." Rev. Cecil Warren Troxel and his wife, Ellen Armour Troxel (born 1875), and the Rev. Woodford Taylor and his wife, Mrs. Harriet Armour Taylor, members of the Free Methodist Church of North America, became the first missionaries in China with the Missionary Department of the National Association for the Promotion of Holiness, directly under the Christian Holiness Association (now Christian Holiness Partnership). WGM remained active primarily in China over the next decade, eventually expanding to other fields.

By 1919 the headquarters was located at 825 Woodbine Avenue, Oak Park, Illinois. After a number of moves in the Chicago area, the headquarters relocated permanently to Marion, Indiana in a former YMCA building at Fifth and Boots Street. In the same year, the first edition of WGM’s print magazine Call to Prayer (now The Call) was published as a bi-monthly subscription. The Call is still produced and available for free in print or digital form.

In 1926 the Mission became incorporated in Illinois as a separate legal entity from the National Holiness Association and was renamed as the Missionary Society for the Promotion of Holiness. The name was changed to World Gospel Mission in 1954.

By 1975, the headquarters had moved from downtown Marion to a newly built campus a few miles east, where it remains today.

== Programs ==
WGM offers short, mid, and long-term missions experiences.

Short-term

Short-term trips typically last between 1–2 weeks. Volunteers may go on short-term trips as a team, or individuals can join pre-planned team trips designated for certain locations.

Mid-term

Mid-term trips can last between 1–12 months. Volunteers choose a location of service based on need and their own ministry specialty.

Long-term

Long-term missionaries are on the field for 2 or more years. Long-term opportunities require a longer application process and more involved training.

== Locations ==
World Gospel Mission missionaries and volunteers are active in over 25 locations.

Africa

- Burundi
- Kenya
- South Sudan
- Uganda

Asia

- Cambodia
- India
- Japan

Europe

- Albania
- Czech Republic
- Hungary
- Spain

Middle East

- Unspecified

North/Central America

- American Indian Field
- Guatemala
- Haiti
- Honduras
- Mexico
- Stockton, CA
- Texas/Mexico Border
- USA Ministries

Oceania

- Papua New Guinea

South America

- Argentina
- Bolivia
- Paraguay
- Peru
