= Radio Cordac =

Radio station in Burundi

Radio Cordac (Corporation Radiodiffusion d'Afrique Central) was a well-known Protestant missionary radio service directed to listeners throughout Central Africa. Bob and Esther Kellum, along with Burundian preachers, began communications with the government in February to get a franchise, which was granted in September 1963. Transmissions were based in Bujumbura, Burundi. The station ran from around 1963 to 1977. In 1969, it was one of only two radio stations in the entire country, sending out broadcasts in French, English, Kirundi and Swahili. Radio Cordac went off the air in 1977 when the Burundi government decided to stop private radio stations and only allow government stations. The president at the time, decided no western missionaries could stay in the country.

== History ==
An American organisation by the name of Voice of Hope Radio aims to continue such broadcasts to Central Africa, provided they have sufficient funds to do so.

Radio Cordac was sponsored by World Gospel Mission, Kansas Society of Friends and the Free Methodists. In 1969, the radio station was staffed by 15 African and eight European workers.

The radio station operated a four-year training program for African students from its property in Bujumbura, Burundi. Students regularly participated in radio broadcasts.

During its operating life, Radio Cordac broadcast in English, French, Swahili, Kirundi, and other African dialects, to Burundi and five central African countries, Congo, Rwanda, Kenya, Tanzania and Uganda, with a potential listening audience of 10,000,000 at that time.

Short wave listeners could receive Radio Cordac signals as far away as Japan. In February 1973, Radio Cordac broadcast on 3985 kHz 75 meter band, 4920 kHz 60 meter band, 1400 kHz Medium Wave and 93.5 MHz FM Band. The call sign was 9UZ 23.

In a public address, given around 1975 by Corrie ten Boom, the renowned Dutch World War Two prison camp survivor and Christian speaker, said that she had visited and worked at the radio station in Bujumbura and was pleased to hear that it had reopened again, broadcasting 24 hours a day, after being closed down for two years as a result of changing political policy.

The 1976 Interval Signal for Radio Cordac can be heard on the Burundi page at www.intervalsignals.net.
