= Union Mills, Iowa =

- Unincorporated community
- Location within Iowa Location within the United States
- Coordinates: 41°27′09″N 92°34′15″W
- Country: United States
- State: Iowa
- County: Mahaska
- Elevation: 764 ft (233 m)
- Time zone: UTC-6 (Central (CST))
  - Summer (DST): UTC-5 (CDT)
- Area code: 641
- GNIS feature ID: 464781

Union Mills is an unincorporated community in Mahaska County, in the U.S. state of Iowa.

== Geography ==
Union Mills lies in sections 22 and 27 of Union Township. It lies at the junction of 135 Street and Parkin Avenue (County Road T65).

== History ==
A post office was established at Union Mills in 1848, and was discontinued in 1857. The post office was reestablished in 1863 and was discontinued in 1907; it was briefly known as Widow's Home.

The population of Union Mills was estimated at 50 in 1887, was 60 in 1902, and was 52 in 1925. The population was 30 in 1940.

== See also ==
- Lacey, Iowa
