= Indianapolis, Iowa =

- Unincorporated community
- Location within Iowa Location within the United States
- Coordinates: 41°23′49″N 92°26′01″W
- Country: United States
- State: Iowa
- County: Mahaska
- Established: 1849

Area
  - Land: 3.02 sq mi (7.8 km^{2})
- Elevation: 794 ft (242 m)
- Time zone: UTC-6 (Central (CST))
  - Summer (DST): UTC-5 (CDT)
- Postal code: 50268
- Area code: 641
- GNIS feature ID: 464588

Indianapolis is an unincorporated community in Mahaska County, Iowa, United States. Indianapolis is located in the northwestern portion of Monroe Township.

Founded in 1845, Indianapolis reached its peak in the 1880s. After talks of a railroad linkage from Clinton and Oskaloosa fell through, the population began to decline.

Indianapolis contained a post office from 1850 until 1902. Indianapolis was named by settlers from Indianapolis, Indiana in the late 1840s.
