= Oskaloosa Community School District =

Public school district in Oskaloosa, Iowa, United States

Coordinates: 41.309327°N 92.640988°W

Location
- Oskaloosa, Iowa Mahasaka County United States
- Coordinates: 41.309327, -92.640988

District information
- Type: Local school district
- Motto: Believe, Achieve, and Create with Pride
- Grades: K-12
- Superintendent: Mike Fisher
- Schools: 4
- Budget: $34,142,000 (2020-21)
- NCES District ID: 1921870

Students and staff
- Students: 2115 (2022-23)
- Teachers: 159.87 FTE
- Staff: 146.53 FTE
- Student–teacher ratio: 13.23
- Athletic conference: Little Hawkeye
- District mascot: Indians
- Colors: Maroon and White

Other information
- Website: www.oskycsd.org

Oskaloosa Community School District is a public school district headquartered in Oskaloosa, Iowa. The district is completely within Mahasaka County, and serves the city of Oskaloosa and surrounding areas including the towns of Beacon, Keomah Village, and University Park.

Mike Fisher was hired as district superintendent in 2022.

== Schools ==
The district operate three schools, and an administration building, all in Oskaloosa:

- Oskaloosa Elementary School
- Oskaloosa Middle School
- Oskaloosa High School

== See also ==
- List of school districts in Iowa
