= Ken Rozenboom =

American politician

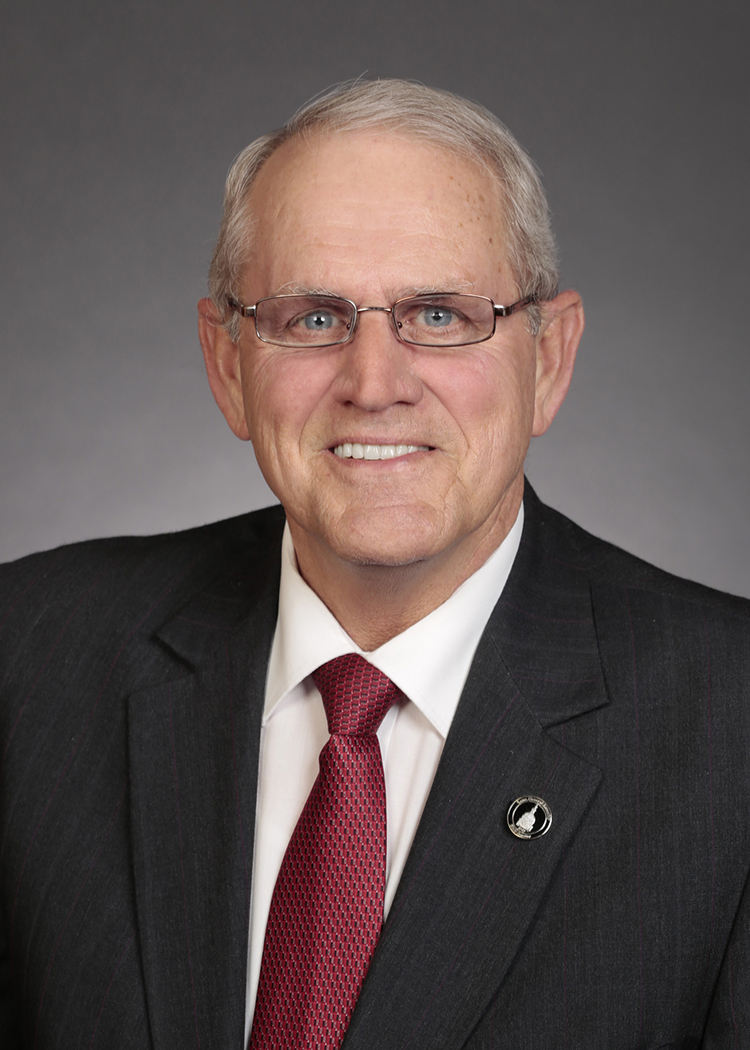
- Official portrait, 2017

President pro tempore of the Iowa Senate
- Incumbent
- Assumed office January 13, 2025
- Preceded by: Brad Zaun

Member of the Iowa Senate
- Incumbent
- Assumed office January 14, 2013
- Preceded by: James F. Hahn
- Constituency: 40th district (2013–2023); 19th district (2023–present)

Personal details
- Born: September 5, 1951 (age 74) Oskaloosa, Iowa, U.S.
- Party: Republican
- Spouse: Becky Goemaat
- Children: 2
- Education: Calvin University (attended)

Kenneth John Rozenboom (born September 5, 1951) is the Iowa State Senator from the 19th District. A Republican, he has served in the Iowa Senate since being elected in 2013.

== Biography ==
Born in Oskaloosa to Jacob Gerald Rozenboom (1922-2019) and Clarissa Henrietta (Stek) Rozenboom (1921-2022). He has 5 siblings: Allan, Calvin, Norman, Kathleen and David. His brother, Calvin, died in 2024.

His parental grandparents were Geurt and Maatje (Van Snippenberg) Rozenboom, who came to the US in 1910 from the Netherlands. They changed their names to George and Martha.

His dad served in World War II in France, Germany and Belgium. His mother was a schoolteacher. His father died at age 97. His mother died two months shy of her 101st birthday in 2022.

In 1962, his brother Allan died at age 15, suffering from Hodgkin's Disease. His mother's brother, Gordon, had Cerebral palsy.

He was raised in Oskaloosa. Rozenboom graduated Pella Christian High School before attending Calvin College in Michigan. After college, he returned home to work on the family farm along with also working as a sales production manager. He stepped into politics when he became Mahaska County Supervisor in 2010, going on to serve two years until 2012. He currently resides in Oskaloosa with his wife Becky. They have two children and four grandchildren.

== Iowa Senate ==
=== Committee Assignments ===
Rozenboom served on the Natural Resources and Environment and the Rules and Administration Committees. In 2014, in addition to his first two committees, he joined the Appropriations Committee, Veterans Affairs Committee and Agriculture and Natural Resources Appropriations Subcommittee.

Rozenboom served on the Agriculture Committee, Natural Resources and Environment Committee, Appropriations Committee, Veterans Affairs Committee and Agriculture and Natural Resources Appropriations Subcommittee from 2013 to 2017. From 2015 to 2017, he was Ranking Member of the Natural Resources and Environment Committee and Agriculture and Natural Resources Appropriations Subcommittee. In 2019, he left the Veterans Affairs Committee and went to the Education Committee, in addition to the rest of his committees. He was also the Vice Chair on the Agriculture and Natural Resources Appropriations Subcommittee and Chair of the Natural Resources and Environment Committee from 2019 to 2022. In 2021, he was the Chair on the Agriculture and Natural Resources Appropriations Subcommittee.

In the 2020 session, Rozenboom served on the Natural Resources and Environment, Agriculture, Appropriations, Education, and State Government, Agriculture Committees and Natural Resources Appropriations Subcommittee and Flood Mitigation Board.

In the 2023-2024 session, Rozenboom was the Chair of the Education Committee, Vice Chair of the Agriculture Committee and member of the Natural Resources and Environment and Transportation Committees.

In the 2025 session, Rozenboom served as a member on the Natural Resources and Environment committee, Rules and Administration committee, Transportation committee; as Vice Chair on the Agriculture committee and on the Ethics committee and as Chair of the State Government committee.

=== Hoover Award ===
In March 2019, Rozenboom was awarded the Herbert Hoover Award for his years of service to the community.

=== Spinachgate ===
In 2026 he became associated with the informal term “Spinachgate”, a nickname applied by critics after comments he made during a legislative debate on drinking‑water nitrate contamination. During an April 1, 2026 floor speech, Rozenboom argued that concerns about nitrate‑related cancer risks were overstated and suggested that people worried about nitrate exposure should “look at how much nitrate is in spinach instead.” The remarks drew criticism from environmental groups and public‑health advocates, who cited research linking elevated nitrate levels in drinking water to increased cancer risk. "Rozenboom remarks on nitrates spark backlash from environmental groups". Des Moines Register. April 2, 2026."'Spinachgate': Iowa senator's comments ignite water‑quality debate". Cedar Rapids Gazette. April 3, 2026.F

Iowa’s water‑quality debate has drawn heightened attention in part because the state has reported the highest cancer incidence rate in the United States, according to the Iowa Cancer Registry’s 2023 and 2024 annual reports."Iowa again has the nation's highest cancer rate, new report shows". Des Moines Register. March 2, 2024. Researchers at the University of Iowa have identified multiple contributing factors, including elevated nitrate levels in drinking water, widespread agricultural chemical exposure, and limited regulation of nutrient runoff."Iowa's cancer rate leads the nation; experts cite nitrates, pesticides, and rural risk factors". Cedar Rapids Gazette. March 3, 2024. Public‑health officials have noted that Iowa’s cancer incidence has remained above the national average for decades, with the state’s rate approximately 20% higher than the U.S. average in recent reporting years."University of Iowa report links environmental exposure to state's high cancer rate". Iowa Public Radio. March 1, 2023.

=== Retirement ===
In December 2021, due to redistricting, Rozenboom announced that he would not seek re-election to the Iowa Senate following changes caused by redistricting which affected his current representation. In February 2022, he reversed his decision and ran in the 2022 Senate election for the 19th district. He subsequently won by over 30%.

=== President Pro Tempore ===
On January 13, 2025, Senator Tim Kraayenbrink nominated Rozenboom to be the President pro tempore of the Senate, which he was elected unanimously.

== Electoral history ==
2012 Iowa 40th District Senate Election Results
Party	Candidate	Votes	%	±%
Republican	Ken Rozenboom	17,628	57.25%	
Democratic	Tim Tripp	11,670	37.90%	
	Write-ins, Under and over votes	1,495	4.85%	
Turnout		30,793	100.00%	

2016 Iowa 40th District Senate Election Results
Party	Candidate	Votes	%	±%
Republican	Ken Rozenboom	23,768	77.2%	
Democratic	No candidate		0%	
	Write-ins, Under and over votes	7,016	22.79%	
Turnout		30,784	100.00%	

2020 Iowa 40th District Senate Election Results
Party	Candidate	Votes	%	±%
Republican	Ken Rozenboom	22,022	67.69%	
Democratic	Lance Roorda	8,760	26.91%	
	Write-ins, Under and over votes	1,760	5.4%	
Turnout		32,542	100.00%	

2022 Iowa 19th District Senate Election Results
Party	Candidate	Votes	%	±%
Republican	Ken Rozenboom	18,118	67.12%	
Democratic	Tyler Stewart	8,283	30.69%	
	Write-ins, Under and over votes	589	2.1%	
Turnout		26,990	100.00%	

Iowa Senate
Preceded by Brad Zaun	President pro tempore of the Iowa Senate; 2025–present	Incumbent
