= Madison Township, Mahaska County, Iowa =

Township in Mahaska County, Iowa, United States

Coordinates: 41°23′N 92°42′W

Madison Township is a township in Mahaska County, Iowa, United States.
