= Lincoln Township, Mahaska County, Iowa =

Township in Iowa, USA

Coordinates: 41°19′N 92°40′W

Lincoln Township is a township in Mahaska County, Iowa, United States.
