= Harrison Township, Mahaska County, Iowa =

Township in Iowa, USA

Coordinates: 41°12′N 92°35′W

Harrison Township is a township in Mahaska County, Iowa, United States.
