= Centre In The Square =

Canadian performing arts centre

Coordinates: 43°27′15.57″N 80°29′2.71″W

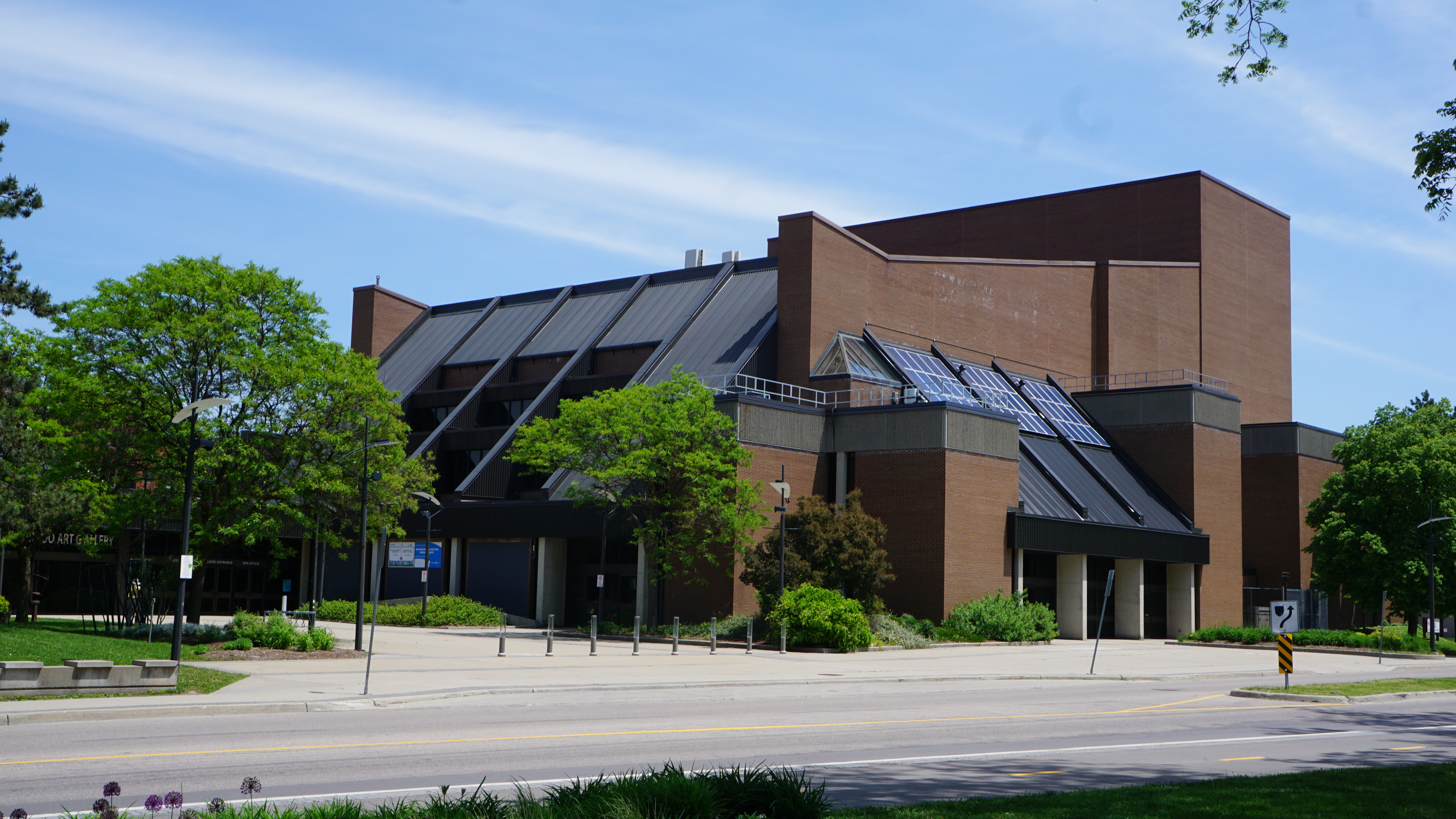
- Exterior of Centre In The Square
- Interactive map of Centre In The Square
- Location: 101 Queen Street North; Kitchener, Ontario; N2H 6P7
- Owner: City of Kitchener
- Capacity: 2,047

Construction
- Opened: 1980
- Years active: 1980–present

Website
- Venue Website

Centre In The Square is a live theatre and performing arts centre located on Queen Street in downtown Kitchener, Ontario, Canada.

The centre is home to the Raffi Armenian Theatre. This 2,047 seat hall is the largest in Waterloo Region as well as the main venue for Kitchener-Waterloo Symphony performances. The Studio Theatre is the second performing space inside the building. It is a multipurpose space used for receptions, rehearsals, and intimate cabaret-style performances. Nearly 200,000 patrons visit The Centre annually.

The Kitchener-Waterloo Art Gallery also resides within Centre In The Square and maintains separate administrative offices.

== History ==
The Centre opened in September, 1980 and cost just over $11 million. The building was designed by Kitchener architecture firm Rieder, Hymmen and Lobban and earned international attention for its expansive view and acoustical superiority.

The site was once home to the Emmanuel Bible College. Incorrect information as the EBC site states it was located until 1964 in a house on Ahrens Street, which is one block south of Otto Street. Centre In The Square is located between Ellen Street East and Otto Street, at 101 Queen Street North.

The Centre In The Square building is owned by the City of Kitchener and operated by a not-for-profit corporation. The centre is currently governed by a 14-member board which includes the Mayor of Kitchener, three city councilors, and eight citizens appointed by city council.

== Programming ==
Regular season programming runs from September to June featuring numerous series. In accordance with the mission statement adopted in 2005, The centre offers a wide range of shows in hopes to provide entertainment for all members of the local community. Series include:

- Broadway
- Comedy
- Songwriters
- Electric Thursdays
- Classic Albums Live
- Canadian Play
- K-W Symphony Signature
- K-W Symphony Pops

=== Magnetic North Theatre Festival ===
The annual Magnetic North Theatre Festival was held June 9–19, 2010 in Kitchener-Waterloo. The centre was the main venue for festival performances, hosting Rick Mercer, Norman, and The Greatest Cities in the World.

As part of the festival, Governor General Michaëlle Jean visited Centre In The Square on Monday, June 14, 2010, to host Art Matters, a public forum on the importance of the arts in creating better communities.

== Studio Theatre ==
The smaller performing space in The centre has traditionally been used for K-W Symphony rehearsals and private functions. However, this is set to change by March 2011 as Centre In The Square has received $1.2 million in federal government stimulus funding. The Studio Theatre will be retrofitted into a versatile space for up to 350 patrons.
