= Lake Keomah State Park =

State park in Mahaska County, Iowa

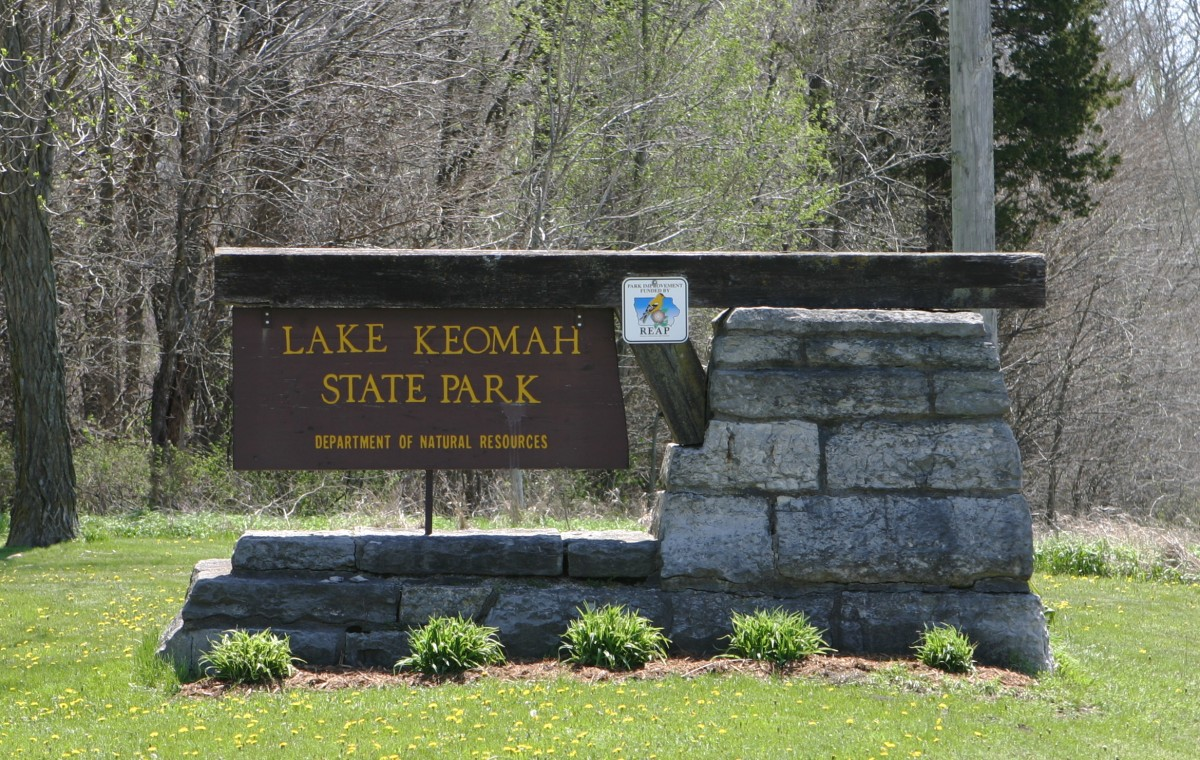

- Location within Iowa Location within the United States
- Location: Mahaska County, Iowa, United States
- Coordinates: 41°17′39″N 92°32′31″W
- Area: 366 acres (148 ha)
- Elevation: 745 ft (227 m)
- Established: 1934
- Administrator: Iowa Department of Natural Resources
- Website: Official website

Lake Keomah State Park is a state park in Mahaska County, Iowa, United States. To the park's immediate east is Keomah Village and the park is approximately 4 miles (6.4 km) east of Oskaloosa. Lake Keomah State Park is a 366-acre (148 ha) state park that surrounds and includes Lake Keomah. Lake Keomah is an 83-acre (34 ha) reservoir.

== History ==
Lake Keomah State Park was financed by Keokuk and Mahaska counties. "Keomah" is a portmanteau derived from the names of the two counties "Keokuk" and "Mahaska".

Civilian Conservation Corps (CCC) Company 776 arrived in Oskaloosa on June 3, 1933 and began work on Lake Keomah. It is the first man-made lake in the State of Iowa. After the dam and spillway were completed in October 1934, they turned their attention to soil erosion control and then constructing the various facilities. Although incomplete, the park was dedicated in 1934. At the time it was a 254-acre (103 ha) park that grew to its current size in 1942. By May 1935 work had begun on the beach, and the first meals were served in the lodge on June 26, 1936. The CCC ended its work in the park in 1937. The original spillway was replaced in 1965.

== Historic districts ==
In 1990 two areas of the park were set aside as nationally recognized historic districts listed on the National Register of Historic Places. They are both part of a larger study of Iowa's state parks called the "Civilian Conservation Corps Properties in Iowa State Parks: 1933-1942".

=== Lake Keomah State Park, Bathhouse-Lodge Area (Area A) ===
Area A contains four historic resources that includes the lodge, bathhouse, two latrines, and the road. The buildings were designed in the rustic style by the Central Design Office in Ames. They are all single story, stone structures with timber roof framing. The latrines were converted into storage facilities. A boathouse that protrudes from the base of the bathhouse was converted into a concession stand. And the bathhouse itself has been altered for a different purpose.

=== Lake Keomah State Park, Erosion Control Area (Area B) ===
Area B contains two check dams as its historical resources. They were built to control the flow of soil along a watershed. Each dam has an indentation in the center of its head that allows water to flow down the dam while slowing the movement of silt. They are located south of the main park road in a section of timber. The two dams are located 100 feet (30 m) apart, and are about 3 feet (0.91 m) in width and 31 feet (9.4 m) in length at the top. They are composed of twelve tiers of rubble limestone.

== Land usage ==
Lake Keomah State Park has several facilities open for public usage. Picnic shelters and a lodge may be reserved for use. There are also two boat ramps, numerous campsites, trails, modern showers, restrooms, and an unsupervised beach.

== See also ==
- List of geographic portmanteaus
