= Peoria, Iowa =

- Unincorporated community
- Location within Iowa Location within the United States
- Coordinates: 41°27′43″N 92°48′05″W
- Country: United States
- State: Iowa
- County: Mahaska
- Elevation: 787 ft (240 m)
- Time zone: UTC-6 (Central (CST))
  - Summer (DST): UTC-5 (CDT)
- Area code: 641
- GNIS feature ID: 460077

Peoria (/ˈpɪrˌiː/) is an unincorporated community in Richland Township, Mahaska County, Iowa, United States.

== Geography ==
Peoria is located along County Highway T33 7.2 miles (11.6 km) northeast of Pella.

== History ==
The population was 65 in 1940.

Peoria was along the route of the Century Loop on the 2018 RAGBRAI.
