= Tioga, Iowa =

- Unincorporated community
- Location within Iowa Location within the United States
- Coordinates: 41°17′49″N 92°25′21″W
- Country: United States
- State: Iowa
- County: Mahaska
- Elevation: 797 ft (243 m)
- Time zone: UTC-6 (Central (CST))
  - Summer (DST): UTC-5 (CDT)
- Area code: 641
- GNIS feature ID: 464270

Tioga is an unincorporated community in Mahaska County, in the U.S. state of Iowa.

== History ==
Tioga was platted in 1886. It was named after Tioga, Tioga County, Pennsylvania. A post office opened in Tioga in 1886 and closed in 1920.

Tioga's population was 30 in 1902, and 45 in 1925. The population was 12 in 1940.
