= Harold Sherk =

Canadian priest and educator (1903–1974)

- Born: December 20, 1903; Berlin, Ontario, Canada
- Died: February 28, 1974 (aged 70); Kitchener, Ontario, Canada
- Education: Chicago Evangelistic Institute, 1922-25
- Occupation(s): Teacher, Emmanuel Bible College, 1940-44, 1946-49; executive secretary, Mennonite Central Committee, Peace Section, 1949-58; executive secretary, National Service Board for Religious Objectors, 1958-69; Mennonite minister

John Harold Sherk (20 December 1903 – 28 February 1974) was a Canadian Mennonite minister, educator, and advocate of Christian pacifism.

== Early life and background ==
Sherk was born in Berlin, Ontario (later renamed to Kitchener in 1916). His father, John Hubert Sherk, was a local farmer and deacon near Centreville, which at the time was in Waterloo Township and had not been annexed by the city of Kitchener. Harold's grandfather, Moses Sherk, was a Mennonite minister. His great-grandfather, Abraham Sherk (1817–1898), was the first in his line to be born in Waterloo Township; he grew up near Blair, of which his own grandfather, Joseph Schörg (1769–1855), had been one of the first settlers, and also one of the first settlers of Waterloo Township in general. He was part of the first wave of Pennsylvania Dutch settlers who purchased plots in the German Company Tract. The family had previously lived in Switzerland before emigrating to Lancaster County, Pennsylvania in 1727.

== Peace activism ==
As the first secretary of the Conference of Historic Peace Churches (formed in 1940 in Ontario), Sherk negotiated frequently with the Canadian federal government. In India from 1944 to 1946, under the auspices of the Mennonite Central Committee he implemented what grew to be, by the 1980s, a million-dollar relief program. Soon afterwards in Akron, Pennsylvania he became the first full-time employee of the Peace Section of Mennonite Central Committee, and "his efforts to protect the rights of conscientious objectors was evident in the 1951 U.S. military draft law" known as the Universal Military Training and Service Act.

From the late 1950s to 1969, in Washington, D.C. Sherk was the executive secretary of the National Service Board for Religious Objectors, representing the peace interests of the Mennonites to the American federal government. His legacy may be summarized as, "From World War II through the Korean and Vietnam wars, J. Harold Sherk was a leader in promoting Christian pacifism."
