= White Oak Township, Mahaska County, Iowa =

Township in Mahaska County, Iowa, U.S.

Coordinates: 41°18′N 92°28′W

White Oak Township is a township in Mahaska County, Iowa, United States.
