= Emmanuel Bible College =

Christian college in Ontario, Canada

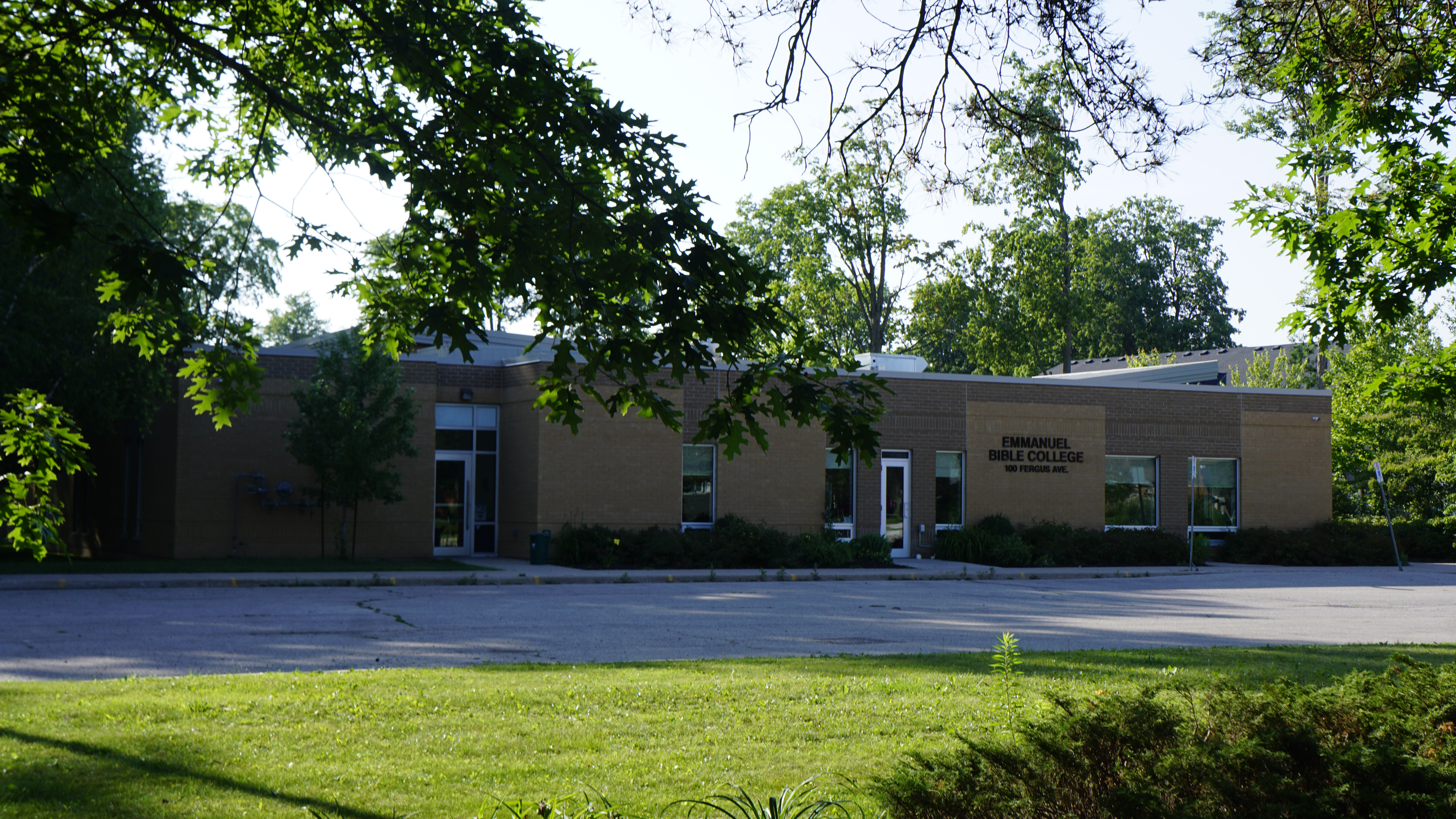
- The J.H. Sherk Education Centre
- Established: 1940
- Location: Kitchener, Ontario, Canada

Emmanuel Bible College is an interdenominational Evangelical Christian Bible college located in Kitchener, Ontario, Canada.

== History ==
In response to a need for trained Christian leaders, the college was established in 1940 as a Bible school in Stouffville, Ontario by Ward M Shantz. It then shortly relocated to Gormley, Ontario. In 1943 the school was moved to downtown Kitchener, Ontario (now site of Centre In The Square on Ahrens near Queen Street) and then, in 1964, to the current location at 100 Fergus Avenue in Kitchener.

In 1982 the college received its accreditation by the Association for Biblical Higher Education, following the passing of a provincial Act giving it the right to grant degrees. This accreditation expired in Feb 2023, and has not been renewed.

== Mission ==
Emmanuel exists to provide training in Christian discipleship and ministry to persons of all ages through both degree programs and nonformal training that includes online courses and certificates and regularly offered workshops under the name "Refresh". The college's mission statement is: "Through academic training and hands on ministry and service, Emmanuel prepares Christ followers who are committed to making a difference in their world."

== Campus ==
The campus is currently undergoing changes, and consists of three main buildings.

- J.H. Sherk Education Centre - named for Rev. J. Harold Sherk, a member of the college's original faculty
- Edna Pridham Memorial Library - named for the college's first missionary, who died while serving in Nigeria
- Warder Hall - named for Mrs. Maude Warder, a member of the college's original staff

Originally held in the basements of the Stouffville and Gormley Mennonite Brethren in Christ Churches, Emmanuel purchased a house on Ahrens St. in Kitchener, Ontario in 1943. The college met on Ahrens St. until 1964, when it moved to its location on Fergus Ave. with a newly constructed administration building. The Faith Missionary Church building was also sold to Emmanuel around this time.

Before changes to the campus began in 2018, the college also owned and used several other buildings on its Fergus Ave. property.

- Ward M. Shantz Chapel - named for the founding President of the college
- Ellis A. Lageer Administration Building - named for the college's fourth President
- Emmanuel Campus Centre - originally named Edgewood Hall
- Lehman Hall - named for an original member of the college's faculty
- Wideman Hall - named for the college's second President
