= Prairie Township, Mahaska County, Iowa =

Township in Mahaska County, Iowa, U.S.

Coordinates: 41°28′N 92°42′W

Prairie Township is a township in Mahaska County, Iowa, United States.
