= Wright, Iowa =

- Unincorporated community
- Location within Iowa Location within the United States
- Coordinates: 41°14′57″N 92°31′34″W
- Country: United States
- State: Iowa
- County: Mahaska
- Elevation: 843 ft (257 m)
- Time zone: UTC-6 (Central (CST))
  - Summer (DST): UTC-5 (CDT)
- Area code: 641
- GNIS feature ID: 463215

Wright is an unincorporated community in Mahaska County, in the U.S. state of Iowa.

== History ==
A post office was established at Wright in 1883, and remained in operation until it was discontinued in 1973. The community was named for a local landowner.

Wright's population was 21 in 1902, and had increased to 115 by 1925. The population was 125 in 1940.
