= Leighton, Iowa =

- City
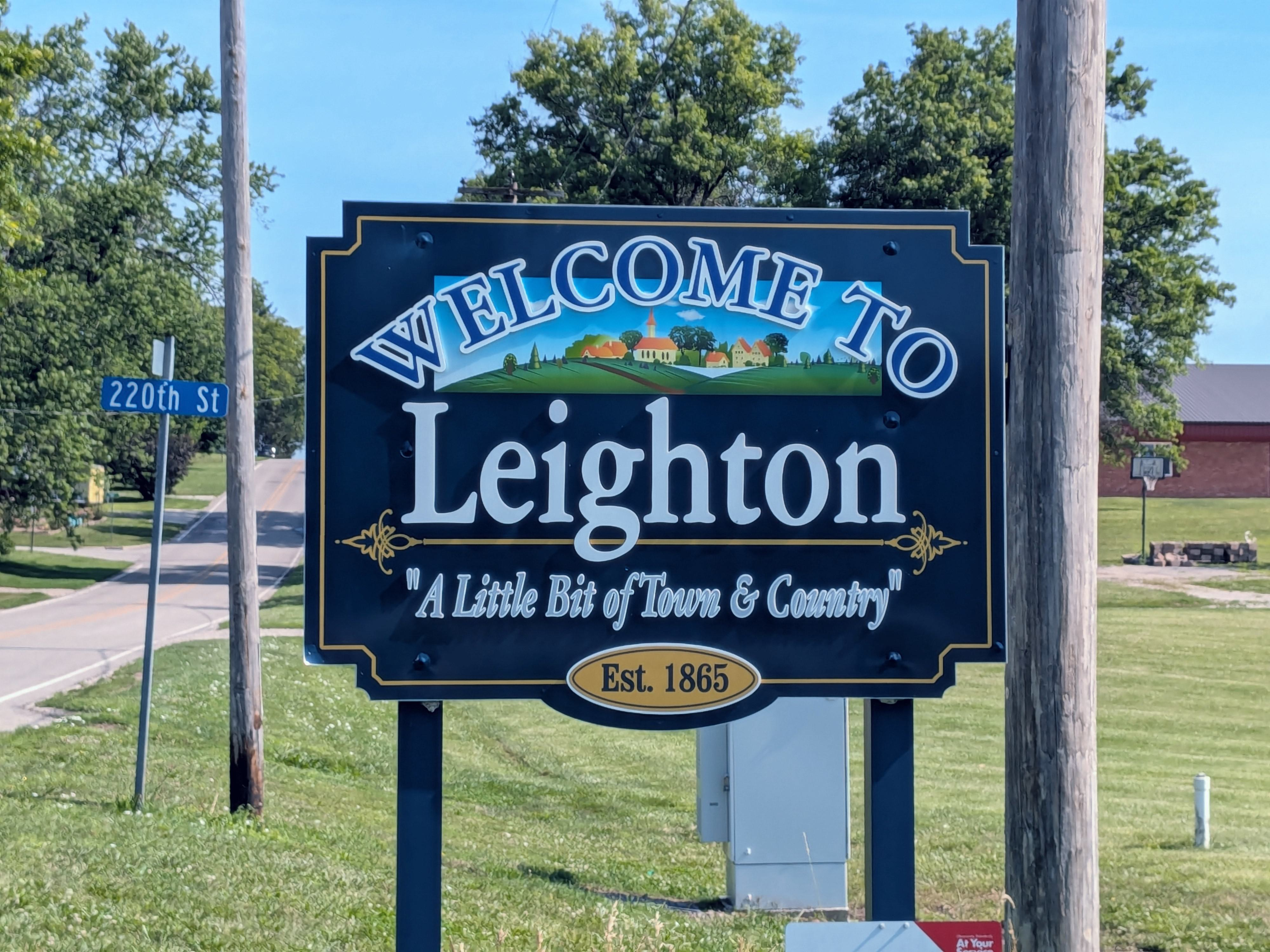
- Welcome Sign in Leighton

- Location of Leighton, Iowa
- Coordinates: 41°20′20″N 92°47′11″W
- Country: United States
- State: Iowa
- County: Mahaska
- Incorporated: September 21, 1909

Area
  - Total: 0.093 sq mi (0.24 km^{2})
  - Land: 0.093 sq mi (0.24 km^{2})
  - Water: 0 sq mi (0.00 km^{2})
- Elevation: 804 ft (245 m)

Population (2020)
  - Total: 158
  - Density: 1,705.8/sq mi (658.63/km^{2})
- Time zone: UTC-6 (Central (CST))
  - Summer (DST): UTC-5 (CDT)
- ZIP code: 50143
- Area code: 641
- FIPS code: 19-44310
- GNIS feature ID: 2395673

Leighton is a city in Mahaska County, Iowa, United States. The population was 158 in the 2020 United States census, an increase from 153 in the 2000 United States census.

== Geography ==
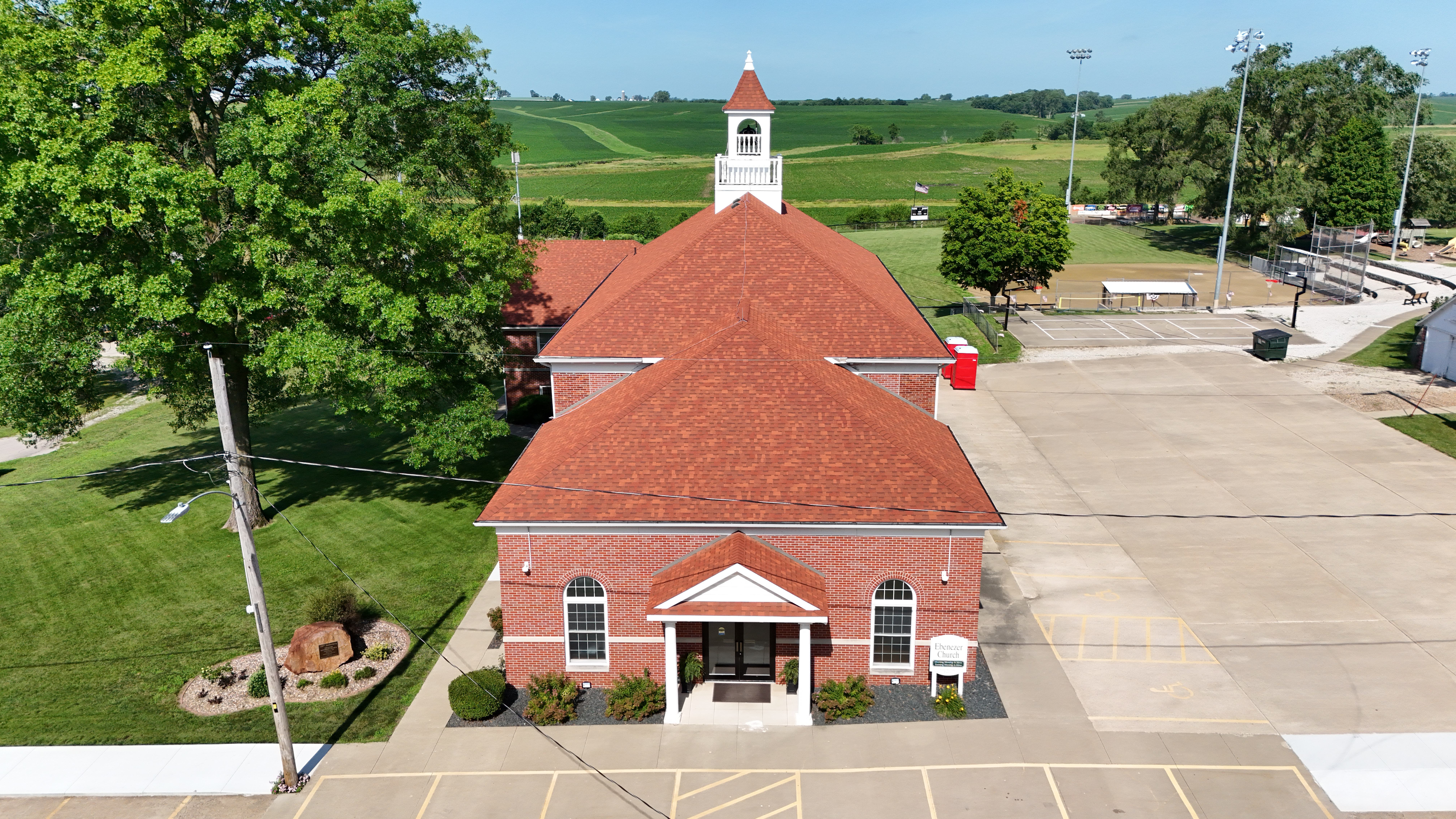
Ebenezer Church in Leighton

According to the United States Census Bureau, the city has a total area of 0.10 square miles (0.26 km^{2}), all of it land.

== Demographics ==
Historical population
| Census | Pop. | Note | %± |
|---|---|---|---|
| 1880 | 145 | | — |
| 1920 | 130 | | — |
| 1930 | 115 | | −11.5% |
| 1940 | 128 | | 11.3% |
| 1950 | 118 | | −7.8% |
| 1960 | 167 | | 41.5% |
| 1970 | 140 | | −16.2% |
| 1980 | 137 | | −2.1% |
| 1990 | 142 | | 3.6% |
| 2000 | 153 | | 7.7% |
| 2010 | 162 | | 5.9% |
| 2020 | 158 | | −2.5% |
U.S. Decennial Census

=== 2020 census ===
As of the 2020 United States census, there were 158 people, 66 households, and 47 families residing in the city. The population density was 1,705.8 inhabitants per square mile (658.6/km^{2}). There were 67 housing units at an average density of 723.4 per square mile (279.3/km^{2}). The racial makeup of the city was 97.5% White, 0.0% Black or African American, 0.0% Native American, 0.6% Asian, 0.0% Pacific Islander, 0.6% from other races and 1.3% from two or more races. Hispanic or Latino persons of any race comprised 3.2% of the population.

Of the 66 households, 24.2% of which had children under the age of 18 living with them, 59.1% were married couples living together, 6.1% were cohabitating couples, 18.2% had a female householder with no spouse or partner present and 16.7% had a male householder with no spouse or partner present. 28.8% of all households were non-families. 22.7% of all households were made up of individuals, 12.1% had someone living alone who was 65 years old or older.

The median age in the city was 46.5 years. 24.7% of the residents were under the age of 20; 3.2% were between the ages of 20 and 24; 20.9% were from 25 and 44; 24.7% were from 45 and 64; and 26.6% were 65 years of age or older. The gender makeup of the city was 53.8% male and 46.2% female.

=== 2010 census ===
At the 2010 United States census there were 162 people, 65 households, and 48 families living in the city. The population density was 1,620.0 inhabitants per square mile (625.5/km^{2}). There were 65 housing units at an average density of 650.0 per square mile (251.0/km^{2}). The racial makeup of the city was 99.4% White and 0.6% from two or more races. Of the 65 households, 29.2% had children under the age of 18 living with them, 72.3% were married couples living together, 1.5% had a male householder with no wife present, and 26.2% were non-families. 24.6% of households were one person, and 12.3% were one person aged 65 or older. The average household size was 2.49 and the average family size was 2.98.

The median age was 42 years. 25.9% of residents were under the age of 18; 5.6% were between the ages of 18 and 24; 27.2% were from 25 to 44; 18.5% were from 45 to 64; and 22.8% were 65 or older. The gender makeup of the city was 53.7% male and 46.3% female.

=== 2000 census ===
At the 2000 United States census there were 153 people, 56 households, and 43 families living in the city. The population density was 2,004.7 inhabitants per square mile (774.0/km^{2}). There were 59 housing units at an average density of 773.0 per square mile (298.5/km^{2}). The racial makeup of the city was 100.00% White, 0.00% African American, 0.00% Native American, 0.00% Asian, 0.00% Pacific Islander, 0.00% from other races, and 0.00% from two or more races. 0.00% of the population were Hispanic or Latino of any race. There were 56 households; 33.9% had children under the age of 18 living with them, 75.0% were married couples living together, 0.0% had a female householder with no husband present, and 23.2% were non-families. 23.2% of all households were made up of individuals, and 16.1% had someone living alone who was 65 or older. The average household size was 2.73 and the average family size was 3.21.

The age distribution was 31.4% under the age of 18, 5.9% from 18 to 24, 25.5% from 25 to 44, 20.3% from 45 to 64, and 17.0% who were 65 or older. The median age was 35 years. For every 100 females, there were 112.5 males. For every 100 females age 18 and over, there were 105.9 males.

The median household income was $46,667 and the median family income was $46,667. Males had a median income of $33,750 versus $25,833 for females. The per capita income for the city was $16,294. 0.0% of the population and 0.0% of families were below the poverty line.

== Notable people ==
- Jim Van Engelenhoven, Iowa State Representative
