= Pleasant Grove Township, Mahaska County, Iowa =

Township in Mahaska County, Iowa, United States

Coordinates: 41°28′N 92°28′W

Pleasant Grove Township is a township in Mahaska County, Iowa, United States.
