= Jefferson Township, Mahaska County, Iowa =

Township in Iowa, USA

Coordinates: 41°13′N 92°49′W

Jefferson Township is a township in Mahaska County, Iowa, United States.
