= Garfield Township, Mahaska County, Iowa =

Township in Iowa, United States

Coordinates: 41°18′N 92°42′W

Garfield Township is a township in Mahaska County, Iowa, United States.
