= Scott Township, Mahaska County, Iowa =

Township in Mahaska County, Iowa, U.S.

Coordinates: 41°19′N 92°49′W

Scott Township is a township in Mahaska County, Iowa, United States.
