= Richland Township, Mahaska County, Iowa =

Township in Mahaska County, Iowa, U.S.

Coordinates: 41°28′N 92°49′W

Richland Township is a township located in the northwest corner of Mahaska County, Iowa, United States bordering Jasper County to its north and Marion County to its west. Peoria, founded 1853, is the last remaining village (unincorporated) in the township, but the communities of Warrensville, Lower Grove, and Granville once existed as unincorporated populated places in Richland township.

== Historical Populated Places in Richland Township ==
=== Peoria / Warrensville ===
The first European settler in Richland Township is believed to be George Buckley, who in 1843, built a house near a creek that now bears his name. A road called Peoria Main Street later ran past this house from the main branch to the middle branch of the Buckley. At or near the high point on this road were built, at various times, facilities which served the community that became Peoria. These included a cemetery (which still functions as the township cemetery), the township hall, a public school, and two churches. The town was first platted to the east of this hill along Main Street, with several plats added to the west and south before 1871. [Comprehensive records of ownership of land and businesses for all of Mahaska County were compiled in 1871.] The Peoria business directory then listed 14 businesses. These included: two (perhaps three) general stores, a hotel, a wagon shop, a steam powered sawmill, an attorney, a doctor, and a bee keeper, in addition to several livestock dealers. After 1871, increasing numbers of Dutch immigrants began to populate the area, and by 1920, businesses were mostly "Dutch owned".

An area called Warrensville, founded in 1849, was the forerunner to Peoria, lying about 2 miles southwest of Peoria on the west bank of the Skunk River. Its main business was the Warren water powered grist mill located on the riverbank. It was destroyed by fire in 1850 and rebuilt. The mill again burned 1883, but was not rebuilt. A sawmill at the location was in sporadic operation into the 1950s.

In 1871, there was a passage of some sort across the Skunk River at Warrensville. In 1886, Warrensville became the site of Warren Bridge, making trafficking between Peoria and Pella easier. (This was especially important to those Peoria residents who shared Dutch roots with Pella residents.) The bridge was replaced in the 1950s, and relocated a few hundred yards upstream. It is now crossed by Iowa Highway 102, and Mahaska County Road T-33. A new high road was constructed diagonally across the marshy bottom-land on the left (northwest) side of the river, connecting the bridge to the south-most end of Peoria Cross Street.

A Mahaska County "one room school", called Warren School, was located just upstream from the river bridge, and was in existence until the area became part of the Pella Community School District in 1956. In Peoria, there were a growing number of students from families of Dutch descent in the public school, and in 1904, the Holland Christian Reformed Church of Peoria, Iowa began a two-month summer school for the purposes of religious instruction and maintaining literacy in the Holland language in the community. The success of this effort emboldened the church members to begin, in 1907, a Christian Day School with instruction in the Holland language. This caused a rift in the community, and combined with concerns that the Dutch were not patriotic Americans, led to the church and school being burned in 1918. After a two-year hiatus, the school resumed and, with ever fewer non-Dutch residents, the public school withered away.

The post office serving the area was located in Warrensville from August, 1849 to November, 1854. The post office was then moved to Peoria, where it was in operation until January, 1906. In 1902, the first "Rural Route" was established in Pella, Iowa (located about 9 miles southwest of Peoria). After 1906, mail service for the Peoria area was from Pella, designated "RR #2" for most of the 20th century.

=== Granville / Grandville ===
Granville was located at what is now the intersection of Fisher Ave and 110th St, about five miles northeast of Peoria. The village was platted as "Grandville" by Theodore Spain on June 18, 1851. The most constant entity during its existence was the Granville School, in operation from 1846 to 1958. The death knell for the village came in 1881 in the form of a railroad built through Taintor, Iowa, a town one and a half miles to the northeast in neighboring Prairie Township. By January 1883, the post office closed. In 1912, there was still a two-story school house, church and store. The last structure to exist in the Granville community was a "one room country" school. The area is now part of the North Mahaska School District. A business currently located in the Granville area is Wehrle Trucking Inc.

=== Lower Grove / Bernia ===
The Lower Grove community still exists in the form of Lower Grove Church established in 1905; Lower Grove Park & Sorghum Mill; and RP America, a supplier of 3D printing equipment.
