= Iva Durham Vennard =

- Born: 1871
- Died: 1945 (aged 73–74)

Iva Durham Vennard (1871 - 1945) was an American educator and religious figure.

Born Iva May Durham near Normal, Illinois, Vennard was the youngest child of Jacob and Susan Durham; her father, a veteran of the American Civil War, died of tuberculosis when she was five. At twelve, she converted and joined the Methodist Church. She graduated from the Illinois State Normal School and taught for several years before attending Wellesley College for a year in 1892; further plans to attend Swarthmore College never came to fruition. Vennard was a holiness deaconess and evangelist. Having experienced both conversion and sanctification, she founded a training school for deaconesses in St. Louis. This was followed by the foundation, in 1910, of the Chicago Evangelist Institute, of which she remained principal until her death; the school continued as Vennard College until its closure in 2008. Vennard was also a member of the executive board of the Association of Women Preachers.

Her son William Vennard was a well-known singer and vocal pedagogist who helped create the discipline of science-informed vocal pedagogy.
