= University Park, Iowa =

- City
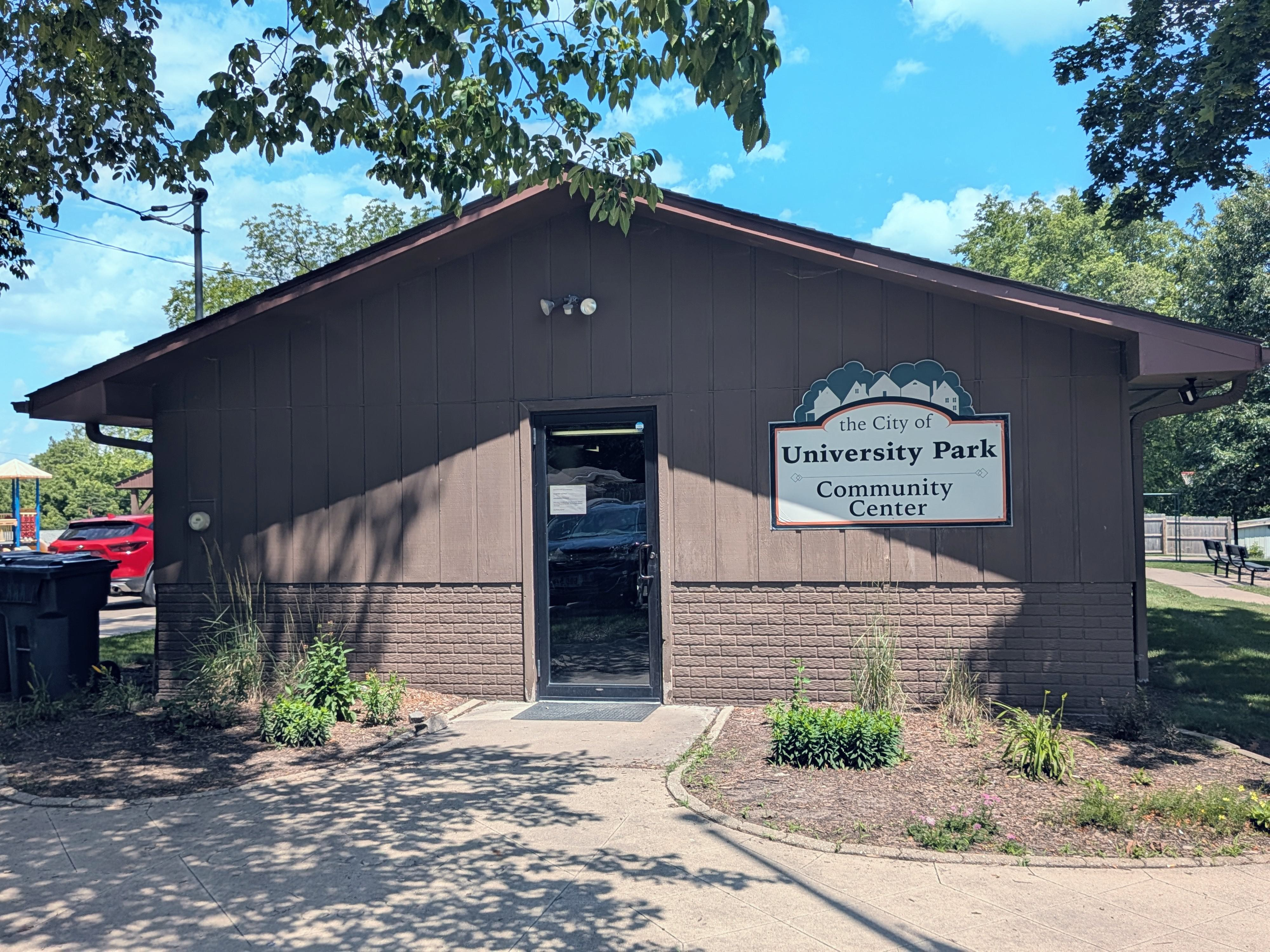
- Community Center

- Location of University Park, Iowa
- Coordinates: 41°17′08″N 92°36′54″W
- Country: United States
- State: Iowa
- County: Mahaska

Area
  - Total: 0.78 sq mi (2.02 km^{2})
  - Land: 0.78 sq mi (2.02 km^{2})
  - Water: 0 sq mi (0.00 km^{2})
- Elevation: 774 ft (236 m)

Population (2020)
  - Total: 487
  - Density: 625.9/sq mi (241.65/km^{2})
- Time zone: UTC-6 (Central (CST))
  - Summer (DST): UTC-5 (CDT)
- ZIP code: 52595
- Area code: 641
- FIPS code: 19-79815
- GNIS feature ID: 2397093

University Park is a city in Mahaska County, Iowa, United States. The population was 487 at the 2020 census.

== Geography ==
According to the United States Census Bureau, the city has a total area of 0.77 square miles (1.99 km^{2}), all of it land.

== Demographics ==
Historical populations
Year	Pop.	±%
1920	361	—
1930	443	+22.7%
1940	462	+4.3%
1950	457	−1.1%
1960	569	+24.5%
1970	534	−6.2%
1980	645	+20.8%
1990	598	−7.3%
2000	536	−10.4%
2010	487	−9.1%
2020	487	+0.0%
Source:"U.S. Census website". United States Census Bureau. and Iowa Data Center; Source: U.S. Decennial Census

=== 2020 census ===
As of the census of 2020, there were 487 people, 187 households, and 131 families residing in the city. The population density was 625.9 inhabitants per square mile (241.7/km^{2}). There were 202 housing units at an average density of 259.6 per square mile (100.2/km^{2}). The racial makeup of the city was 89.7% White, 0.6% Black or African American, 0.6% Native American, 0.4% Asian, 0.0% Pacific Islander, 0.6% from other races and 8.0% from two or more races. Hispanic or Latino persons of any race comprised 1.2% of the population.

Of the 187 households, 39.0% of which had children under the age of 18 living with them, 48.1% were married couples living together, 11.2% were cohabitating couples, 24.6% had a female householder with no spouse or partner present and 16.0% had a male householder with no spouse or partner present. 29.9% of all households were non-families. 21.9% of all households were made up of individuals, 9.6% had someone living alone who was 65 years old or older.

The median age in the city was 33.9 years. 31.4% of the residents were under the age of 20; 6.2% were between the ages of 20 and 24; 29.0% were from 25 and 44; 22.2% were from 45 and 64; and 11.3% were 65 years of age or older. The gender makeup of the city was 48.7% male and 51.3% female.

=== 2010 census ===
As of the census of 2010, there were 487 people, 191 households, and 133 families living in the city. The population density was 632.5 inhabitants per square mile (244.2/km^{2}). There were 206 housing units at an average density of 267.5 per square mile (103.3/km^{2}). The racial makeup of the city was 96.1% White, 1.8% Indian, 1.4% Asian, 0.4% from other races, and 0.2% from two or more races. Hispanic or Latino of any race were 0.8% of the population.

There were 191 households, of which 31.9% had children under the age of 18 living with them, 53.4% were married couples living together, 8.9% had a female householder with no husband present, 7.3% had a male householder with no wife present, and 30.4% were non-families. 19.9% of all households were made up of individuals, and 8.4% had someone living alone who was 65 years of age or older. The average household size was 2.55 and the average family size was 2.97.

The median age in the city was 32.9 years. 25.9% of residents were under the age of 18; 11.2% were between the ages of 18 and 24; 25.7% were from 25 to 44; 24.8% were from 45 to 64; and 12.3% were 65 years of age or older. The gender makeup of the city was 52.2% male and 47.8% female.

=== 2000 census ===
As of the census of 2000, there were 536 people, 195 households, and 139 families living in the city. The population density was 697.0 inhabitants per square mile (269.1/km^{2}). There were 204 housing units at an average density of 265.3 per square mile (102.4/km^{2}). The racial makeup of the city was 96.27% White, 0.56% African American, 0.93% Native American, 0.19% Asian, 0.75% from other races, and 1.31% from two or more races. Hispanic or Latino of any race were 1.31% of the population.

There were 195 households, out of which 33.3% had children under the age of 18 living with them, 62.1% were married couples living together, 6.2% had a female householder with no husband present, and 28.7% were non-families. 21.5% of all households were made up of individuals, and 6.7% had someone living alone who was 65 years of age or older. The average household size was 2.55 and the average family size was 2.99.

Population spread: 25.6% under the age of 18, 17.0% from 18 to 24, 28.2% from 25 to 44, 15.5% from 45 to 64, and 13.8% who were 65 years of age or older. The median age was 30 years. For every 100 females, there were 98.5 males. For every 100 females age 18 and over, there were 97.5 males.

The median income for a household in the city was $31,875, and the median income for a family was $35,682. Males had a median income of $30,000 versus $20,938 for females. The per capita income for the city was $14,212. About 7.5% of families and 7.3% of the population were below the poverty line, including 10.3% of those under age 18 and 2.1% of those age 65 or over.

== Education ==
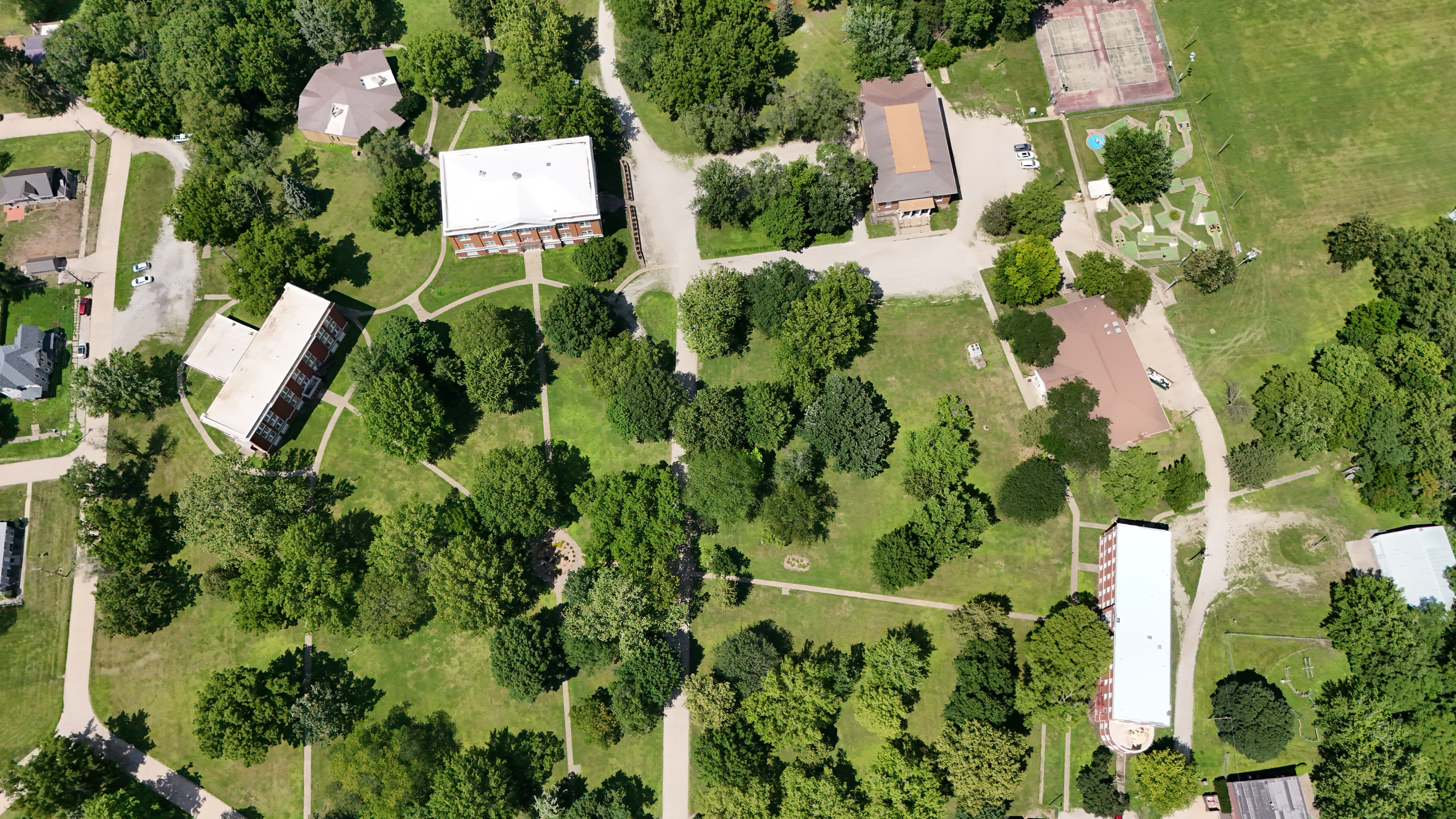
The former campus of Vennard College in University Park

The Oskaloosa Community School District operates local public schools.

University park was the location of Vennard College, until the college closed in 2008.
