= East Des Moines Township, Mahaska County, Iowa =

Township in Iowa, USA

Coordinates: 41°13′N 92°41′W

East Des Moines Township is a township in Mahaska County, Iowa, United States. It is commonly known as "East Village".
