= West Des Moines Township, Mahaska County, Iowa =

Township in Mahaska County, Iowa, U.S.

Coordinates: 41°12′N 92°43′W

West Des Moines Township is a township in Mahaska County, Iowa, United States.
