= Union Township, Mahaska County, Iowa =

Township in Mahaska County, Iowa, U.S.

Coordinates: 41°28′N 92°35′W

Union Township is a township in Mahaska County, Iowa, United States.
