= Keomah Village, Iowa =

- City
- Location of Keomah Village, Iowa
- Coordinates: 41°17′12″N 92°32′13″W
- Country: United States
- State: Iowa
- County: Mahaska

Area
  - Total: 0.039 sq mi (0.10 km^{2})
  - Land: 0.039 sq mi (0.10 km^{2})
  - Water: 0 sq mi (0.00 km^{2})
- Elevation: 807 ft (246 m)

Population (2020)
  - Total: 110
  - Density: 2,886.1/sq mi (1,114.32/km^{2})
- Time zone: UTC-6 (Central (CST))
  - Summer (DST): UTC-5 (CDT)
- ZIP code: 52577
- Area code: 641
- FIPS code: 19-40890
- GNIS feature ID: 2395516

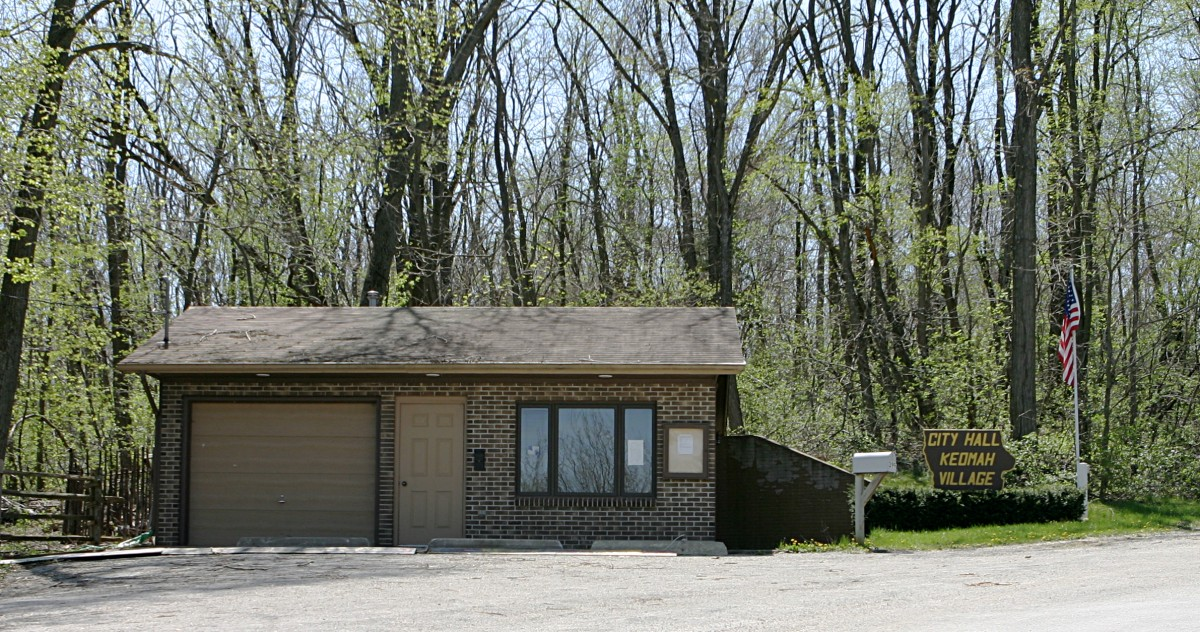
City hall

Keomah Village is a city in Mahaska County, Iowa, United States. The population was 110 at the time of the 2020 census. Keomah Village is located adjacent to Lake Keomah State Park.

== Geography ==
According to the United States Census Bureau, the city has a total area of 0.03 square miles (0.08 km^{2}), all of it land.

== Demographics ==
Historical populations
Year	Pop.	±%
1980	99	—
1990	99	+0.0%
2000	97	−2.0%
2010	84	−13.4%
2020	110	+31.0%
Source:"U.S. Census website". United States Census Bureau. and Iowa Data Center; Source: U.S. Decennial Census

=== 2020 census ===
As of the census of 2020, there were 110 people, 49 households, and 41 families residing in the city. The population density was 2,886.1 inhabitants per square mile (1,114.3/km^{2}). There were 53 housing units at an average density of 1,390.6 per square mile (536.9/km^{2}). The racial makeup of the city was 93.6% White, 0.0% Black or African American, 0.0% Native American, 0.0% Asian, 0.0% Pacific Islander, 0.0% from other races and 6.4% from two or more races. Hispanic or Latino persons of any race comprised 4.5% of the population.

Of the 49 households, 32.7% of which had children under the age of 18 living with them, 73.5% were married couples living together, 4.1% were cohabitating couples, 14.3% had a female householder with no spouse or partner present and 8.2% had a male householder with no spouse or partner present. 16.3% of all households were non-families. 10.2% of all households were made up of individuals, 0.0% had someone living alone who was 65 years old or older.

The median age in the city was 51.0 years. 12.7% of the residents were under the age of 20; 5.5% were between the ages of 20 and 24; 18.2% were from 25 and 44; 32.7% were from 45 and 64; and 30.9% were 65 years of age or older. The gender makeup of the city was 53.6% male and 46.4% female.

=== 2010 census ===
As of the census of 2010, there were 84 people, 39 households, and 32 families living in the city. The population density was 2,800.0 inhabitants per square mile (1,081.1/km^{2}). There were 48 housing units at an average density of 1,600.0 per square mile (617.8/km^{2}). The racial makeup of the city was 100.0% White. Hispanic or Latino of any race were 3.6% of the population.

There were 39 households, of which 10.3% had children under the age of 18 living with them, 76.9% were married couples living together, 5.1% had a female householder with no husband present, and 17.9% were non-families. 17.9% of all households were made up of individuals, and 2.6% had someone living alone who was 65 years of age or older. The average household size was 2.15 and the average family size was 2.41.

The median age in the city was 54.8 years. 9.5% of residents were under the age of 18; 3.7% were between the ages of 18 and 24; 15.6% were from 25 to 44; 46.4% were from 45 to 64; and 25% were 65 years of age or older. The gender makeup of the city was 51.2% male and 48.8% female.

=== 2000 census ===
As of the census of 2000, there were 97 people, 42 households, and 37 families living in the city. The population density was 3,370.2 inhabitants per square mile (1,301.2/km^{2}). There were 52 housing units at an average density of 1,806.7 per square mile (697.6/km^{2}). The racial makeup of the city was 97.94% White, 1.03% Asian, and 1.03% from two or more races.

There were 42 households, out of which 23.8% had children under the age of 18 living with them, 81.0% were married couples living together, 7.1% had a female householder with no husband present, and 11.9% were non-families. 11.9% of all households were made up of individuals, and 2.4% had someone living alone who was 65 years of age or older. The average household size was 2.31 and the average family size was 2.46.

In the city, the population was spread out, with 13.4% under the age of 18, 5.2% from 18 to 24, 23.7% from 25 to 44, 43.3% from 45 to 64, and 14.4% who were 65 years of age or older. The median age was 49 years. For every 100 females, there were 110.9 males. For every 100 females age 18 and over, there were 104.9 males.

The median income for a household in the city was $63,750, and the median income for a family was $71,750. Males had a median income of $50,750 versus $31,250 for females. The per capita income for the city was $27,891. There were 12.8% of families and 9.8% of the population living below the poverty line, including no under eighteens and none of those over 64.

== Education ==
The Oskaloosa Community School District operates local public schools.
