= Vennard College =

Coordinates: 41.287712°N 92.617368°W

Vennard College was a non-denominational Christian college located in University Park, Iowa, located just outside of Oskaloosa, Iowa. On November 12, 2008, it was announced that the college would close at the end of the fall semester due to declining enrollment and financial difficulties. The college held its final commencement on November 22, 2008 and is now closed.

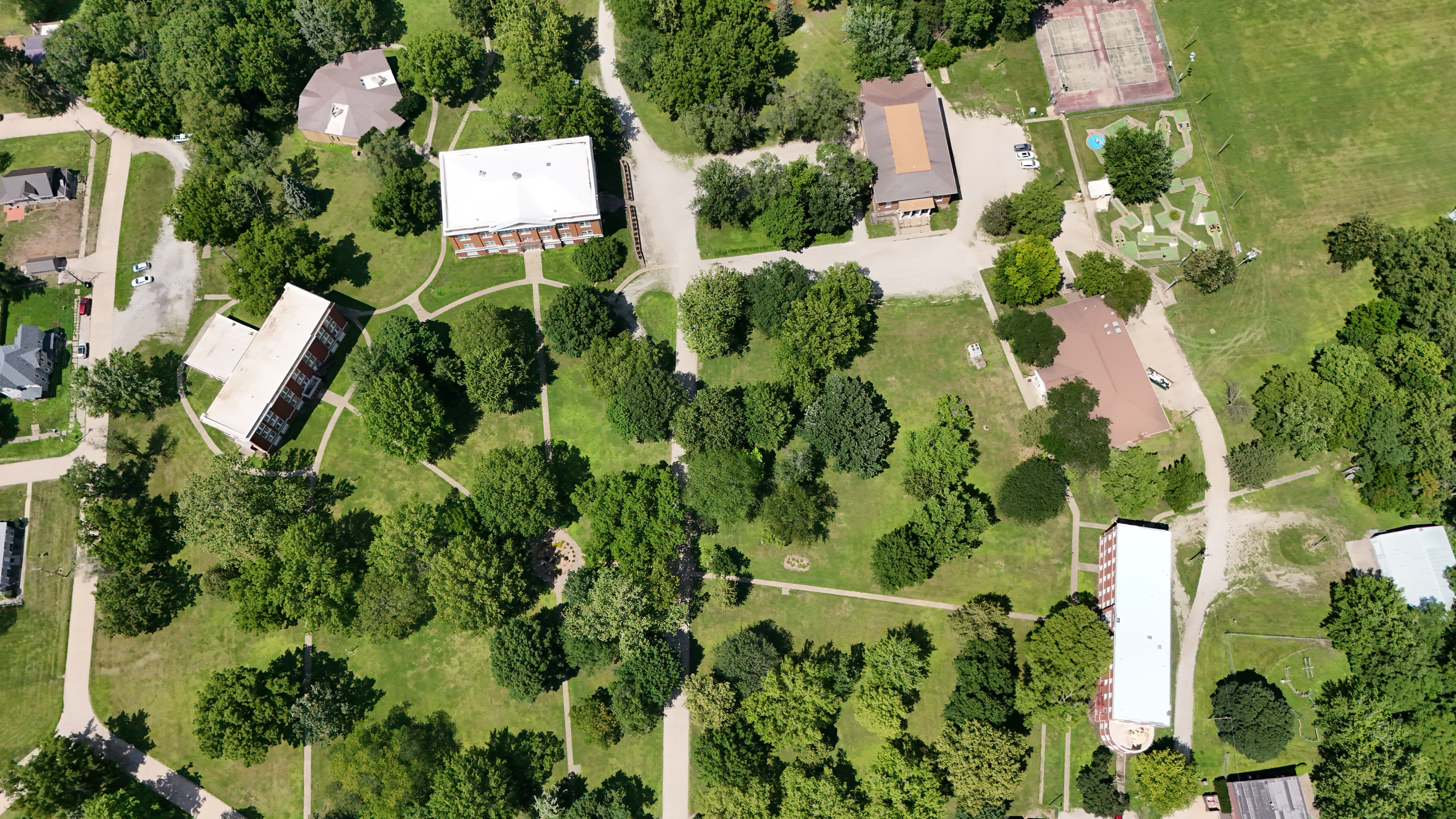
The former campus, photographed on June 28, 2025

== History ==
In 1910, Dr. Iva Durham Vennard founded Chicago Evangelistic Institute (CEI) in Chicago, Illinois, for the purpose of providing "effective training for Christian service." Her stated goals were to send Spirit-filled people into the ministry and to promote Scriptural Holiness.

In 1951, the school moved to University Park, Iowa, where it was renamed Vennard College in 1959. The move to the beautiful, rural setting brought Vennard into a familial relationship with the graduates of the three other Christian colleges which formerly occupied the campus: Central Holiness University, John Fletcher College, and Kletzing College.

Dr. Vennard's presidency was followed by the leadership of Dr. Harry E. Jessop. Presidents of Vennard College have included Dr. H. M. Couchenour, Dr. J. Sutherland Logan, Dr. Merne A. Harris, Dr. Warthen T. Israel, Dr. Burnis Bushong (interim president) and Dr. Blake J. Neff.

In 1996, Vennard College was newly incorporated to continue the tradition of Christian higher education on this historic campus with Dr. W. Edward Rickman as president. In 2002, Dr. Bruce E. Moyer picked up the reins of leadership; but the College was unable to remain open.

In 2007, reports emerged that the college knowingly housed a convicted sex offender on campus, less than 1000 feet from a day care center.

According to the Des Moines Register, Vennard College announced on November 12, 2008, that it would close at the end of the 2008 fall semester. The academic records have been transferred to the University of Iowa, and the transcripts can be obtained from the Registrar's Office of the University of Iowa.

Vennard College archives have been transferred to MidAmerica Nazarene University in Olathe, KS.

== Athletics ==
Vennard's mascot was the Cougar and the official school colors were purple and white.

Vennard College offered intercollegiate sports in men and women’s basketball, women’s volleyball and men’s soccer. Vennard College was a member of NCCAA Division II and the Midwest Christian College Conference. All teams were eligible for conference and post season tournaments. Individual players were eligible for All Conference, All Region and All American Teams.

== Recreation ==
Vennard College boasted many opportunities to participate in a variety of intramural sports that included dodge ball and indoor soccer. The campus was home to a miniature golf course that was open to the public. The miniature golf course is still in operation and open to the public.

== Notable alumni ==
- Harold Sherk (1903-1974), Christian pacifist, and David Engbrecht, retired pastor at Nappanee Missionary Church.
