= Beacon, Iowa =

- City
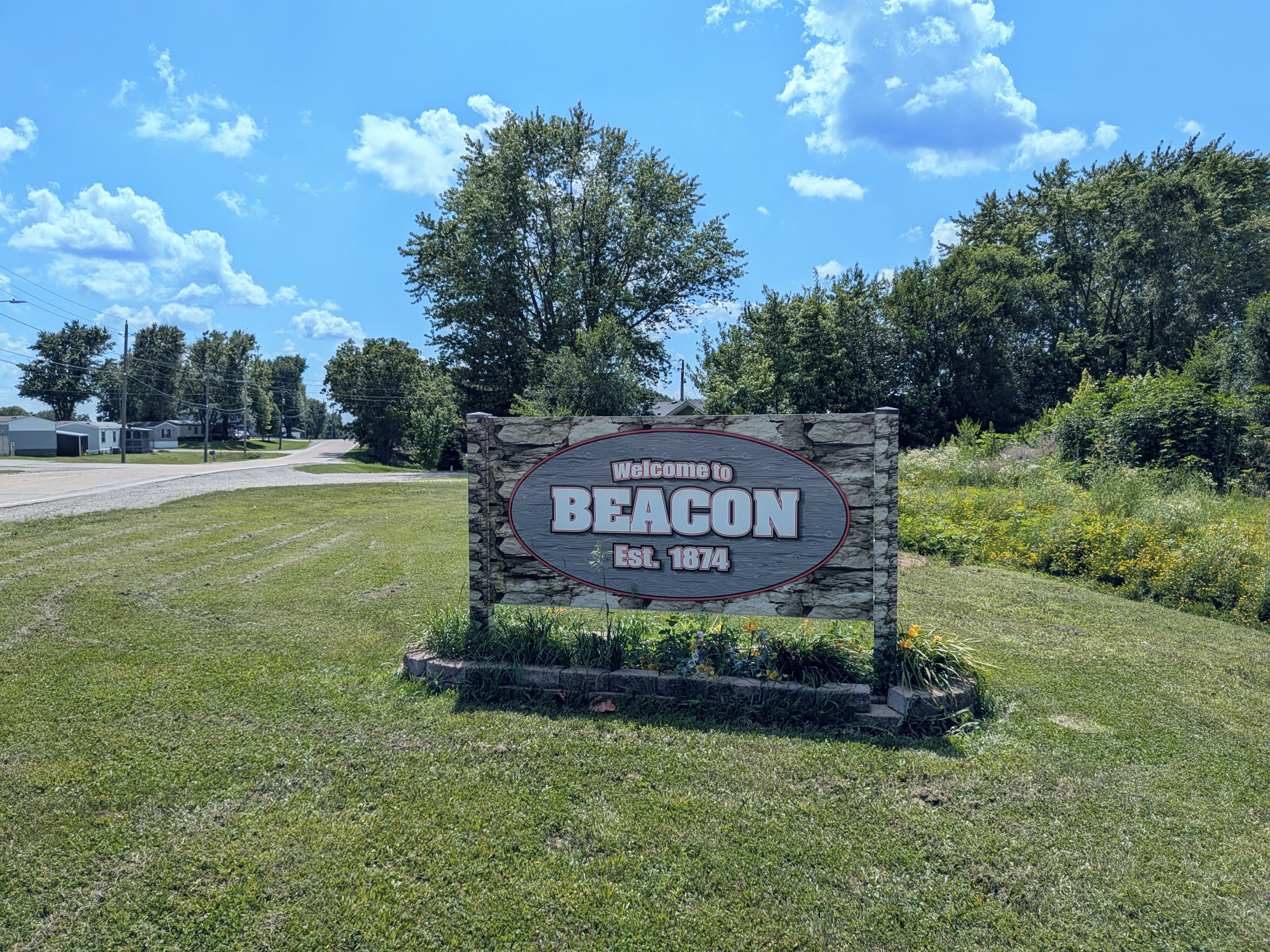
- Welcome Sign in Beacon

- Location of Beacon, Iowa
- Coordinates: 41°16′34″N 92°40′52″W
- Country: United States
- State: Iowa
- County: Mahaska

Area
  - Total: 1.01 sq mi (2.61 km^{2})
  - Land: 1.01 sq mi (2.61 km^{2})
  - Water: 0 sq mi (0.00 km^{2})
- Elevation: 745 ft (227 m)

Population (2020)
  - Total: 445
  - Density: 441.3/sq mi (170.39/km^{2})
- Time zone: UTC-6 (Central (CST))
  - Summer (DST): UTC-5 (CDT)
- ZIP code: 52534
- Area code: 641
- FIPS code: 19-05050
- GNIS feature ID: 2394092

Beacon is a city in Mahaska County, Iowa, United States. The population was 445 at the 2020 census.

== History ==
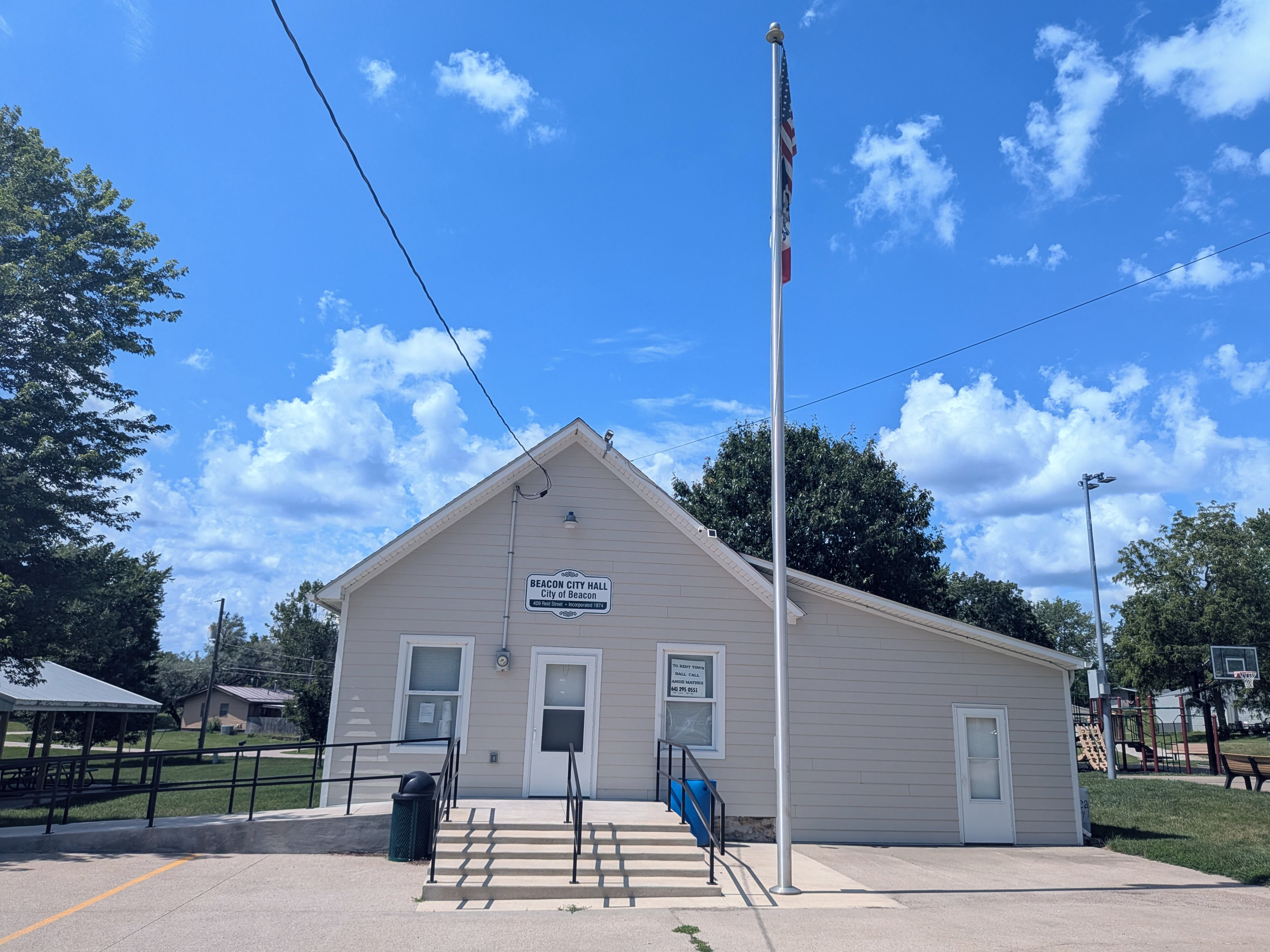
City Hall

Coal miners in Beacon joined the United Mine Workers union in 1894, organizing local 178. By 1902, this had 100 members.

Evans, Iowa was a coal camp 3 miles (4.8 km) to the northwest founded by Evan Evans. This was home to mines that opened in 1879 and were combined and reorganized as the American mine in 1884, at which time, the daily output was 100 tons. By 1894, the mine face was 1.5 miles (2.4 km) from the foot of the slope, and the mine was producing 1000 tons of coal a day from a coal seam 6 feet (1.8 m) thick. This was one of the very few mines where the miners did not join the Bituminous coal miners' strike of 1894. In 1899 United Mine Workers of America local 835 was organized, and in 1902, local 1932 was organized. Memberships in these two locals, combined, was 210 in 1901.

== Geography ==
According to the United States Census Bureau, the city has a total area of 1.00 square mile (2.59 km^{2}), all of it land.

== Demographics ==
Historical populations
Year	Pop.	±%
1880	727	—
1890	570	−21.6%
1900	953	+67.2%
1910	623	−34.6%
1920	381	−38.8%
1930	350	−8.1%
1940	382	+9.1%
1950	371	−2.9%
1960	718	+93.5%
1970	338	−52.9%
1980	530	+56.8%
1990	509	−4.0%
2000	518	+1.8%
2010	494	−4.6%
2020	445	−9.9%
Source:"U.S. Census website". United States Census Bureau. and Iowa Data Center; Source: U.S. Decennial Census

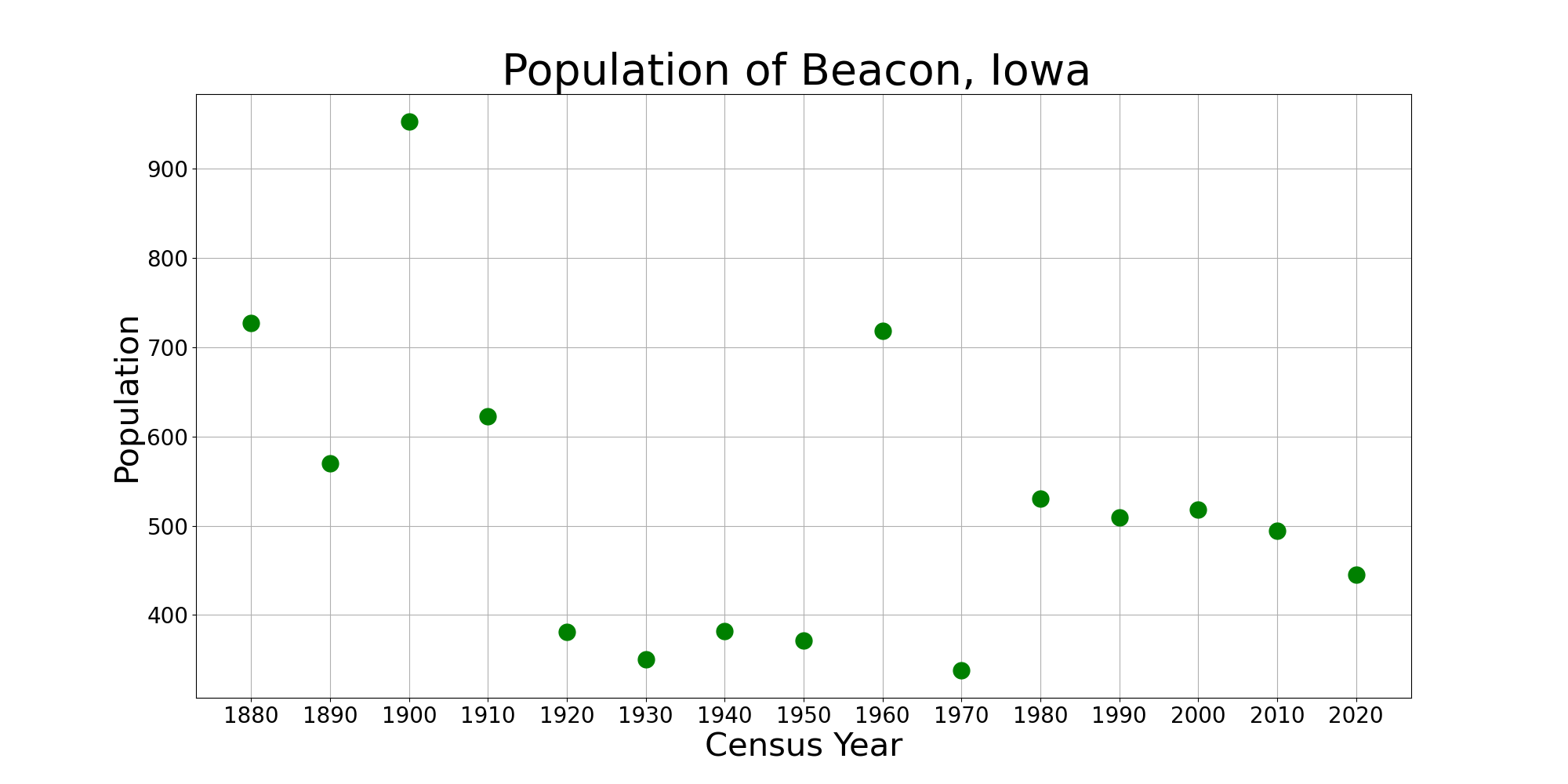
The population of Beacon, Iowa from US census data

=== 2020 census ===
As of the census of 2020, there were 445 people, 194 households, and 118 families residing in the city. The population density was 441.3 inhabitants per square mile (170.4/km^{2}). There were 212 housing units at an average density of 210.2 per square mile (81.2/km^{2}). The racial makeup of the city was 92.4% White, 0.0% Black or African American, 0.0% Native American, 1.8% Asian, 0.2% Pacific Islander, 0.0% from other races and 5.6% from two or more races. Hispanic or Latino persons of any race comprised 1.3% of the population.

Of the 194 households, 28.4% of which had children under the age of 18 living with them, 42.8% were married couples living together, 11.3% were cohabitating couples, 22.7% had a female householder with no spouse or partner present and 23.2% had a male householder with no spouse or partner present. 39.2% of all households were non-families. 30.4% of all households were made up of individuals, 18.0% had someone living alone who was 65 years old or older.

The median age in the city was 47.3 years. 24.0% of the residents were under the age of 20; 4.7% were between the ages of 20 and 24; 18.0% were from 25 and 44; 32.1% were from 45 and 64; and 21.1% were 65 years of age or older. The gender makeup of the city was 50.1% male and 49.9% female.

=== 2010 census ===
As of the census of 2010, there were 494 people, 213 households, and 144 families living in the city. The population density was 494.0 inhabitants per square mile (190.7/km^{2}). There were 237 housing units at an average density of 237.0 per square mile (91.5/km^{2}). The racial makeup of the city was 98.0% White, 0.6% African American, 1.2% Native American, and 0.2% from two or more races. Hispanic or Latino of any race were 2.0% of the population.

There were 213 households, of which 27.7% had children under the age of 18 living with them, 50.7% were married couples living together, 10.3% had a female householder with no husband present, 6.6% had a male householder with no wife present, and 32.4% were non-families. 27.7% of all households were made up of individuals, and 8% had someone living alone who was 65 years of age or older. The average household size was 2.32 and the average family size was 2.76.

The median age in the city was 41 years. 23.5% of residents were under the age of 18; 5.3% were between the ages of 18 and 24; 26% were from 25 to 44; 29% were from 45 to 64; and 16.4% were 65 years of age or older. The gender makeup of the city was 50.8% male and 49.2% female.

=== 2000 census ===
As of the census of 2000, there were 518 people, 208 households, and 153 families living in the city. The population density was 514.5 inhabitants per square mile (198.6/km^{2}). There were 217 housing units at an average density of 215.5 per square mile (83.2/km^{2}). The racial makeup of the city was 96.53% White, 0.39% African American, 0.58% Native American, and 2.51% from two or more races. Hispanic or Latino of any race were 0.39% of the population.

There were 208 households, out of which 31.7% had children under the age of 18 living with them, 57.2% were married couples living together, 11.1% had a female householder with no husband present, and 26.0% were non-families. 21.2% of all households were made up of individuals, and 6.7% had someone living alone who was 65 years of age or older. The average household size was 2.49 and the average family size was 2.85.

In the city, the population was spread out, with 25.1% under the age of 18, 10.4% from 18 to 24, 27.6% from 25 to 44, 23.9% from 45 to 64, and 12.9% who were 65 years of age or older. The median age was 35 years. For every 100 females, there were 109.7 males. For every 100 females age 18 and over, there were 100.0 males.

The median income for a household in the city was $32,000, and the median income for a family was $35,469. Males had a median income of $31,500 versus $26,641 for females. The per capita income for the city was $16,972. About 5.5% of families and 8.8% of the population were below the poverty line, including 8.7% of those under age 18 and 16.4% of those age 65 or over.

== Education ==
The Oskaloosa Community School District operates local public schools.
