= Mahaska County, Iowa =

County in Iowa, United States

- County
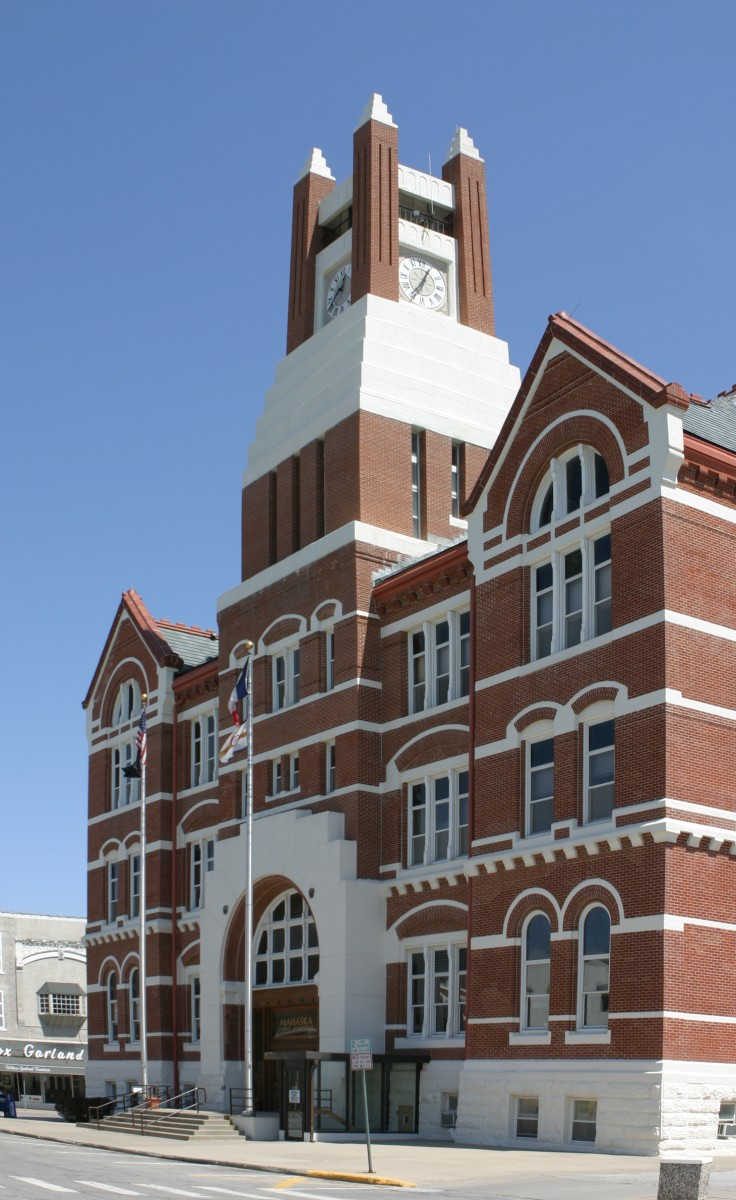
- The courthouse in Oskaloosa, built 1886, is on the NRHP. The architect was Henry C. Koch.

- Location within the U.S. state of Iowa
- Coordinates: 41°20′02″N 92°38′44″W
- Country: United States
- State: Iowa
- Founded: February 17, 1843
- Named for: Chief Mahaska
- Seat: Oskaloosa
- Largest city: Oskaloosa

Area
  - Total: 573 sq mi (1,480 km^{2})
  - Land: 571 sq mi (1,480 km^{2})
  - Water: 2.5 sq mi (6.5 km^{2}) 0.4%

Population (2020)
  - Total: 22,190
  - Estimate (2025): 21,880 ▼
  - Density: 38.9/sq mi (15.0/km^{2})
- Time zone: UTC−6 (Central)
  - Summer (DST): UTC−5 (CDT)
- Congressional district: 1st
- Website: www.mahaskacountyia.gov
- Iowa county number 62

Mahaska County is a county located in the U.S. state of Iowa. As of the 2020 census, the population was 22,190. The county seat is Oskaloosa.

Mahaska County comprises the Oskaloosa, IA Micropolitan Statistical Area.

== History ==
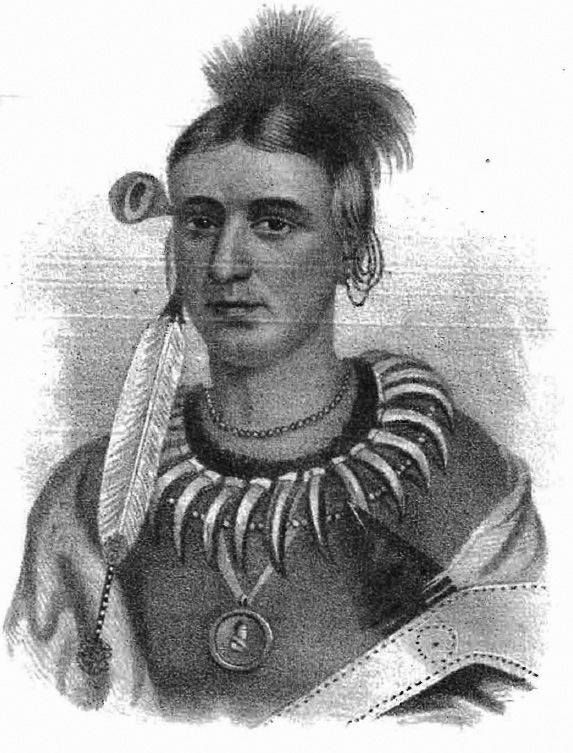
Mahaska, from Fulton's Red Men of Iowa (1882)

Mahaska County was formed in February 1843. The county has been self-governing since February 5, 1844. It was named after chief Mahaska of the Iowa people. The county was the first in Iowa to have a sheriff and a justice of peace.

The first courthouse was completed in January 1846. When a larger structure was required, the second courthouse was constructed in 1885–86, first being used on February 27, 1886. The first school, a small log cabin one-half mile (ca. 2 km) east of Oskaloosa, was opened on September 16, 1844, and the Cumberland Presbyterian Church opened as the first church in 1846. On July 2, 1850, the first edition of the Iowa Herald was issued (today the Oskaloosa Herald). The first tracks of the Des Moines Valley Railroad were laid through the county in 1864.

Coal mining was once a major industry in Mahaska County. During the 19th century, Muchakinock, about 5 miles (8.0 km) south of Oskaloosa, was probably the largest and most prosperous coal camp in Iowa.

== Geography ==
According to the United States Census Bureau, the county has a total area of 573 square miles (1,480 km^{2}), of which 571 square miles (1,480 km^{2}) is land and 2.5 square miles (6.5 km^{2}) (0.4%) is water.

=== Major highways ===
- U.S. Highway 63
- Iowa Highway 23
- Iowa Highway 92
- Iowa Highway 163
- Iowa Highway 146
- Iowa Highway 149

=== Adjacent counties ===
- Jasper County (northwest)
- Poweshiek County (north)
- Keokuk County (east)
- Wapello County (southeast)
- Monroe County (southwest)
- Marion County (west)

== Demographics ==
Historical population
Census	Pop.	Note	%±
1850	5,989		—
1860	14,816		147.4%
1870	22,508		51.9%
1880	25,202		12.0%
1890	28,805		14.3%
1900	34,273		19.0%
1910	29,860		−12.9%
1920	26,270		−12.0%
1930	25,804		−1.8%
1940	26,485		2.6%
1950	24,672		−6.8%
1960	23,602		−4.3%
1970	22,177		−6.0%
1980	22,867		3.1%
1990	21,532		−5.8%
2000	22,335		3.7%
2010	22,381		0.2%
2020	22,190		−0.9%
2025 (est.)	21,880	▼	−1.4%
U.S. Decennial Census; 1790–1960 1900–1990; 1990–2000 2010–2020

=== 2020 census ===
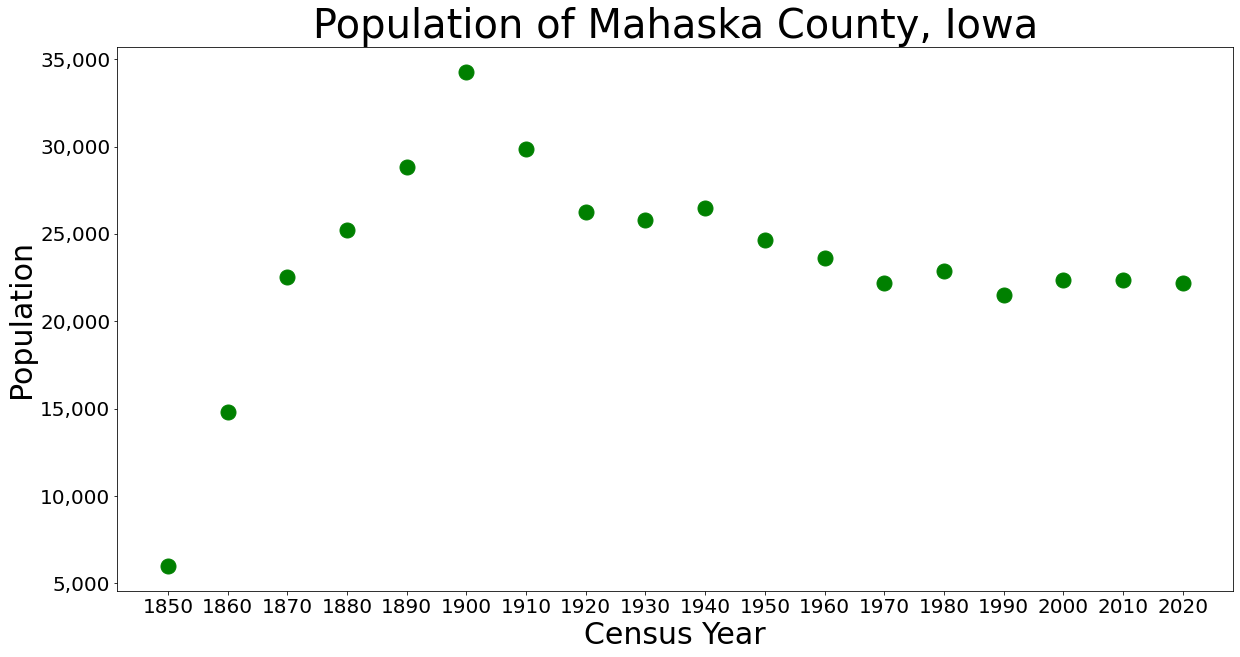
Population of Mahaska County from the U.S. census data

As of the 2020 census, the county had a population of 22,190, a population density of 38.8/sq mi (15.0/km^{2}), and 96.02% of residents reported being of one race.

The median age was 39.7 years. 23.7% of residents were under the age of 18 and 19.3% of residents were 65 years of age or older. For every 100 females there were 99.2 males, and for every 100 females age 18 and over there were 97.2 males age 18 and over.

The racial makeup of the county was 92.2% White, 1.8% Black or African American, 0.2% American Indian and Alaska Native, 1.1% Asian, 0.1% Native Hawaiian and Pacific Islander, 0.7% from some other race, and 4.0% from two or more races. Hispanic or Latino residents of any race comprised 2.2% of the population.

56.5% of residents lived in urban areas, while 43.5% lived in rural areas.

There were 8,799 households in the county, of which 29.7% had children under the age of 18 living in them. Of all households, 51.7% were married-couple households, 18.3% were households with a male householder and no spouse or partner present, and 22.9% were households with a female householder and no spouse or partner present. About 28.2% of all households were made up of individuals and 13.1% had someone living alone who was 65 years of age or older. There were 9,680 housing units, of which 9.1% were vacant. Among occupied housing units, 71.4% were owner-occupied and 28.6% were renter-occupied. The homeowner vacancy rate was 1.7% and the rental vacancy rate was 7.1%.

=== 2010 census ===
As of the 2010 census recorded a population of 22,381 in the county, with a population density of 39.2/sq mi (15.1/km^{2}). There were 9,766 housing units, of which 8,975 were occupied.

=== 2000 census ===
As of the 2000 census, there were 22,335 people, 8,880 households, and 6,144 families residing in the county. The population density was 39 people per square mile (15 people/km^{2}). There were 9,551 housing units at an average density of 17 units per square mile (6.6 units/km^{2}). The racial makeup of the county was 97.20% White, 0.64% Black or African American, 0.19% Native American, 0.86% Asian, 0.03% Pacific Islander, 0.30% from other races, and 0.78% from two or more races. 0.85% of the population were Hispanic or Latino of any race.

There were 8,880 households, out of which 32.40% had children under the age of 18 living with them, 58.60% were married couples living together, 7.50% had a female householder with no husband present, and 30.80% were non-families. 26.60% of all households were made up of individuals, and 12.40% had someone living alone who was 65 years of age or older. The average household size was 2.45 and the average family size was 2.96.

In the county, the population was spread out, with 25.70% under the age of 18, 9.40% from 18 to 24, 26.80% from 25 to 44, 21.70% from 45 to 64, and 16.30% who were 65 years of age or older. The median age was 37 years. For every 100 females there were 99.10 males. For every 100 females age 18 and over, there were 96.90 males.

The median income for a household in the county was $37,314, and the median income for a family was $43,557. Males had a median income of $32,618 versus $23,192 for females. The per capita income for the county was $18,232. About 7.50% of families and 9.80% of the population were below the poverty line, including 11.70% of those under age 18 and 9.30% of those age 65 or over.

== Communities ==
=== Cities ===
- Barnes City
- Beacon
- Eddyville
- Fremont
- Keomah Village
- Leighton
- New Sharon
- Oskaloosa
- Rose Hill
- University Park

=== Unincorporated communities ===
- Cedar
- Evans
- Hopewell
- Indianapolis
- Lacey
- Lakonta
- Olivet
- Peoria
- Taintor
- Tioga
- Union Mills
- Wright

=== Townships ===
- Adams
- Black Oak
- Cedar
- East Des Moines
- Garfield
- Harrison
- Jefferson
- Lincoln
- Madison
- Monroe
- Pleasant Grove
- Prairie
- Richland
- Scott
- Spring Creek
- Union
- West Des Moines
- White Oak

=== Population ranking ===
The population ranking of the following table is based on the 2020 census of Mahaska County.

† county seat

Rank	City/Town/etc.	Municipal type	Population (2020 Census)	Population (2024 Estimate)
1	† Oskaloosa	City	11,558	11,569
2	New Sharon	City	1,262	1,280
3	Eddyville (partially in Monroe and Wapello Counties)	City	970	984
4	Fremont	City	708	718
5	University Park	City	487	492
6	Beacon	City	445	455
7	Leighton	City	158	155
8	Rose Hill	City	157	153
9	Barnes City (partially in Poweshiek County)	City	156	151
10	Keomah Village	City	110	138

== Politics ==
Mahaska County is a strongly Republican county. Only six Republican Party presidential candidates from 1880 to the present day have failed to win the county, most recently Barry Goldwater in 1964 in his landslide loss statewide & nationally to Lyndon B. Johnson.

United States presidential election results for Mahaska County, Iowa
Year	Republican		Democratic		Third party(ies)	
Year	No.	%	No.	%	No.	%
1896	4,256	50.69%	3,974	47.33%	166	1.98%
1900	4,480	53.90%	3,596	43.26%	236	2.84%
1904	4,091	59.57%	2,287	33.30%	489	7.12%
1908	3,326	48.51%	3,035	44.27%	495	7.22%
1912	1,682	26.09%	2,576	39.95%	2,190	33.96%
1916	3,143	48.14%	3,151	48.26%	235	3.60%
1920	6,739	64.55%	3,339	31.98%	362	3.47%
1924	5,810	55.11%	1,673	15.87%	3,060	29.02%
1928	7,368	69.09%	3,200	30.00%	97	0.91%
1932	4,655	43.45%	5,586	52.14%	472	4.41%
1936	5,270	44.94%	6,094	51.97%	362	3.09%
1940	6,123	51.12%	5,757	48.07%	97	0.81%
1944	5,123	50.86%	4,652	46.19%	297	2.95%
1948	4,238	46.93%	4,327	47.92%	465	5.15%
1952	7,369	63.95%	3,745	32.50%	409	3.55%
1956	6,864	62.21%	3,965	35.93%	205	1.86%
1960	7,129	65.40%	3,746	34.36%	26	0.24%
1964	3,787	37.11%	6,396	62.68%	22	0.22%
1968	5,670	56.87%	3,721	37.32%	579	5.81%
1972	6,374	63.82%	3,382	33.86%	232	2.32%
1976	5,267	51.38%	4,838	47.20%	146	1.42%
1980	5,650	54.52%	3,968	38.29%	745	7.19%
1984	6,086	59.13%	4,107	39.90%	100	0.97%
1988	4,798	51.48%	4,451	47.76%	71	0.76%
1992	4,953	48.34%	3,714	36.24%	1,580	15.42%
1996	4,473	50.03%	3,737	41.80%	731	8.18%
2000	5,971	62.57%	3,370	35.31%	202	2.12%
2004	6,858	63.93%	3,790	35.33%	80	0.75%
2008	6,271	57.35%	4,464	40.83%	199	1.82%
2012	6,448	59.25%	4,213	38.71%	222	2.04%
2016	7,432	69.90%	2,619	24.63%	581	5.46%
2020	8,297	72.76%	2,894	25.38%	213	1.87%
2024	8,207	74.98%	2,577	23.54%	162	1.48%

== See also ==
- Mahaska County Courthouse
- National Register of Historic Places listings in Mahaska County, Iowa
