= Oskaloosa, Iowa =

City in the United States

- City
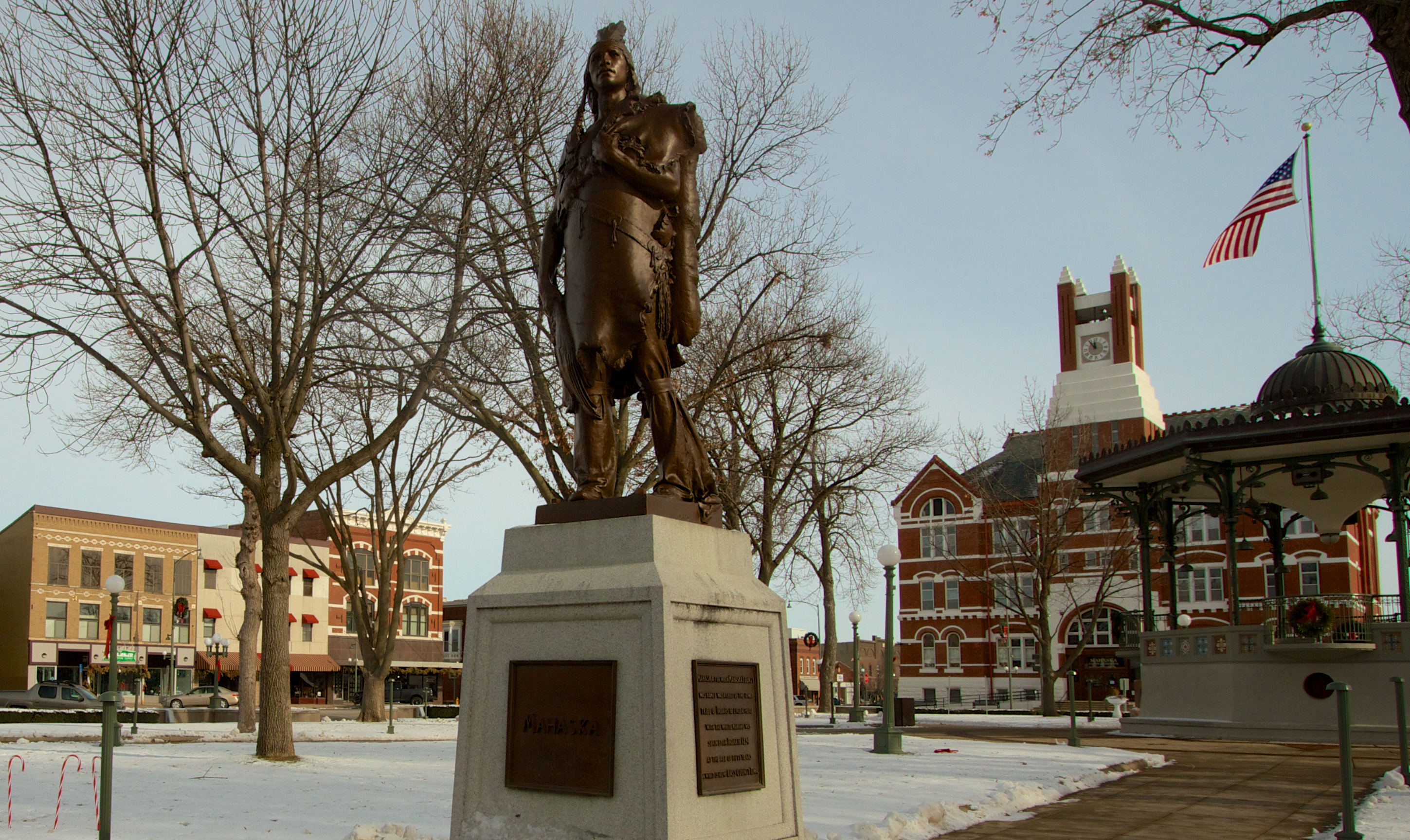
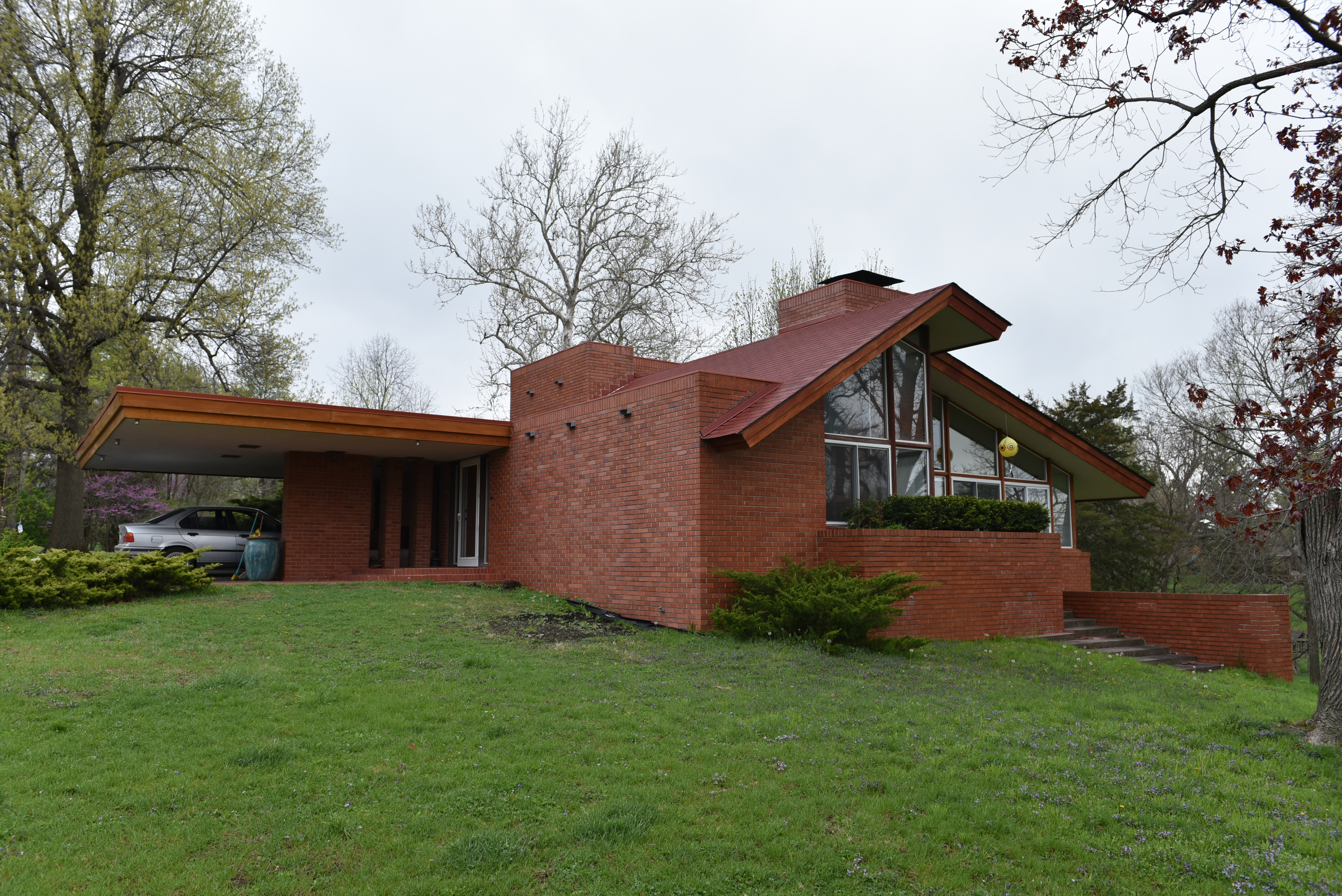
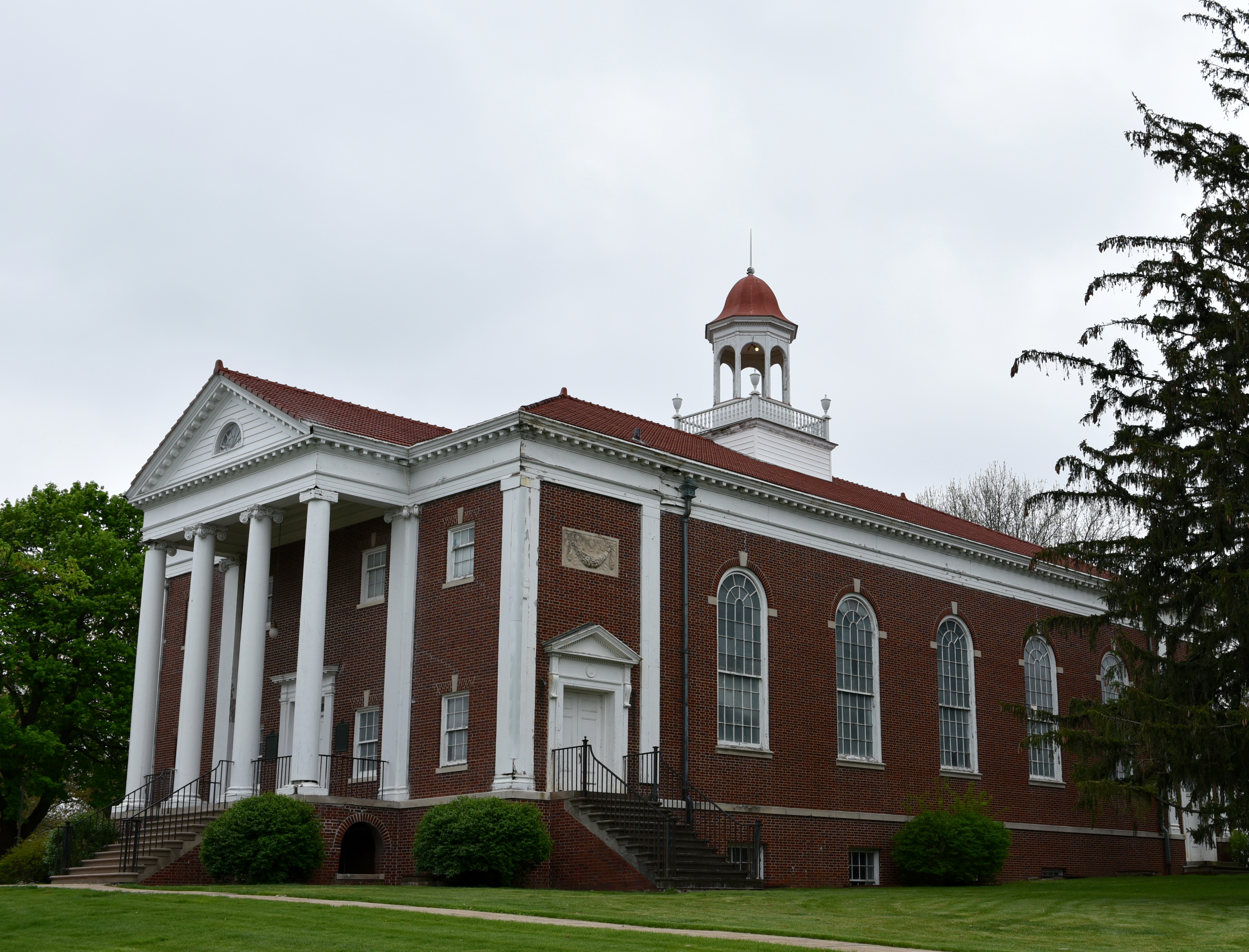
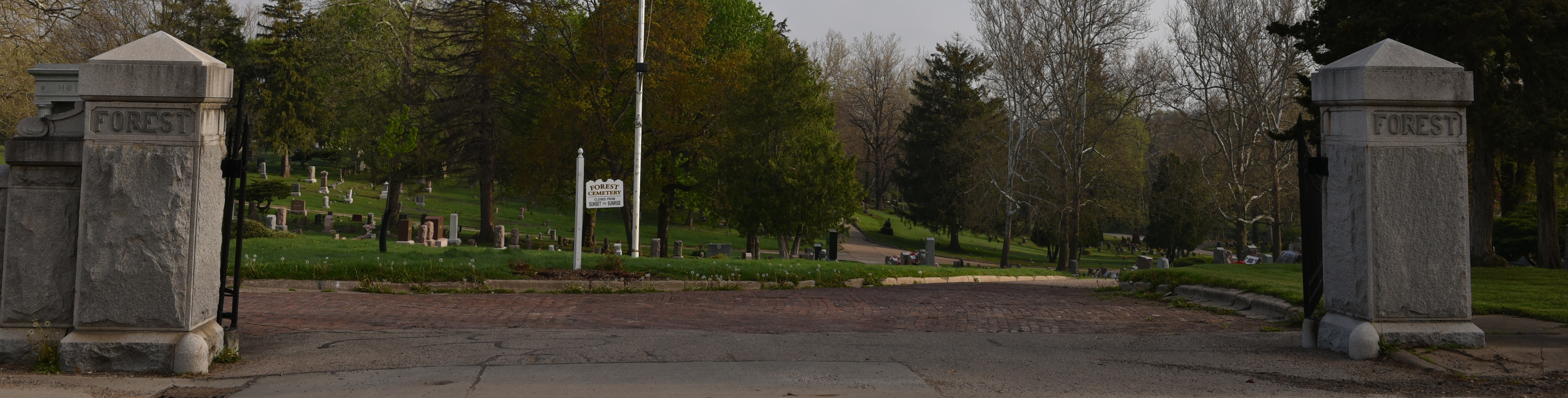
- Statue of Mahaska and County Courthouse Carroll Alsop House William Penn University Forest Cemetery

- Logo
- Nickname: Osky
- Motto: "Note the Difference"
- Location of Oskaloosa, Iowa

- Location in the United States Oskaloosa (the United States)
- Coordinates: 41°17′31″N 92°38′25″W
- Country: United States
- State: Iowa
- County: Mahaska
- Incorporated: February 4, 1875

Area
  - Total: 8.03 sq mi (20.81 km^{2})
  - Land: 8.02 sq mi (20.77 km^{2})
  - Water: 0.015 sq mi (0.04 km^{2})
- Elevation: 846 ft (258 m)

Population (2020)
  - Total: 11,558
  - Density: 1,441.0/sq mi (556.38/km^{2})
- Time zone: UTC-6 (Central (CST))
  - Summer (DST): UTC-5 (CDT)
- ZIP code: 52577
- Area code: 641
- FIPS code: 19-59925
- GNIS feature ID: 468480
- Website: www.oskaloosaiowa.org

Oskaloosa is a city in, and the county seat of, Mahaska County, Iowa. The population was 11,558 in the 2020 U.S. census. In the late nineteenth and early twentieth century, Oskaloosa was a national center of bituminous coal mining. Today, Oskaloosa is home to William Penn University, a private university, and Lake Keomah State Park which is located four miles east of the city.

== History ==
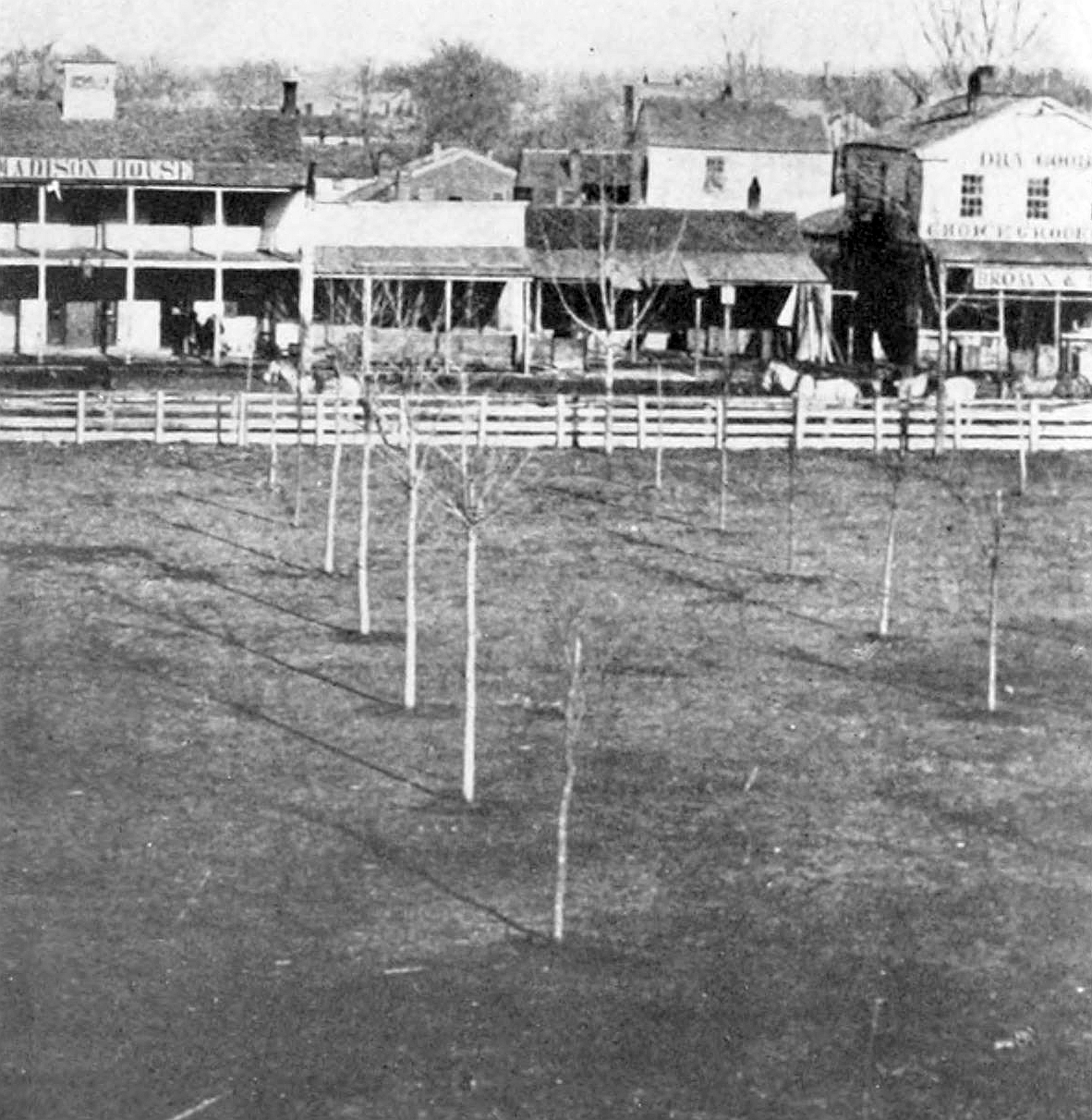
East side of public square, 1864

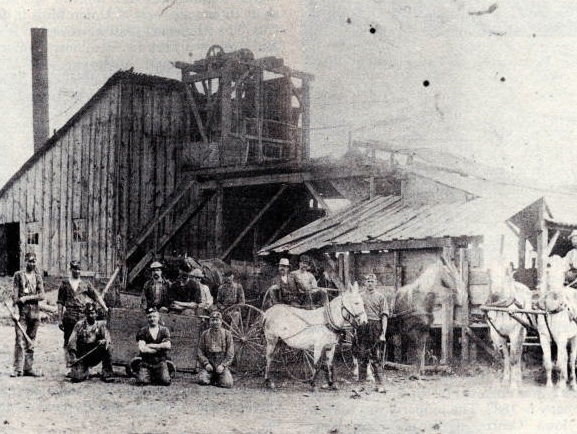
The Sam Smith coal mine in 1895, located in what is now the 1300 block of High Avenue West.

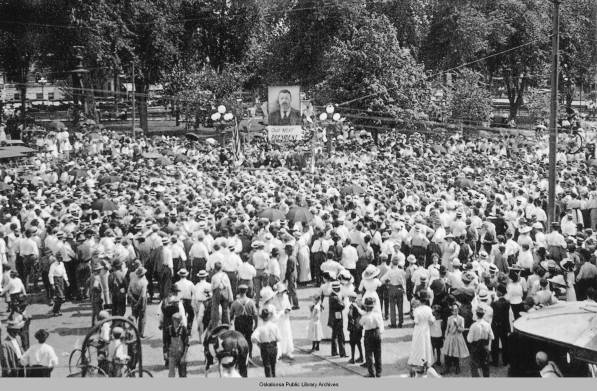
Theodore Roosevelt campaigns in the Oskaloosa city square in the fall of 1912.

Oskaloosa derives its name from Ouscaloosa who, according to town lore, was a Creek princess who married Seminole chief Osceola. A local tradition was that her name meant "last of the beautiful". (This interpretation of "last of the beautiful" is not correct. "Oskaloosa" in the Mvskoke-Creek language means "black rain", from the Mvskoke words "oske" (rain) and "lvste" (black). "loosa" is an English corruption of the Mvskoke word "lvste". For example, see the Wikipedia entry for Tuskaloosa, eponym of the town of Tuscaloosa, Alabama. In addition the Mvskoke word "Ouscaloosa" means "Black Water"). The first European-American settlers arrived in 1835, led by Nathan Boone, youngest son of frontiersman Daniel Boone. Acting on instructions from Stephen W. Kearny, he selected this as the first site of Fort Des Moines, located on a high ridge between the Skunk and Des Moines rivers. The ridge was originally called the Narrows.

The town was formally platted in 1844 when William Canfield moved his trading post from the Des Moines River to Oskaloosa. The town was designated by the legislature as the county seat in the same year.

The Des Moines Valley Railroad built north from Eddyville, Iowa through Oskaloosa to Pella, Iowa in 1864. In 1873, this became the Keokuk and Des Moines Railroad, and in 1887, it was leased by the Chicago, Rock Island and Pacific Railroad. The Central Iowa Railway followed, which became the Iowa Central Railway in 1888 and was absorbed by the Minneapolis and St. Louis Railway in 1901. In 1883, the Burlington and Western Railway reached Oskaloosa; this was a narrow gauge line that was widened to Standard Gauge in 1902 and then merged with the Chicago, Burlington and Quincy Railroad.

On January 6, 1882, most of the buildings in the north half of Oskaloosa were severely damaged and most of the plate glass windows in the area were broken by an explosion. Three boys were killed in the explosion. The boys had been seen shooting at the A. L. Spencer gunpowder magazine half a mile north of the town center.

The first bituminous coal mine in the area was opened shortly after 1853 by Robert Seevers, who drove a drift into a four-foot coalbed in an exposed creek bank east of town. Initially, coal was mined entirely for local consumption, but with the arrival of the railroads, coal from the region was shipped widely. In the 1880s, more than one million tons of coal was mined in the county from 38 mines. By 1887, the report of the state mine inspector listed 11 coal mines in or very close to Oskaloosa. By 1895, the coal output of Mahaska County surpassed that of all other Iowa counties, and production had reached more than one million tons per year. In 1911, coal mining was reported to be the primary industry in the region. In 1914, the Carbon Block Coal Company of Centerville produced more than 100,000 tons of coal, ranking among the top 24 coal producers in the state.

Several major coal-mining camps were located in the Oskaloosa area. Muchakinock was approximately five miles south of town, on the banks of the Muchakinock Creek. Lost Creek was a company town and post office with a population of about 500 in 1905, located about 10 miles south of town. On January 24, 1902, there was a mine explosion in the Lost Creek No. 2 mine. This was one of only two major mine disasters in Iowa between 1888 and 1913. A miner setting shots to blast coal from the coal face re-used a hole left over from a previous failed shot, and the result was a coal dust explosion that detonated barrels of gunpowder stored in the mine. Twenty men died on the site and 14 more were badly injured. The explosion sparked a statewide miner's strike. As a result, in April 1903, the legislature enacted a law to regulate blasting in coal mines.

== Geography ==
According to the United States Census Bureau, the city has a total area of 7.45 square miles (19.30 km^{2}), of which 7.43 square miles (19.24 km^{2}) is land and 0.02 square miles (0.05 km^{2}) is water.

=== Climate ===
According to the Köppen Climate Classification system, Oskaloosa has a hot-summer humid continental climate, abbreviated "Dfa" on climate maps.

Climate data for Oskaloosa, Iowa, 1991–2020 normals, extremes 1893–present
Month	Jan	Feb	Mar	Apr	May	Jun	Jul	Aug	Sep	Oct	Nov	Dec	Year
Record high °F (°C)	69 (21)	78 (26)	88 (31)	92 (33)	106 (41)	104 (40)	112 (44)	112 (44)	101 (38)	96 (36)	82 (28)	75 (24)	112 (44)
Mean maximum °F (°C)	53.1 (11.7)	58.3 (14.6)	73.1 (22.8)	81.5 (27.5)	86.9 (30.5)	90.9 (32.7)	94.5 (34.7)	93.4 (34.1)	90.1 (32.3)	83.6 (28.7)	69.2 (20.7)	57.7 (14.3)	96.4 (35.8)
Mean daily maximum °F (°C)	30.7 (−0.7)	35.9 (2.2)	49.3 (9.6)	62.2 (16.8)	72.2 (22.3)	81.5 (27.5)	85.5 (29.7)	83.8 (28.8)	77.4 (25.2)	64.5 (18.1)	49.3 (9.6)	36.2 (2.3)	60.7 (16.0)
Daily mean °F (°C)	21.5 (−5.8)	25.9 (−3.4)	38.3 (3.5)	50.1 (10.1)	61.5 (16.4)	71.2 (21.8)	75.2 (24.0)	72.9 (22.7)	65.2 (18.4)	52.8 (11.6)	38.9 (3.8)	27.2 (−2.7)	50.1 (10.0)
Mean daily minimum °F (°C)	12.2 (−11.0)	15.9 (−8.9)	27.3 (−2.6)	38.1 (3.4)	50.8 (10.4)	60.8 (16.0)	64.8 (18.2)	62.0 (16.7)	53.0 (11.7)	41.2 (5.1)	28.5 (−1.9)	18.2 (−7.7)	39.4 (4.1)
Mean minimum °F (°C)	−10.0 (−23.3)	−4.4 (−20.2)	6.7 (−14.1)	23.0 (−5.0)	36.0 (2.2)	48.0 (8.9)	54.1 (12.3)	51.5 (10.8)	38.0 (3.3)	25.6 (−3.6)	11.5 (−11.4)	−2.4 (−19.1)	−13.7 (−25.4)
Record low °F (°C)	−31 (−35)	−31 (−35)	−30 (−34)	6 (−14)	24 (−4)	36 (2)	44 (7)	36 (2)	20 (−7)	3 (−16)	−7 (−22)	−30 (−34)	−31 (−35)
Average precipitation inches (mm)	1.75 (44)	1.74 (44)	2.15 (55)	3.92 (100)	4.71 (120)	5.18 (132)	4.40 (112)	5.08 (129)	3.56 (90)	2.68 (68)	2.20 (56)	1.35 (34)	38.72 (984)
Average snowfall inches (cm)	5.6 (14)	8.6 (22)	3.8 (9.7)	0.6 (1.5)	0.0 (0.0)	0.0 (0.0)	0.0 (0.0)	0.0 (0.0)	0.0 (0.0)	0.0 (0.0)	0.8 (2.0)	5.7 (14)	25.1 (63.2)
Average precipitation days (≥ 0.01 in)	5.6	6.0	7.0	10.0	11.5	10.2	8.5	8.8	7.2	7.4	6.3	6.1	94.6
Average snowy days (≥ 0.1 in)	3.3	3.5	1.4	0.3	0.0	0.0	0.0	0.0	0.0	0.0	0.5	2.8	11.8
Source 1: NOAA (average snowfall/snow days 1981–2010)
Source 2: National Weather Service

== Demographics ==
Historical population
Census	Pop.	Note	%±
1850	625		—
1860	4,393		602.9%
1870	3,204		−27.1%
1880	4,598		43.5%
1890	6,558		42.6%
1900	9,212		40.5%
1910	9,466		2.8%
1920	9,427		−0.4%
1930	10,123		7.4%
1940	11,024		8.9%
1950	11,124		0.9%
1960	11,053		−0.6%
1970	11,224		1.5%
1980	10,989		−2.1%
1990	10,632		−3.2%
2000	10,938		2.9%
2010	11,463		4.8%
2020	11,558		0.8%
U.S. Decennial Census

=== 2020 census ===
As of the 2020 census, Oskaloosa had a population of 11,558, with 4,664 households and 2,738 families. The population density was 1,441.0 inhabitants per square mile (556.4/km^{2}). There were 5,181 housing units at an average density of 646.0 per square mile (249.4/km^{2}), of which 10.0% were vacant. The homeowner vacancy rate was 2.2% and the rental vacancy rate was 7.5%.

Of households, 27.9% had children under the age of 18 living in them. Of all households, 42.5% were married-couple households, 19.9% were households with a male householder and no spouse or partner present, and 29.5% were households with a female householder and no spouse or partner present. Non-family households made up 41.3% of all households. About 34.1% of all households were made up of individuals, and 15.0% had someone living alone who was 65 years of age or older.

The median age was 37.3 years. 22.5% of residents were under the age of 18 and 19.4% were 65 years of age or older. The age distribution was 25.4% under 20, 9.2% from 20 to 24, 23.6% from 25 to 44, and 22.5% from 45 to 64. For every 100 females there were 94.5 males, and for every 100 females age 18 and over there were 91.9 males age 18 and over. The city's population was 48.6% male and 51.4% female.

99.3% of residents lived in urban areas, while 0.7% lived in rural areas.

Racial composition as of the 2020 census
Race	Number	Percent
White	10,277	88.9%
Black or African American	362	3.1%
American Indian and Alaska Native	25	0.2%
Asian	205	1.8%
Native Hawaiian and Other Pacific Islander	11	0.1%
Some other race	117	1.0%
Two or more races	561	4.9%
Hispanic or Latino (of any race)	349	3.0%

=== 2010 census ===
As of the census of 2010, there were 11,463 people, 4,715 households, and 2,842 families residing in the city. The population density was 1,542.8 inhabitants per square mile (595.7/km^{2}). There were 5,144 housing units at an average density of 692.3 per square mile (267.3/km^{2}). The racial makeup of the city was 94% White, 1.5% African American, 0.3% Native American, 1.5% Asian, 0.9% from other races, and 1.8% from two or more races. Hispanic or Latino of any race were 2.4% of the population.

There were 4,715 households, of which 29.7% had children under the age of 18 living with them, 44.0% were married couples living together, 12.2% had a female householder with no husband present, 4.1% had a male householder with no wife present, and 39.7% were non-families. 33.3% of all households were made up of individuals, and 15.1% had someone living alone who was 65 years of age or older. The average household size was 2.30 and the average family size was 2.92.

The median age in the city was 35.8 years. 23.4% of residents were under the age of 18; 13.1% were between the ages of 18 and 24; 23.3% were from 25 to 44; 23.2% were from 45 to 64; and 17.1% were 65 years of age or older. The gender makeup of the city was 48.8% male and 51.2% female.

=== 2000 census ===
As of the census of 2000, there were 10,938 people, 4,603 households, and 2,863 families residing in the city. The population density was 1,593.8 inhabitants per square mile (615.4/km^{2}). There were 4,945 housing units at an average density of 720.5 per square mile (278.2/km^{2}). The racial makeup of the city was 96.00% White, 1.04% African American, 0.25% Native American, 1.32% Asian, 0.04% Pacific Islander, 0.41% from other races, and 0.94% from two or more races. Hispanic or Latino of any race were 1.26% of the population.

There were 4,603 households, out of which 29.4% had children under the age of 18 living with them, 49.2% were married couples living together, 10.1% had a female householder with no husband present, and 37.8% were non-families. 32.8% of all households were made up of individuals, and 15.7% had someone living alone who was 65 years of age or older. The average household size was 2.28 and the average family size was 2.89.

Population spread: 24.1% under the age of 18, 11.2% from 18 to 24, 26.2% from 25 to 44, 19.9% from 45 to 64, and 18.5% who were 65 years of age or older. The median age was 36 years. For every 100 females, there were 94.9 males. For every 100 females age 18 and over, there were 91.3 males.

The median income for a household in the city was $34,490, and the median income for a family was $42,138. Males had a median income of $33,830 versus $23,698 for females. The per capita income for the city was $18,721. About 10.6% of families and 13.7% of the population were below the poverty line, including 18.0% of those under age 18 and 11.6% of those age 65 or over.

== Economy ==
The city's top ten companies (by number of employees) are as follows:

Employer	Date Founded	Type of Business	Approximate Number of Employees	Description of Services
Musco Lighting	1976	Sports Lighting	450	Provides permanent and temporary lighting for major sports venues around the world.
Oskaloosa Community Schools		Education	375	Includes a high school, middle school, elementary school, preschool and alternative school.
Mahaska Health Partnership	1907	Healthcare Services	450	Offers surgical services, inpatient services, a birthing Center, and emergency services.
Clow Valve Company	1878	Manufacturing	350	The Oskaloosa plants include iron and brass foundries, a machine shop, assembly, finished goods warehousing, shipping and administrative offices. Their primary products include fire hydrants and a variety of valves.
Wal-Mart	1962	Retail Department Store	265	
William Penn University	1873	Education	300	A private, liberal arts university.
City of Oskaloosa	1844	Municipal Government	199	
Hy-Vee	1930	Retail Food Store	155	An employee-owned chain of supermarkets located in the Midwestern United States.
Cunningham Incorporated	1969	Mechanical Contractor-Commercial, Industrial	100	Sheetmetal manufacturing, HVAC, geo-thermal, plumbing-piping, architectural metal-roofing, industrial services, and duct cleaning.
Mahaska Bottling Company		Soft Drinks	97	Pepsi-Cola bottling company.

- Source: LocationOne Information Systems website and telephone survey conducted February 2010

Oskaloosa is also the headquarters of the music publisher C.L. Barnhouse Company.

== Arts and culture ==
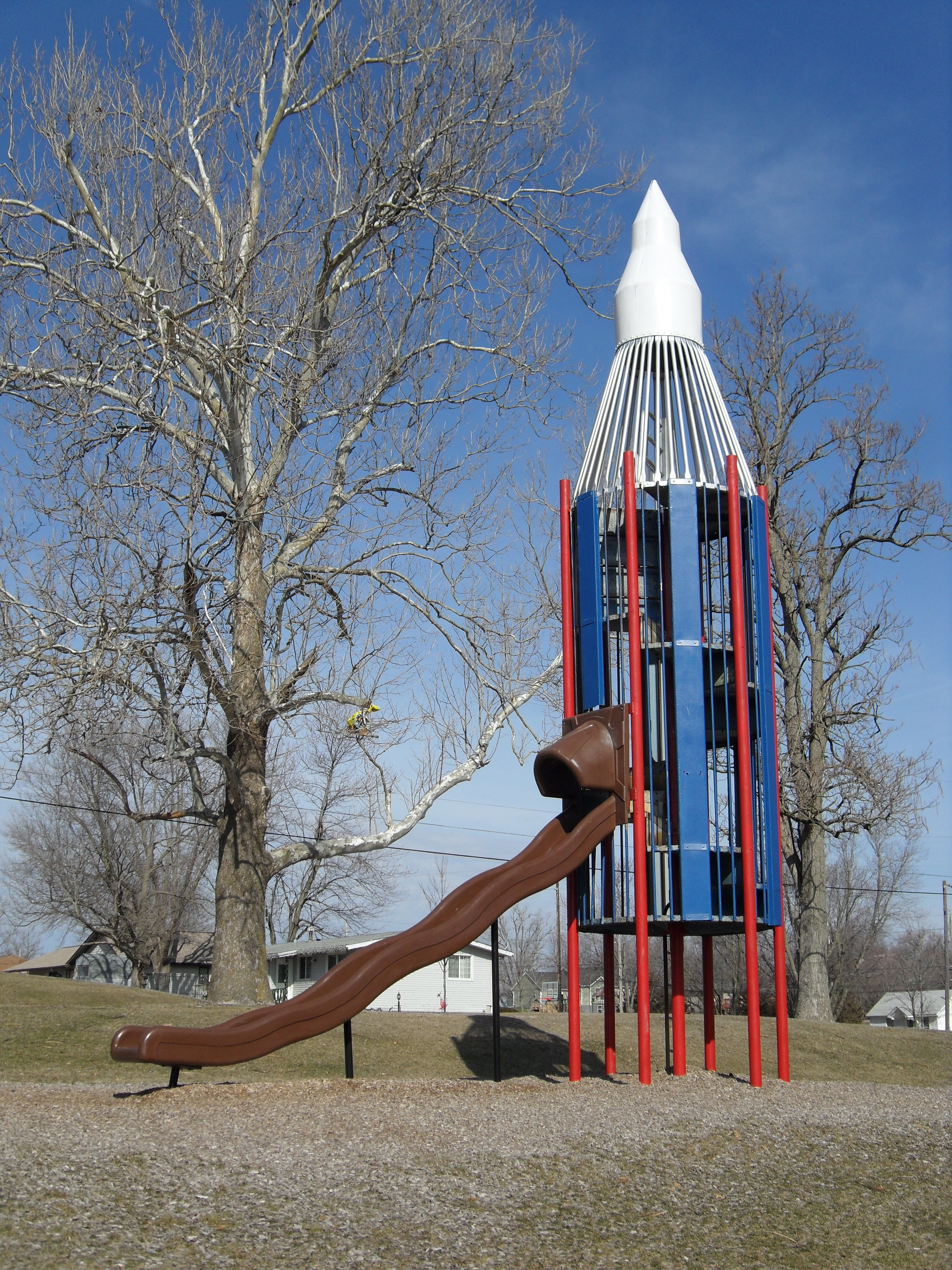
A rare example of Cold War playground equipment at Edmundson Park in Oskaloosa

=== Annual events ===
The Southern Iowa Fair is one of the largest traditional county fairs in Iowa and is held each July.

Art on the Square is held each June on the city square. This event features local and regional artists.

Sweet Corn Serenade is held each July on the city square. A concert by the municipal band is the highlight of the corn-on-the-cob and pork burger feast.

Each December, the Lighted Christmas Parade travels through the downtown area on two consecutive nights. The floats in the parade are adorned with lights for the after-dark event.

== Government and politics ==
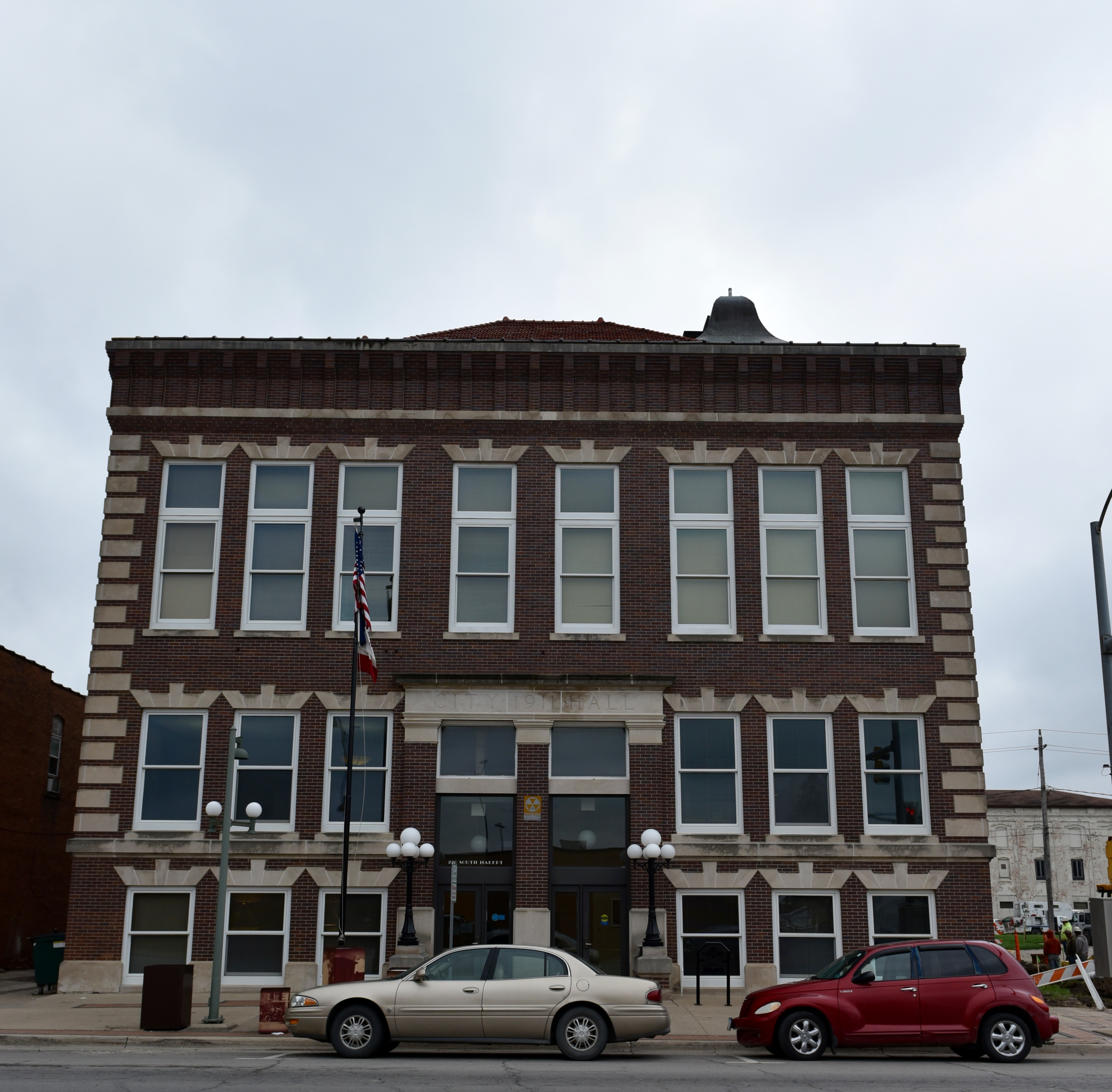
Oskaloosa City Hall

The City of Oskaloosa has a mayor-city council-city manager form of government under a home rule charter. The mayor and city council are elected. The city council is composed of seven members who make decisions regarding rules and regulations pertaining to Oskaloosa. The mayor is elected for a two-year term and council members are elected to serve for four years. The city manager is appointed by the city council.

Oskaloosa is a sister city with Shpola, Ukraine.

In July 2015, presidential candidate Donald Trump held a campaign event, a family picnic, at Oskaloosa's George Daily Community Auditorium. He did not give press credentials to the Des Moines Register for the event, due to its having had an editorial urging him to drop out of the race.

In November 2019, presidential candidate Joe Biden held a campaign event at William Penn University.

== Education ==
Oskaloosa is the home of William Penn University, a private, liberal arts college. It was founded by members of the Religious Society of Friends (Quakers) in 1873 as Penn College. In 1933, the name was changed to William Penn College, and finally to William Penn University in 2000.

Oskaloosa was the home of the now-defunct Oskaloosa College.

The city's public system, Oskaloosa Community School District, operates a high school, middle school, elementary school, and an alternative school. Oskaloosa Elementary opened in January 2005, merging five smaller buildings scattered across the city. The building is the largest elementary school in Iowa.

Also in Oskaloosa is Oskaloosa Christian Grade School, which was founded in 1946. SonShine Preschool started later, and is in the same building.

== Transportation ==
Transit services in the city are provided by Oskaloosa Rides. Free bus service is provided along one fixed-route loop in the city, on Mondays, Wednesdays and Fridays from 9:00 AM to 5:30 PM. Paratransit services operated by 10-15 Transit are provided daily.

== Distinctions ==
In the city's town square is a bronze statue of Mahaska, the 19th-century leader of a Native American tribe called the Ioway; he was memorialized by the name of Mahaska County. Restored in the 21st century, the statue was completed in 1907 by an Iowa-born sculptor named Sherry Edmundson Fry (1879–1966). At the time it was commissioned, Fry was living in Paris. He returned to Iowa the following summer to make preparatory drawings of Meskwaki at the nearby Settlement at Tama, Iowa, and to collect Indian artifacts and other reference materials. Returning to Paris, he began on a clay scale model, which he first showed at the Paris Salon in 1907. A year later, Fry exhibited the final full-sized sculpture, for which he won the Prix de Rome. Soon after, it was shipped to the United States, and arrived in Oskaloosa by railroad in September. The formal dedication of the statue was held on May 12, 1909, and attended by a crowd of about 12,000 people.

Oskaloosa boasts two private homes designed in 1948–51 by American architect Frank Lloyd Wright. Typical of his Usonian homes, these are the Carroll Alsop House at 1907 A Ave E and the Jack Lamberson House at 511 North Park Avenue.

Oskaloosa hosted the Iowa State Fair in 1858 and 1859, prior to the Civil War.

In 1934, Oskaloosa became the first city in the United States to fingerprint all of its citizens, including children.

== Municipal Band and historic bandstand ==
The first settlers in the area brought along their instruments and a deep love of music. Residents organized a town band in 1864. In 1880, the band was called the K. T. Band (for Knight Templars). In approximately 1882, the city erected a double-deck bandstand in the center of the city park. The band had started playing in the city park when it was just a field. A brick walk through the park was constructed with money raised from a local talent minstrel show. In 1886, the Knee Gahh Band went to St. Louis for their national conclave and was a tremendous hit. That marked the beginning of the band's prominence in the Midwest.

Charles L. Barnhouse developed the band "atmosphere" from the time he came to Oskaloosa in 1891. He exerted a creative influence to build up a musical organization that would become the pride of the city. His band garnered statewide acclaim, becoming the official band of the Iowa State Fair for four years. In 1904, the band played at the annual National Encampment of the Grand Army of the Republic in Louisville, Kentucky. En route, it played by invitation at the World's Fair in Saint Louis, Missouri. In the ensuing years the band became popular throughout Iowa and other states.

In 1907 and 1908, Oskaloosa had two bands playing concerts – the Iowa Brigade Band and LaRue's Band. The merchants on High Avenue West employed their own band to compete with the Iowa Brigade Band in the park on Saturday evenings.

In 1911, the citizens decided to beautify the city and voted to fund improvements for the city park. The citizens recommended a new bandstand be erected in the center of the park. The old double-deck frame bandstand was moved to one side to be used while the new bandstand was being built. The first concert in the new bandstand was played on June 1, 1912, and the bandstand was dedicated on July 25, 1912.

== Notable people ==
- Eddie Anderson, football head coach at University of Iowa 1939–42, 1946–49
- Alfred Balk, magazine editor
- Bill S. Ballinger, author and screenwriter
- Steve Bell, former ABC News anchor
- Natalia Maree Belting, author
- Max Bennett, jazz musician
- Charles Brookins, track and field athlete
- Elaine Christy, harpist
- Bernard A. Clarey, Admiral, among most decorated U.S. Navy officers; Admiral Clarey Bridge in Pearl Harbor named after him
- Chester Conklin, comedian and actor
- Marsena E. Cutts, politician
- Lisa Eagen, athlete, 1996 Atlanta Summer Olympics, team handball
- Dulah Marie Evans, painter, photographer, etcher
- Frank Friday Fletcher, Admiral, Medal of Honor recipient and namesake of the Fletcher-class destroyer
- Cliff Knox, Major League Baseball player
- John F. Lacey, U.S. Representative
- Tip Lamberson, flute maker
- Harry Hamilton Laughlin, eugenicist
- Lillian Miles, actress best known for her performance in the anti-marijuana film Reefer Madness
- Patrick O'Bryant, National Basketball Association player
- Arthur Russell, modern music composer
- Tyler Sash, defensive back for Iowa Hawkeyes and Super Bowl champion with the NFL's New York Giants
- Emma Steghagen, labor organizer and suffragist
- John H. Stek, translator of New International Version Bible
- Cecil W. Stoughton, photographer who served as the first Chief Official White House Photographer
- Al Swearengen, proprietor of Gem Saloon in Deadwood, South Dakota, 1877–1899 (featured in HBO series Deadwood)
- Ed Thomas, football coach
- Guy Vander Linden, Iowa state representative, U.S. Marines Brigadier General
- Thomas Eugene Watson, U.S. Marines lieutenant general
- Clarence C. Wiley, ragtime music composer
- Roscoe B. Woodruff, U.S. Army general of World War II

== See also ==
- Oskaloosa Public Library
