= Alsop House =

Alsop House may refer to:

- Richard Alsop IV House, Middletown, Connecticut, also known as Alsop House and designated a National Historic Landmark under that name
- Carroll Alsop House, Oskaloosa, Iowa, a Frank Lloyd Wright-designed home
