= Cold War playground equipment =

Playground equipment during the space race

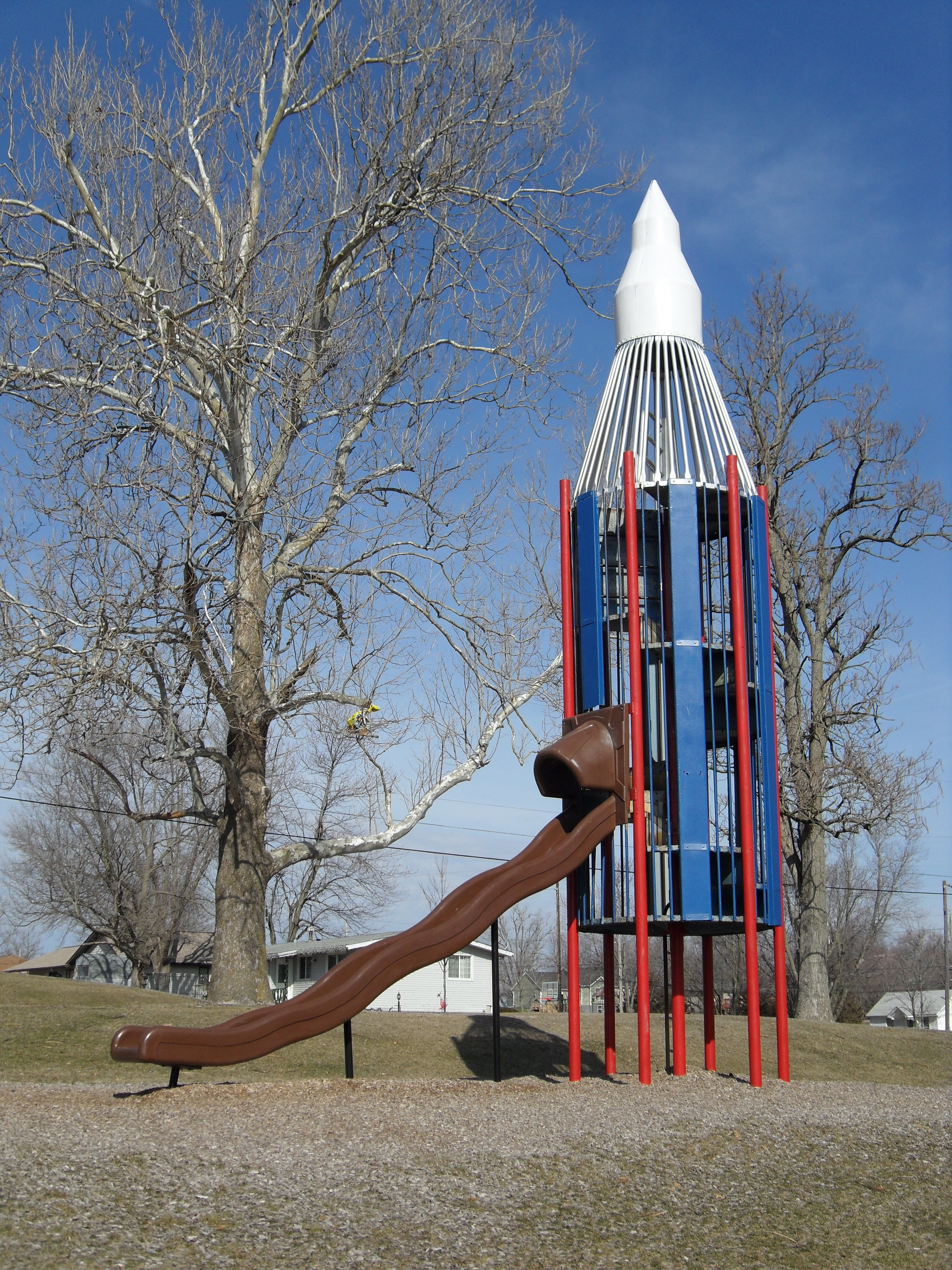
Rocket Slide in Oskaloosa, Iowa

Cold War playground equipment was intended to foster children's curiosity and excitement about the Space Race. It was installed during the Cold War in both communist and capitalist countries.

== United States ==
In 1959, Popular Mechanics wrote that a Kiwanis Club in Ontario, California, was "in tune with the times" when it erected a three-story rocketship in a local playground.

Around 1962, a 26-foot (7.9 m) high Moon rocket was installed in a playground in Calwa, California. The "Calwa Rocket", described as "an affectionate symbol of an earlier time", was designated a heritage property in 2013.

The "space-age shift" in playground design was described in a 1963 issue of Life magazine, which featured Fidel Castro on the cover. A row of tree trunks installed in a Kansas City, Missouri park could elicit "any game an imaginative child might think up," including "an array of ICBMs on a launch pad."

By 1963, Philadelphia had installed 160 space-aged playgrounds, which featured satellites, rockets, and submarines.

Richardson, Texas, installed a space-themed playground in 1965, with a radar tower, Saturn climber, submarine, radar dish, planet climber, and three-story high rocket ship. When the city tried to replace the playground equipment in 2008, it was met with local opposition. A task force established to investigate the removal found the rocket ship had "very limited play value," and had "hazardous conditions that present a great danger to young children." The playground equipment was dismantled despite the objections.

Two companies were noted for their military and space-themed playground equipment: Miracle Equipment Company of Grinnell, Iowa, and Jamison Fantasy Equipment of Los Angeles, California, which manufactured a moon rocket, nautilus submarine, and space slide.

Author Fraser MacDonald wrote "nuclear weapons were made intelligible in, and transposable to, a domestic context" through children's toys and playground equipment featuring Cold War symbols.

== Eastern Bloc ==
Playgrounds in the Soviet Union were also designed to stimulate children's excitement about space, as this was an ideology supported across Communist states. Eastern Europe "followed the Soviet playgrounds movement and was under the influence of the Cold War fashion."

The success of the Soviet space program was celebrated through monuments, parks and museums. In Baikonur, Kazakhstan, where Yuri Gagarin was launched into orbit in 1961, rocket-shaped playground equipment and other mementos of Soviet space exploration were installed around the village.

Playground equipment—including rockets—was usually mass-produced at large manufacturing plants which tended to follow repetitive designs and patterns. As a result, playgrounds across the Soviet sphere of influence often featured identical equipment, with "brutal construction" and "generous use of old tires."

== Gallery ==
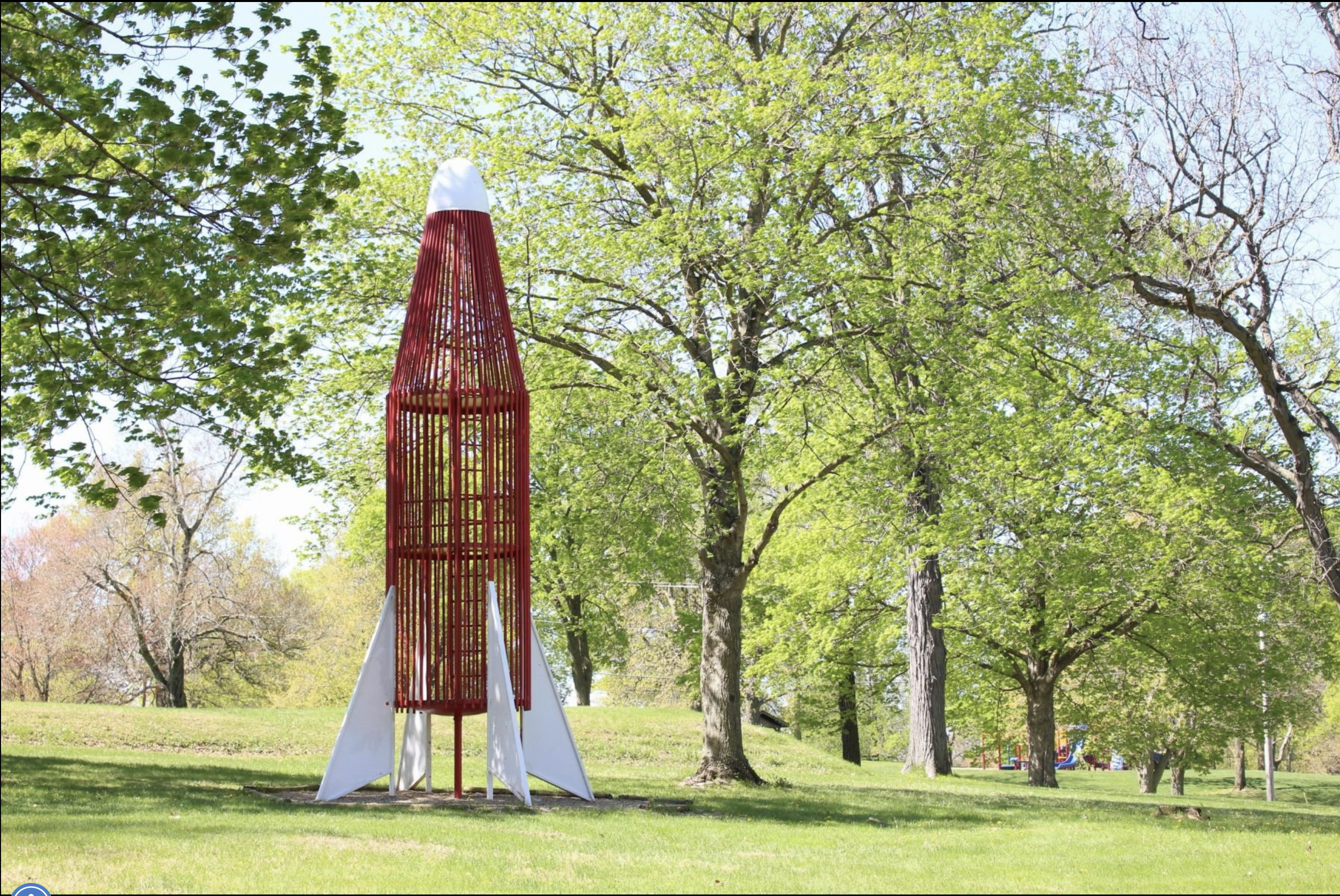
Space Rocket Slide in Glenwood Park, Macomb, IL

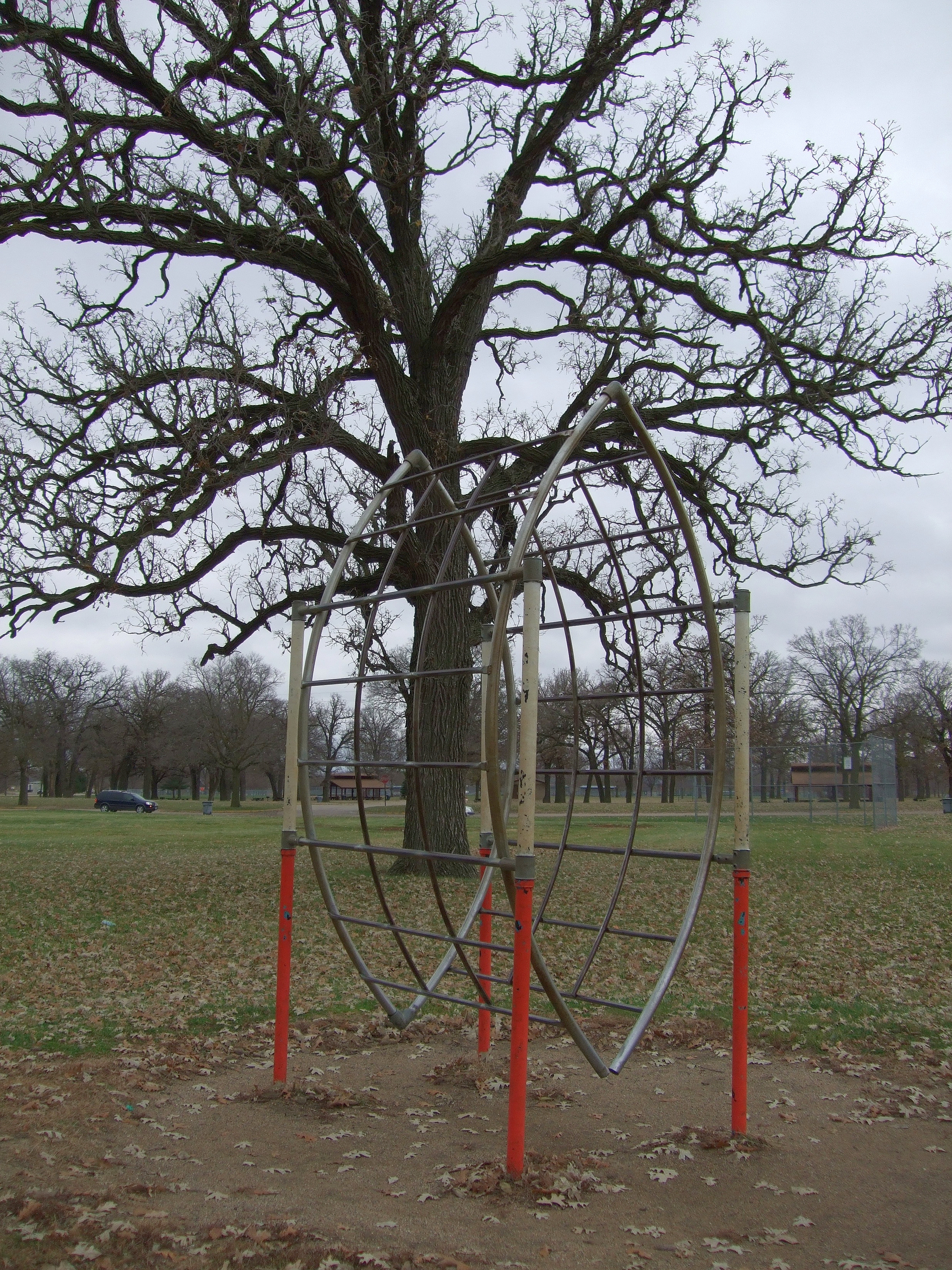
Radar climber in Riverside, Iowa, United States

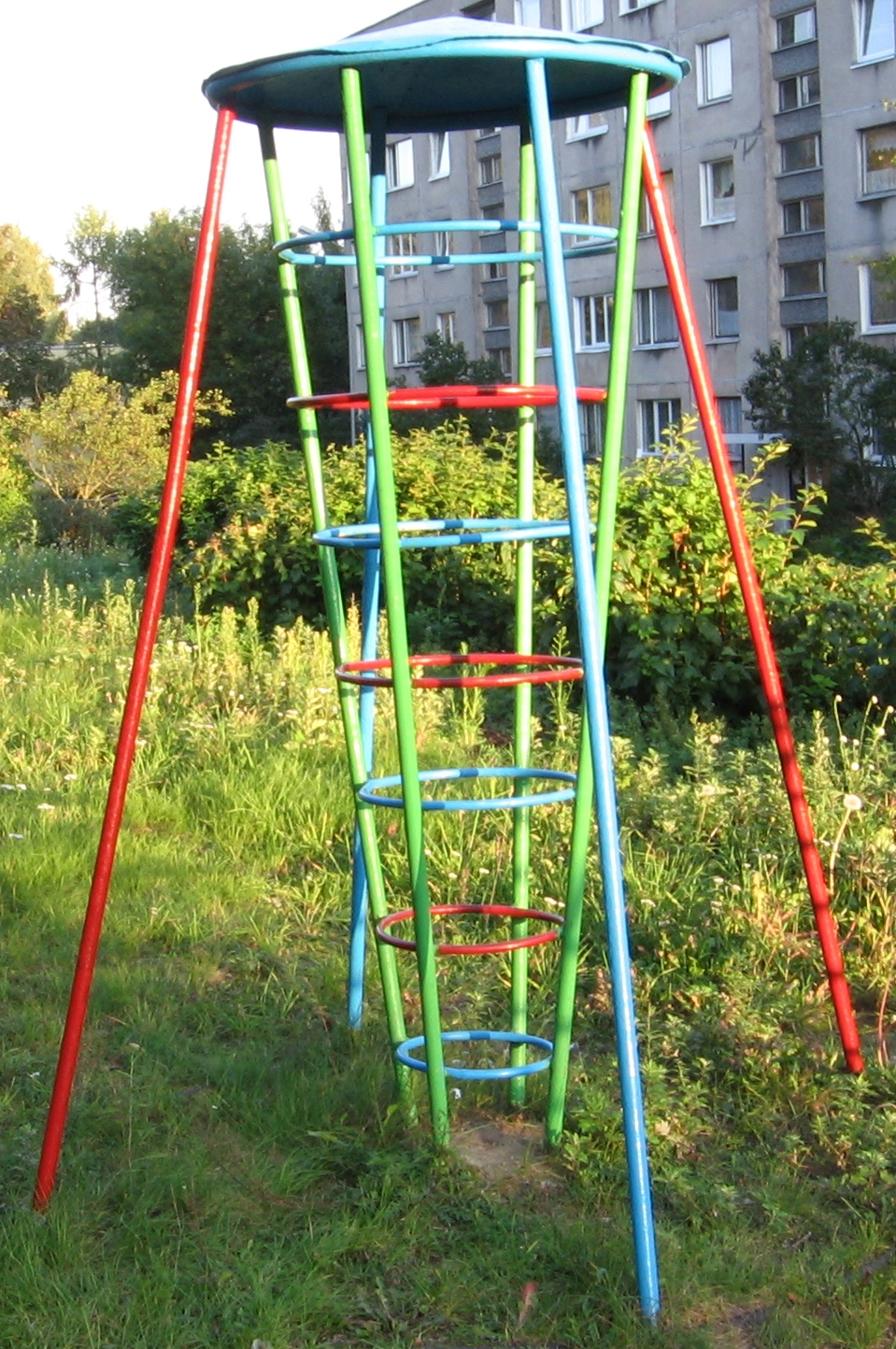
Soviet Space Probe

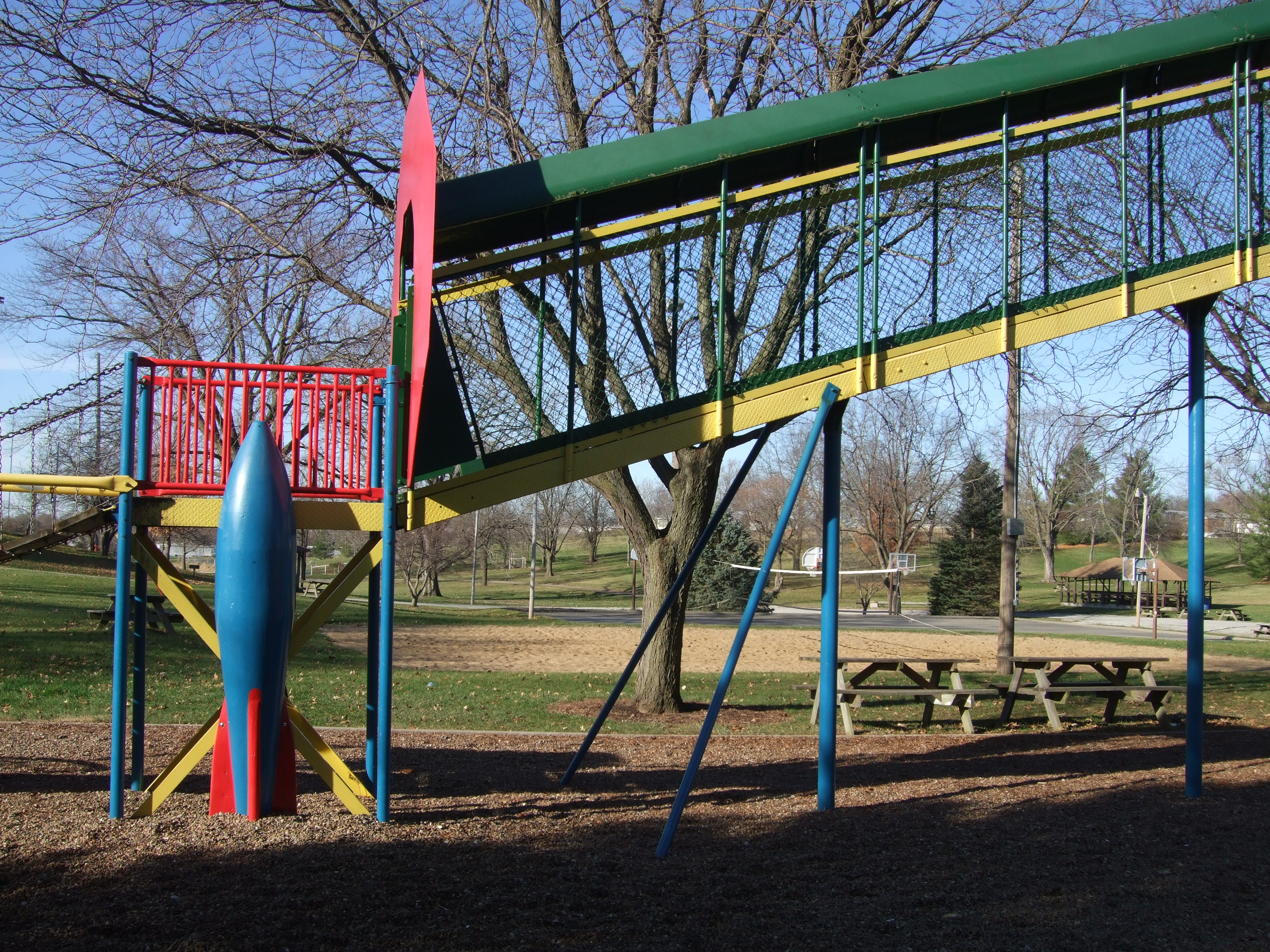
Missile in Washington, Iowa, United States

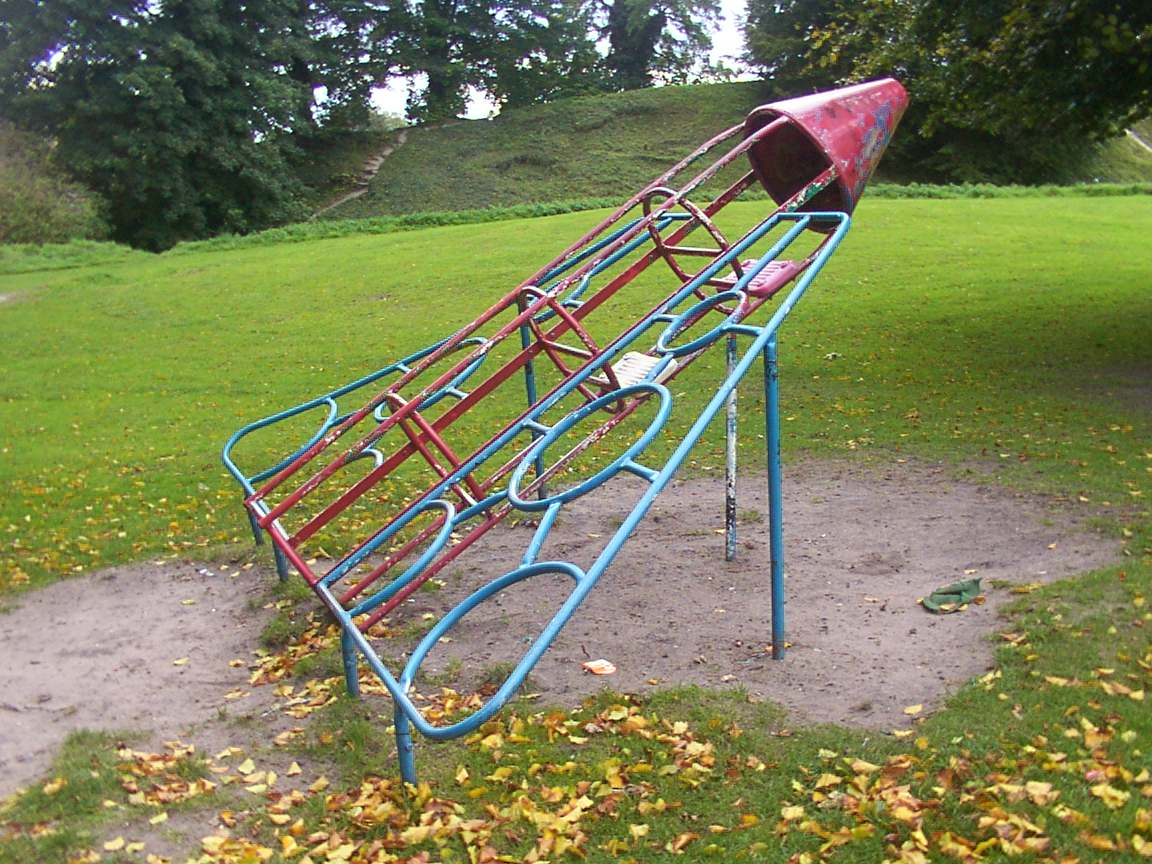
Rocket climbing frame in Thetford, England

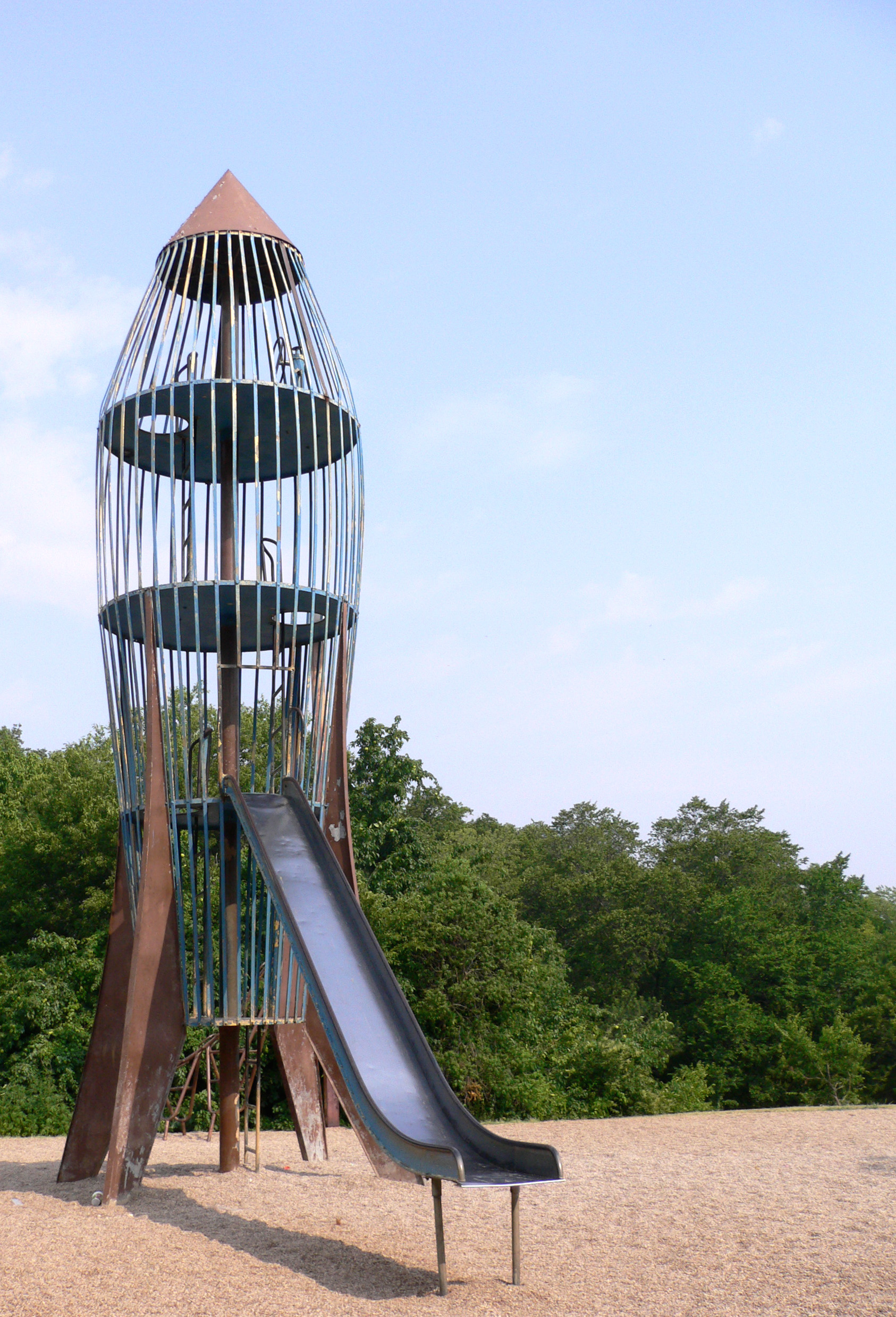
Rocket slide in Richardson, Texas, United States

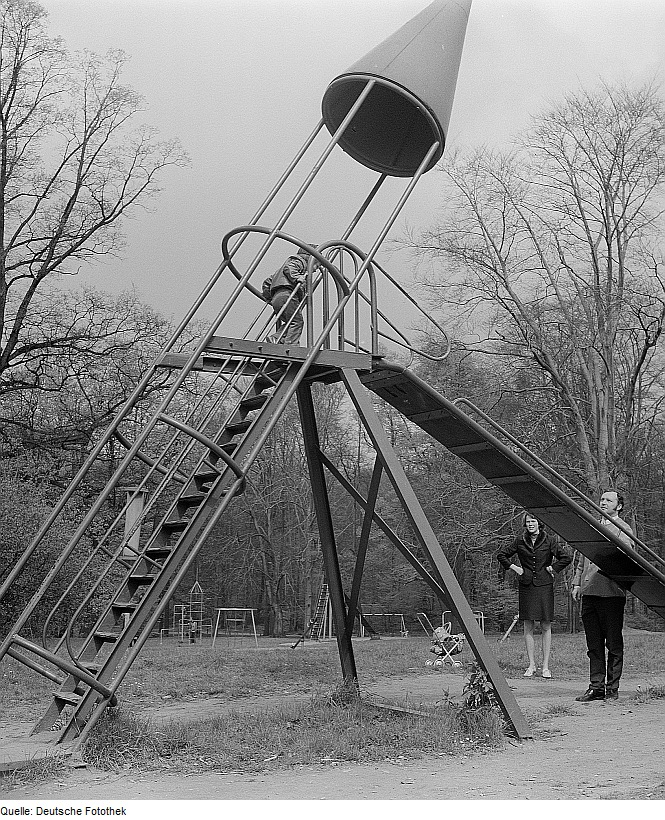
Missile slide in Dresden, East Germany. Photo by Richard Peter.

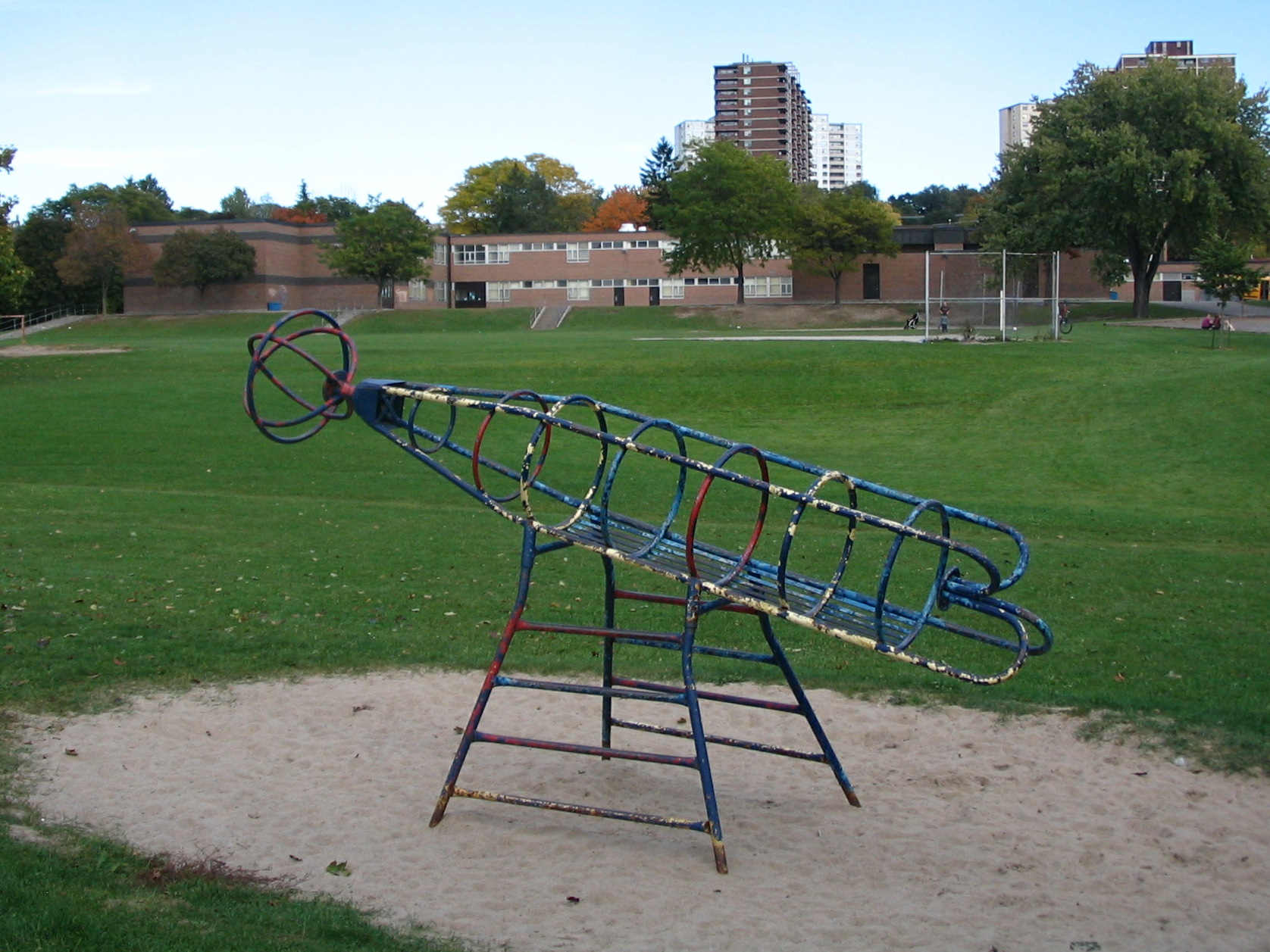
Nuclear bomb model in Toronto, Ontario, Canada

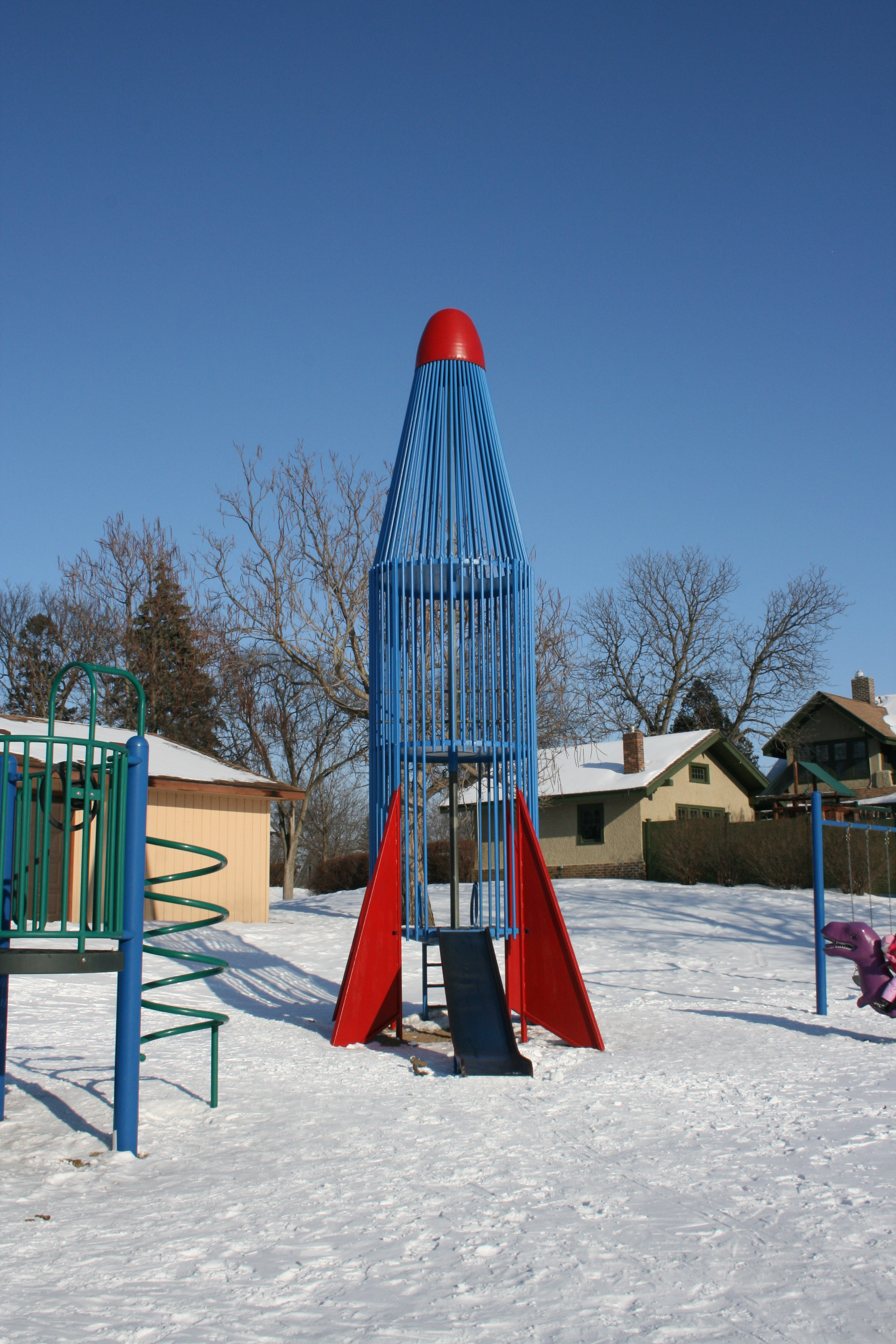
Rocket Hill Park, Hutchinson, Minnesota, United States

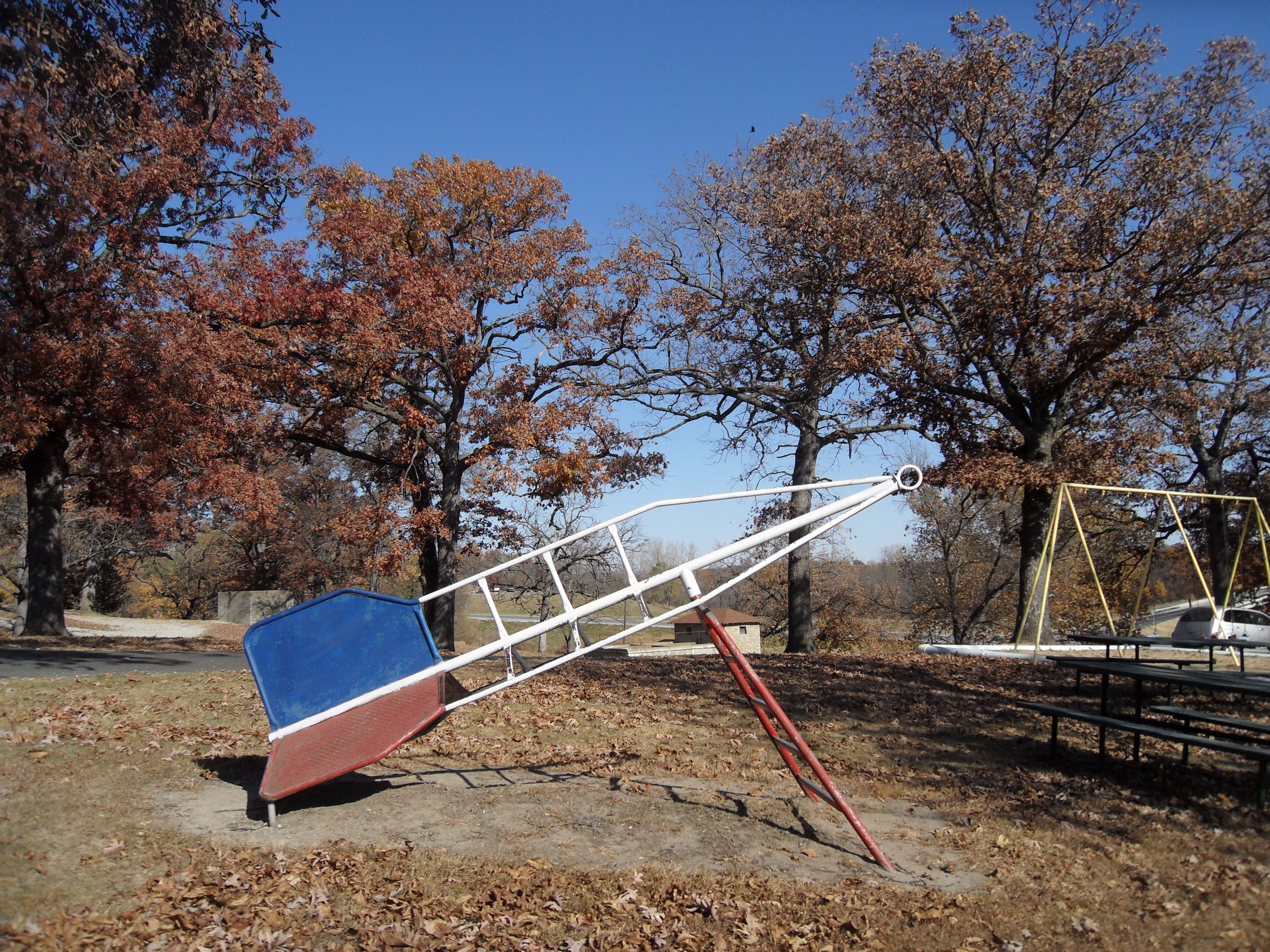
A rocket in Princeton, Missouri, United States

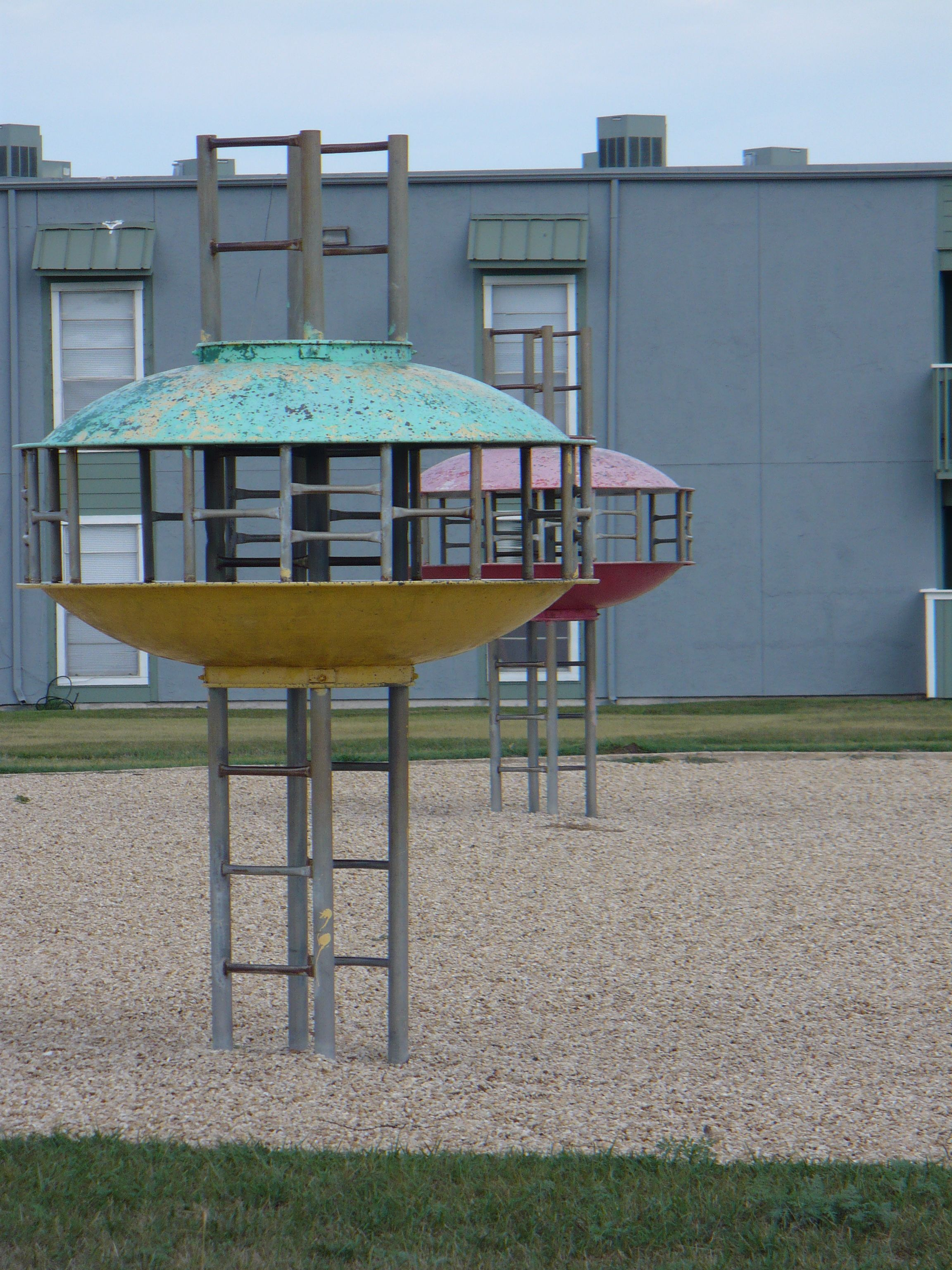
Radar defense station, United States

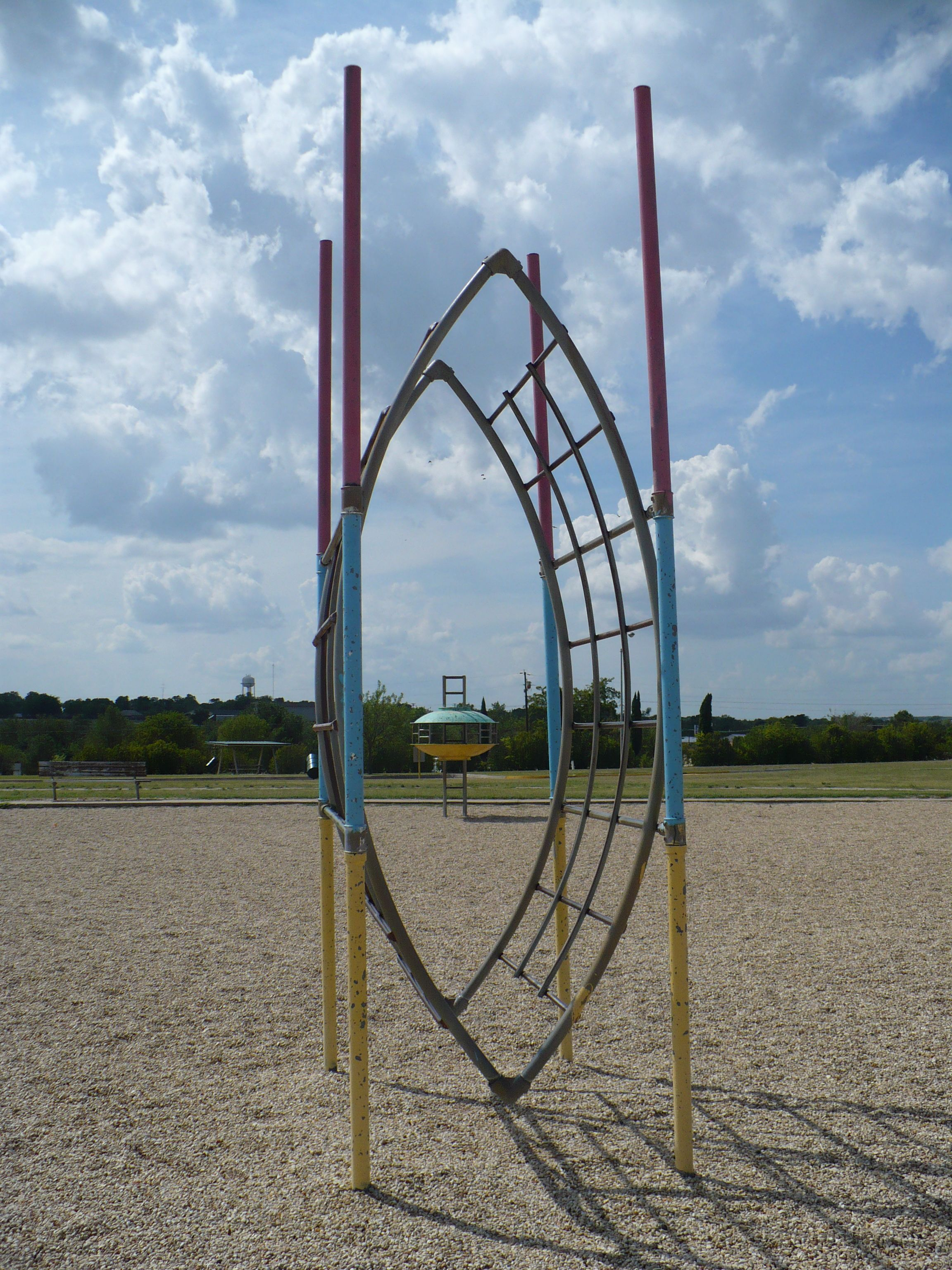
Radar climber, United States

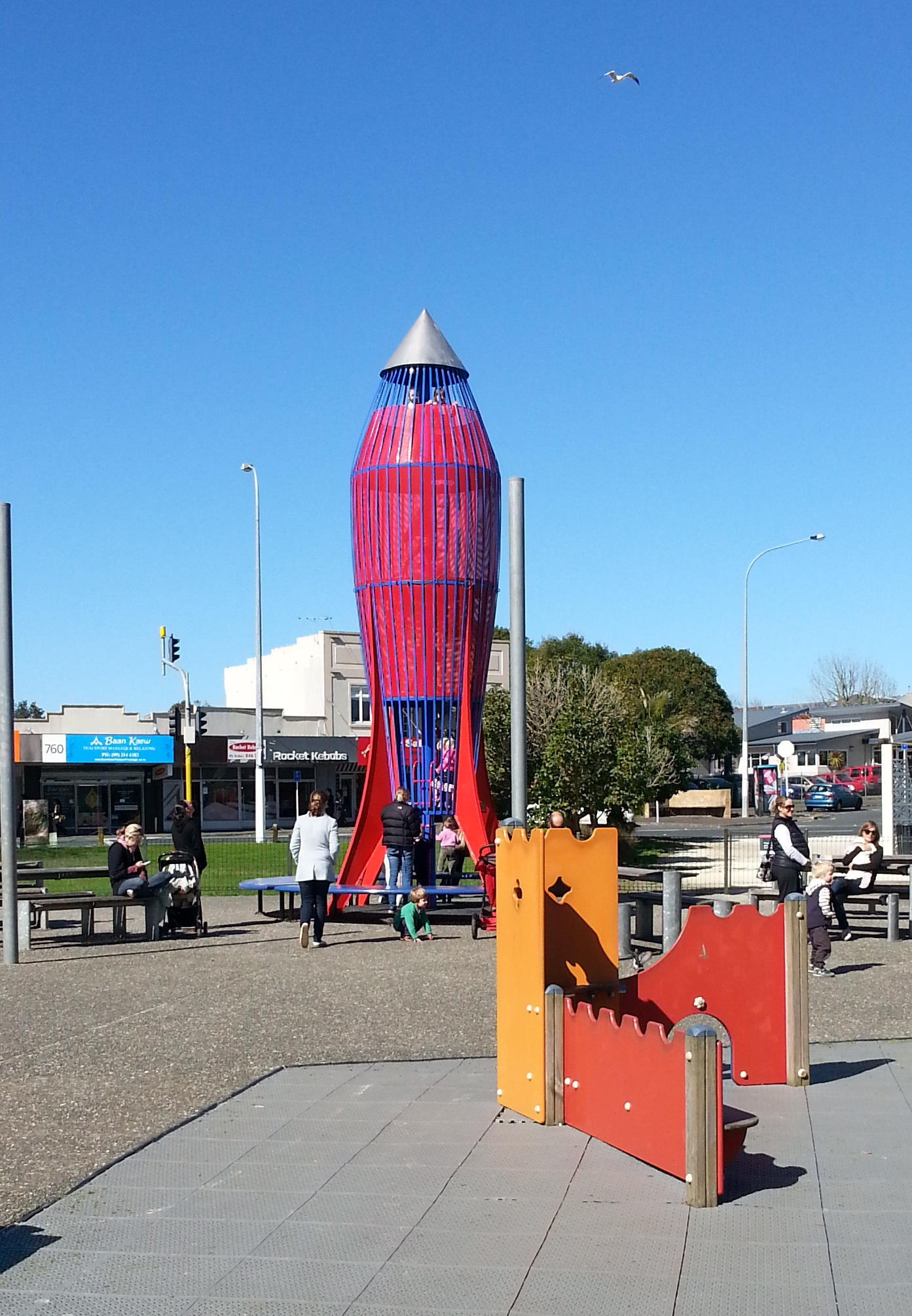
Playground rocket at Rocket Park, Mount Albert, Auckland, New Zealand
