= Carroll Alsop House =

Historic house in Iowa, United States

- U.S. National Register of Historic Places
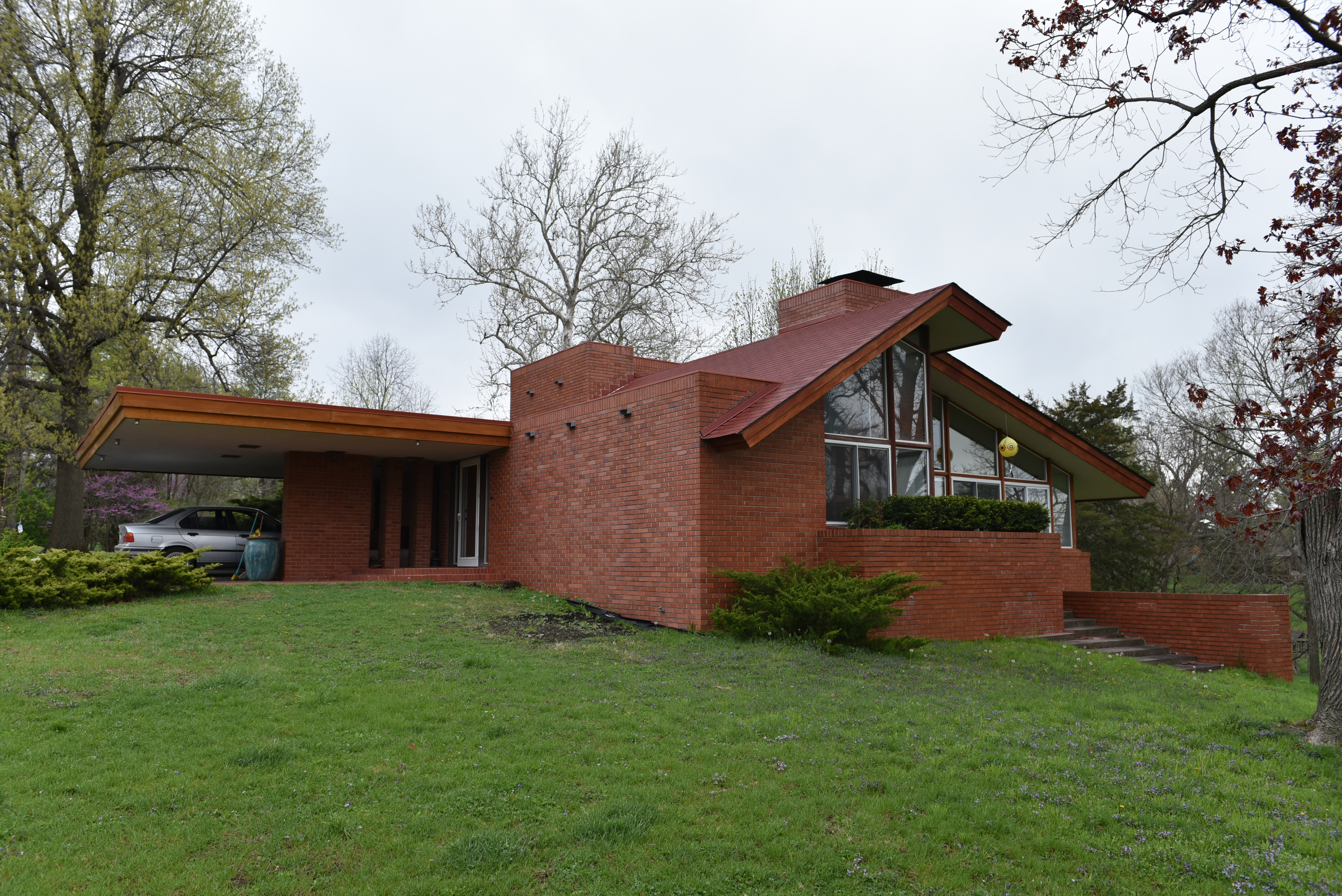

- Location within Iowa Location within the United States
- Location: 1907 A Ave., E., Oskaloosa, Iowa
- Coordinates: 41°17′48.6″N 92°37′22.6″W
- Area: 1.75 acres (0.71 ha)
- Built: 1951
- Architect: Frank Lloyd Wright
- Architectural style: Usonian
- NRHP reference No.: 88002142
- Added to NRHP: November 9, 1988

Carroll Alsop House is a historic house located at 1907 A Avenue East in Oskaloosa, Iowa.It is one of seven Frank Lloyd Wright designed Usonian houses located in Iowa, and one of two that were constructed in Oskaloosa. Both were completed in 1951. This house is an L-plan, unless you count the carport, which makes it a T-plan. It was a custom-built house that embodied the ideals of "free and simple living, in touch with nature, for the family of moderate means."

In 1947, Frank Lloyd Wright was approached by two families from Oskaloosa, Iowa, who requested his architectural services for designing their homes. Wright accepted the commission, leading to the design of the Carroll Alsop house and the adjacent Lamberson house. The project was supervised by Wright's apprentice, John deKoven Hill, with construction managed by builder Jim De Reus.

The house was listed on the National Register of Historic Places on November 9, 1988.

== See also ==
- National Register of Historic Places listings in Mahaska County, Iowa
- List of Frank Lloyd Wright works
