= 2022 United States Senate elections =

- November 8, 2022 (Note: A runoff election was held in Georgia on December 6.)
- Class 3

35 (Note: 34 Class 3 seats including both the concurring special and regular elections in California, as well as 1 Class 2 seat in special election) of the 100 seats in the United States Senate 51 (Note: Majority control in an evenly divided Senate is determined by the Vice President of the United States, who can break tied votes in their constitutional capacity as President of the Senate. Accordingly, Senate control requires 51 seats without control of the vice presidency or 50 seats with control of the vice presidency.) seats needed for a majority
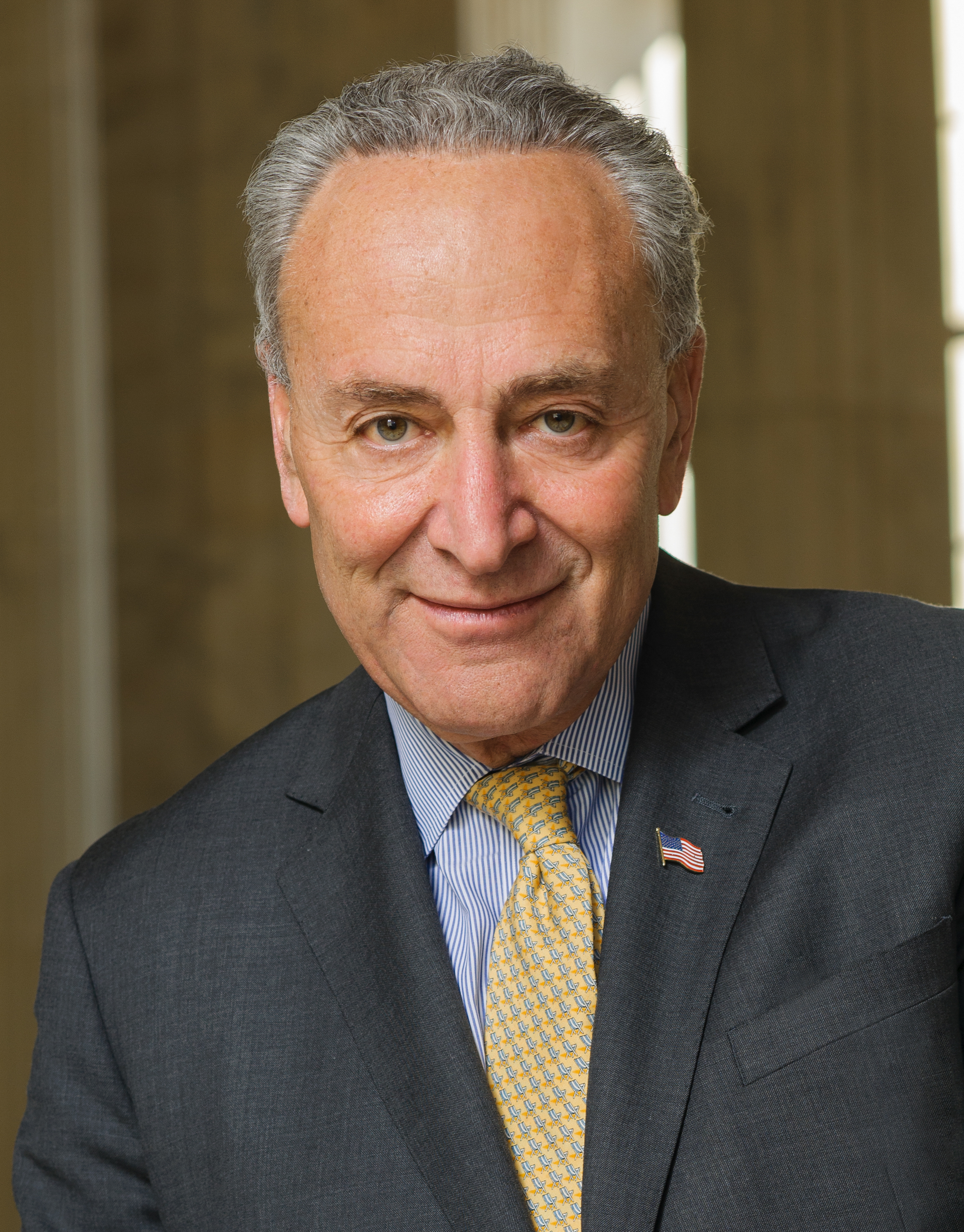

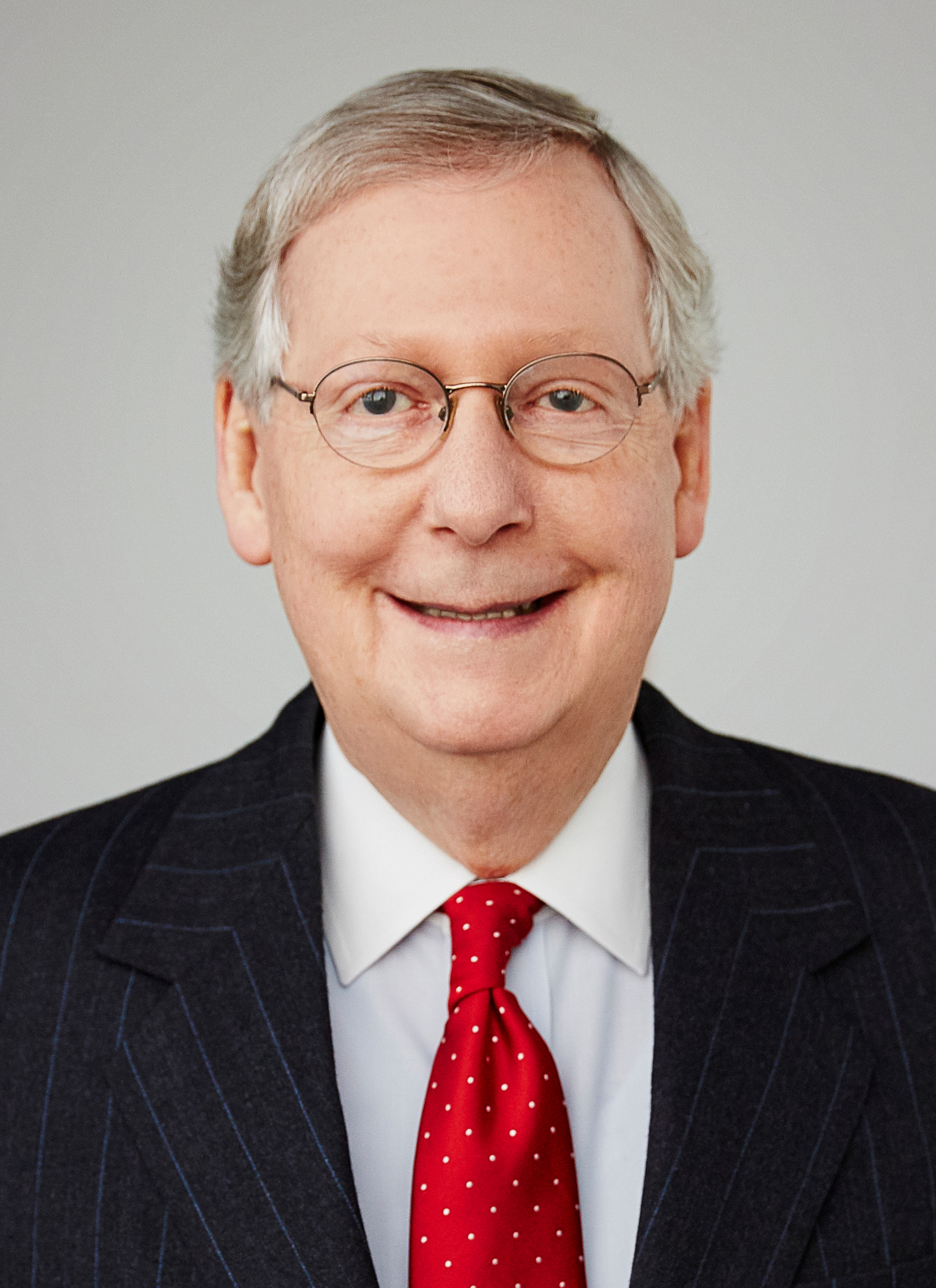
| | Majority party | Minority party |
|---|---|---|
| Leader | Chuck Schumer | Mitch McConnell |
| Party | Democratic | Republican |
| Leader since | January 3, 2017 | January 3, 2007 |
| Leader's seat | New York | Kentucky |
| Seats before | 48 + VP (Note: Both independent senators—Bernie Sanders (VT) and Angus King (ME)—caucus with the Democratic Party.) (Note: Although the 2020 elections yielded a 50–50 tie between the Democratic and Republican caucuses, Democrats took the majority due to their concurrent victory in the presidential election, with Vice President Kamala Harris empowered to act as tie-breaker.) | 50 |
| Seats after | 49 (Note: Kyrsten Sinema, whose seat was not up for election in 2022, left the Democratic Party and became an independent politician in December 2022, after the election but before the swearing in of the next Congress. As a result, 48 Democrats (rather than 49), plus King and Sanders, independents who caucus with Democrats, served in the 118th United States Congress. Sinema opted to caucus with neither party but to continue aligning with the Democrats, bringing the Democratic Senate majority to 51 seats.) | 49 |
| Seat change | ▲1 | ▼1 |
| Popular vote | 46,208,845 (Note: For the Georgia race, only the runoff results are counted.) | 43,850,241 |
| Percentage | 49.95% | 47.40% |
| Seats up | 14 | 21 |
| Races won | 15 | 20 |
| | Third party |
| Party | Independent |
| Seats before | 2 |
| Seats after | 2 |
| Seat change | Steady |
| Popular vote | 686,281 |
| Percentage | 0.74% |
| Seats up | 0 |
| Races won | 0 |
- Results of the elections: Democratic gain Democratic hold Republican hold No election Rectangular inset (Oklahoma): both seats up for election
Majority Leader before election
Chuck Schumer
Democratic
Elected Majority Leader
Chuck Schumer
Democratic

The 2022 United States Senate elections were held on November 8, 2022, concurrently with other midterm elections at the federal, state, and local levels. Regularly scheduled elections were held for 34 of the 100 seats in the U.S. Senate, the winners of which would serve six-year terms beginning with the 118th United States Congress. Two special elections were held to complete unexpired terms. While pundits considered the Republican Party a slight favorite to gain control of the Senate, the Democrats outperformed expectations and expanded the majority they had held since 2021, gaining a seat for a functioning 51–49 majority.

Senators are divided into three classes whose terms are staggered so that a different class is elected every other year. All 34 Class 3 Senate seats, last elected in 2016, were up for election in 2022. Before the elections, Class 3 consisted of 14 Democrats and 20 Republicans. Special elections were concurrently held in California, to fill Vice President Kamala Harris's unexpired Senate term ending in 2022, and in Oklahoma, to fill the remaining four years of Jim Inhofe's unexpired term. Five Republican senators and one Democratic senator retired instead of seeking re-election; 15 Republicans and 13 Democrats ran for re-election. Before the elections, Democrats had held a majority in the Senate since January 20, 2021. There were 48 Democratic and two independent senators who caucused with them; Harris's tie-breaking vote as vice president gave Democrats control of the chamber.

While Republicans appeared slightly favored in several competitive races, a red wave election did not materialize. Democrats gained a seat, in Pennsylvania where Democrat John Fetterman won the election to succeed retiring Republican Pat Toomey. All incumbents won re-election, and all other open seats besides Pennsylvania were held by the same party as the retiring senator. For the first time since the ratification of the 17th Amendment, no incumbent lost a U.S. Senate primary or general election. (Note: In the 1914 U.S. Senate elections, no incumbent senator lost a general election, but two senators, one each from Kansas and South Dakota, lost renomination in their primary elections.)

The better-than-expected performance of Democrats has been attributed to several factors, including the issue of abortion after Dobbs v. Jackson Women's Health Organization, the role of Donald Trump, and alleged extremism or election denialism among Republicans. The 2022 election cycle was the first time in U.S. history in which multiple Senate races in the same year were contested between two Black nominees (Georgia and South Carolina). (Note: Three previous elections have taken place in which both major-party nominees were Black: the 2004 U.S. Senate election in Illinois, the 2014 U.S. Senate special election in South Carolina, and the 2016 U.S. Senate election in South Carolina.)

== Partisan composition ==
All 34 Class 3 senators were up for election in 2022; before Election Day, Class 3 consisted of 14 Democrats and 20 Republicans, including a seat in California held by an interim appointee up for a special election. Additionally, a special election was held for a Class 2 seat in Oklahoma. Of the senators not up for election, 34 were Democrats, 29 were Republicans, and two were independent members who caucused with the Senate Democrats.

In recent cycles, partisanship in Senate elections has much more closely matched partisanship in presidential elections, and the number of senators representing states won recently by presidential candidates of the opposite party has dwindled. In 2018, Democrats were defending 10 seats in states that Donald Trump won in the 2016 U.S. presidential election, (Note: Democratic incumbents were reelected in Michigan, Montana, Ohio, Pennsylvania, West Virginia, and Wisconsin, while Republicans flipped Florida, Indiana, Missouri, and North Dakota.) while Republicans held only one seat in a state that Hillary Clinton won in 2016 (Nevada, which Democrats flipped). In contrast, Democrats in this cycle held no seats in states that Trump won in the 2020 U.S. presidential election, while Republicans were defending only two seats in states Joe Biden won in 2020 (Pennsylvania, which Democrats flipped, and Wisconsin, which Republicans narrowly held).

Democrats had held a majority in the Senate since January 20, 2021, following the party's twin victories in the run-offs for Georgia's regular and special 2020–2021 Senate elections, and the inauguration of Harris as vice president. While many pundits believed Republicans had a strong chance to flip control of the chamber, a red wave election did not materialize. Instead, Democrats performed better than expected in many states, including Pennsylvania, New Hampshire, and Ohio. In Colorado, where some Republican strategists hoped for a competitive race, Michael Bennet won re-election handily, and in New Hampshire, another hopeful Republican target, Maggie Hassan ran ahead of Biden's 2020 margin in the state. Democrats also beat expectations in Rust Belt states; although Tim Ryan lost in Ohio, his performance in the race had a coattail effect that boosted Democrats in competitive House districts in the state, and in Pennsylvania, where John Fetterman defeated Trump-endorsee Mehmet Oz, vulnerable House Democrats also benefitted from strong Democratic performance at the top of the ticket. Fetterman improved upon Biden's 2020 results from white voters without a college degree. In Georgia's first round, Raphael Warnock improved upon his margin from 2020–2021 and finished first, before winning by 3 percentage points in the December runoff.

Democrats' strong performance has been attributed to, among other factors, backlash to abortion-rights restrictions following the U.S. Supreme Court's June 2022 decision in Dobbs v. Jackson Women's Health Organization that overturned Roe v. Wade, negative reaction to Republican extremism and election denialism, better candidate quality among Democrats than Republicans, and youth turnout and vote splitting in key races. Some Republicans blamed Trump for the party's underwhelming showing, citing the underperformance of candidates he endorsed such as Herschel Walker in Georgia and Oz in Pennsylvania. Democrats won full terms in the Class 3 Senate seats in Arizona and Pennsylvania for the first time since the 1962 elections.

The 2022 election cycle was the first time since the 2006 Senate elections that Democrats made net gains in a midterm year. Additionally, the 2022 cycle tied with the 1990 elections for the lowest number of party flips, at only 1 seat each. This was only the third election in U.S. history (after 1914 and 1934) where the opposition party failed to flip any Senate seats. It is the most recent election cycle in which the president's party gained Senate seats and simultaneously lost House seats in a midterm, which also occurred in 1914, 1962, 1970, and 2018; it was the first midterm in which Democrats did so since 1962. It was a historically good cycle for incumbents; it was the first time ever since the ratification of the 17th Amendment, which mandated the popular election of U.S. senators, in which no incumbents were defeated for either a primary or general election. Maggie Hassan (New Hampshire), Ron Johnson (Wisconsin), Mark Kelly (Arizona), Catherine Cortez-Masto (Nevada), Lisa Murkowski (Alaska), and Raphael Warnock (Georgia) faced competitive races but were all re-elected.

== Summary results ==
=== Seats ===
| Parties | | | | Total |
| Parties | Democratic | Independent | Republican | Total |
| Last elections (2020) | 48 | 2 | 50 | 100 |
| Before these elections | 48 | 2 | 50 | 100 |
| Not up | 34 | 2 | 29 | 65 |
| Class 1 (2018→2024) | 21 | 2 | 10 | 33 |
| Class 2 (2020→2026) | 13 | 0 | 19 | 32 |
| Up | 14 (Note: Includes Alex Padilla, an interim appointee to a Class 3 seat who ran in concurrent special and general elections in California.) | 0 | 21 | 35 |
| Class 3 (2016→2022) | 14 | 0 | 20 | 34 |
| Special: Class 2 & 3 | 1 | — | 1 | 2 |
General election
| Incumbent retiring | 1 | — | 5 | 6 |
| Held by same party | 1 | — | 4 | 5 |
| Replaced by other party | ▼1 Republican replaced by ▲1 Democrat | | | 1 |
| Result | 2 | — | 4 | 6 |
| Incumbent running | 13 | — | 15 | 28 |
| Won re-election | 13 | — | 15 | 28 |
| Lost re-election | — | — | — | — |
| Result | 13 | — | 15 | 28 |
Special elections
| Incumbent resigning | — | — | 1 (Note: In Oklahoma, following Jim Inhofe's announced resignation before the expiration of his term.) | 1 |
| Appointee running | 1 | — | — | 1 |
| Individuals elected | 1 | – | 1 | 2 |
| Result | 1 | – | 1 | 2 |
| Result | 49 | 2 | 49 | 100 |

=== Votes ===
National results
| Parties | Votes | % | Seats | | | | |
| Parties | Votes | % | Total before | Up | Won | Total after | +/- |
|---|---|---|---|---|---|---|---|
| Democratic | 46,208,845 | 49.95 | 48 | 14 | 15 | 49 | 1 |
| Republican | 43,850,241 | 47.40 | 50 | 21 | 20 | 49 | 1 |
| Libertarian | 711,078 | 0.77 | 0 | 0 | 0 | 0 | |
| Independent | 686,281 | 0.74 | 2 | 0 | 0 | 2 | |
| Green | 87,964 | 0.10 | 0 | 0 | 0 | 0 | |
| Constitution | 23,108 | 0.02 | 0 | 0 | 0 | 0 | |
| Other parties | 904,848 | 0.98 | 0 | 0 | 0 | 0 | |
| Write-in | 35,037 | 0.04 | 0 | 0 | 0 | 0 | |
| Total | 92,507,402 | 100.00 | 100 | 35 | 35 | 100 | |

== Closest races ==
9 races had a margin of victory under 10%:

| State | Party of winner | Margin |
|---|---|---|
| Nevada | Democratic | 0.78% |
| Wisconsin | Republican | 1.00% |
| Georgia | Democratic | 2.80% (Note: Georgia was the "tipping-point state") |
| North Carolina | Republican | 3.23% |
| Arizona | Democratic | 4.88% |
| Pennsylvania | Democratic (flip) | 4.91% |
| Ohio | Republican | 6.12% |
| Alaska | Republican | 7.41% (Note: The top two candidates in the Alaska Senate race were Republicans. Murkowski, a moderate Republican, defeated Kelly Tshibaka, a Republican endorsed by former president Donald Trump.) |
| New Hampshire | Democratic | 9.15% |

== Change in composition ==
Each block represents one of the one hundred seats in the U.S. Senate. "D_{#}" is a Democratic senator, "I_{#}" is an independent senator, and "R_{#}" is a Republican senator. They are arranged so the parties are separated and a majority is clear by crossing the middle.

=== Before the elections ===
Each block indicates an incumbent senator's actions going into the election.

| D_{1} | D_{2} | D_{3} | D_{4} | D_{5} | D_{6} | D_{7} | D_{8} | D_{9} | D_{10} |
| D_{20} | D_{19} | D_{18} | D_{17} | D_{16} | D_{15} | D_{14} | D_{13} | D_{12} | D_{11} |
| D_{21} | D_{22} | D_{23} | D_{24} | D_{25} | D_{26} | D_{27} | D_{28} | D_{29} | D_{30} |
| D_{40} Hawaii; Ran | D_{39} Ga. Ran | D_{38} Conn. Ran | D_{37} Colo. Ran | D_{36} Calif. Ran (Note: In both the regular election and the special election.) | D_{35} Ariz. Ran | D_{34} | D_{33} | D_{32} | D_{31} |
| D_{41} Ill. Ran | D_{42} Md. Ran | D_{43} Nev. Ran | D_{44} N.H. Ran | D_{45} N.Y. Ran | D_{46} Ore. Ran | D_{47} Wash. Ran | D_{48} Vt. Retired | I_{1} | I_{2} |
| Majority (with independents and vice president) ↑ | | | | | | | | | I_{2} |
| R_{41} S.C. Ran | R_{42} S.D. Ran | R_{43} Utah; Ran | R_{44} Wisc. Ran | R_{45} Okla. (sp); Resigned | R_{46} Ala. Retired | R_{47} Mo. Retired | R_{48} N.C. Retired | R_{49} Ohio; Retired | R_{50} Pa. Retired |
| R_{40} Okla. (reg); Ran | R_{39} N.D. Ran | R_{38} La. Ran | R_{37} Ky. Ran | R_{36} Kans. Ran | R_{35} Iowa; Ran | R_{34} Ind. Ran | R_{33} Idaho; Ran | R_{32} Fla. Ran | R_{31} Ark. Ran |
| R_{21} | R_{22} | R_{23} | R_{24} | R_{25} | R_{26} | R_{27} | R_{28} | R_{29} | R_{30} Alaska; Ran |
| R_{20} | R_{19} | R_{18} | R_{17} | R_{16} | R_{15} | R_{14} | R_{13} | R_{12} | R_{11} |
| R_{1} | R_{2} | R_{3} | R_{4} | R_{5} | R_{6} | R_{7} | R_{8} | R_{9} | R_{10} |

=== After the elections ===
| D_{1} | D_{2} | D_{3} | D_{4} | D_{5} | D_{6} | D_{7} | D_{8} | D_{9} | D_{10} |
| D_{20} | D_{19} | D_{18} | D_{17} | D_{16} | D_{15} | D_{14} | D_{13} | D_{12} | D_{11} |
| D_{21} | D_{22} | D_{23} | D_{24} | D_{25} | D_{26} | D_{27} | D_{28} | D_{29} | D_{30} |
| D_{40} Hawaii; Re-elected | D_{39} Ga. Re-elected | D_{38} Conn. Re-elected | D_{37} Colo. Re-elected | D_{36} Calif. Elected (Note: Appointee elected in both special and general election.) | D_{35} Ariz. Re-elected | D_{34} | D_{33} | D_{32} | D_{31} |
| D_{41} Ill. Re-elected | D_{42} Md. Re-elected | D_{43} Nev. Re-elected | D_{44} N.H. Re-elected | D_{45} N.Y. Re-elected | D_{46} Ore. Re-elected | D_{47} Vt. Hold | D_{48} Wash. Re-elected | D_{49} Pa. Gain | I_{1} |
| Majority (with independents) ↑ | | | | | | | | | I_{1} |
| R_{41} N.C. Hold | R_{42} N.D. Re-elected | R_{43} Ohio; Hold | R_{44} Okla. (reg); Re-elected | R_{45} Okla. (sp); Hold | R_{46} S.C. Re-elected | R_{47} S.D. Re-elected | R_{48} Utah; Re-elected | R_{49} Wisc. Re-elected | I_{2} |
| R_{40} Mo. Hold | R_{39} La. Re-elected | R_{38} Ky. Re-elected | R_{37} Kans. Re-elected | R_{36} Iowa; Re-elected | R_{35} Ind. Re-elected | R_{34} Idaho; Re-elected | R_{33} Fla. Re-elected | R_{32} Ark. Re-elected | R_{31} Alaska; Re-elected |
| R_{21} | R_{22} | R_{23} | R_{24} | R_{25} | R_{26} | R_{27} | R_{28} | R_{29} | R_{30} Ala. Hold |
| R_{20} | R_{19} | R_{18} | R_{17} | R_{16} | R_{15} | R_{14} | R_{13} | R_{12} | R_{11} |
| R_{1} | R_{2} | R_{3} | R_{4} | R_{5} | R_{6} | R_{7} | R_{8} | R_{9} | R_{10} |

=== Beginning of the first session ===
| D_{1} | D_{2} | D_{3} | D_{4} | D_{5} | D_{6} | D_{7} | D_{8} | D_{9} | D_{10} |
| D_{20} | D_{19} | D_{18} | D_{17} | D_{16} | D_{15} | D_{14} | D_{13} | D_{12} | D_{11} |
| D_{21} | D_{22} | D_{23} | D_{24} | D_{25} | D_{26} | D_{27} | D_{28} | D_{29} | D_{30} |
| D_{40} | D_{39} | D_{38} | D_{37} | D_{36} | D_{35} | D_{34} | D_{33} | D_{32} | D_{31} |
| D_{41} | D_{42} | D_{43} | D_{44} | D_{45} | D_{46} | D_{47} | D_{48} | I_{1} | I_{2} |
| Majority (with independents) ↑ | | | | | | | | | I_{2} |
| R_{41} | R_{42} | R_{43} | R_{44} | R_{45} | R_{46} | R_{47} | R_{48} | R_{49} | I_{3} Ariz. (cl. 1); Changed |
| R_{40} | R_{39} | R_{38} | R_{37} | R_{36} | R_{35} | R_{34} | R_{33} | R_{32} | R_{31} |
| R_{21} | R_{22} | R_{23} | R_{24} | R_{25} | R_{26} | R_{27} | R_{28} | R_{29} | R_{30} |
| R_{20} | R_{19} | R_{18} | R_{17} | R_{16} | R_{15} | R_{14} | R_{13} | R_{12} | R_{11} |
| R_{1} | R_{2} | R_{3} | R_{4} | R_{5} | R_{6} | R_{7} | R_{8} | R_{9} | R_{10} |

Key:

| D_{#} | Democratic |
| R_{#} | Republican |
| I_{#} | Independent, caucusing with Democrats |

== Final pre-election predictions ==
Several sites and individuals publish predictions of competitive seats. These predictions look at factors such as the strength of the incumbent (if the incumbent is running for re-election) and the other candidates and the state's partisan lean (reflected in part by the state's Cook Partisan Voting Index rating). The predictions assign ratings to each seat, indicating the predicted advantage that a party had in winning that seat. Most election predictors use:

- "tossup" / "battleground": no advantage
- "tilt" (used by some predictors): minimal, smallest advantage
- "lean": slight advantage
- "likely": significant, but surmountable, advantage
- "safe" or "solid": near-certain chance of victory

| Constituency | | Incumbent | | 2022 election ratings | | | | | | | | | | |
| State | PVI | Senator | Last election (Note: The last elections for this group of senators were in 2016, except for those elected in a special election or who were appointed after the resignation or passing of a sitting senator, as noted.) | Cook Nov 7, 2022 | IE Nov 3, 2022 | Sabato Nov 7, 2022 | CBS Oct 25, 2022 | Politico Nov 3, 2022 | RCP Nov 5, 2022 | Fox Nov 1, 2022 | DDHQ Nov 5, 2022 | 538 (Note: FiveThirtyEight has three separate models for their House and Senate ratings: Lite (polling data only), Classic (polls, fundraising, and past voting patterns), and Deluxe (Classic alongside experts' ratings). This table uses the Deluxe model.) Nov 7, 2022 | Econ. Nov 7, 2022 | Result |
|---|---|---|---|---|---|---|---|---|---|---|---|---|---|---|
| Alabama | R+15 | Richard Shelby (retiring) | 64.0% R | Solid R | Solid R | Safe R | Likely R | Solid R | Safe R | Solid R | Solid R | Solid R | Safe R | Britt; 66.6% R |
| Alaska | R+8 | Lisa Murkowski | 44.4% R | Solid R | Solid R | Safe R | Likely R | Solid R | Safe R | Solid R | Solid R | Solid R | Safe R | Murkowski; 53.7% R |
| Arizona | R+2 | Mark Kelly | 51.2% D (2020 sp.) (Note: Republican John McCain won with 53.7% of the vote in 2016, but died on August 25, 2018.) | Tossup | Tilt D | Lean D | Tossup | Tossup | Tossup | Tossup | Lean D | Lean D | Lean D | Kelly; 51.4% D |
| Arkansas | R+16 | John Boozman | 59.8% R | Solid R | Solid R | Safe R | Likely R | Solid R | Safe R | Solid R | Solid R | Solid R | Safe R | Boozman; 65.7% R |
| California | D+13 | Alex Padilla | Appointed (2021) (Note: Democrat Kamala Harris won with 61.6% of the vote against another Democrat in 2016, but resigned on January 18, 2021, to become Vice President of the United States.) | Solid D | Solid D | Safe D | Likely D | Solid D | Safe D | Solid D | Solid D | Solid D | Safe D | Padilla; 61.1% D |
| Colorado | D+4 | Michael Bennet | 50.0% D | Lean D | Likely D | Likely D | Lean D | Lean D | Tossup | Lean D | Lean D | Likely D | Likely D | Bennet; 55.9% D |
| Connecticut | D+7 | Richard Blumenthal | 63.2% D | Solid D | Solid D | Safe D | Likely D | Likely D | Lean D | Likely D | Solid D | Solid D | Safe D | Blumenthal; 57.5% D |
| Florida | R+3 | Marco Rubio | 52.0% R | Likely R | Likely R | Likely R | Lean R | Lean R | Lean R | Likely R | Likely R | Solid R | Likely R | Rubio; 57.7% R |
| Georgia | R+3 | Raphael Warnock | 51.0% D (2021 sp. run-off) (Note: Republican Johnny Isakson won with 54.8% of the vote in 2016, but resigned on December 31, 2019.) | Tossup | Tossup | Lean R (flip) | Tossup | Tossup | Tossup | Tossup | Tossup | Lean R (flip) | Tossup | Warnock; 51.4% D (Note: This race was decided in a run-off on December 6, 2022, after no candidate reached 50% of the vote on November 8.) |
| Hawaii | D+14 | Brian Schatz | 73.6% D | Solid D | Solid D | Safe D | Likely D | Solid D | Safe D | Solid D | Solid D | Solid D | Safe D | Schatz; 71.2% D |
| Idaho | R+18 | Mike Crapo | 66.1% R | Solid R | Solid R | Safe R | Likely R | Solid R | Safe R | Solid R | Solid R | Solid R | Safe R | Crapo; 60.7% R |
| Illinois | D+7 | Tammy Duckworth | 54.9% D | Solid D | Solid D | Safe D | Likely D | Solid D | Likely D | Solid D | Solid D | Solid D | Safe D | Duckworth; 56.8% D |
| Indiana | R+11 | Todd Young | 52.1% R | Solid R | Solid R | Safe R | Likely R | Solid R | Safe R | Solid R | Solid R | Solid R | Safe R | Young; 58.6% R |
| Iowa | R+6 | Chuck Grassley | 60.1% R | Solid R | Likely R | Likely R | Likely R | Likely R | Likely R | Likely R | Solid R | Solid R | Safe R | Grassley; 56.0% R |
| Kansas | R+10 | Jerry Moran | 62.2% R | Solid R | Solid R | Safe R | Likely R | Solid R | Safe R | Solid R | Solid R | Solid R | Safe R | Moran; 60.0% R |
| Kentucky | R+16 | Rand Paul | 57.3% R | Solid R | Solid R | Safe R | Likely R | Solid R | Safe R | Solid R | Solid R | Solid R | Safe R | Paul; 61.8% R |
| Louisiana | R+12 | John Kennedy | 60.7% R | Solid R | Solid R | Safe R | Likely R | Solid R | Safe R | Solid R | Solid R | Solid R | Safe R | Kennedy; 61.6% R |
| Maryland | D+14 | Chris Van Hollen | 60.9% D | Solid D | Solid D | Safe D | Likely D | Solid D | Safe D | Solid D | Solid D | Solid D | Safe D | Van Hollen; 65.8% D |
| Missouri | R+10 | Roy Blunt (retiring) | 49.2% R | Solid R | Solid R | Safe R | Likely R | Likely R | Likely R | Solid R | Solid R | Solid R | Safe R | Schmitt; 55.4% R |
| Nevada | R+1 | Catherine Cortez Masto | 47.1% D | Tossup | Tossup | Lean D | Tossup | Tossup | Tossup | Tossup | Tossup | Tossup | Lean R (flip) | Cortez Masto; 48.8% D |
| New Hampshire | D+1 | Maggie Hassan | 48.0% D | Lean D | Tilt D | Lean D | Lean D | Tossup | Tossup | Lean D | Lean D | Lean D | Lean D | Hassan; 53.5% D |
| New York | D+10 | Chuck Schumer | 70.6% D | Solid D | Solid D | Safe D | Likely D | Solid D | Likely D | Solid D | Solid D | Solid D | Safe D | Schumer; 56.8% D |
| North Carolina | R+3 | Richard Burr (retiring) | 51.1% R | Lean R | Tilt R | Lean R | Lean R | Lean R | Lean R | Lean R | Lean R | Likely R | Lean R | Budd; 50.5% R |
| North Dakota | R+20 | John Hoeven | 78.5% R | Solid R | Solid R | Safe R | Likely R | Solid R | Safe R | Solid R | Solid R | Solid R | Safe R | Hoeven; 56.4% R |
| Ohio | R+6 | Rob Portman (retiring) | 58.0% R | Lean R | Lean R | Lean R | Lean R | Lean R | Lean R | Lean R | Likely R | Likely R | Lean R | Vance; 53.0% R |
| Oklahoma (regular) | R+20 | James Lankford | 67.7% R | Solid R | Solid R | Safe R | Likely R | Solid R | Safe R | Solid R | Solid R | Solid R | Safe R | Lankford; 64.3% R |
| Oklahoma (special) | R+20 | Jim Inhofe (resigning) | 62.9% R (2020) | Solid R | Solid R | Safe R | Likely R | Solid R | Safe R | Solid R | Solid R | Solid R | Safe R | Mullin; 61.8% R |
| Oregon | D+6 | Ron Wyden | 56.6% D | Solid D | Solid D | Safe D | Likely D | Solid D | Safe D | Solid D | Solid D | Solid D | Safe D | Wyden; 55.8% D |
| Pennsylvania | R+2 | Pat Toomey (retiring) | 48.8% R | Tossup | Tossup | Lean R | Tossup | Tossup | Tossup | Tossup | Tossup | Tossup | Tossup | Fetterman; 51.2% D (flip) |
| South Carolina | R+8 | Tim Scott | 60.6% R | Solid R | Solid R | Safe R | Likely R | Solid R | Safe R | Solid R | Solid R | Solid R | Safe R | Scott; 62.9% R |
| South Dakota | R+16 | John Thune | 71.8% R | Solid R | Solid R | Safe R | Likely R | Solid R | Safe R | Solid R | Solid R | Solid R | Safe R | Thune; 69.6% R |
| Utah | R+13 | Mike Lee | 68.2% R | Likely R | Likely R | Likely R | Likely R | Likely R | Likely R | Likely R | Solid R | Solid R | Safe R | Lee; 53.2% R |
| Vermont | D+16 | Patrick Leahy (retiring) | 61.3% D | Solid D | Solid D | Safe D | Likely D | Solid D | Safe D | Solid D | Solid D | Solid D | Safe D | Welch; 67.3% D |
| Washington | D+8 | Patty Murray | 59.0% D | Likely D | Likely D | Likely D | Likely D | Lean D | Tossup | Likely D | Likely D | Likely D | Likely D | Murray; 57.1% D |
| Wisconsin | R+2 | Ron Johnson | 50.2% R | Lean R | Tilt R | Lean R | Tossup | Tossup | Tossup | Lean R | Likely R | Likely R | Likely R | Johnson; 50.4% R |
| Overall (Note: Democratic total includes two independents who caucus with Democratic Party.) | | | | D – 47; R – 49; 4 tossups | D – 48; R – 49; 3 tossups | D – 49; R – 51; 0 tossups | D – 47; R – 48; 5 tossups | D – 47; R – 48; 5 tossups | D – 44; R – 48; 8 tossups | D – 47; R – 49; 4 tossups | D – 48; R – 49; 3 tossups | D – 48; R – 50; 2 tossups | D – 48; R – 50; 2 tossups | Results: D – 51; R – 49 |

== Gains and holds ==
One Democrat and five Republicans retired instead of seeking re-election.

=== Retirements ===
Map of retirements: Republican incumbent Democratic incumbent Republican retiring Democratic retiring

| State | Senator | Age at end of term | Assumed office | Replaced by | Ref |
|---|---|---|---|---|---|
| Alabama | Richard Shelby | 88 | 1987 | Katie Britt | |
| Missouri | Roy Blunt | 72 | 2011 | Eric Schmitt | |
| North Carolina | Richard Burr | 67 | 2005 | Ted Budd | |
| Ohio | Rob Portman | 67 | 2011 | JD Vance | |
| Pennsylvania | Pat Toomey | 61 | 2011 | John Fetterman | |
| Vermont | Patrick Leahy | 82 | 1975 | Peter Welch | |

=== Resignations ===
One Republican resigned two years into his six-year term.

| State | Senator | Age of resignation | Assumed office | Replaced by | Ref |
|---|---|---|---|---|---|
| Oklahoma (special) | Jim Inhofe | 88 | 1994 (Note: Elected in the special election to finish David Boren's term.) | Markwayne Mullin | |

=== Post-election changes ===
One Democrat died during the 118th Congress and was replaced by a Democratic appointee. One Republican resigned shortly after the start of the 118th Congress and was replaced by a Republican appointee. One Democrat resigned during the 118th Congress and was replaced by a Democratic appointee. In Nebraska, a 2024 special election was held prior to the 2026 Senate elections for the remainder of the Class 2 term, where Republican appointee Pete Ricketts won the special election to finish the term. In California and New Jersey, regular scheduled elections were held in the 2024 Senate elections for the Class 1 terms, where Democrat Adam Schiff won the California election to succeed Democratic appointee Laphonza Butler, who did not seek election; and in New Jersey, where Andy Kim won to succeed Democratic appointee George Helmy, who did not seek election.

| State | Senator | Replaced by |
|---|---|---|
| Nebraska (Class 2) | Ben Sasse | Pete Ricketts |
| California (Class 1) | Dianne Feinstein | Laphonza Butler |
| New Jersey (Class 1) | Bob Menendez | George Helmy |
| California (Class 1) | Laphonza Butler | Adam Schiff |
| New Jersey (Class 1) | George Helmy | Andy Kim |

== Race summary ==
=== Special elections during the preceding Congress ===
In each special election, the winner's term can begin immediately after their election is certified by their state's government. In cases where a resignation has been previously announced, the new senator's term can begin once the previous senator's resignation is submitted officially.

Elections are sorted by date, then state.

| State | Incumbent | | | Result | Candidates |
| State | Senator | Party | Electoral history | Result | Candidates |
|---|---|---|---|---|---|
| California (Class 3) | Alex Padilla | Democratic | 2021 (appointed) | Interim appointee elected. Winner also elected to the next term; see below. | ▌ ✓ Alex Padilla (Democratic) 60.9%; ▌Mark Meuser (Republican) 39.1% |
| Oklahoma (Class 2) | Jim Inhofe | Republican | 1994 (special); 1996; 2002; 2008; 2014; 2020 | Incumbent resigned January 3, 2023. Republican hold. | ▌ ✓ Markwayne Mullin (Republican) 61.8%; ▌Kendra Horn (Democratic) 35.2%; ▌Robert Murphy (Libertarian) 1.5%; ▌Ray Woods (Independent) 1.5% |

=== Elections leading to the next Congress ===
In these general elections, the winners will be elected for the term beginning January 3, 2023.

| State | Incumbent | | | Result | Major candidates (Note: Major candidates include those who have previously held office and/or those who are the subject of media attention.) |
| State | Senator | Party | Electoral history | Result | Major candidates |
|---|---|---|---|---|---|
| Alabama | Richard Shelby | Republican | 1986 (Note: Senator Richard Shelby was originally elected as a Democrat in 1986 and 1992 before switching to a Republican in 1994. Shelby won re-election as a Republican in 1998, 2004, 2010 and 2016.); 1992; 1998; 2004; 2010; 2016 | Incumbent retired. Republican hold. | ▌ ✓ Katie Britt (Republican) 66.6%; ▌Will Boyd (Democratic) 30.9%; ▌John Sophocleus (Libertarian) 2.3% |
| Alaska | Lisa Murkowski | Republican | 2002 (appointed); 2004; 2010 (write-in); 2016 | Incumbent re-elected in instant runoff. | First round: ▌ Lisa Murkowski (Republican) 43.4%; ▌ Kelly Tshibaka (Republican) 42.6%; ▌Patricia Chesbro (Democratic) 10.4%; ▌Buzz Kelley (Republican) 2.9%; Instant runoff: ▌ ✓ Lisa Murkowski (Republican) 53.7%; ▌Kelly Tshibaka (Republican) 46.3% |
| Arizona | Mark Kelly | Democratic | 2020 (special) | Incumbent re-elected. | ▌ ✓ Mark Kelly (Democratic) 51.4%; ▌Blake Masters (Republican) 46.5%; ▌Marc Victor (Libertarian) 2.1% |
| Arkansas | John Boozman | Republican | 2010; 2016 | Incumbent re-elected. | ▌ ✓ John Boozman (Republican) 65.8%; ▌Natalie James (Democratic) 31.0%; ▌Kenneth Cates (Libertarian) 3.2% |
| California | Alex Padilla | Democratic | 2021 (appointed) | Interim appointee elected. Winner also elected to finish the term; see above. | ▌ ✓ Alex Padilla (Democratic) 61.1%; ▌Mark Meuser (Republican) 38.9% |
| Colorado | Michael Bennet | Democratic | 2009 (appointed); 2010; 2016 | Incumbent re-elected. | ▌ ✓ Michael Bennet (Democratic) 55.9%; ▌Joe O'Dea (Republican) 41.3%; Others: ▌Brian Peotter (Libertarian) 1.7%; ▌T. J. Cole (Unity) 0.7%; ▌Frank Atwood (Approval Voting) 0.5% |
| Connecticut | Richard Blumenthal | Democratic | 2010; 2016 | Incumbent re-elected. | ▌ ✓ Richard Blumenthal (Democratic) 57.5%; ▌Leora Levy (Republican) 42.5% |
| Florida | Marco Rubio | Republican | 2010; 2016 | Incumbent re-elected. | ▌ ✓ Marco Rubio (Republican) 57.7%; ▌Val Demings (Democratic) 41.3%; Others: ▌Dennis Misigoy (Libertarian) 0.4%; ▌Steven B. Grant (Independent) 0.4%; ▌Tuan Nguyen (Independent) 0.2% |
| Georgia | Raphael Warnock | Democratic | 2021 (special) | Incumbent re-elected in runoff. | First round: ▌ Raphael Warnock (Democratic) 49.4%; ▌ Herschel Walker (Republican) 48.5%; ▌Chase Oliver (Libertarian) 2.1%; Runoff: ▌ ✓ Raphael Warnock (Democratic) 51.4%; ▌Herschel Walker (Republican) 48.6% |
| Hawaii | Brian Schatz | Democratic | 2012 (appointed); 2014 (special); 2016 | Incumbent re-elected. | ▌ ✓ Brian Schatz (Democratic) 71.2%; ▌Bob McDermott (Republican) 26.0%; Others: ▌Feena Bonoan (Libertarian) 1.2%; ▌Emma Pohlman (Green) 1.0%; ▌Dan Decker (Aloha ʻĀina) 0.5% |
| Idaho | Mike Crapo | Republican | 1998; 2004; 2010; 2016 | Incumbent re-elected. | ▌ ✓ Mike Crapo (Republican) 60.7%; ▌David Roth (Democratic) 28.7%; ▌Scott Cleveland (Independent) 8.5%; ▌Ray Writz (Constitution) 1.4%; ▌Idaho Sierra Law (Libertarian) 0.7% |
| Illinois | Tammy Duckworth | Democratic | 2016 | Incumbent re-elected. | ▌ ✓ Tammy Duckworth (Democratic) 56.8%; ▌Kathy Salvi (Republican) 41.5%; ▌Bill Redpath (Libertarian) 1.7% |
| Indiana | Todd Young | Republican | 2016 | Incumbent re-elected. | ▌ ✓ Todd Young (Republican) 58.6%; ▌Thomas McDermott Jr. (Democratic) 37.9%; ▌James Sceniak (Libertarian) 3.4% |
| Iowa | Chuck Grassley | Republican | 1980; 1986; 1992; 1998; 2004; 2010; 2016 | Incumbent re-elected. | ▌ ✓ Chuck Grassley (Republican) 56.0%; ▌Michael Franken (Democratic) 43.8% |
| Kansas | Jerry Moran | Republican | 2010; 2016 | Incumbent re-elected. | ▌ ✓ Jerry Moran (Republican) 60.0%; ▌Mark Holland (Democratic) 37.0%; ▌David Graham (Libertarian) 3.0% |
| Kentucky | Rand Paul | Republican | 2010; 2016 | Incumbent re-elected. | ▌ ✓ Rand Paul (Republican) 61.8%; ▌Charles Booker (Democratic) 38.2% |
| Louisiana | John Kennedy | Republican | 2016 | Incumbent re-elected. | ▌ ✓ John Kennedy (Republican) 61.6%; ▌Gary Chambers (Democratic) 17.9%; ▌Luke Mixon (Democratic) 13.2%; Others: ▌Syrita Steib (Democratic) 2.3%; ▌Devin Graham (Republican) 1.8%; ▌Vinny Mendoza (Democratic) 0.9%; ▌Beryl Billiot (Independent) 0.7%; ▌Salvador Rodriguez (Democratic) 0.6%; ▌Bradley McMorris (Independent) 0.4%; ▌Aaron Sigler (Libertarian) 0.4%; ▌Xan John (Independent) 0.2%; ▌Thomas La Fontaine Olson (Independent) 0.1%; ▌Thomas Wenn (Independent) 0.1% |
| Maryland | Chris Van Hollen | Democratic | 2016 | Incumbent re-elected. | ▌ ✓ Chris Van Hollen (Democratic) 65.8%; ▌Chris Chaffee (Republican) 34.2% |
| Missouri | Roy Blunt | Republican | 2010; 2016 | Incumbent retired. Republican hold. | ▌ ✓ Eric Schmitt (Republican) 55.4%; ▌Trudy Busch Valentine (Democratic) 42.2%; ▌Jonathan Dine (Libertarian) 1.7%; ▌Paul Venable (Constitution) 0.7% |
| Nevada | Catherine Cortez Masto | Democratic | 2016 | Incumbent re-elected. | ▌ ✓ Catherine Cortez Masto (Democratic) 48.8%; ▌Adam Laxalt (Republican) 48.0%; Others: ▌None of These Candidates 1.2%; ▌Barry Linderman (Independent) 0.8%; ▌Neil Scott (Libertarian) 0.6%; ▌Barry Rubinson (Independent American) 0.5% |
| New Hampshire | Maggie Hassan | Democratic | 2016 | Incumbent re-elected. | ▌ ✓ Maggie Hassan (Democratic) 53.6%; ▌Don Bolduc (Republican) 44.4%; ▌Jeremy Kauffman (Libertarian) 2.0% |
| New York | Chuck Schumer | Democratic | 1998; 2004; 2010; 2016 | Incumbent re-elected. | ▌ ✓ Chuck Schumer (Democratic) 56.8%; ▌Joe Pinion (Republican) 42.8%; ▌Diane Sare (LaRouche) 0.5% |
| North Carolina | Richard Burr | Republican | 2004; 2010; 2016 | Incumbent retired. Republican hold. | ▌ ✓ Ted Budd (Republican) 50.5%; ▌Cheri Beasley (Democratic) 47.3%; ▌Shannon Bray (Libertarian) 1.4%; ▌Matthew Hoh (Green) 0.8% |
| North Dakota | John Hoeven | Republican | 2010; 2016 | Incumbent re-elected. | ▌ ✓ John Hoeven (Republican) 56.4%; ▌Katrina Christiansen (Democratic–NPL) 25.0%; ▌Rick Becker (Independent) 18.5% |
| Ohio | Rob Portman | Republican | 2010; 2016 | Incumbent retired. Republican hold. | ▌ ✓ JD Vance (Republican) 53.0%; ▌Tim Ryan (Democratic) 46.9% |
| Oklahoma | James Lankford | Republican | 2014 (special); 2016 | Incumbent re-elected. | ▌ ✓ James Lankford (Republican) 64.3%; ▌Madison Horn (Democratic) 32.1%; ▌Michael Delaney (Independent) 1.8%; ▌Kenneth Blevins (Libertarian) 1.8% |
| Oregon | Ron Wyden | Democratic | 1996 (special); 1998; 2004; 2010; 2016 | Incumbent re-elected. | ▌ ✓ Ron Wyden (Democratic) 55.9%; ▌Jo Rae Perkins (Republican) 41.0%; ▌Chris Henry (Progressive) 1.9%; ▌Dan Pulju (Pacific Green) 1.2% |
| Pennsylvania | Pat Toomey | Republican | 2010; 2016 | Incumbent retired. Democratic gain. | ▌ ✓ John Fetterman (Democratic) 51.2%; ▌Mehmet Oz (Republican) 46.3%; Others: ▌Erik Gerhardt (Libertarian) 1.4%; ▌Richard Weiss (Green) 0.6%; ▌Daniel Wassmer (Keystone) 0.5% |
| South Carolina | Tim Scott | Republican | 2013 (appointed); 2014 (special); 2016 | Incumbent re-elected. | ▌ ✓ Tim Scott (Republican) 62.9%; ▌Krystle Matthews (Democratic) 37.0% |
| South Dakota | John Thune | Republican | 2004; 2010; 2016 | Incumbent re-elected. | ▌ ✓ John Thune (Republican) 69.6%; ▌Brian Bengs (Democratic) 26.2%; ▌Tamara Lesnar (Libertarian) 4.2% |
| Utah | Mike Lee | Republican | 2010; 2016 | Incumbent re-elected. | ▌ ✓ Mike Lee (Republican) 53.1%; ▌Evan McMullin (Independent) 42.8%; ▌James Hansen (Libertarian) 2.9%; ▌Tommy Williams (Independent American) 1.1% |
| Vermont | Patrick Leahy | Democratic | 1974; 1980; 1986; 1992; 1998; 2004; 2010; 2016 | Incumbent retired. Democratic hold. | ▌ ✓ Peter Welch (Democratic) 68.5%; ▌Gerald Malloy (Republican) 28.1%; Others: ▌Dawn Ellis (Independent) 1.0%; ▌Natasha Diamondstone-Kohout (GMPJP) 0.5%; ▌Kerry Raheb (Independent) 0.5%; ▌Mark Coester (Independent) 0.4%; ▌Stephen Duke (Independent) 0.4%; ▌Cris Ericson (Independent) 0.4% |
| Washington | Patty Murray | Democratic | 1992; 1998; 2004; 2010; 2016 | Incumbent re-elected. | ▌ ✓ Patty Murray (Democratic) 57.1%; ▌Tiffany Smiley (Republican) 42.6% |
| Wisconsin | Ron Johnson | Republican | 2010; 2016 | Incumbent re-elected. | ▌ ✓ Ron Johnson (Republican) 50.4%; ▌Mandela Barnes (Democratic) 49.4% |

== Alabama ==
Alabama election
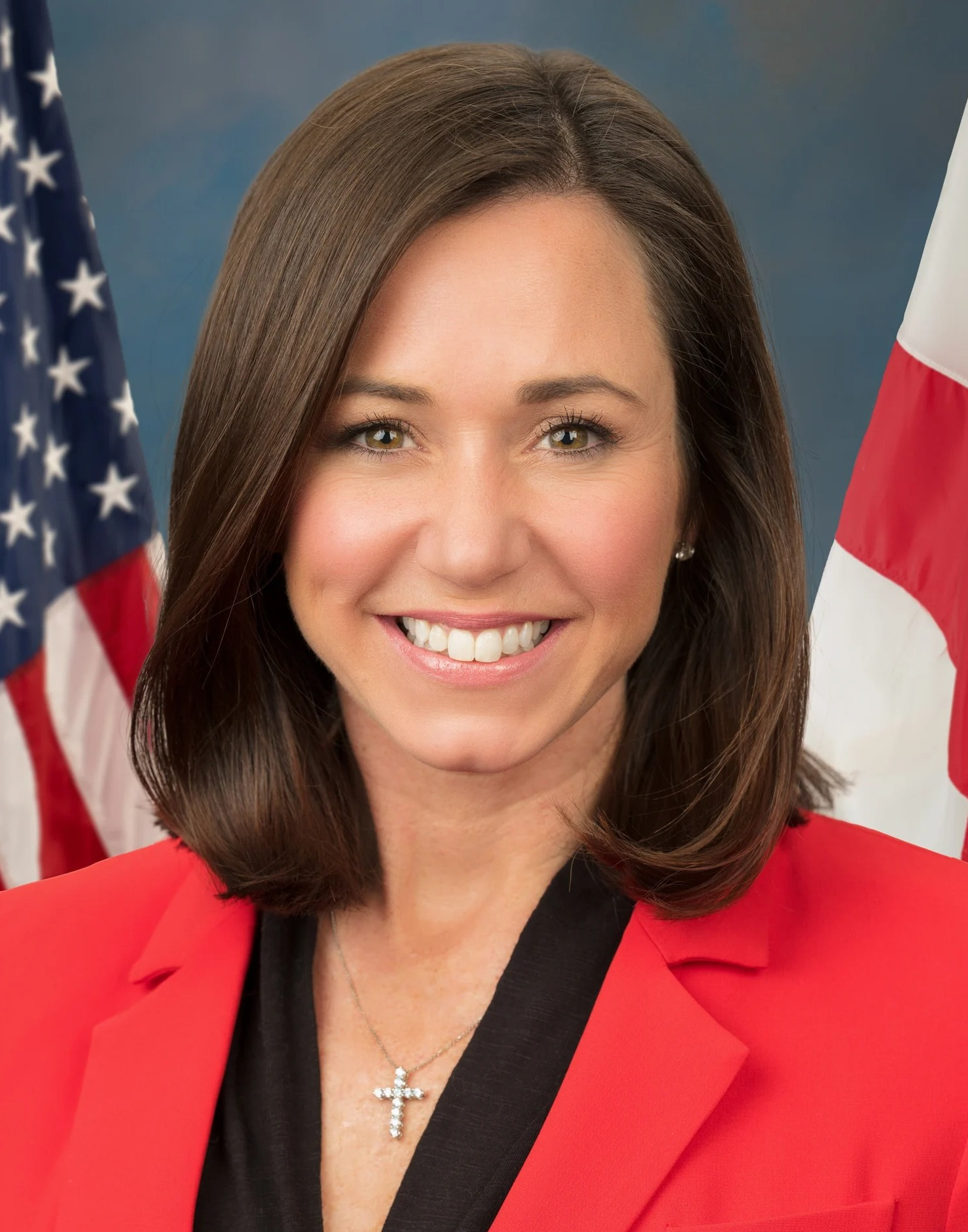

| Nominee | Katie Britt | Will Boyd |
| Party | Republican | Democratic |
| Popular vote | 942,154 | 436,746 |
| Percentage | 66.6% | 30.9% |
- County results Britt: 50–60% 60–70% 70–80% 80–90% >90% Boyd: 50–60% 60–70% 70–80%
U.S. senator before election
Richard Shelby
Republican
Elected U.S. senator
Katie Britt
Republican

Six-term Republican Richard Shelby was re-elected in 2016 with 64% of the vote. On February 8, 2021, Shelby announced that he would not seek re-election to a seventh term. Katie Britt, Shelby's former chief of staff, and Mo Brooks, a six-term U.S. representative, finished ahead of businesswoman Karla DuPriest, former Army pilot and author Michael Durant, and author Jake Schafer in the first round of the Republican primary election, with Britt going on to defeat Brooks in a runoff. Perennial candidate Will Boyd defeated former Brighton mayor Brandaun Dean and Lanny Jackson in the Democratic primary. Britt won the Senate election, becoming the first woman elected to the United States Senate from Alabama.

Alabama Republican primary
| Party | Candidate | Votes | % |
|---|---|---|---|
| Republican | Katie Britt | 289,425 | 44.75 |
| Republican | Mo Brooks | 188,539 | 29.15 |
| Republican | Michael Durant | 150,817 | 23.32 |
| Republican | Jake Schafer | 7,371 | 1.14 |
| Republican | Karla DuPriest | 5,739 | 0.89 |
| Republican | Lillie Boddie | 4,849 | 0.75 |
| Total votes | | 646,740 | 100.00 |

Alabama Republican primary runoff
| Party | Candidate | Votes | % |
|---|---|---|---|
| Republican | Katie Britt | 253,251 | 63.02 |
| Republican | Mo Brooks | 148,636 | 36.98 |
| Total votes | | 401,887 | 100.00 |

Alabama Democratic primary
| Party | Candidate | Votes | % |
|---|---|---|---|
| Democratic | Will Boyd | 107,588 | 63.72 |
| Democratic | Brandaun Dean | 32,863 | 19.46 |
| Democratic | Lanny Jackson | 28,402 | 16.82 |
| Total votes | | 168,853 | 100.00 |

Alabama general election
| Party | Candidate | Votes | % | ±% |
|---|---|---|---|---|
| Republican | Katie Britt | 942,154 | 66.62% | +2.66 |
| Democratic | Will Boyd | 436,746 | 30.88% | −4.99 |
| Libertarian | John Sophocleus | 32,879 | 2.32% | N/A |
| Write-in | | 2,459 | 0.17% | ±0.00 |
| Total votes | | 1,414,238 | 100.0% | |
| Republican hold | | | | |

== Alaska ==
Alaska election
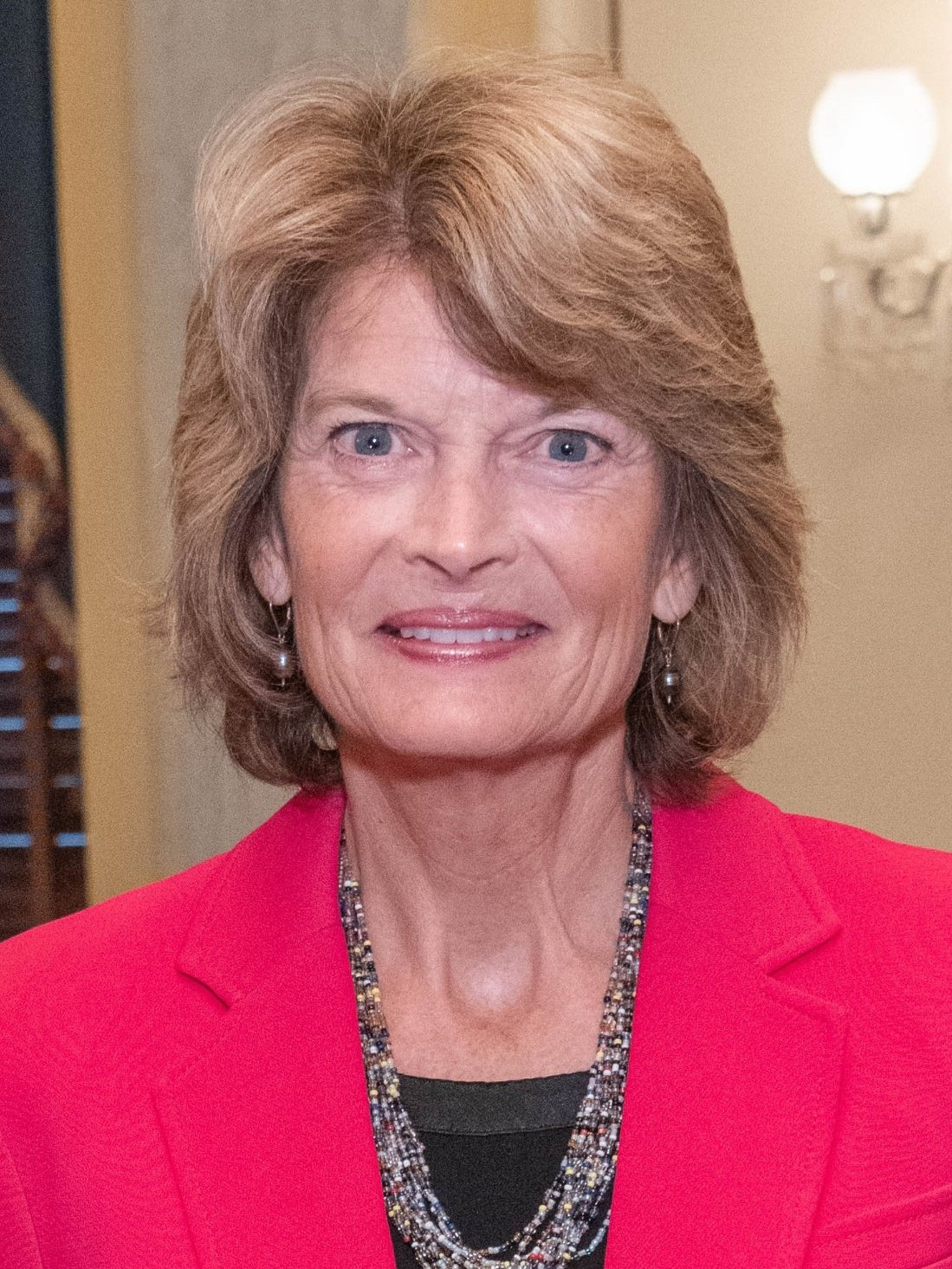

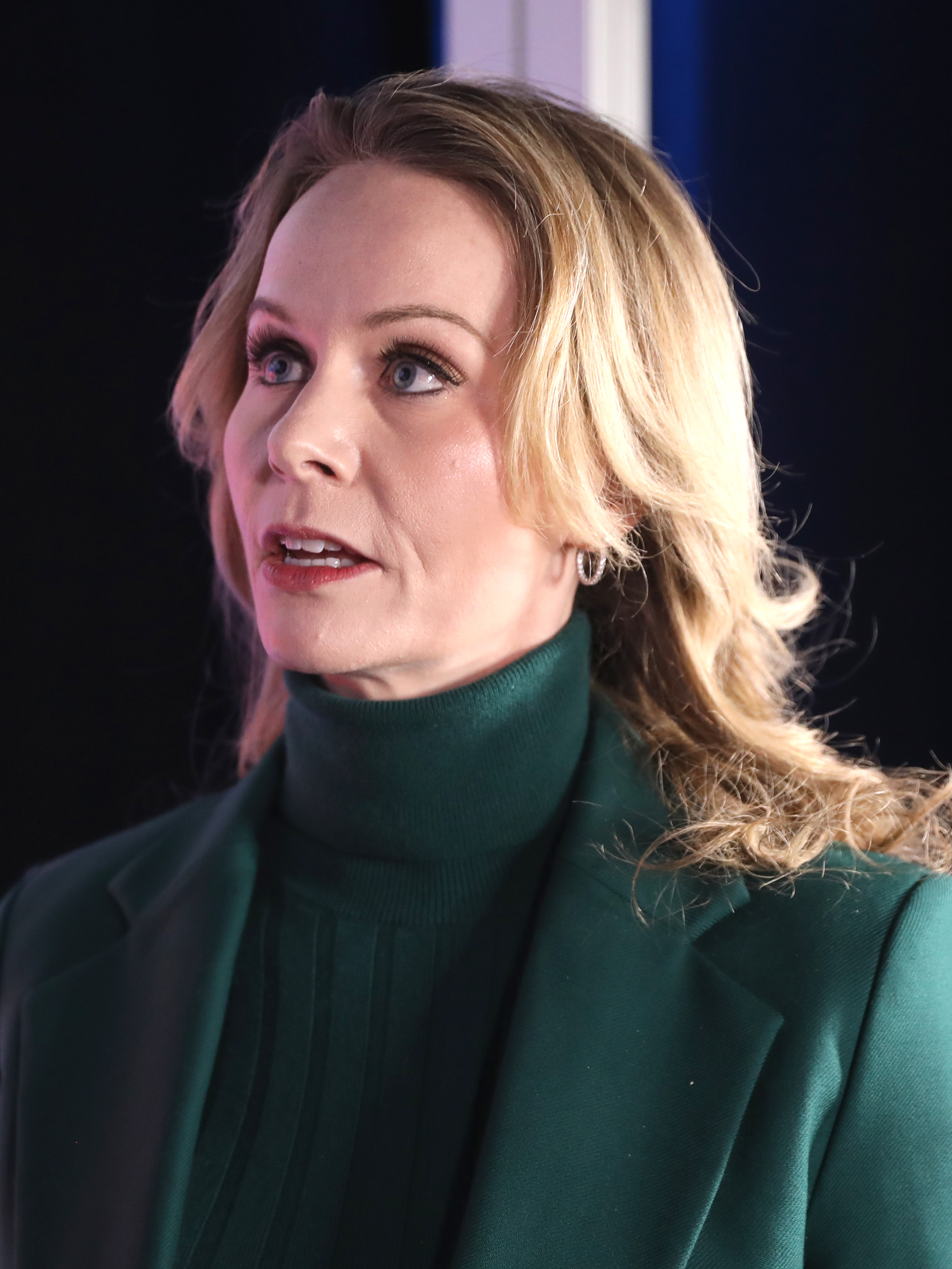
| Candidate | Lisa Murkowski | Kelly Tshibaka |
| Party | Republican | Republican |
| First round | 113,495; 43.4% | 111,480; 42.6% |
| Final round | 136,330; 53.7% | 117,534; 46.3% |
- Murkowski: 50–60% 60–70% 70–80% 80–90% Tshibaka: 50–60% 60–70% 70–80%
U.S. senator before election
Lisa Murkowski
Republican
Elected U.S. senator
Lisa Murkowski
Republican

Three-term Republican Lisa Murkowski was re-elected in 2016 with 44.4% of the vote. Alaska voters passed a ballot initiative in 2020 that adopted a new top-four ranked-choice voting system: all candidates compete in a nonpartisan blanket primary, the top four candidates advance to the general election, and the winner is determined by instant-runoff voting using ranked-choice ballots. On March 30, following the Alaska Republican Party's decision to censure senator Murkowski, former Alaska Department of Administration commissioner Kelly Tshibaka announced her campaign against Murkowski, later receiving Donald Trump's endorsement. Republican governor Mike Dunleavy, who was considered another potential challenger to Murkowski, instead ran for re-election.

Murkowski, Tshibaka, Republican Buzz Kelley, and Democrat Pat Chesbro advanced to the general election. Kelley suspended his campaign in September and endorsed Tshibaka, although his name remained on the ballot.

Murkowski received a slight plurality of the first-choice votes and a majority of all votes following the ranked choice tabulation, winning re-election to a fourth full term.

Alaska blanket primary
| Party | Candidate | Votes | % |
|---|---|---|---|
| Republican | Lisa Murkowski (incumbent) | 85,794 | 45.05 |
| Republican | Kelly Tshibaka | 73,414 | 38.55 |
| Democratic | Patricia Chesboro | 12,989 | 6.82 |
| Republican | Buzz Kelley | 4,055 | 2.13 |
| Republican | Pat Nolin | 2,004 | 1.05 |
| Democratic | Edgar Blatchford | 1,981 | 1.04 |
| Democratic | Ivan R. Taylor | 1,897 | 1.00 |
| Republican | Sam Merrill | 1,529 | 0.80 |
| Libertarian | Sean Thorne | 1,399 | 0.73 |
| Independent | Shoshana Gungurstein | 853 | 0.45 |
| Independence | Joe Stephens | 805 | 0.42 |
| Republican | John Schiess | 734 | 0.39 |
| Independence | Dustin Darden | 649 | 0.34 |
| Republican | Kendall L. Shorkey | 627 | 0.33 |
| Republican | Karl Speights | 613 | 0.32 |
| Independent | Jeremy Keller | 405 | 0.21 |
| Independent | Sid Hill | 274 | 0.14 |
| Independent | Huhnkie Lee | 238 | 0.12 |
| Independent | Dave Darden | 198 | 0.10 |
| Total votes | | 190,458 | 100.00 |

Alaska general election
| Party | Candidate | Maximum round | Maximum votes | Share in maximum round | Maximum votes First round votes Transfer votes |
|---|---|---|---|---|---|
| Republican | Lisa Murkowski (incumbent) | 4 | 136,330 | 53.70% | |
| Republican | Kelly Tshibaka | 4 | 117,534 | 46.30% | |
| Democratic | Pat Chesboro | 3 | 29,134 | 11.20% | |
| Republican | Buzz Kelley (withdrawn) | 2 | 8,575 | 3.26% | |
| Write-In | | 1 | 2,028 | 0.77% | |

== Arizona ==
Arizona election
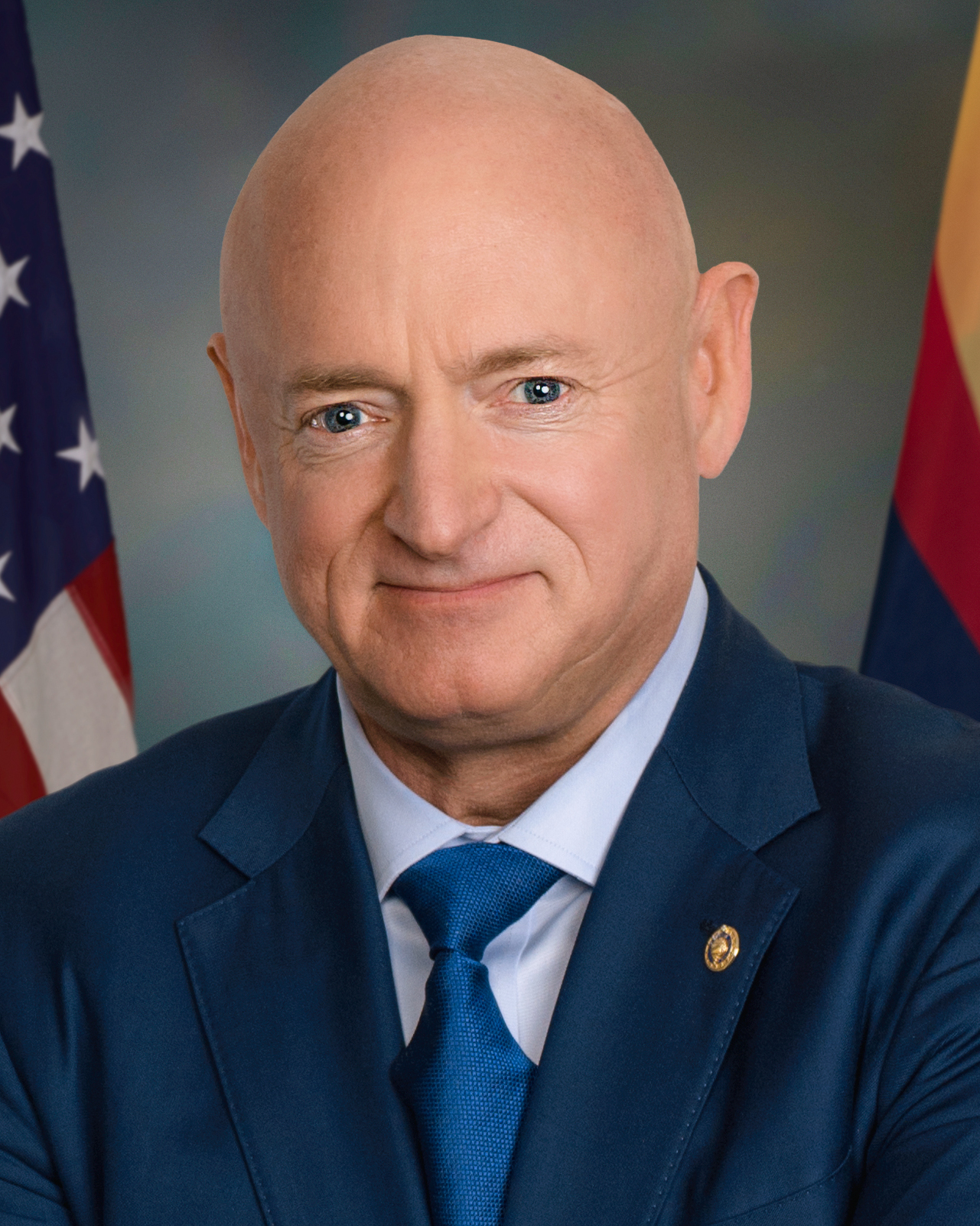

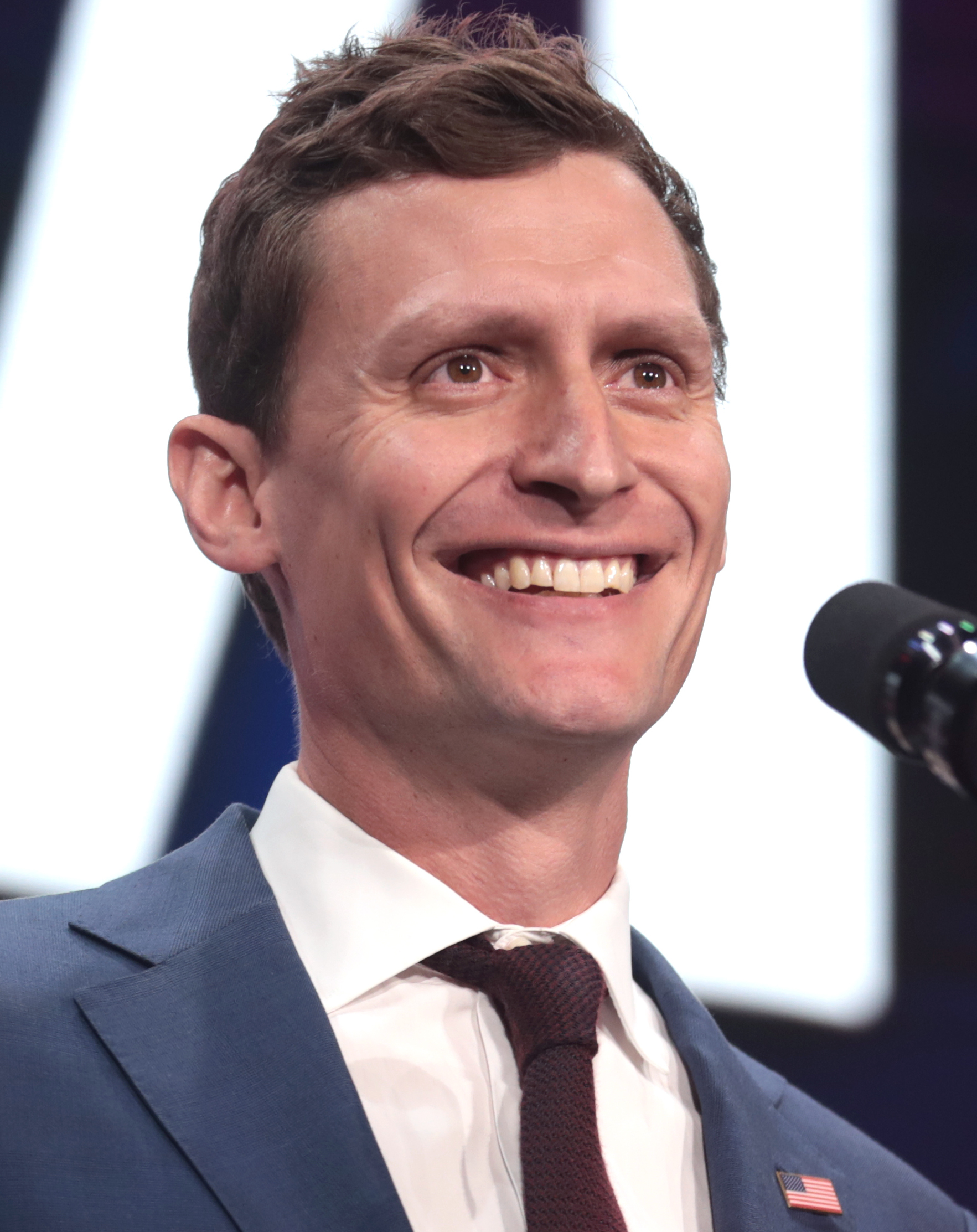
| Nominee | Mark Kelly | Blake Masters |
| Party | Democratic | Republican |
| Popular vote | 1,322,027 | 1,196,308 |
| Percentage | 51.4% | 46.5% |
- County results Kelly: 50–60% 60–70% Masters: 50–60% 60–70% 70–80%
U.S. senator before election
Mark Kelly
Democratic
Elected U.S. Senator
Mark Kelly
Democratic

Incumbent Democrat Mark Kelly took office on December 2, 2020, after winning a special election with 51.2% of the vote.

Six-term senator and 2008 Republican presidential nominee John McCain was re-elected to this seat in 2016. He died on August 25, 2018, and former U.S. senator Jon Kyl was appointed to replace him. Kyl resigned at the end of 2018 and U.S. representative Martha McSally was appointed to replace him. Kelly defeated McSally in the 2020 special election.

In the Republican primary, Blake Masters, the chairman of the Thiel Foundation, defeated Jim Lamon, chair of the solar power company Depcom, and Arizona attorney general Mark Brnovich.

Kelly defeated Masters, winning election to his first full term.

Arizona Democratic primary
| Party | Candidate | Votes | % |
|---|---|---|---|
| Democratic | Mark Kelly (incumbent) | 589,400 | 100.00 |
| Total votes | | 589,400 | 100.00 |

Arizona Republican primary
| Party | Candidate | Votes | % |
|---|---|---|---|
| Republican | Blake Masters | 327,198 | 40.24 |
| Republican | Jim Lamon | 228,467 | 28.10 |
| Republican | Mark Brnovich | 144,092 | 17.72 |
| Republican | Mick McGuire | 71,100 | 8.75 |
| Republican | Justin Olson | 41,985 | 5.16 |
| Write-in | | 226 | 0.03 |
| Total votes | | 814,068 | 100.00 |

Arizona general election
| Party | Candidate | Votes | % | ±% |
|---|---|---|---|---|
| Democratic | Mark Kelly (incumbent) | 1,322,027 | 51.39% | +0.23 |
| Republican | Blake Masters | 1,196,308 | 46.51% | −2.30 |
| Libertarian | Marc Victor (withdrawn) | 53,762 | 2.09% | N/A |
| Write-in | | 197 | 0.01% | −0.02 |
| Total votes | | 2,572,294 | 100.0% | |
| Democratic hold | | | | |

== Arkansas ==
Arkansas election
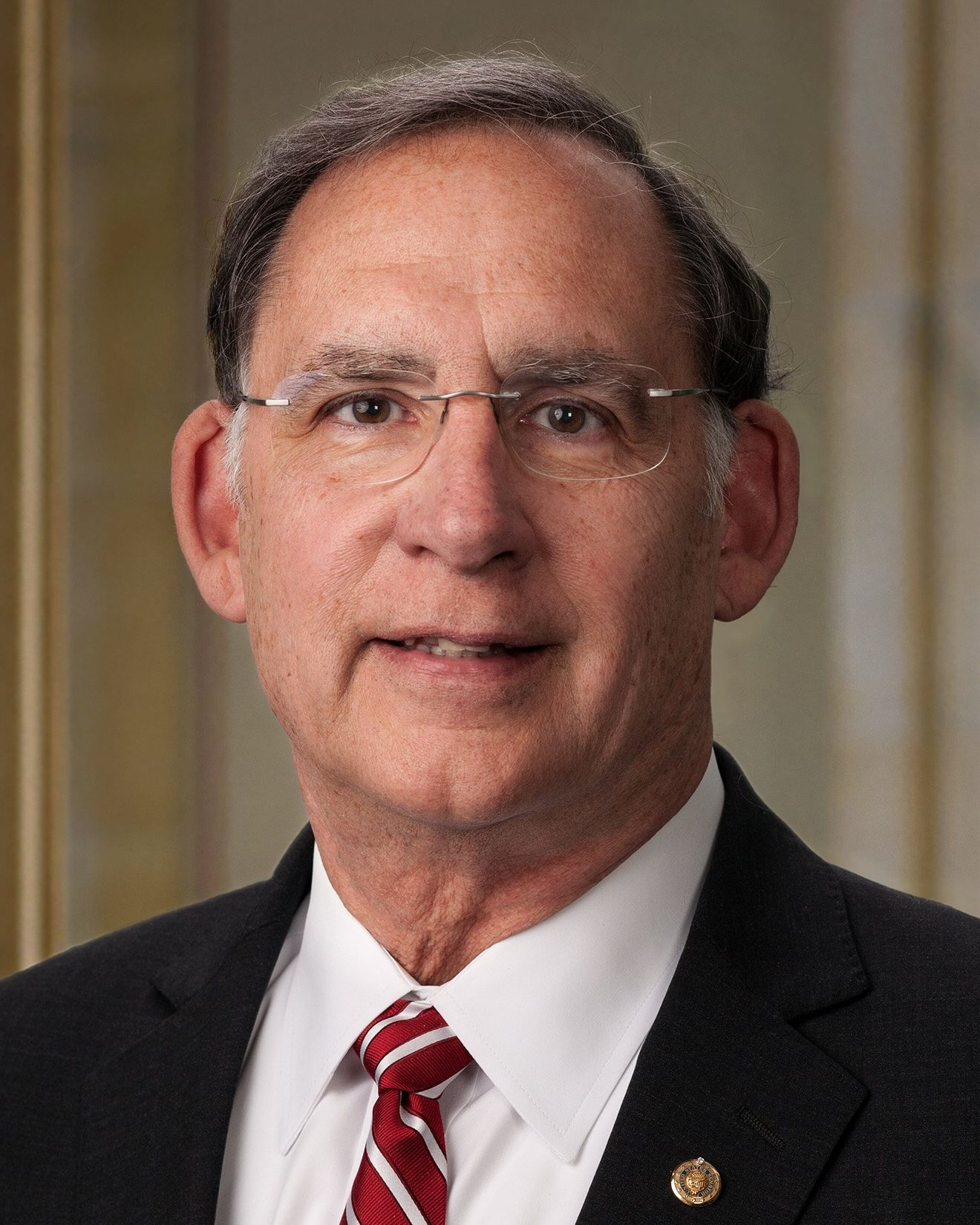

| Nominee | John Boozman | Natalie James |
| Party | Republican | Democratic |
| Popular vote | 592,437 | 280,187 |
| Percentage | 65.7% | 31.1% |
- County results Boozman: 40–50% 50–60% 60–70% 70–80% 80–90% James: 50–60%
U.S. senator before election
John Boozman
Republican
Elected U.S. senator
John Boozman
Republican

Two-term Republican John Boozman was re-elected in 2016 with 59.8% of the vote. Boozman ran for a third term.

Boozman defeated former NFL player and U.S. Army veteran Jake Bequette, gun range owner and 2018 gubernatorial candidate Jan Morgan, and pastor Heath Loftis in the Republican primary. A fourth challenger, corporate analyst Michael Deel withdrew prior to the primary election citing a lack of viability.

Natalie James, a real estate broker from Little Rock, defeated Dan Whitfield, who attempted to run as an independent for Arkansas' other U.S. Senate seat in 2020 but failed to meet the ballot access requirements, and former Pine Bluff City alderman Jack Foster in the Democratic primary.

Boozman defeated James, winning re-election to a third term.

Arkansas Republican primary
| Party | Candidate | Votes | % |
|---|---|---|---|
| Republican | John Boozman (incumbent) | 201,677 | 58.03 |
| Republican | Jake Bequette | 71,809 | 20.66 |
| Republican | Jan Morgan | 65,958 | 18.98 |
| Republican | Heath Loftis | 8,112 | 2.33 |
| Total votes | | 347,556 | 100.00 |

Arkansas Democratic primary
| Party | Candidate | Votes | % |
|---|---|---|---|
| Democratic | Natalie James | 49,722 | 54.09 |
| Democratic | Dan Whitfield | 28,319 | 30.80 |
| Democratic | Jack Foster | 13,891 | 15.11 |
| Total votes | | 91,932 | 100.00 |

Arkansas general election
| Party | Candidate | Votes | % | ±% |
|---|---|---|---|---|
| Republican | John Boozman (incumbent) | 592,437 | 65.73% | +5.96 |
| Democratic | Natalie James | 280,187 | 31.09% | −5.08 |
| Libertarian | Kenneth Cates | 28,682 | 3.18% | −0.78 |
| Total votes | | 901,306 | 100.0% | |
| Republican hold | | | | |

== California ==
California election
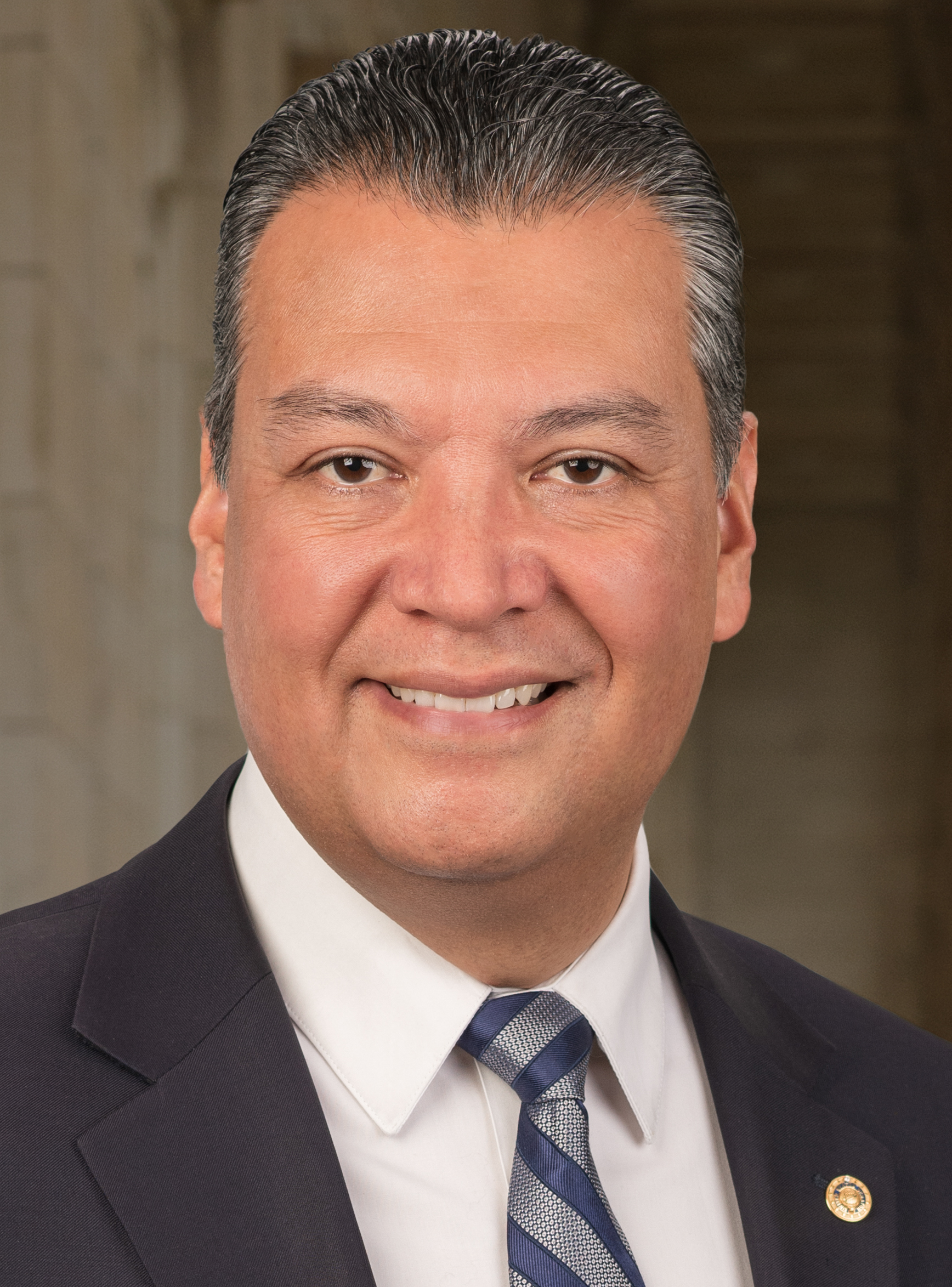

| Candidate | Alex Padilla | Mark Meuser |
| Party | Democratic | Republican |
| Special election | 6,559,308; 60.9% | 4,212,450; 39.1% |
| Regular election | 6,621,621; 61.1% | 4,222,029; 38.9% |
- Padilla: 50–60% 60–70% 70–80% 80–90% Meuser: 50–60% 60–70% 70–80%
U.S. senator before election
Alex Padilla
Democratic
Elected U.S. senator
Alex Padilla
Democratic

Incumbent Democrat Alex Padilla took office on January 20, 2021. He was appointed by Governor Gavin Newsom following the resignation of incumbent Democrat Kamala Harris on January 18, 2021, in advance of her swearing-in as Vice President of the United States.

Due to a rule change, there were two ballot items for the same seat: a general election, to elect a Class 3 senator to a full term beginning with the 118th United States Congress, sworn in on January 3, 2023, and a special election, to fill that seat for the final weeks of the 117th Congress. Padilla ran in both races, as did the Republican nominee, attorney Mark Meuser. With his advancement out of the primary, Mark P. Meuser (/ˈmɔɪʒər/ MOY-zhər) became the first Republican since 2012 to advance to the general election, as both the 2016 and 2018 Senate elections solely featured Democrats as the top two candidates. This race was a rematch between the two, as both had previously run for the secretary of state in 2018. Padilla defeated Meuser in both races, winning election to his first full term.

California blanket primary
| Party | Candidate | Votes | % |
|---|---|---|---|
| Democratic | Alex Padilla (incumbent) | 3,725,544 | 54.12 |
| Republican | Mark Meuser | 1,028,374 | 14.94 |
| Republican | Cordie Williams | 474,321 | 6.89 |
| Republican | Jon Elist | 289,716 | 4.21 |
| Republican | Chuck Smith | 266,766 | 3.88 |
| Republican | James P. Bradley | 235,788 | 3.43 |
| Democratic | Douglas Howard Pierce | 116,771 | 1.70 |
| Peace and Freedom | John Parker | 105,477 | 1.53 |
| Republican | Sarah Sun Liew | 76,994 | 1.12 |
| Democratic | Dan O'Dowd | 74,916 | 1.09 |
| Democratic | Akinyemi Agbede | 70,971 | 1.03 |
| Republican | Myron L. Hall | 66,161 | 0.96 |
| Democratic | Timothy J. Urisch | 58,348 | 0.85 |
| Republican | Robert George Lucero Jr. | 53,398 | 0.78 |
| Green | Henk Conn | 35,983 | 0.52 |
| No party preference | Eleanor Garcia | 34,625 | 0.50 |
| Republican | Carlos Guillermo Tapia | 33,870 | 0.49 |
| Green | Pamela Elizondo | 31,981 | 0.46 |
| Republican | Enrique Petris | 31,883 | 0.46 |
| Democratic | Obaidul Huq Pirjada | 27,889 | 0.41 |
| No party preference | Daphne Bradford | 26,900 | 0.39 |
| No party preference | Don J. Grundmann | 10,181 | 0.15 |
| No party preference | Deon D. Jenkins | 6,936 | 0.10 |
| Write-in | | 272 | 0.00 |
| Total votes | | 6,884,065 | 100.00 |

California general election
| Party | Candidate | Votes | % | ±% |
|---|---|---|---|---|
| Democratic | Alex Padilla (incumbent) | 6,621,616 | 61.06% | N/A |
| Republican | Mark Meuser | 4,222,025 | 38.94% | N/A |
| Total votes | | 10,843,641 | 100.0% | |
| Democratic hold | | | | |

== Colorado ==
Colorado election
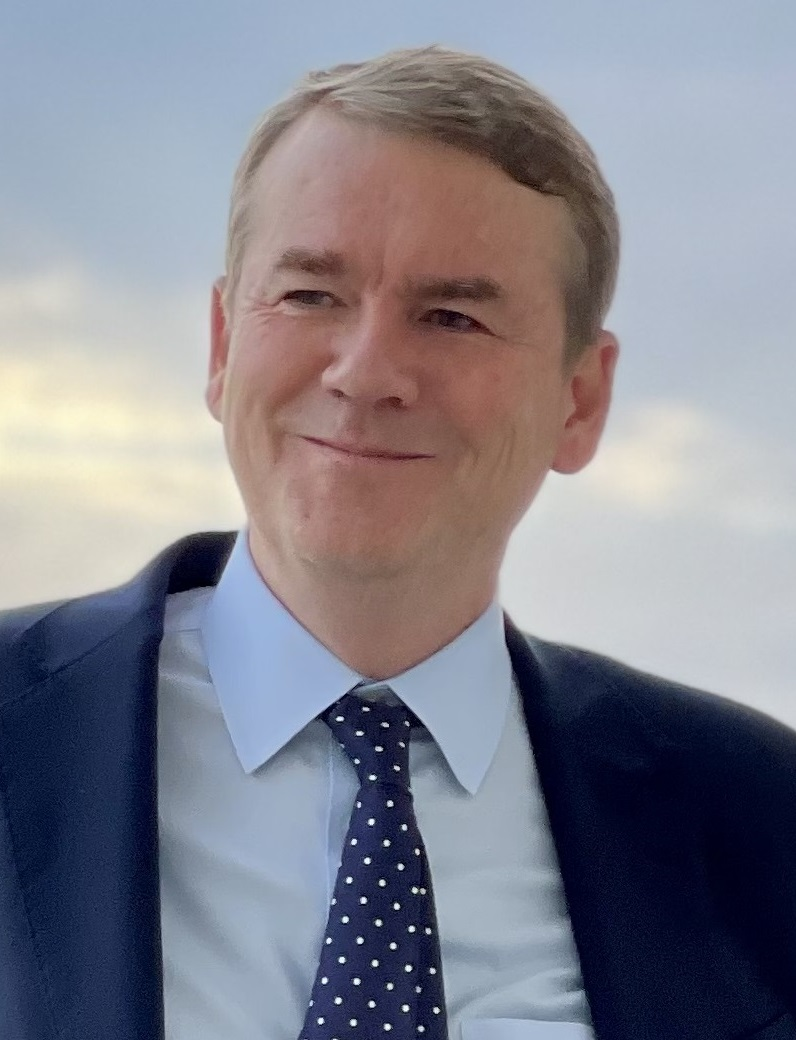

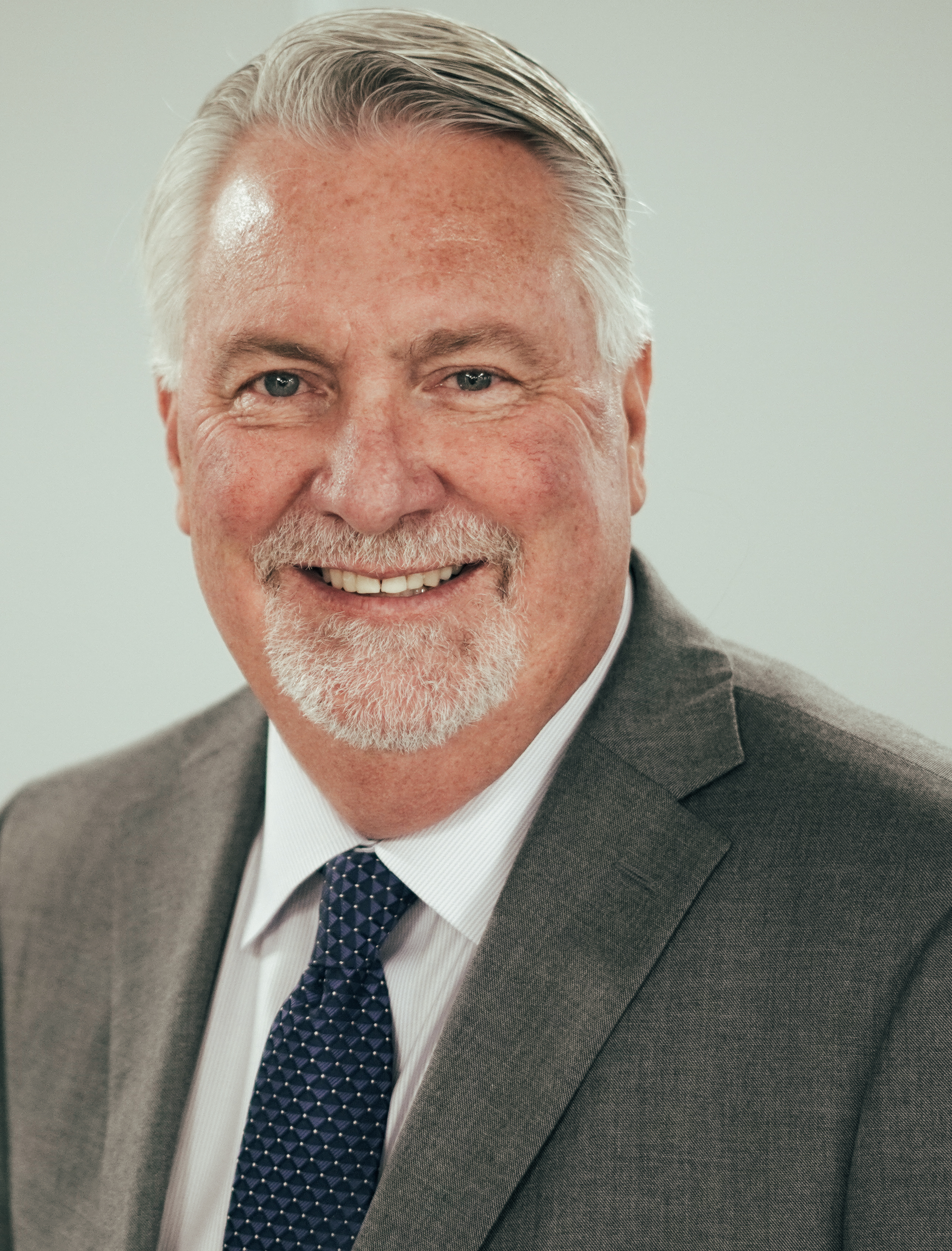
| Nominee | Michael Bennet | Joe O'Dea |
| Party | Democratic | Republican |
| Popular vote | 1,397,170 | 1,031,693 |
| Percentage | 55.9% | 41.3% |
- County results Bennet: 40–50% 50–60% 60–70% 70–80% 80–90% O'Dea: 40–50% 50–60% 60–70% 70–80% 80–90%
U.S. senator before election
Michael Bennet
Democratic
Elected U.S. Senator
Michael Bennet
Democratic

Two-term Democrat Michael Bennet took office on January 21, 2009, after being appointed by then Colorado governor Bill Ritter to replace outgoing Democrat Ken Salazar, who was nominated by then president Barack Obama to serve as United States secretary of the interior. He had narrowly won reelection bids, in 2010 to his first full term, with 48.08% of the vote, and, in 2016 to his second, with 49.97% of the vote.

In the Republican primary, construction company owner Joe O'Dea defeated state representative Ron Hanks.

Bennet defeated O'Dea, winning election to his third full term.

Colorado Democratic primary
| Party | Candidate | Votes | % |
|---|---|---|---|
| Democratic | Michael Bennet (incumbent) | 516,985 | 100.00 |
| Total votes | | 516,985 | 100.00 |

Colorado Republican primary
| Party | Candidate | Votes | % |
|---|---|---|---|
| Republican | Joe O'Dea | 345,060 | 54.44 |
| Republican | Ron Hanks | 288,483 | 45.51 |
| Write-In | Daniel Hendricks | 302 | 0.05 |
| Total votes | | 633,845 | 100.00 |

Colorado general election
| Party | Candidate | Votes | % | ±% |
|---|---|---|---|---|
| Democratic | Michael Bennet (incumbent) | 1,397,170 | 55.88% | +5.91 |
| Republican | Joe O'Dea | 1,031,693 | 41.26% | −3.05 |
| Libertarian | Brian Peotter | 43,534 | 1.74% | −1.88 |
| Unity | T. J. Cole | 16,379 | 0.66% | +0.32 |
| Approval Voting | Frank Atwood | 11,354 | 0.45% | N/A |
| Write-in | | 71 | 0.00% | N/A |
| Total votes | | 2,500,201 | 100.0% | |
| Democratic hold | | | | |

== Connecticut ==
Connecticut election
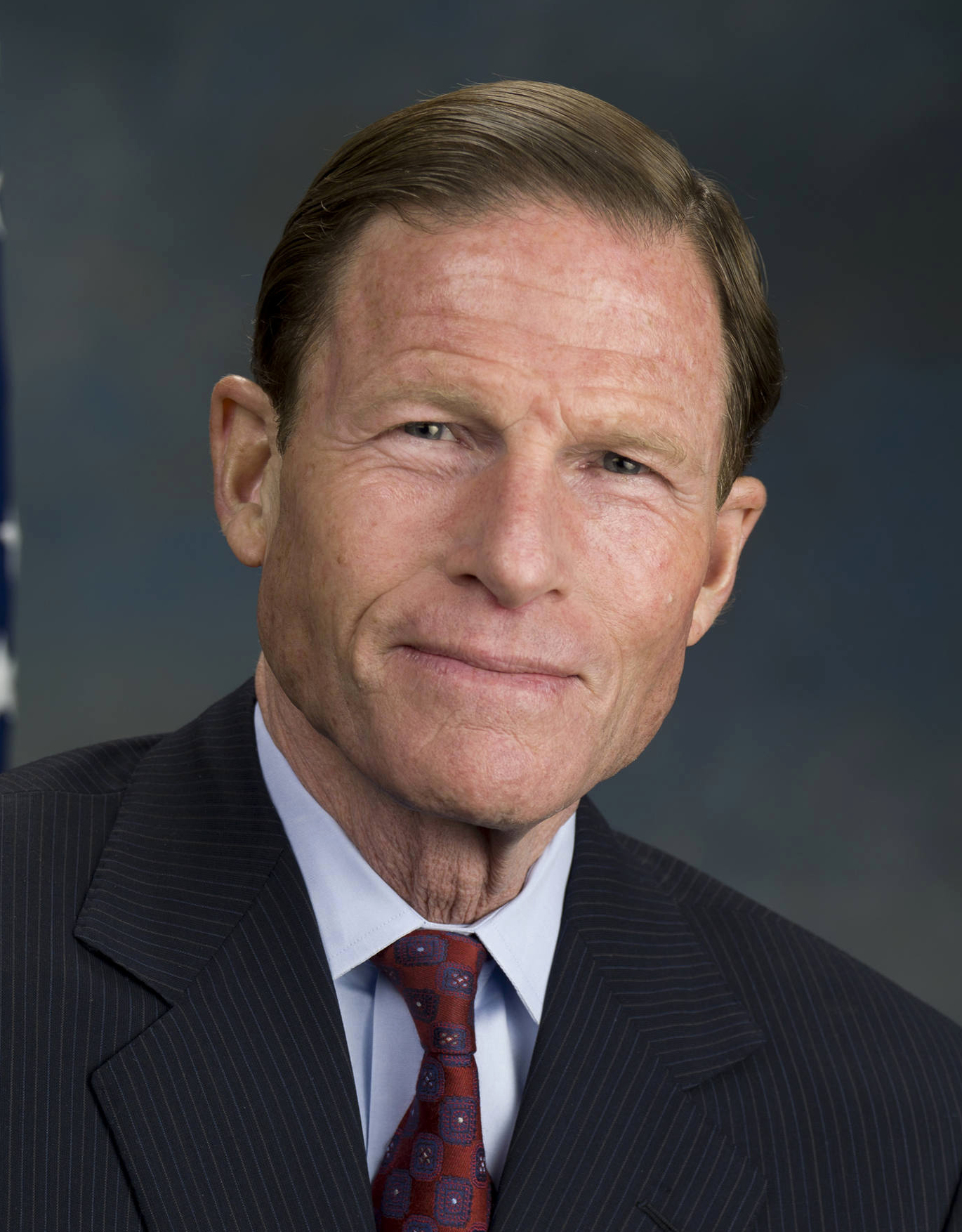

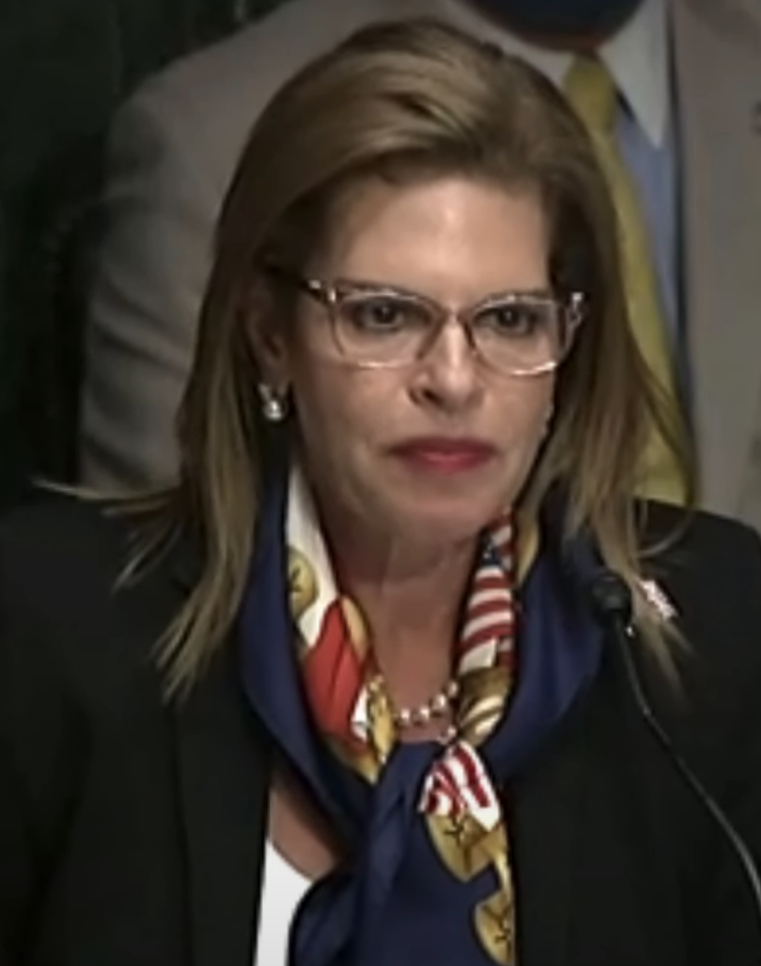
| Nominee | Richard Blumenthal | Leora Levy |
| Party | Democratic | Republican |
| Popular vote | 723,864 | 535,943 |
| Percentage | 57.5% | 42.5% |
- County results Blumenthal: 50–60% 60–70% Levy: 50–60%
U.S. senator before election
Richard Blumenthal
Democratic
Elected U.S. senator
Richard Blumenthal
Democratic

Two-term Democrat Richard Blumenthal was re-elected in 2016 with 63.2% of the vote.

Former state House minority leader Themis Klarides ran for the Republican nomination, but lost to commodities trader Leora Levy.

Connecticut Republican primary
| Party | Candidate | Votes | % |
|---|---|---|---|
| Republican | Leora Levy | 46,774 | 50.60 |
| Republican | Themis Klarides | 37,003 | 40.03 |
| Republican | Peter Lumaj | 8,665 | 9.37 |
| Total votes | | 92,442 | 100.00 |

Connecticut general election
| Party | Candidate | Votes | % | ±% |
|---|---|---|---|---|
| Democratic | Richard Blumenthal (incumbent) | 723,864 | 57.45% | −5.74 |
| Republican | Leora Levy | 535,943 | 42.54% | +7.92 |
| Write-in | | 80 | 0.00% | ±0.00 |
| Total votes | | 1,259,887 | 100.0% | |
| Democratic hold | | | | |

== Florida ==
Florida election
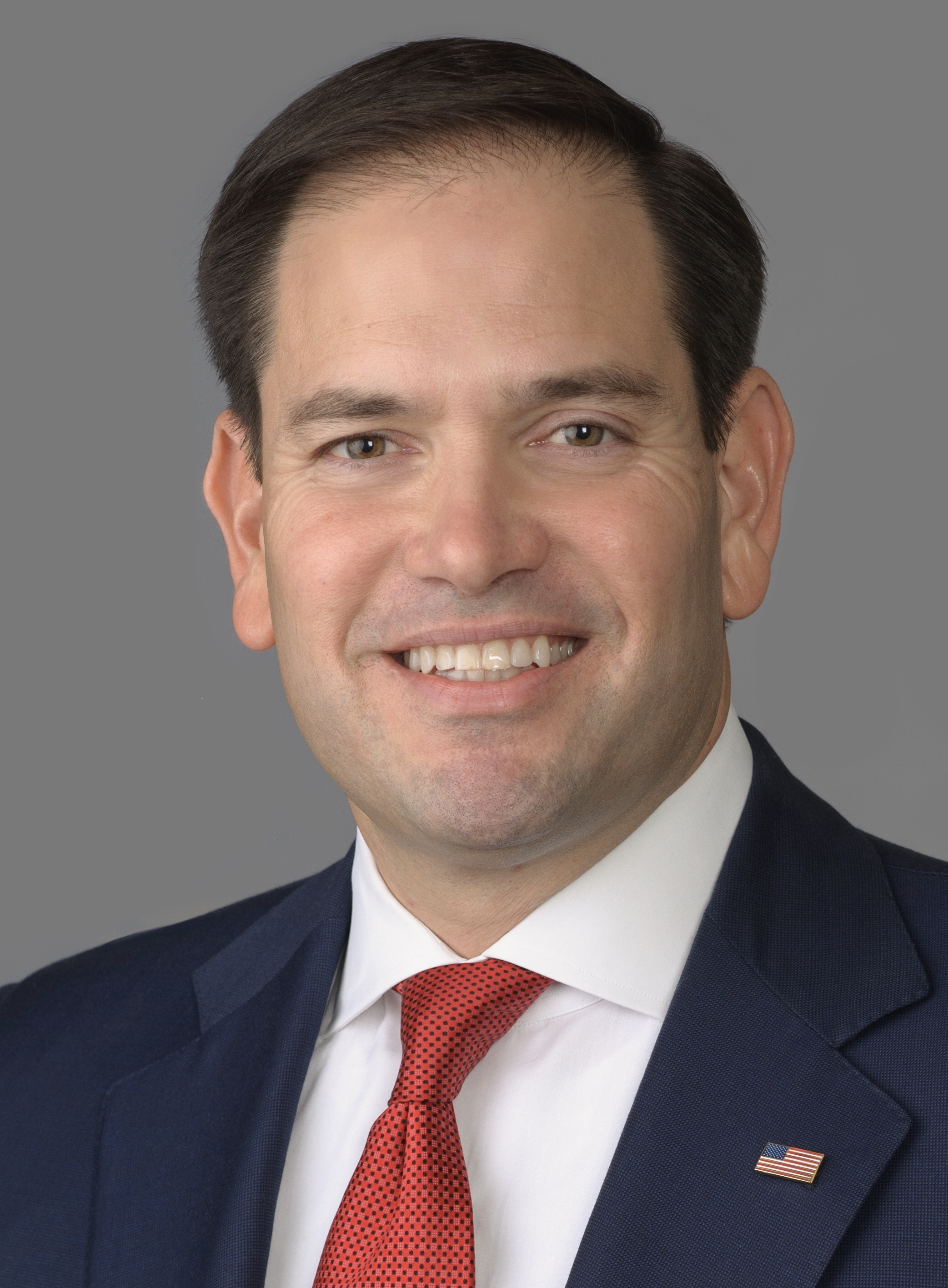

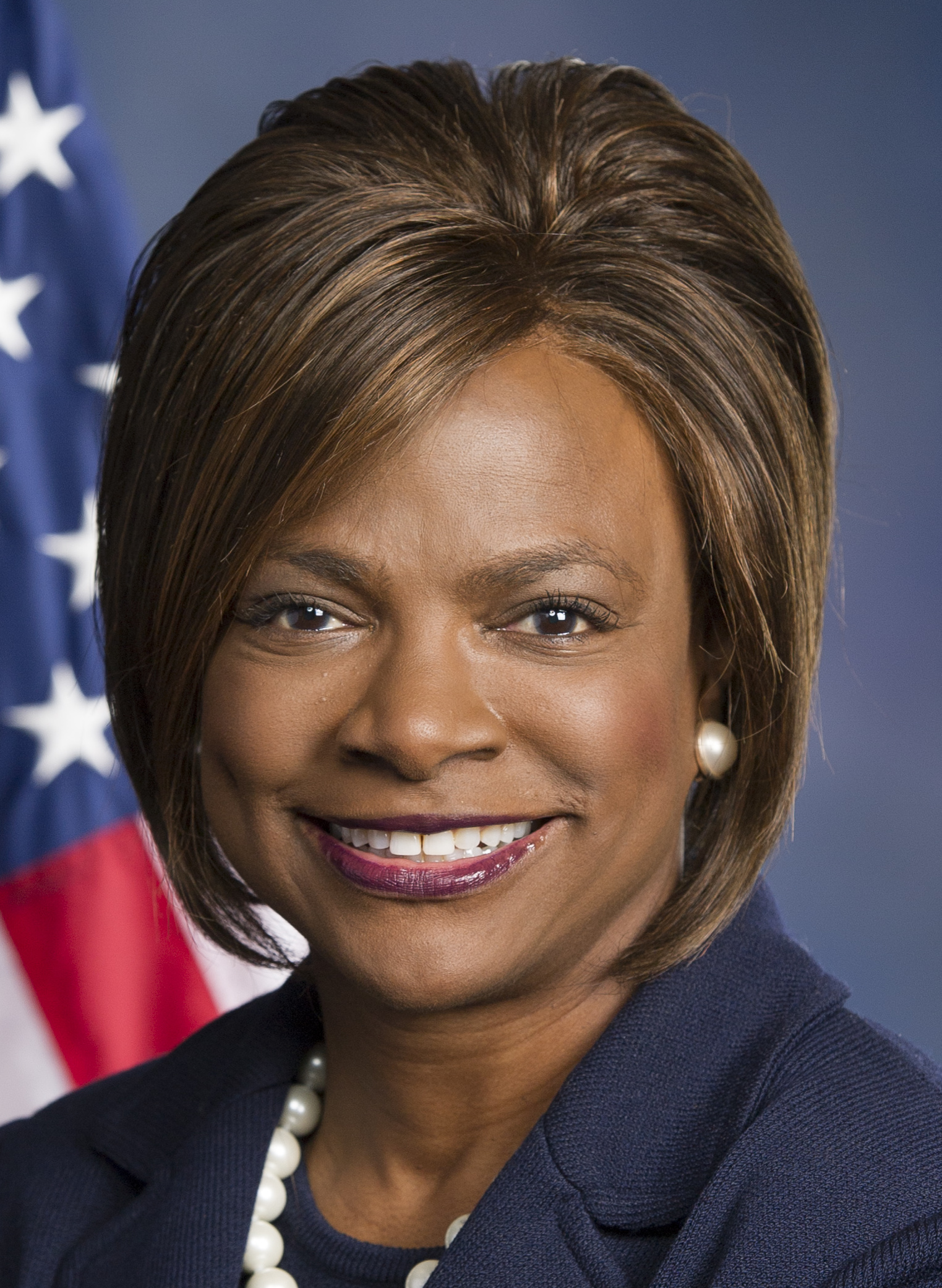
| Nominee | Marco Rubio | Val Demings |
| Party | Republican | Democratic |
| Popular vote | 4,474,847 | 3,201,522 |
| Percentage | 57.7% | 41.3% |
- County results Rubio: 50–60% 60–70% 70–80% 80–90% 90–100% Demings: 40–50% 50–60% 60–70%
U.S. senator before election
Marco Rubio
Republican
Elected U.S. senator
Marco Rubio
Republican

Two-term Republican Marco Rubio was re-elected in 2016 with 52% of the vote. He announced on November 9, 2020, via Facebook, that he was running for re-election.

U.S. representative Val Demings was the Democratic nominee.

Ivanka Trump, daughter and former senior advisor to former president Donald Trump, was seen as a potential candidate to challenge Rubio for the Republican nomination. However, on February 18, 2021, it was confirmed that she would not seek the nomination.

Rubio defeated Demings, winning re-election to a third term.

Florida Democratic primary
| Party | Candidate | Votes | % |
|---|---|---|---|
| Democratic | Val Demings | 1,263,706 | 84.29 |
| Democratic | Brian Rush | 94,185 | 6.28 |
| Democratic | William Sanchez | 84,576 | 5.64 |
| Democratic | Ricardo De La Fuente | 56,749 | 3.79 |
| Total votes | | 1,499,216 | 100.00 |

Florida general election
| Party | Candidate | Votes | % | ±% |
|---|---|---|---|---|
| Republican | Marco Rubio (incumbent) | 4,474,847 | 57.68% | +5.70 |
| Democratic | Val Demings | 3,201,522 | 41.27% | −3.04 |
| Libertarian | Dennis Misigoy | 32,177 | 0.41% | −1.71 |
| Independent | Steven B. Grant | 31,816 | 0.41% | N/A |
| Independent | Tuan TQ Nguyen | 17,385 | 0.22% | N/A |
| Write-in | | 267 | 0.00% | ±0.00 |
| Total votes | | 7,758,126 | 100.0% | |
| Republican hold | | | | |

== Georgia ==
Georgia election
- November 8, 2022 (first round); December 6, 2022 (runoff)
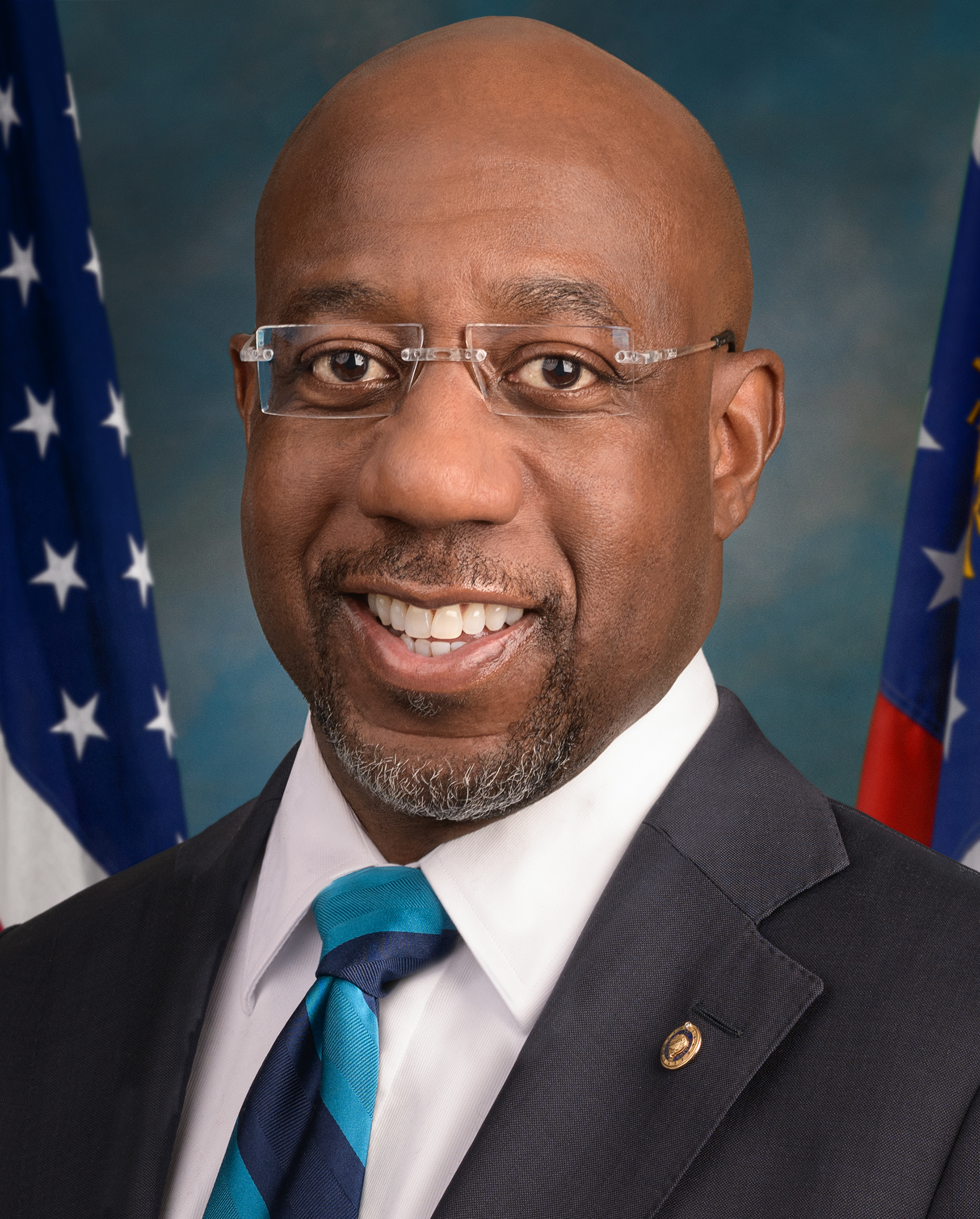

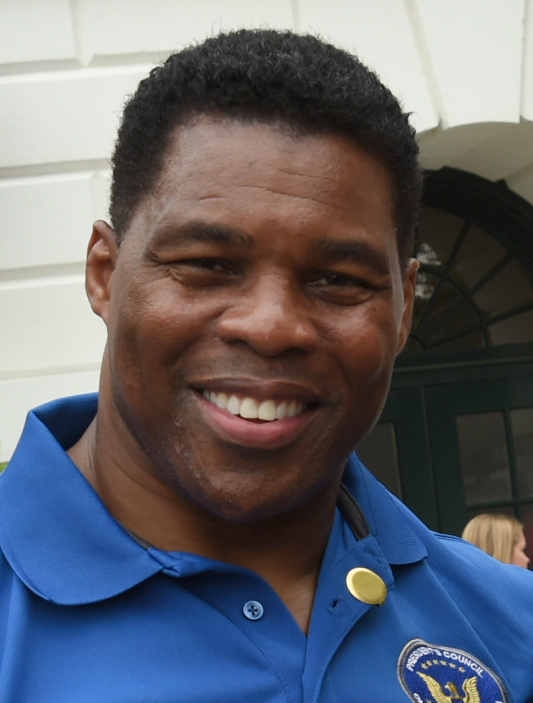
| Candidate | Raphael Warnock | Herschel Walker |
| Party | Democratic | Republican |
| First round | 1,946,117; 49.4% | 1,908,442; 48.5% |
| Runoff | 1,820,633; 51.4% | 1,721,244; 48.6% |
- Warnock: 50–60% 60–70% 70–80% 80–90% Walker: 40–50% 50–60% 60–70% 70–80% 80–90% >90%
U.S. senator before election
Raphael Warnock
Democratic
Elected U.S. Senator
Raphael Warnock
Democratic

Incumbent Democrat Raphael Warnock won the 2020–2021 special election against incumbent Republican Kelly Loeffler to fill the remainder of former senator Johnny Isakson's term. Isakson resigned at the end of 2019 due to health problems and eventually died less than two years later, in 2021. Loeffler was appointed by Governor Brian Kemp following Isakson's resignation. No candidate in the open election on November 3 received the 50% required by Georgia law to avoid a run-off, a type of election colloquially known as a "jungle primary"—Warnock received just 32.9% of the vote—and so, a run-off election between Warnock and Loeffler was held on January 5, 2021, which Warnock won with 51% of the vote.

Former Republican senator David Perdue, who narrowly lost his race to Democratic challenger Jon Ossoff in 2021, and former U.S. representative Doug Collins both considered challenging Warnock, but eventually announced they were not running.

Former NFL player Herschel Walker, who had been endorsed by former president Donald Trump, defeated banking executive Latham Saddler and others in the Republican primary.

In the general election, no candidate received a majority of the vote. Warnock defeated Walker in a runoff between the top-two finishers on December 6.

Georgia Democratic primary
| Party | Candidate | Votes | % |
|---|---|---|---|
| Democratic | Raphael Warnock (incumbent) | 702,610 | 96.04 |
| Democratic | Tamara Johnson-Shealey | 29,984 | 3.96 |
| Total votes | | 731,594 | 100.00 |

Georgia Republican primary
| Party | Candidate | Votes | % |
|---|---|---|---|
| Republican | Herschel Walker | 803,560 | 68.18 |
| Republican | Gary Black | 157,370 | 13.35 |
| Republican | Latham Saddler | 104,471 | 8.86 |
| Republican | Josh Clark | 46,693 | 3.96 |
| Republican | Kelvin King | 37,930 | 3.22 |
| Republican | Jonathan McColumn | 28,601 | 2.43 |
| Total votes | | 1,178,625 | 100.00 |

Georgia general election
| Party | Candidate | Votes | % | ±% |
|---|---|---|---|---|
| Democratic | Raphael Warnock (incumbent) | 1,946,117 | 49.44% | +1.05 |
| Republican | Herschel Walker | 1,908,442 | 48.49% | −0.88 |
| Libertarian | Chase Oliver | 81,365 | 2.07% | +1.35 |
| Total votes | | 3,935,924 | 100.0% | |

Georgia general election runoff
| Party | Candidate | Votes | % | ±% |
|---|---|---|---|---|
| Democratic | Raphael Warnock (incumbent) | 1,820,633 | 51.40% | +0.36 |
| Republican | Herschel Walker | 1,721,244 | 48.60% | −0.36 |
| Total votes | | 3,541,877 | 100.0% | |
| Democratic hold | | | | |

== Hawaii ==
Hawaii election
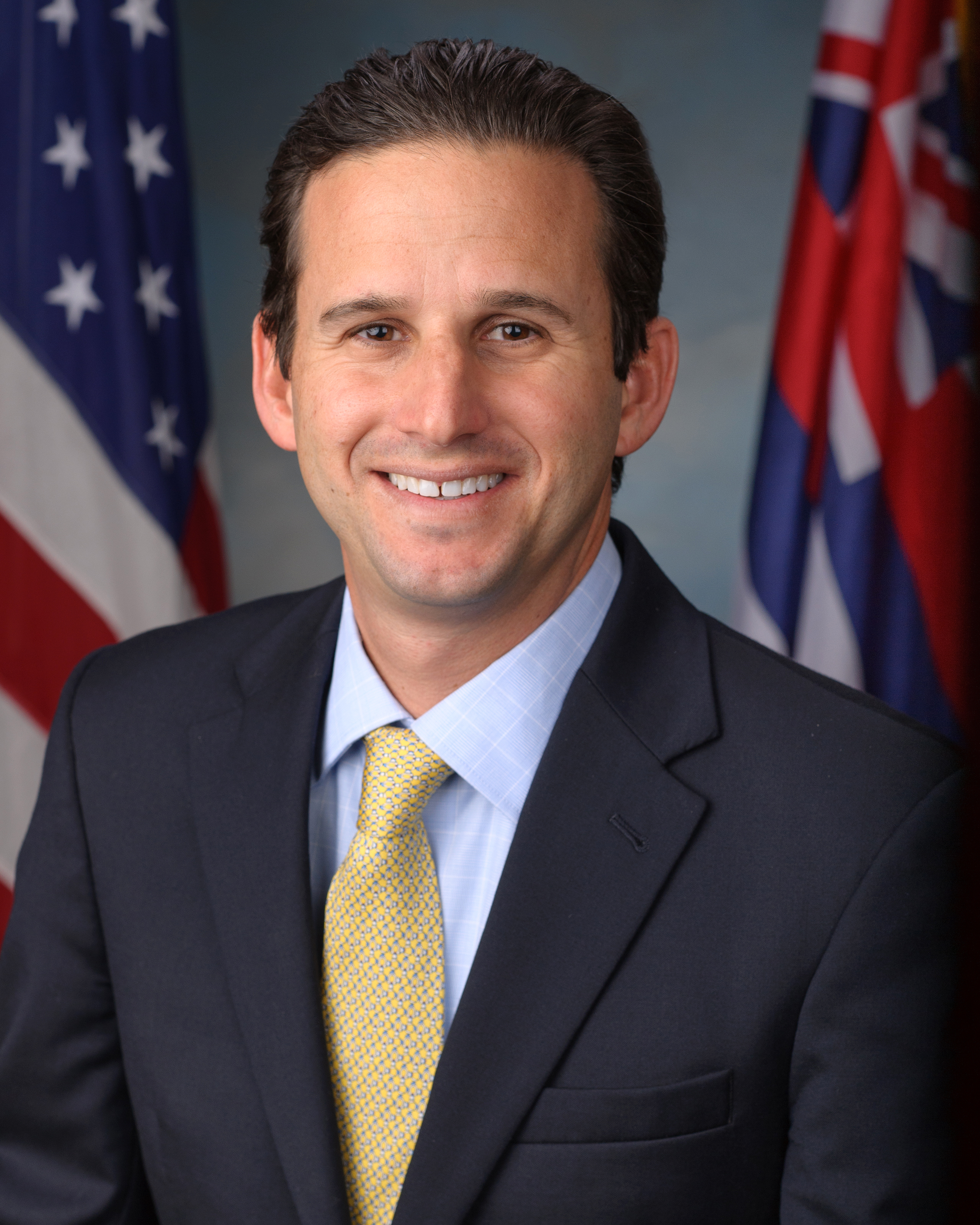

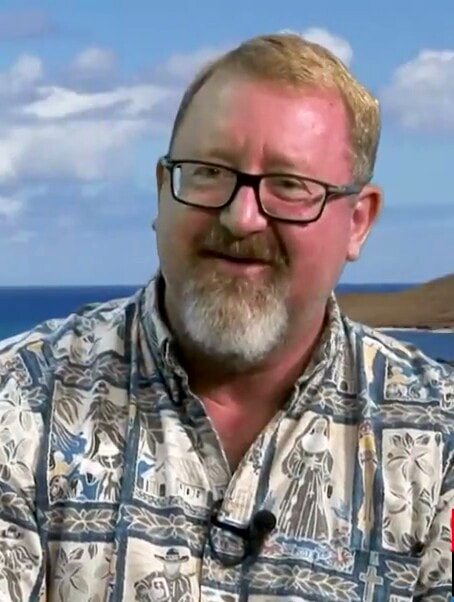
| Nominee | Brian Schatz | Bob McDermott |
| Party | Democratic | Republican |
| Popular vote | 290,894 | 106,358 |
| Percentage | 71.2% | 26.0% |
- County results Schatz: 70–80%
U.S. senator before election
Brian Schatz
Democratic
Elected U.S. senator
Brian Schatz
Democratic

One-term Democrat Brian Schatz was appointed to the Senate in 2012, following the death of incumbent Daniel Inouye. He won a special election to finish Inouye's term in 2014, and won his first full term in 2016 with 73.6% of the vote. Republican state representative Bob McDermott challenged Schatz.

Hawaii Democratic primary
| Party | Candidate | Votes | % |
|---|---|---|---|
| Democratic | Brian Schatz (incumbent) | 228,595 | 93.56 |
| Democratic | Steve Tataii | 15,725 | 6.44 |
| Total votes | | 244,320 | 100.00 |

Hawaii Republican primary
| Party | Candidate | Votes | % |
|---|---|---|---|
| Republican | Bob McDermott | 25,686 | 39.56 |
| Republican | Timothy Dalhouse | 17,158 | 26.42 |
| Republican | Wallyn Kanoelani Christian | 9,497 | 14.62 |
| Republican | Steven Bond | 6,407 | 9.87 |
| Republican | Asia Lavonne | 6,187 | 9.53 |
| Total votes | | 64,935 | 100.00 |

Hawaii general election
| Party | Candidate | Votes | % | ±% |
|---|---|---|---|---|
| Democratic | Brian Schatz (incumbent) | 290,894 | 71.21% | −2.40 |
| Republican | Bob McDermott | 106,358 | 26.04% | +3.80 |
| Libertarian | Feena Bonoan | 4,915 | 1.20% | −0.43 |
| Green | Emma Jane Pohlman | 4,142 | 1.01% | N/A |
| Aloha ʻĀina | Dan Decker | 2,208 | 0.54% | N/A |
| Total votes | | 408,517 | 100.0% | |
| Democratic hold | | | | |

== Idaho ==
Idaho election
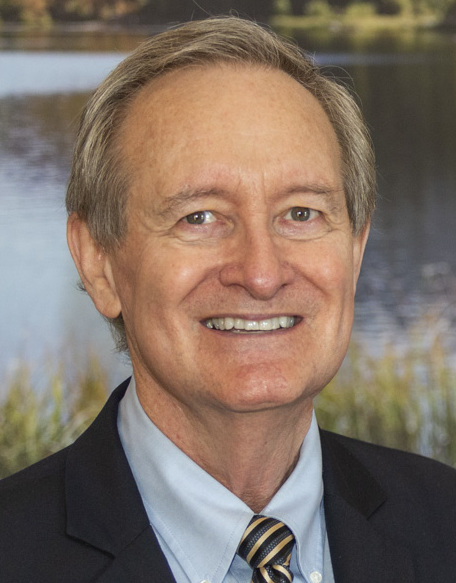

| Nominee | Mike Crapo | David Roth | Scott Cleveland |
| Party | Republican | Democratic | Independent |
| Popular vote | 358,539 | 169,808 | 49,917 |
| Percentage | 60.7% | 28.7% | 8.5% |
- County results Crapo: 40–50% 50–60% 60–70% 70–80% 80–90% Roth: 50–60% 60–70%
U.S. senator before election
Mike Crapo
Republican
Elected U.S. Senator
Mike Crapo
Republican

Four-term Republican Mike Crapo was re-elected in 2016 with 66.1% of the vote. He ran for re-election to a fifth term. Democrat David Roth faced Crapo in the general election after defeating Ben Pursley in the primary.

Idaho Republican primary
| Party | Candidate | Votes | % |
|---|---|---|---|
| Republican | Mike Crapo (incumbent) | 177,906 | 67.13 |
| Republican | Scott Trotter | 27,699 | 10.45 |
| Republican | Brenda Bourn | 21,612 | 8.16 |
| Republican | Ramont Turnbull | 20,883 | 7.88 |
| Republican | Natalie Fleming | 16,902 | 6.38 |
| Total votes | | 265,002 | 100.00 |

Idaho Democratic primary
| Party | Candidate | Votes | % |
|---|---|---|---|
| Democratic | David Roth | 19,160 | 57.80 |
| Democratic | Ben Pursley | 13,987 | 42.20 |
| Total votes | | 33,147 | 100.00 |

Idaho general election
| Party | Candidate | Votes | % | ±% |
|---|---|---|---|---|
| Republican | Mike Crapo (incumbent) | 358,539 | 60.68% | −5.45 |
| Democratic | David Roth | 169,808 | 28.74% | +1.01 |
| Independent | Scott Cleveland | 49,917 | 8.45% | N/A |
| Constitution | Ray Writz | 8,500 | 1.44% | −4.70 |
| Libertarian | Idaho Sierra Law | 4,126 | 0.70% | N/A |
| Total votes | | 590,890 | 100.0% | |
| Republican hold | | | | |

== Illinois ==
Illinois election
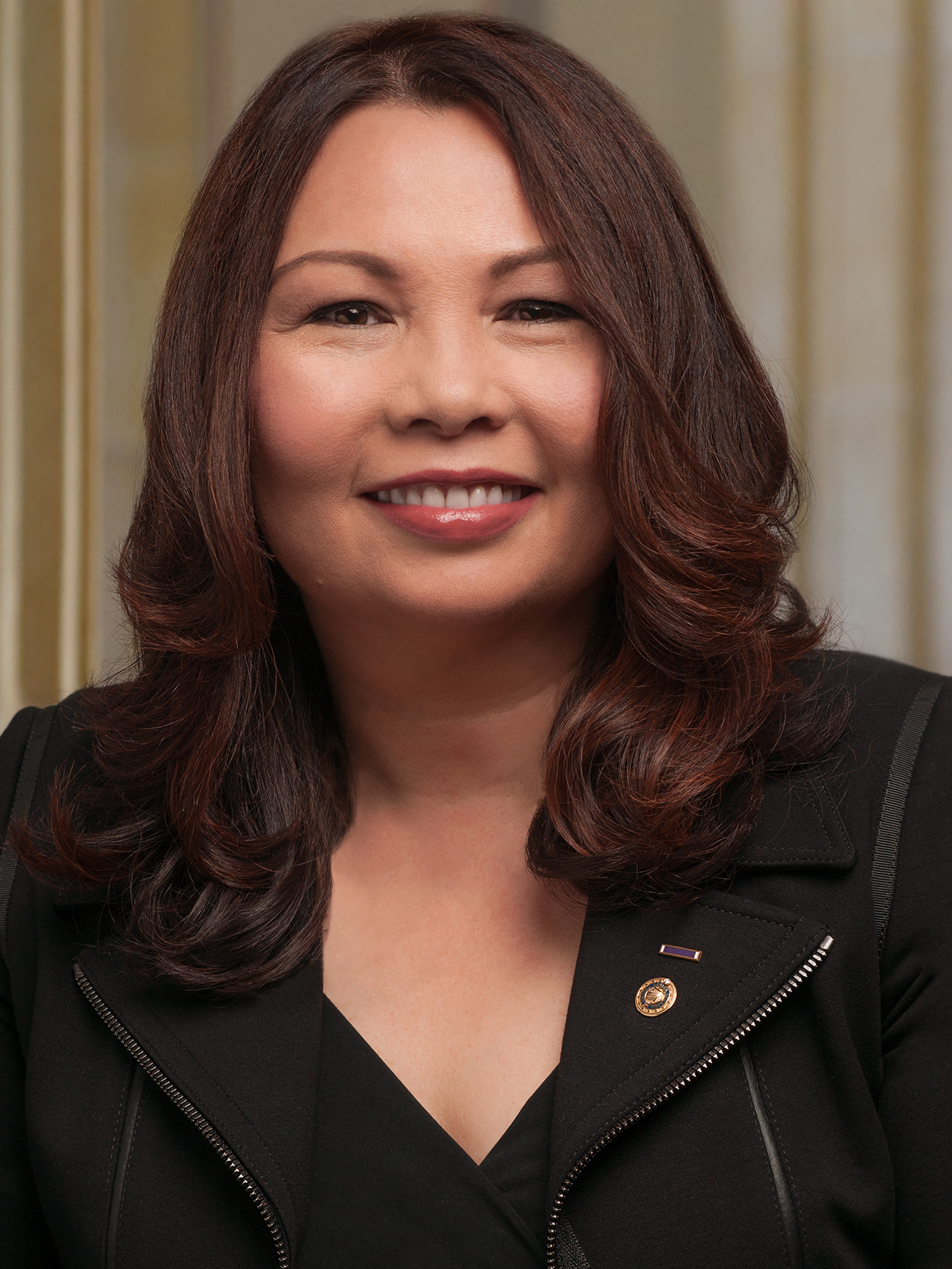

| Nominee | Tammy Duckworth | Kathy Salvi |
| Party | Democratic | Republican |
| Popular vote | 2,329,136 | 1,701,055 |
| Percentage | 56.8% | 41.5% |
- County results Duckworth: 40–50% 50–60% 60–70% 70–80% Salvi: 40–50% 50–60% 60–70% 70–80% 80–90%
U.S. senator before election
Tammy Duckworth
Democratic
Elected U.S. senator
Tammy Duckworth
Democratic

One-term Democrat Tammy Duckworth was elected in 2016 with 54.9% of the vote. She defeated Republican attorney Kathy Salvi in the general election.

Illinois Democratic primary
| Party | Candidate | Votes | % |
|---|---|---|---|
| Democratic | Tammy Duckworth (incumbent) | 856,720 | 100.00 |
| Total votes | | 856,720 | 100.00 |

Illinois Republican primary
| Party | Candidate | Votes | % |
|---|---|---|---|
| Republican | Kathy Salvi | 216,007 | 30.23 |
| Republican | Peggy Hubbard | 177,180 | 24.79 |
| Republican | Matt Dubiel | 90,538 | 12.67 |
| Republican | Casey Chlebek | 76,213 | 10.66 |
| Republican | Bobby Piton | 65,461 | 9.16 |
| Republican | Anthony W. Williams | 52,890 | 7.40 |
| Republican | Jimmy Lee Tillman II | 36,342 | 5.09 |
| Total votes | | 714,631 | 100.00 |

Illinois general election
| Party | Candidate | Votes | % | ±% |
|---|---|---|---|---|
| Democratic | Tammy Duckworth (incumbent) | 2,329,136 | 56.82% | +1.96 |
| Republican | Kathy Salvi | 1,701,055 | 41.50% | +1.72 |
| Libertarian | Bill Redpath | 68,671 | 1.68% | −1.53 |
| Write-in | | 34 | 0.00% | −0.01 |
| Total votes | | 4,098,896 | 100.0% | |
| Democratic hold | | | | |

== Indiana ==
Indiana election
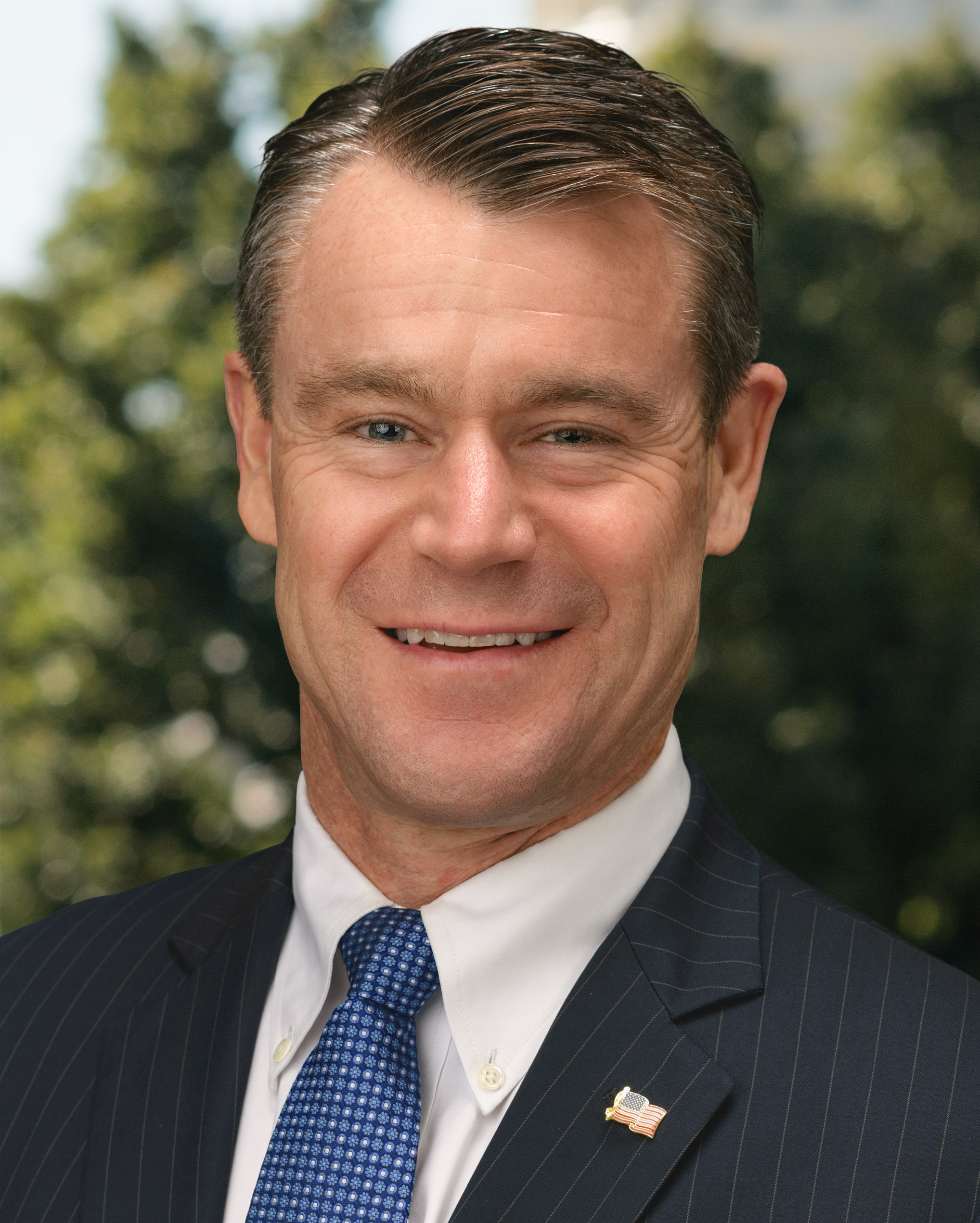

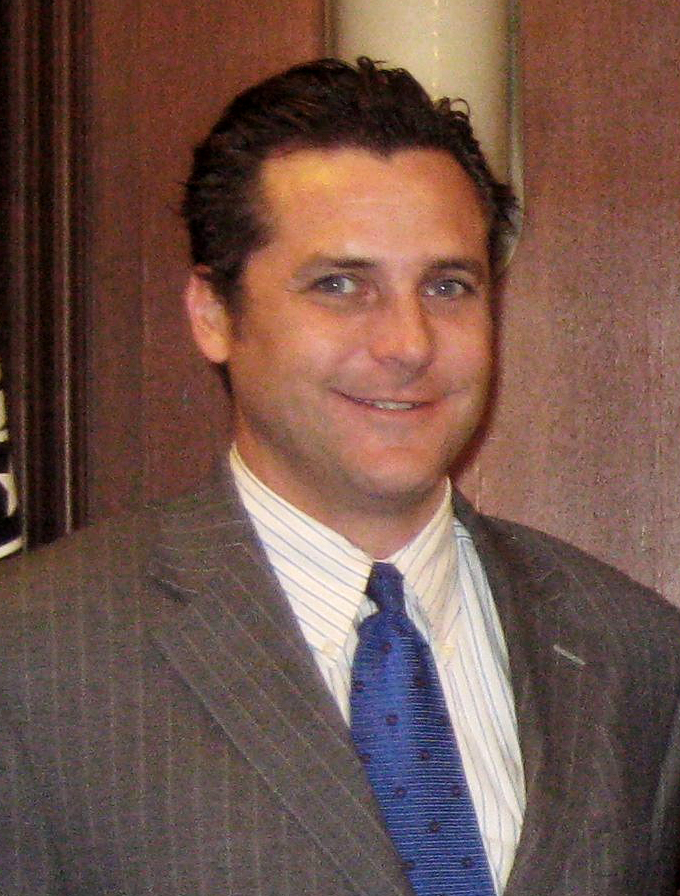
| Nominee | Todd Young | Thomas McDermott Jr. |
| Party | Republican | Democratic |
| Popular vote | 1,090,165 | 704,411 |
| Percentage | 58.6% | 37.9% |
- County results Young: 50–60% 60–70% 70–80% 80–90% McDermott: 50–60% 60–70%
U.S. senator before election
Todd Young
Republican
Elected U.S. senator
Todd Young
Republican

First-term Republican Todd Young was elected in 2016 with 52.1% of the vote. He announced on March 2, 2021, that he was running for re-election. Hammond mayor Thomas McDermott Jr. won the Democratic nomination. James Sceniak, a behavior therapist, was the Libertarian candidate.

Young defeated McDermott, winning re-election to a second term.

Indiana Republican primary
| Party | Candidate | Votes | % |
|---|---|---|---|
| Republican | Todd Young (incumbent) | 372,738 | 100.00 |
| Total votes | | 372,738 | 100.00 |

Indiana Democratic primary
| Party | Candidate | Votes | % |
|---|---|---|---|
| Democratic | Thomas McDermott Jr. | 173,466 | 100.00 |
| Total votes | | 173,466 | 100.00 |

Indiana general election
| Party | Candidate | Votes | % | ±% |
|---|---|---|---|---|
| Republican | Todd Young (incumbent) | 1,090,165 | 58.62% | +6.51 |
| Democratic | Thomas McDermott Jr. | 704,411 | 37.87% | −4.54 |
| Libertarian | James Sceniak | 63,814 | 3.43% | −2.04 |
| Write-in | | 1,461 | 0.08% | +0.07 |
| Total votes | | 1,859,851 | 100.0% | |
| Republican hold | | | | |

== Iowa ==
Iowa election
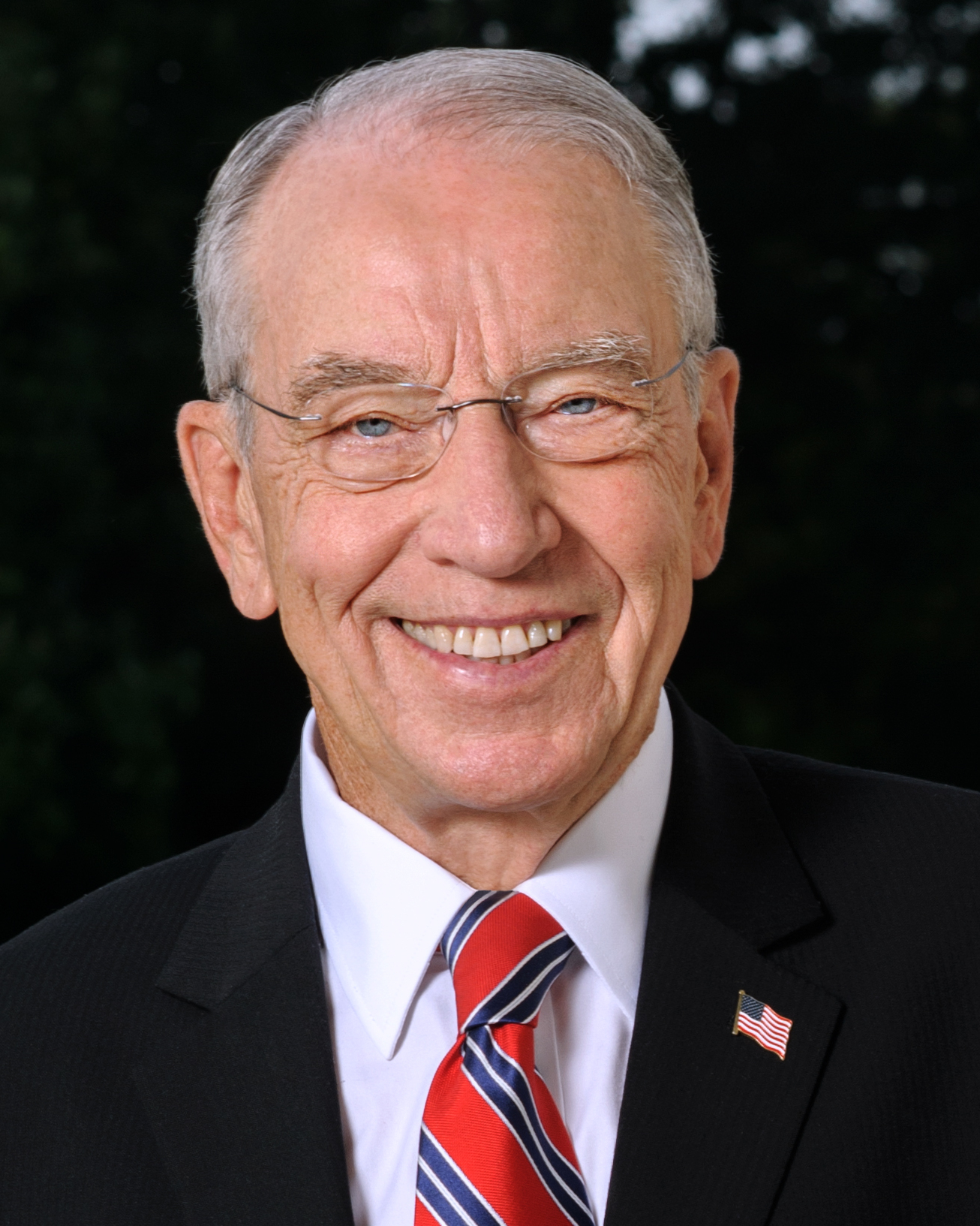

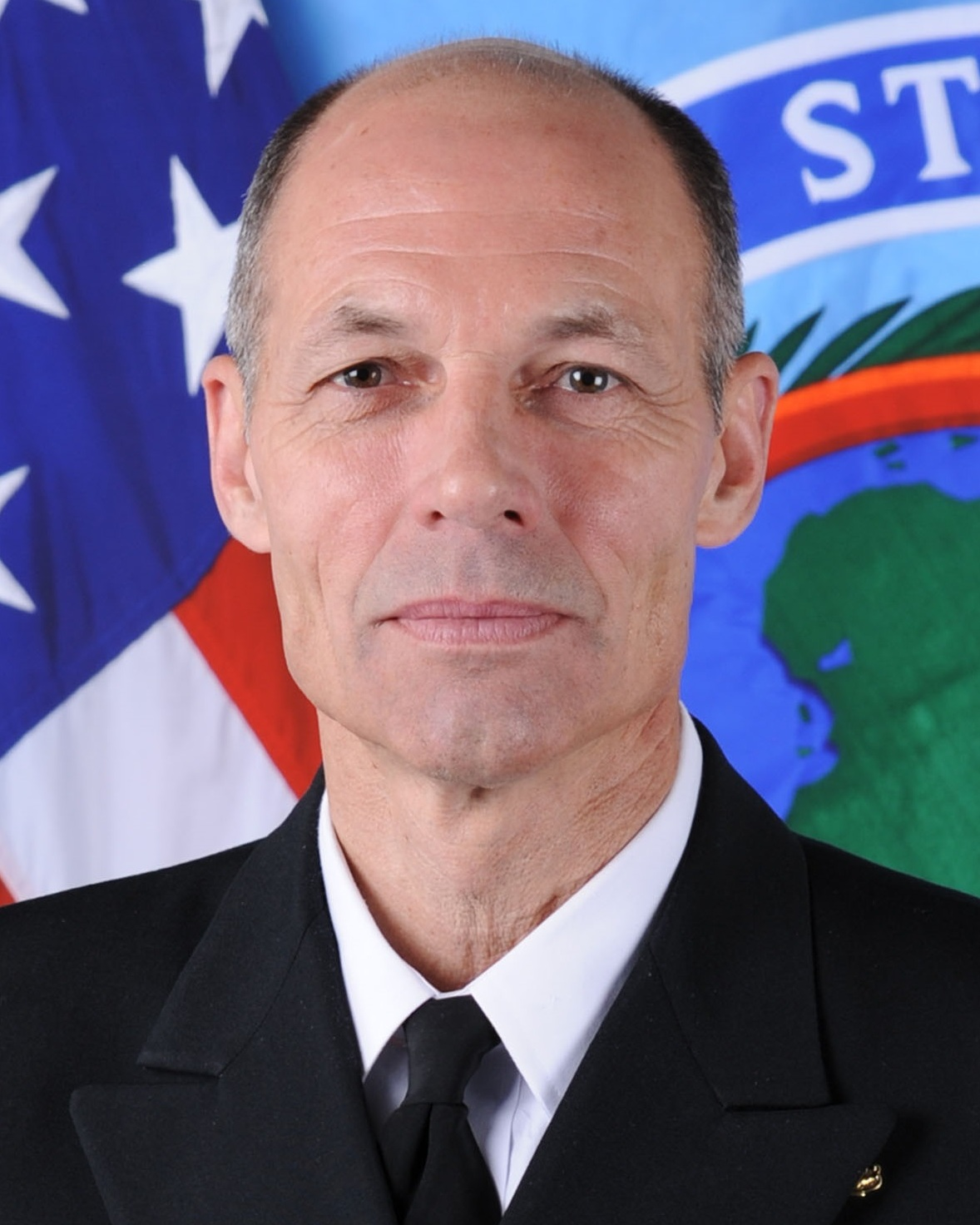
| Nominee | Chuck Grassley | Michael Franken |
| Party | Republican | Democratic |
| Popular vote | 681,501 | 533,330 |
| Percentage | 56.0% | 43.8% |
- County results Grassley: 50–60% 60–70% 70–80% 80–90% Franken: 50–60% 70–80%
U.S. senator before election
Chuck Grassley
Republican
Elected U.S. Senator
Chuck Grassley
Republican

Seven-term Republican Chuck Grassley was re-elected in 2016 with 60.1% of the vote. He sought re-election to an eighth term.

In the Republican primary, Grassley defeated state senator Jim Carlin.

Retired admiral and former aide to U.S. senator Ted Kennedy, Michael Franken, was the Democratic nominee. Franken defeated former U.S. representative Abby Finkenauer in the primary in what was seen as a major upset.

Grassley defeated Franken, winning re-election to an eighth term.

Iowa Republican primary
| Party | Candidate | Votes | % |
|---|---|---|---|
| Republican | Chuck Grassley (incumbent) | 143,634 | 73.34 |
| Republican | Jim Carlin | 51,891 | 26.50 |
| Write-in | | 312 | 0.16 |
| Total votes | | 195,837 | 100.00 |

Iowa Democratic primary
| Party | Candidate | Votes | % |
|---|---|---|---|
| Democratic | Michael Franken | 86,527 | 55.17 |
| Democratic | Abby Finkenauer | 62,581 | 39.90 |
| Democratic | Glenn Hurst | 7,571 | 4.83 |
| Write-in | | 158 | 0.10 |
| Total votes | | 156,837 | 100.00 |

Iowa general election
| Party | Candidate | Votes | % | ±% |
|---|---|---|---|---|
| Republican | Chuck Grassley (incumbent) | 681,501 | 56.01% | −4.08 |
| Democratic | Michael Franken | 533,330 | 43.84% | +8.18 |
| Write-in | | 1,815 | 0.15% | +0.04 |
| Total votes | | 1,216,646 | 100.0% | |
| Republican hold | | | | |

== Kansas ==
Kansas election
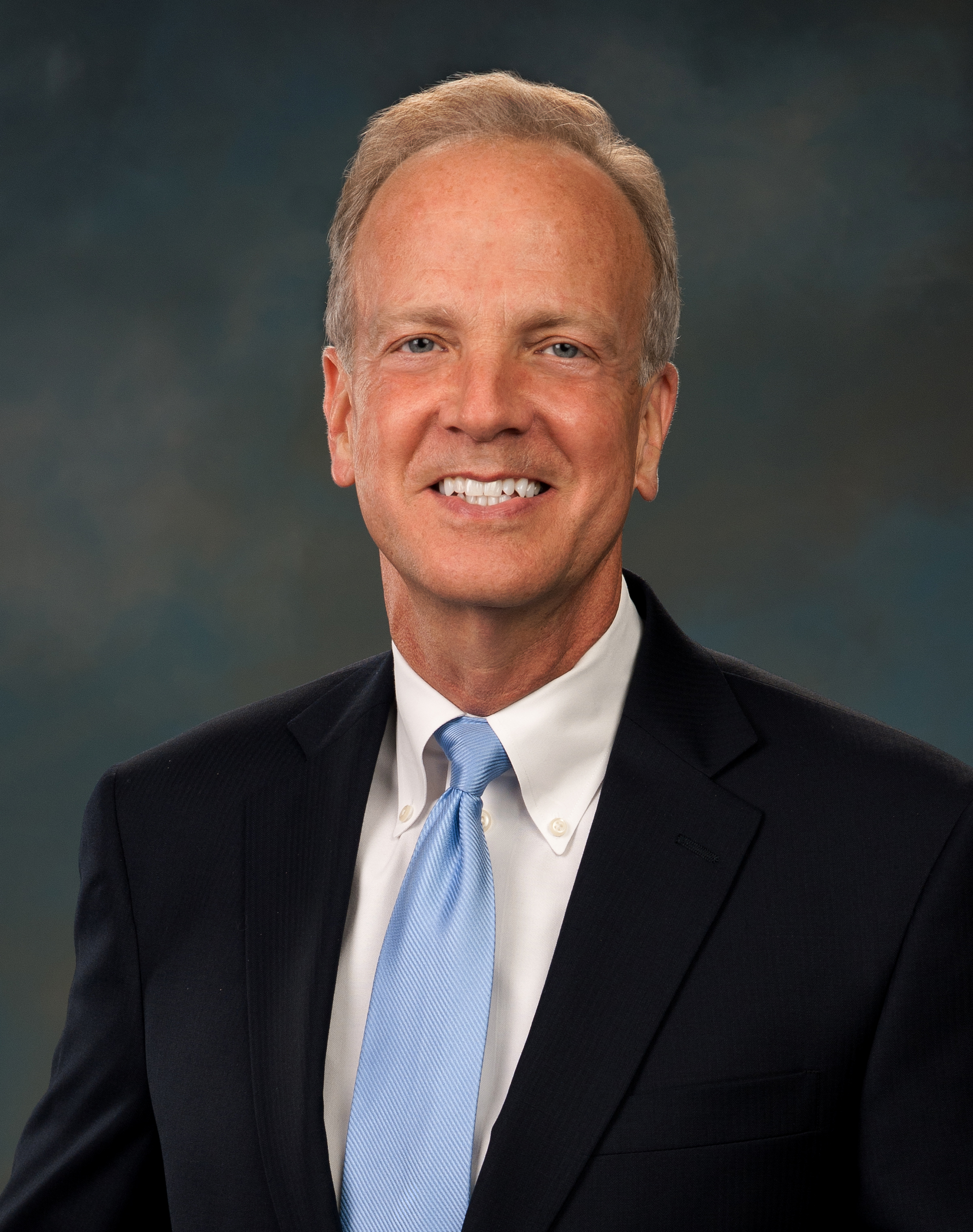

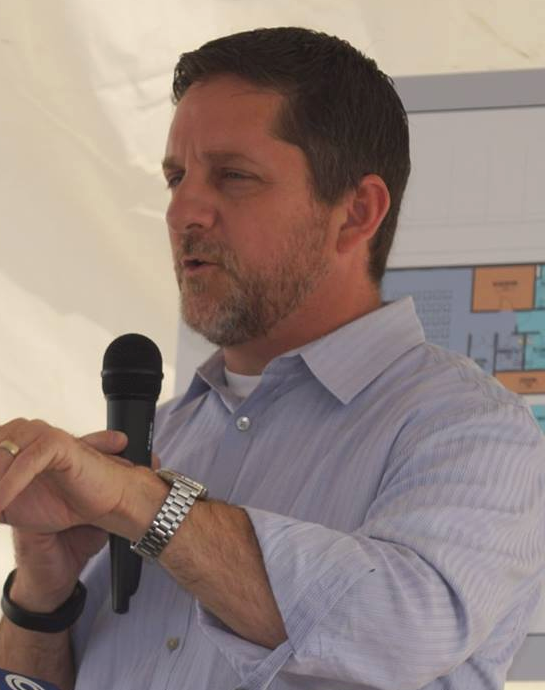
| Nominee | Jerry Moran | Mark Holland |
| Party | Republican | Democratic |
| Popular vote | 602,976 | 372,214 |
| Percentage | 60.0% | 37.0% |
- County results Moran: 50–60% 60–70% 70–80% 80–90% >90% Holland: 40–50% 60–70%
U.S. senator before election
Jerry Moran
Republican
Elected U.S. Senator
Jerry Moran
Republican

Two-term Republican Jerry Moran was re-elected in 2016 with 62.2% of the vote. He announced that he was seeking re-election in 2020. Democratic United Methodist pastor and former Kansas City mayor Mark Holland challenged Moran.

Kansas Republican primary
| Party | Candidate | Votes | % |
|---|---|---|---|
| Republican | Jerry Moran (incumbent) | 383,332 | 80.47 |
| Republican | Joan Farr | 93,016 | 19.53 |
| Total votes | | 476,348 | 100.00 |

Kansas Democratic primary
| Party | Candidate | Votes | % |
|---|---|---|---|
| Democratic | Mark Holland | 101,429 | 38.05 |
| Democratic | Paul Buskirk | 53,750 | 20.16 |
| Democratic | Patrick Wiesner | 47,034 | 17.65 |
| Democratic | Mike Andra | 33,464 | 12.55 |
| Democratic | Robert Klingenberg | 21,413 | 8.03 |
| Democratic | Michael Soetaert | 9,464 | 3.55 |
| Total votes | | 266,554 | 100.00 |

Kansas general election
| Party | Candidate | Votes | % | ±% |
|---|---|---|---|---|
| Republican | Jerry Moran (incumbent) | 602,976 | 60.00% | −2.18 |
| Democratic | Mark Holland | 372,214 | 37.04% | +4.80 |
| Libertarian | David Graham | 29,766 | 2.96% | −2.62 |
| Total votes | | 1,004,956 | 100.0% | |
| Republican hold | | | | |

== Kentucky ==
Kentucky election
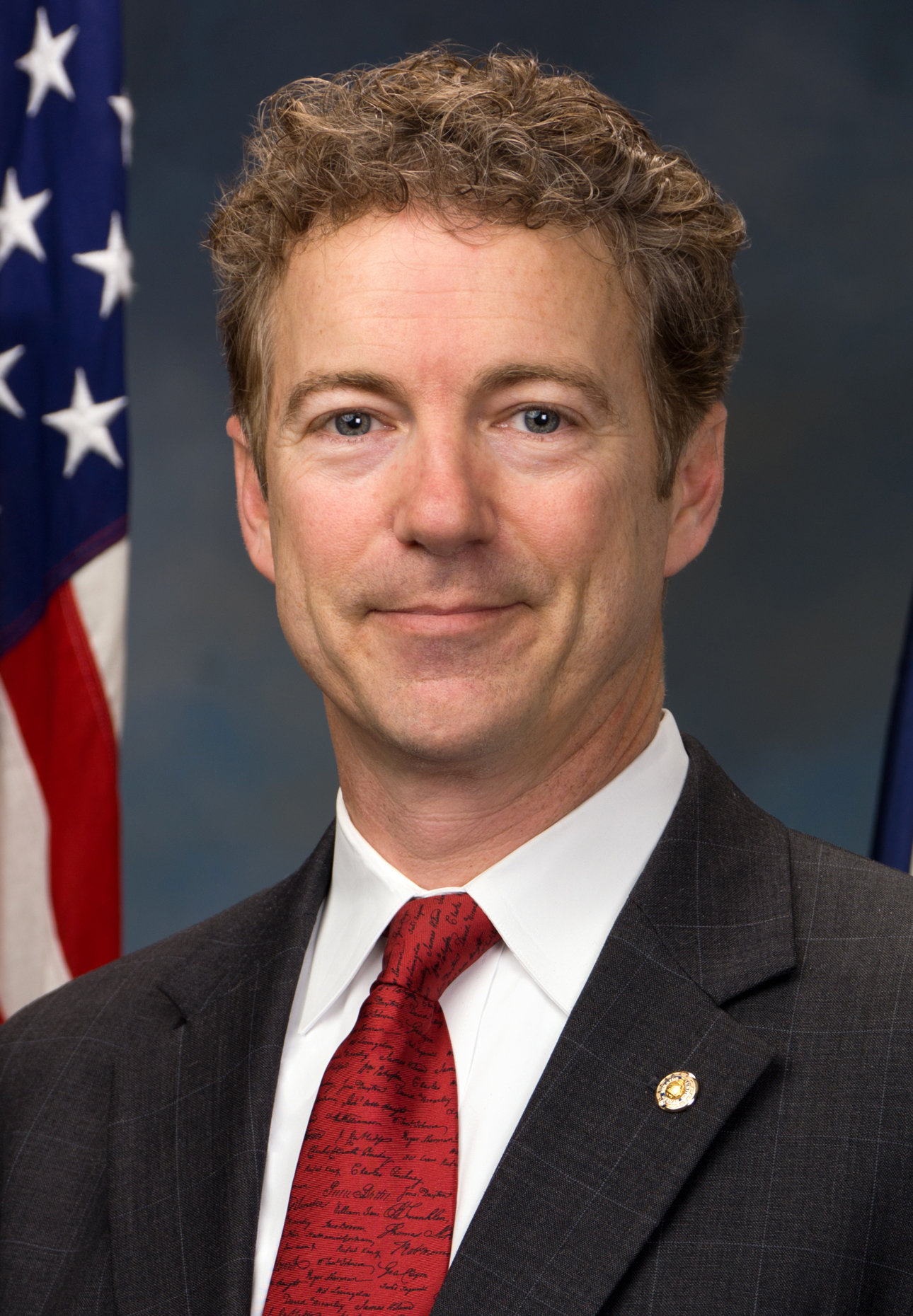

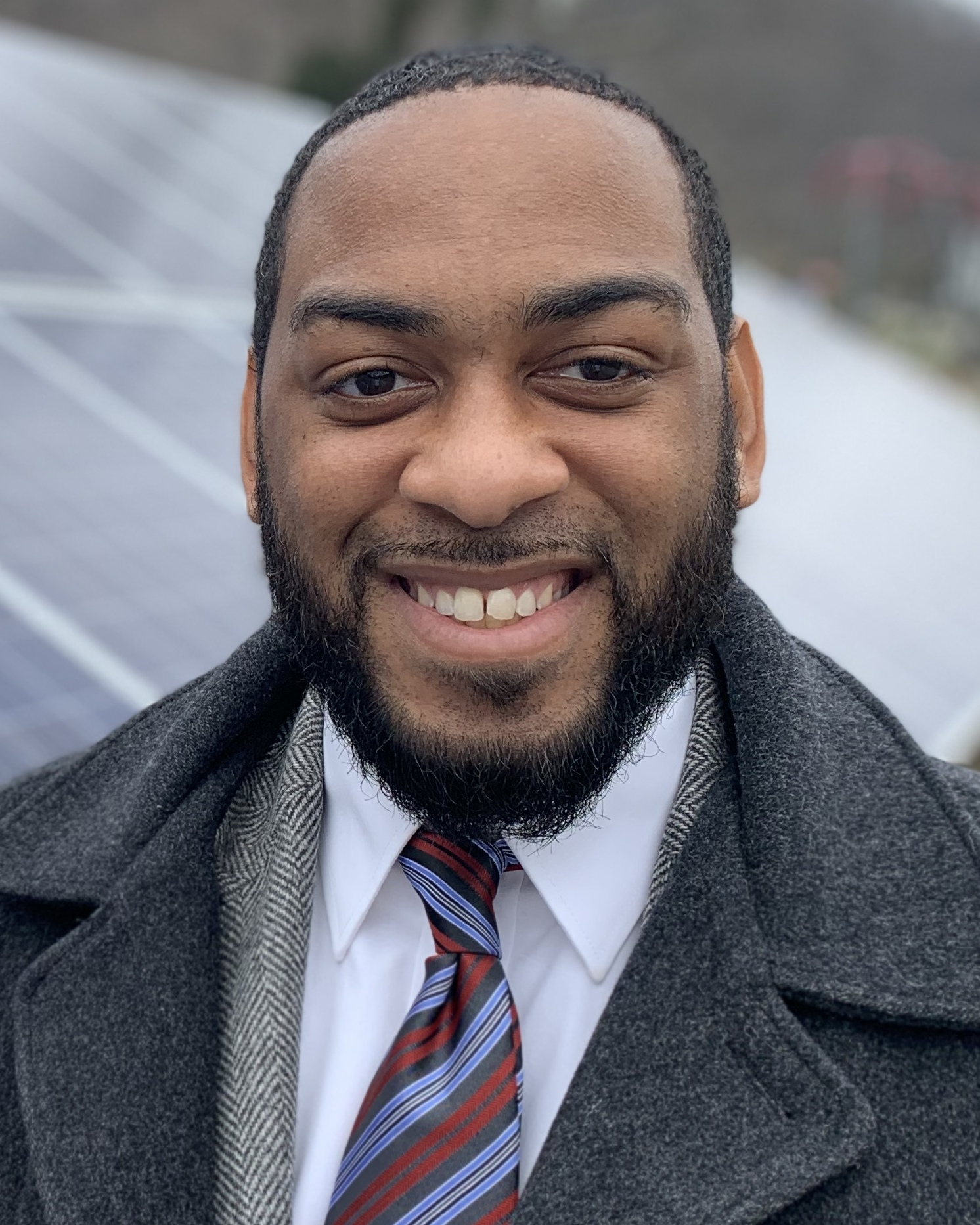
| Nominee | Rand Paul | Charles Booker |
| Party | Republican | Democratic |
| Popular vote | 913,326 | 564,311 |
| Percentage | 61.8% | 38.2% |
- County results Paul: 50–60% 60–70% 70–80% 80–90% Booker: 50–60% 60–70%
U.S. senator before election
Rand Paul
Republican
Elected U.S. Senator
Rand Paul
Republican

Two-term Republican Rand Paul was re-elected in 2016 with 57.3% of the vote. He sought re-election to a third term.

Former Democratic state representative and 2020 runner-up in the Democratic U.S. Senate primary Charles Booker won the Democratic primary.

Kentucky Republican primary
| Party | Candidate | Votes | % |
|---|---|---|---|
| Republican | Rand Paul (incumbent) | 333,051 | 86.35 |
| Republican | Valerie Frederick | 14,018 | 3.63 |
| Republican | Paul V. Hamilton | 13,473 | 3.49 |
| Republican | Arnold Blankenship | 10,092 | 2.62 |
| Republican | Tami Stanfield | 9,526 | 2.47 |
| Republican | John Schiess | 5,538 | 1.44 |
| Total votes | | 385,698 | 100.00 |

Kentucky Democratic primary
| Party | Candidate | Votes | % |
|---|---|---|---|
| Democratic | Charles Booker | 214,245 | 73.29 |
| Democratic | Joshua Blanton Sr. | 30,980 | 10.60 |
| Democratic | John Merrill | 28,931 | 9.90 |
| Democratic | Ruth Gao | 18,154 | 6.21 |
| Total votes | | 292,310 | 100.00 |

Kentucky general election
| Party | Candidate | Votes | % | ±% |
|---|---|---|---|---|
| Republican | Rand Paul (incumbent) | 913,326 | 61.80% | +4.53 |
| Democratic | Charles Booker | 564,311 | 38.19% | −4.54 |
| Write-in | | 193 | 0.01% | +0.01 |
| Total votes | | 1,477,830 | 100.0% | |
| Republican hold | | | | |

== Louisiana ==
Louisiana election
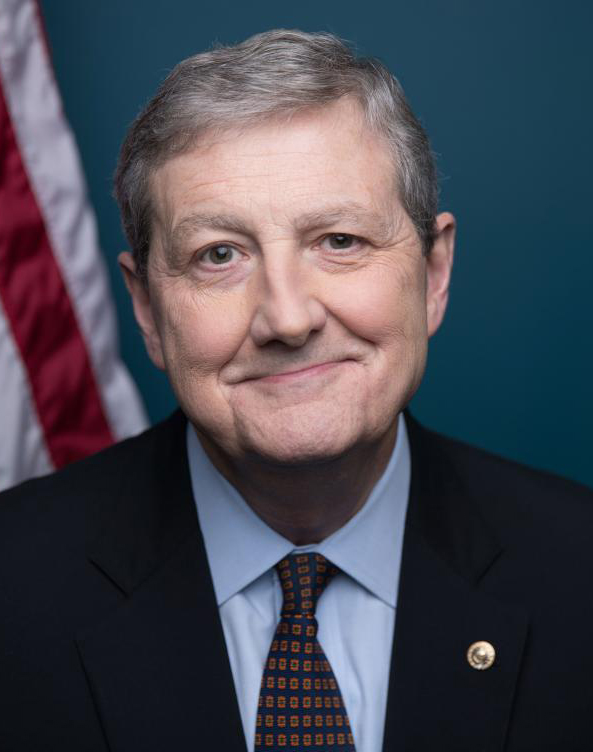

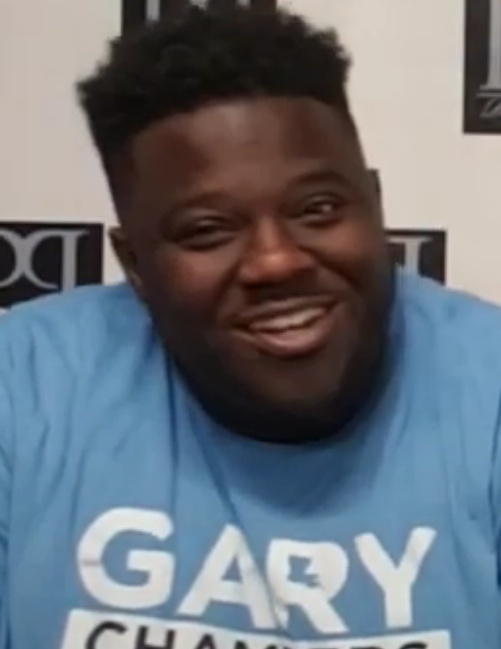

| Candidate | John Kennedy | Gary Chambers | Luke Mixon |
| Party | Republican | Democratic | Democratic |
| Popular vote | 851,568 | 246,933 | 182,877 |
| Percentage | 61.6% | 17.9% | 13.2% |
- Parish results Kennedy: 30–40% 40–50% 50–60% 60–70% 70–80% 80–90% 90–100% Chambers: 40–50%
U.S. senator before election
John Kennedy
Republican
Elected U.S. Senator
John Kennedy
Republican

One-term Republican John Kennedy was elected in 2016 with 60.6% of the vote and ran for a second term. Civil rights activist Gary Chambers and U.S. Navy veteran Luke Mixon ran as Democrats.

Louisiana general election
| Party | Candidate | Votes | % |
|---|---|---|---|
| Republican | John Kennedy (incumbent) | 851,568 | 61.56 |
| Democratic | Gary Chambers | 246,933 | 17.85 |
| Democratic | Luke Mixon | 182,887 | 13.22 |
| Democratic | Syrita Steib | 31,568 | 2.28 |
| Republican | Devin Lance Graham | 25,275 | 1.83 |
| Democratic | Vinny Mendoza | 11,910 | 0.86 |
| Independent | Beryl Billiot | 9,378 | 0.68 |
| Democratic | Salvador P. Rodriguez | 7,767 | 0.56 |
| Independent | Bradley McMorris | 5,388 | 0.39 |
| Libertarian | Aaron C. Sigler | 4,865 | 0.35 |
| Independent | Xan John | 2,753 | 0.20 |
| Independent | W. Thomas La Fontaine Olson | 1,676 | 0.12 |
| Independent | Thomas Wenn | 1,322 | 0.10 |
| Total votes | | 1,383,290 | 100.00 |
| Republican hold | | | |

== Maryland ==
Maryland election
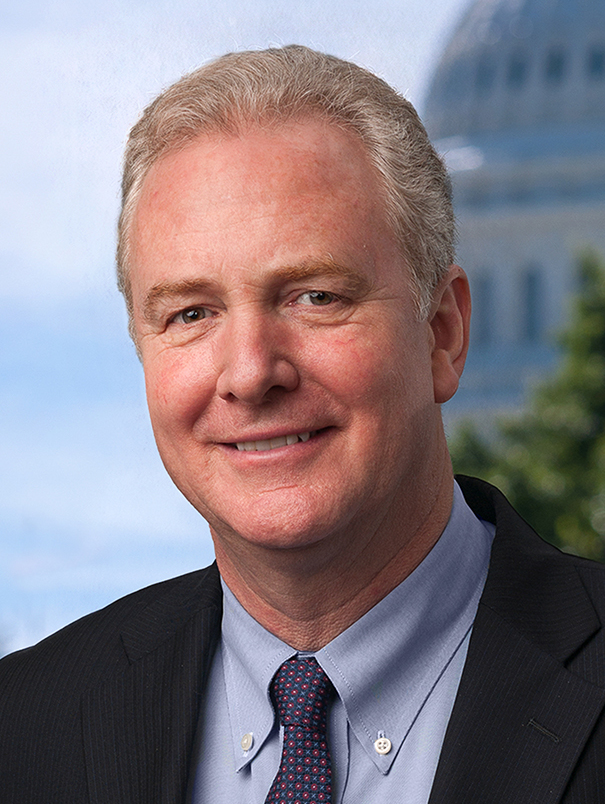

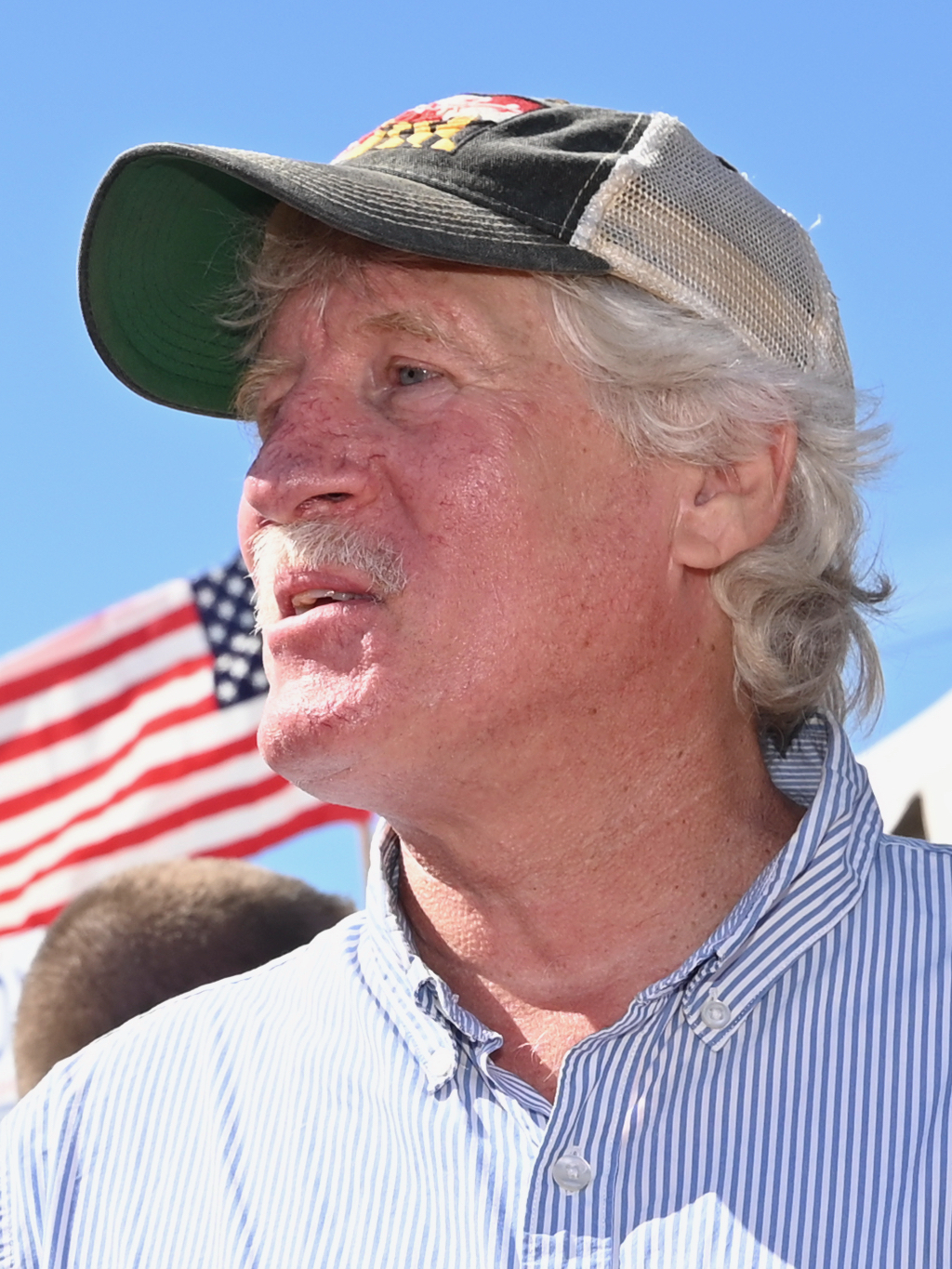
| Nominee | Chris Van Hollen | Chris Chaffee |
| Party | Democratic | Republican |
| Popular vote | 1,316,897 | 682,293 |
| Percentage | 65.8% | 34.1% |
- County results Van Hollen: 60–70% 70–80% 80–90% >90% Chaffee: 50–60% 60–70% 70–80%
U.S. senator before election
Chris Van Hollen
Democratic
Elected U.S. senator
Chris Van Hollen
Democratic

One-term Democrat Chris Van Hollen was elected in 2016 with 60.9% of the vote, and ran for a second term.

Despite previously indicating that he had no interest in pursuing the Republican nomination for the U.S. Senate, incumbent governor Larry Hogan, who was term-limited and scheduled to leave office in 2023, told conservative talk radio host Hugh Hewitt in October 2021 that he was considering challenging Van Hollen. Hogan ultimately decided not to challenge Van Hollen on February 8, 2022.

Van Hollen and construction company owner Chris Chaffee won their respective primaries on July 19.

Maryland Democratic primary
| Party | Candidate | Votes | % |
|---|---|---|---|
| Democratic | Chris Van Hollen (incumbent) | 535,014 | 80.81 |
| Democratic | Michelle Laurence Smith | 127,089 | 19.19 |
| Total votes | | 662,103 | 100.00 |

Maryland Republican primary
| Party | Candidate | Votes | % |
|---|---|---|---|
| Republican | Chris Chaffee | 50,514 | 20.78 |
| Republican | Lorie Friend | 35,714 | 14.69 |
| Republican | John Thormann | 33,290 | 13.69 |
| Republican | Joseph Perez | 26,359 | 10.84 |
| Republican | George Davis | 21,095 | 8.68 |
| Republican | James Tarantin | 20,514 | 8.44 |
| Republican | Reba Hawkins | 18,057 | 7.43 |
| Republican | Jon McGreevey | 14,128 | 5.81 |
| Republican | Todd Puglisi | 13,550 | 5.57 |
| Republican | Nnabu Eze | 9,917 | 4.08 |
| Total votes | | 243,138 | 100.00 |

Maryland general election
| Party | Candidate | Votes | % | ±% |
|---|---|---|---|---|
| Democratic | Chris Van Hollen (incumbent) | 1,316,897 | 65.77% | +4.88 |
| Republican | Chris Chaffee | 682,293 | 34.07% | −1.60 |
| Write-in | | 3,146 | 0.16% | +0.02 |
| Total votes | | 2,002,336 | 100.0% | |
| Democratic hold | | | | |

== Missouri ==
Missouri election
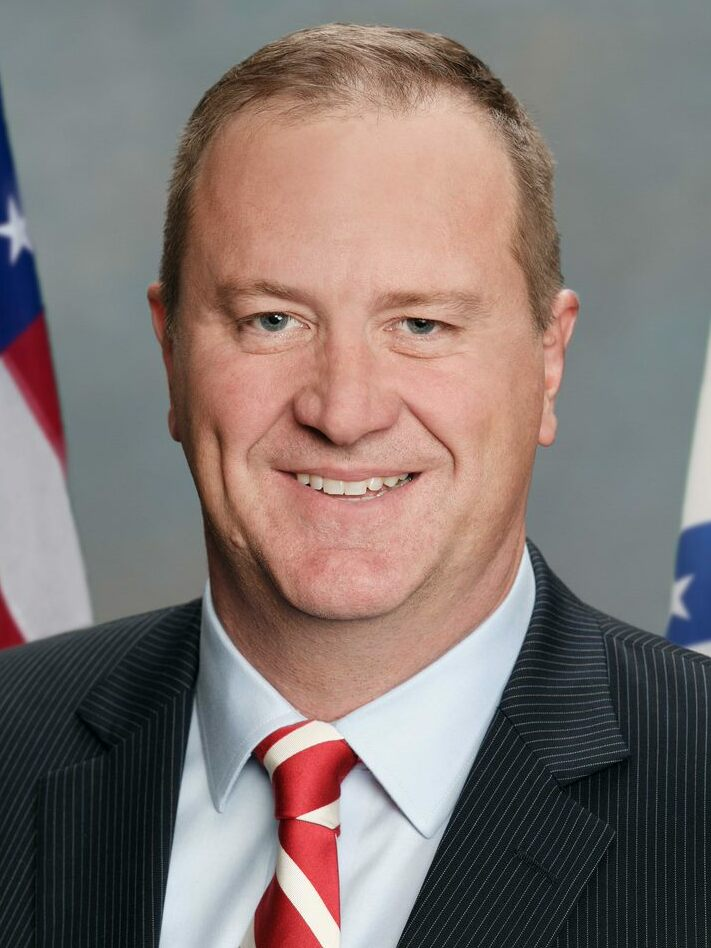

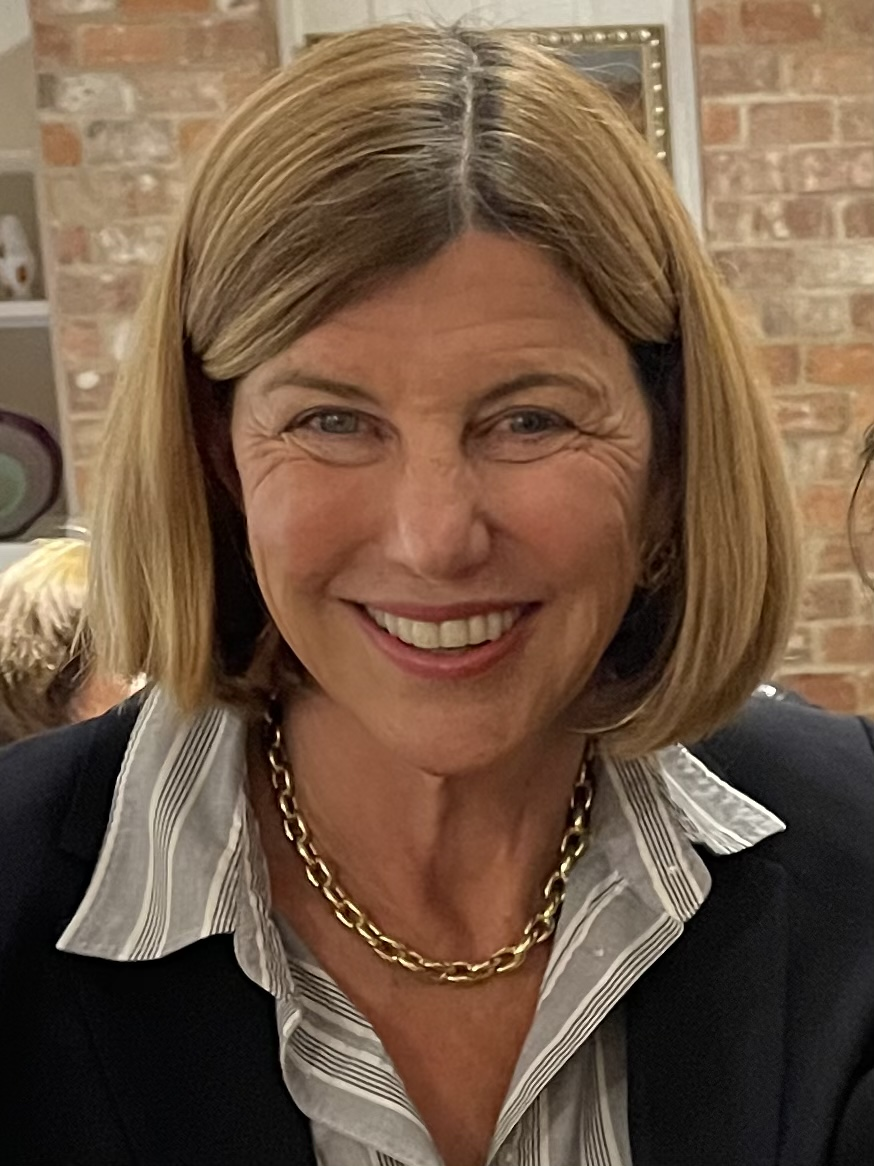
| Nominee | Eric Schmitt | Trudy Busch Valentine |
| Party | Republican | Democratic |
| Popular vote | 1,146,966 | 872,694 |
| Percentage | 55.4% | 42.2% |
- County results Schmitt: 40–50% 50–60% 60–70% 70–80% 80–90% Busch Valentine: 50–60% 60–70% 80–90%
U.S. senator before election
Roy Blunt
Republican
Elected U.S. Senator
Eric Schmitt
Republican

Two-term Republican Roy Blunt was re-elected in 2016 with 49.2% of the vote. He did not seek re-election.

State attorney general Eric Schmitt defeated former governor Eric Greitens and U.S. representatives Vicky Hartzler and Billy Long in the Republican primary.

Anheuser-Busch heiress Trudy Busch Valentine defeated Marine veteran Lucas Kunce in the Democratic primary.

Missouri Republican primary
| Party | Candidate | Votes | % |
|---|---|---|---|
| Republican | Eric Schmitt | 299,382 | 45.66 |
| Republican | Vicky Hartzler | 144,903 | 22.10 |
| Republican | Eric Greitens | 124,155 | 18.94 |
| Republican | Billy Long | 32,603 | 4.97 |
| Republican | Mark McCloskey | 19,540 | 2.98 |
| Republican | Dave Schatz | 7,509 | 1.15 |
| Republican | Patrick A. Lewis | 6,085 | 0.93 |
| Republican | Curtis D. Vaughn | 3,451 | 0.53 |
| Republican | Eric McElroy | 2,805 | 0.43 |
| Republican | Robert Allen | 2,111 | 0.32 |
| Republican | C. W. Gardner | 2,044 | 0.31 |
| Republican | Dave Sims | 1,949 | 0.30 |
| Republican | Bernie Mowinski | 1,602 | 0.24 |
| Republican | Deshon Porter | 1,574 | 0.24 |
| Republican | Darrell Leon McClanahan III | 1,139 | 0.17 |
| Republican | Rickey Joiner | 1,084 | 0.17 |
| Republican | Robert Olson | 1,081 | 0.16 |
| Republican | Dennis Lee Chilton | 755 | 0.12 |
| Republican | Russel P. Breyfogle Jr. | 685 | 0.10 |
| Republican | Kevin C. Schepers | 681 | 0.10 |
| Republican | Hartford Tunnell | 637 | 0.10 |
| Total votes | | 655,675 | 100.00 |

Missouri Democratic primary
| Party | Candidate | Votes | % |
|---|---|---|---|
| Democratic | Trudy Busch Valentine | 158,957 | 43.16 |
| Democratic | Lucas Kunce | 141,203 | 38.34 |
| Democratic | Spencer Toder | 17,465 | 4.74 |
| Democratic | Carla Coffee Wright | 14,438 | 3.92 |
| Democratic | Gena Ross | 8,749 | 2.38 |
| Democratic | Jewel Kelly | 6,464 | 1.76 |
| Democratic | Lewis Rolen | 5,247 | 1.42 |
| Democratic | Pat Kelly | 5,002 | 1.36 |
| Democratic | Ron William Harris | 4,074 | 1.11 |
| Democratic | Josh Shipp | 3,334 | 0.91 |
| Democratic | Clay Taylor | 3,322 | 0.90 |
| Total votes | | 368,255 | 100.00 |

Missouri general election
| Party | Candidate | Votes | % | ±% |
|---|---|---|---|---|
| Republican | Eric Schmitt | 1,146,966 | 55.43% | +6.25 |
| Democratic | Trudy Busch Valentine | 872,694 | 42.18% | −4.21 |
| Libertarian | Jonathan Dine | 34,821 | 1.68% | −0.74 |
| Constitution | Paul Venable | 14,608 | 0.71% | −0.20 |
| Write-in | | 41 | 0.00% | −0.03 |
| Total votes | | 2,069,130 | 100.0% | |
| Republican hold | | | | |

== Nevada ==
Nevada election
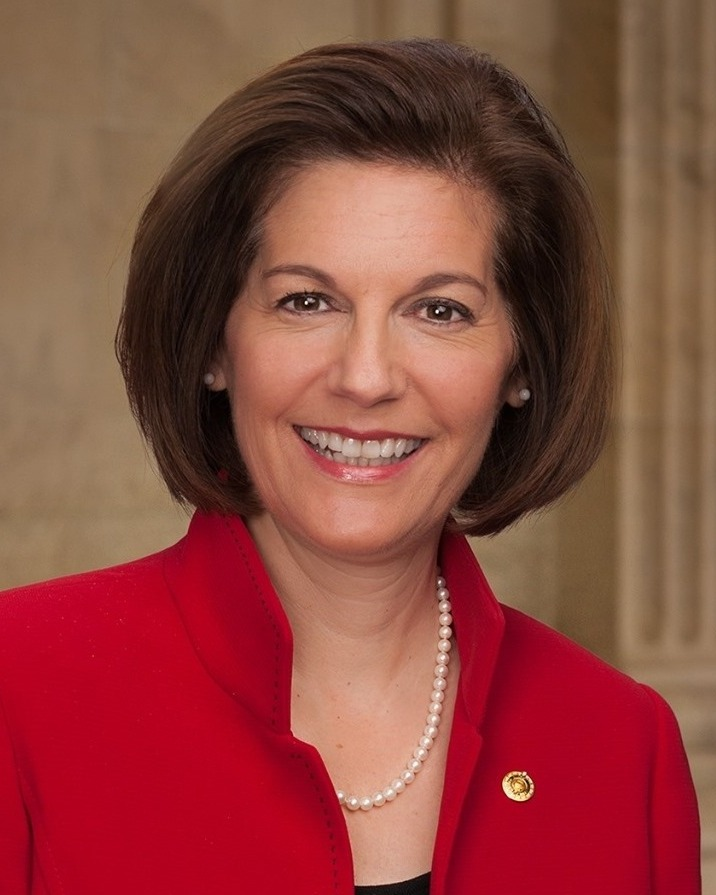

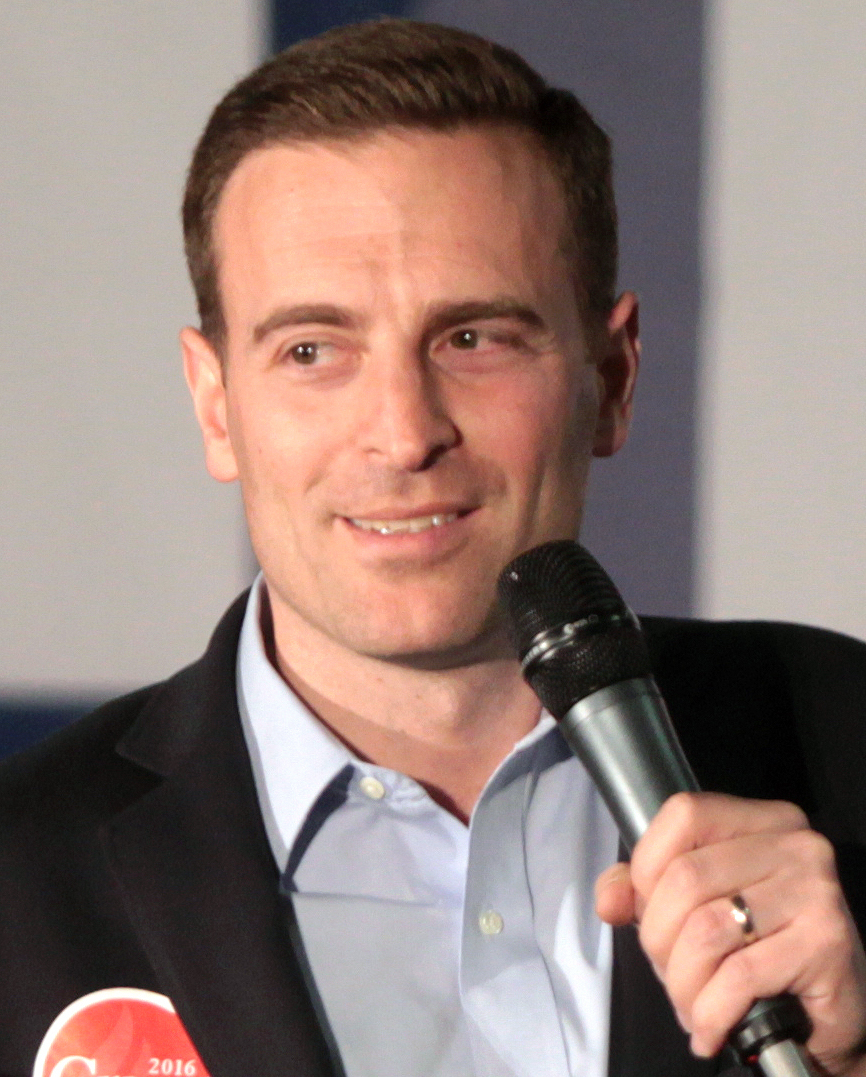
| Nominee | Catherine Cortez Masto | Adam Laxalt |
| Party | Democratic | Republican |
| Popular vote | 498,316 | 490,388 |
| Percentage | 48.8% | 48.0% |
- County results Cortez Masto: 50–60% Laxalt: 50–60% 60–70% 70–80% 80–90%
U.S. senator before election
Catherine Cortez Masto
Democratic
Elected U.S. senator
Catherine Cortez Masto
Democratic

One-term Democrat Catherine Cortez Masto was elected in 2016 with 47.1% of the vote. She ran for re-election.

Former state attorney general Adam Laxalt ran against Cortez Masto for the seat once held by his maternal grandfather Paul Laxalt.

Nevada Democratic primary
| Party | Candidate | Votes | % |
|---|---|---|---|
| Democratic | Catherine Cortez Masto (incumbent) | 159,694 | 90.87 |
| Democratic | Corey Reid | 4,491 | 2.56 |
| None of These Candidates | | 4,216 | 2.40 |
| Democratic | Allen Rheinhart | 3,852 | 2.19 |
| Democratic | Stephanie Kasheta | 3,487 | 1.98 |
| Total votes | | 175,740 | 100.00 |

Nevada Republican primary
| Party | Candidate | Votes | % |
|---|---|---|---|
| Republican | Adam Laxalt | 127,757 | 55.91 |
| Republican | Sam Brown | 78,206 | 34.23 |
| Republican | Sharelle Mendenhall | 6,946 | 3.04 |
| None of These Candidates | | 6,277 | 2.75 |
| Republican | Bill Conrad | 3,440 | 1.51 |
| Republican | Bill Hockstedler | 2,836 | 1.24 |
| Republican | Paul Rodriguez | 1,844 | 0.81 |
| Republican | Tyler Perkins | 850 | 0.37 |
| Republican | Carlo Poliak | 332 | 0.15 |
| Total votes | | 228,488 | 100.00 |

Nevada general election
| Party | Candidate | Votes | % | ±% |
|---|---|---|---|---|
| Democratic | Catherine Cortez Masto (incumbent) | 498,316 | 48.81% | +1.71 |
| Republican | Adam Laxalt | 490,388 | 48.04% | +3.37 |
| None of These Candidates | | 12,441 | 1.22% | −2.59 |
| Independent | Barry Lindemann | 8,075 | 0.79% | N/A |
| Libertarian | Neil Scott | 6,422 | 0.63% | N/A |
| Independent American | Barry Rubinson | 5,208 | 0.51% | −1.04 |
| Total votes | | 1,020,850 | 100.0% | |
| Democratic hold | | | | |

== New Hampshire ==
New Hampshire election
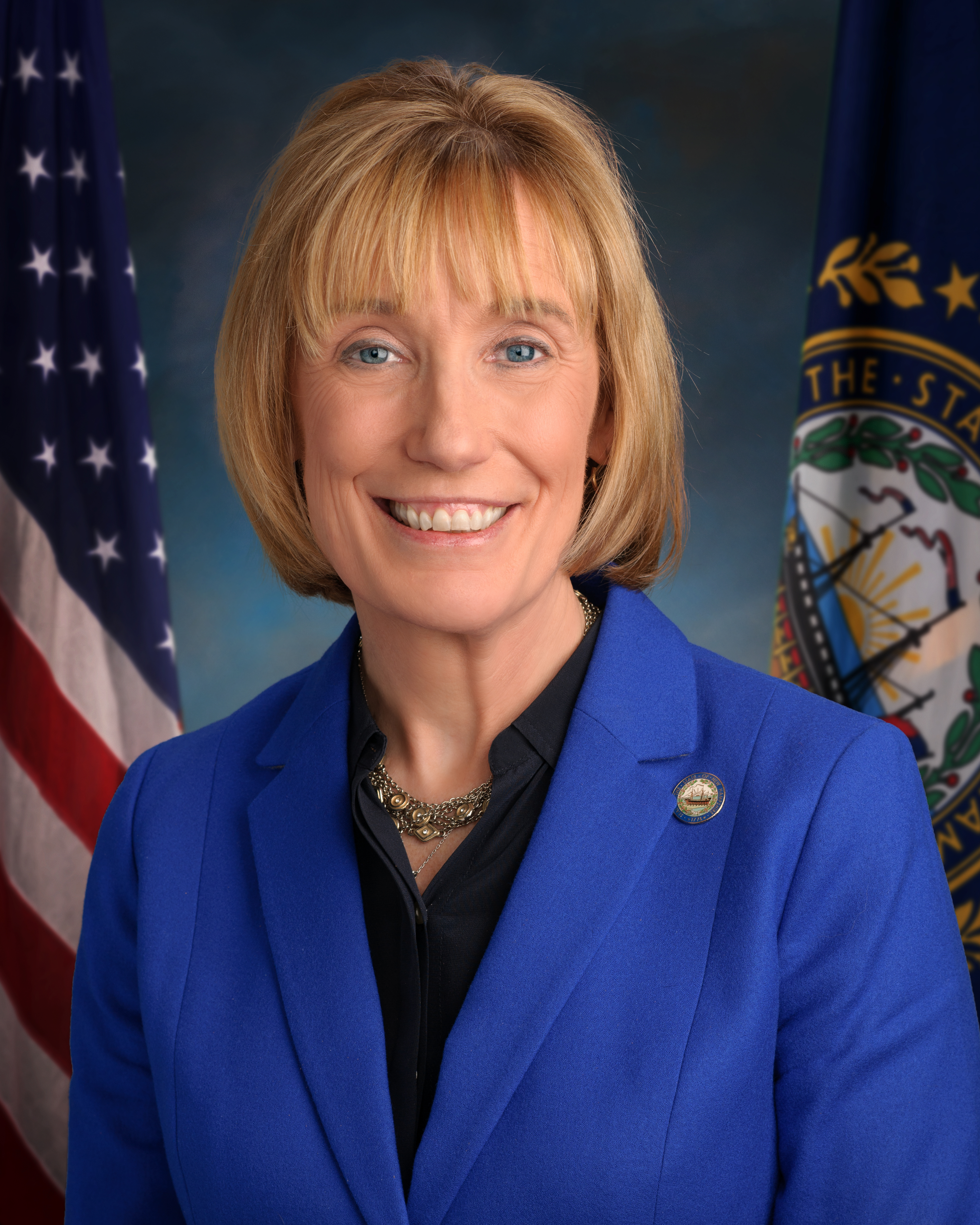

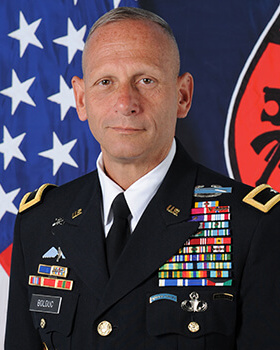
| Nominee | Maggie Hassan | Don Bolduc |
| Party | Democratic | Republican |
| Popular vote | 332,193 | 275,928 |
| Percentage | 53.5% | 44.4% |
- County results Hassan: 50–60% 60–70% Bolduc: 50–60%
U.S. senator before election
Maggie Hassan
Democratic
Elected U.S. senator
Maggie Hassan
Democratic

One-term Democrat Maggie Hassan was elected in 2016 with 48% of the vote. She ran for re-election.

New Hampshire governor Chris Sununu, who was re-elected in 2020 with 65.2% of the vote, declined to run.

U.S. Army brigadier general Don Bolduc narrowly defeated state senator Chuck Morse, former Londonderry town manager Kevin Smith, and others in the Republican primary.

New Hampshire Democratic primary
| Party | Candidate | Votes | % |
|---|---|---|---|
| Democratic | Maggie Hassan (incumbent) | 88,146 | 93.77 |
| Democratic | Paul Krautmann | 3,629 | 3.86 |
| Democratic | John Riggieri | 1,680 | 1.79 |
| Write-in | | 546 | 0.58 |
| Total votes | | 94,001 | 100.00 |

New Hampshire Republican primary
| Party | Candidate | Votes | % |
|---|---|---|---|
| Republican | Don Bolduc | 52,629 | 36.91 |
| Republican | Chuck Morse | 50,929 | 35.71 |
| Republican | Kevin H. Smith | 16,621 | 11.65 |
| Republican | Vikram Mansharamani | 10,690 | 7.50 |
| Republican | Bruce Fenton | 6,381 | 4.47 |
| Republican | John Berman | 961 | 0.67 |
| Republican | Andy Martin | 920 | 0.64 |
| Republican | Tejasinha Sivalingam | 832 | 0.58 |
| Republican | Dennis Lamare | 773 | 0.54 |
| Republican | Edward Laplante | 723 | 0.51 |
| Republican | Gerard Beloin | 521 | 0.36 |
| Write-in | | 623 | 0.44 |
| Total votes | | 142,603 | 100.00 |

New Hampshire general election
| Party | Candidate | Votes | % | ±% |
|---|---|---|---|---|
| Democratic | Maggie Hassan (incumbent) | 332,490 | 53.54% | +5.56 |
| Republican | Don Bolduc | 275,631 | 44.39% | −3.45 |
| Libertarian | Jeremy Kauffman | 12,390 | 2.00% | +0.30 |
| Write-in | | 464 | 0.07% | ±0.00 |
| Total votes | | 620,975 | 100.0% | |
| Democratic hold | | | | |

== New York ==
New York election
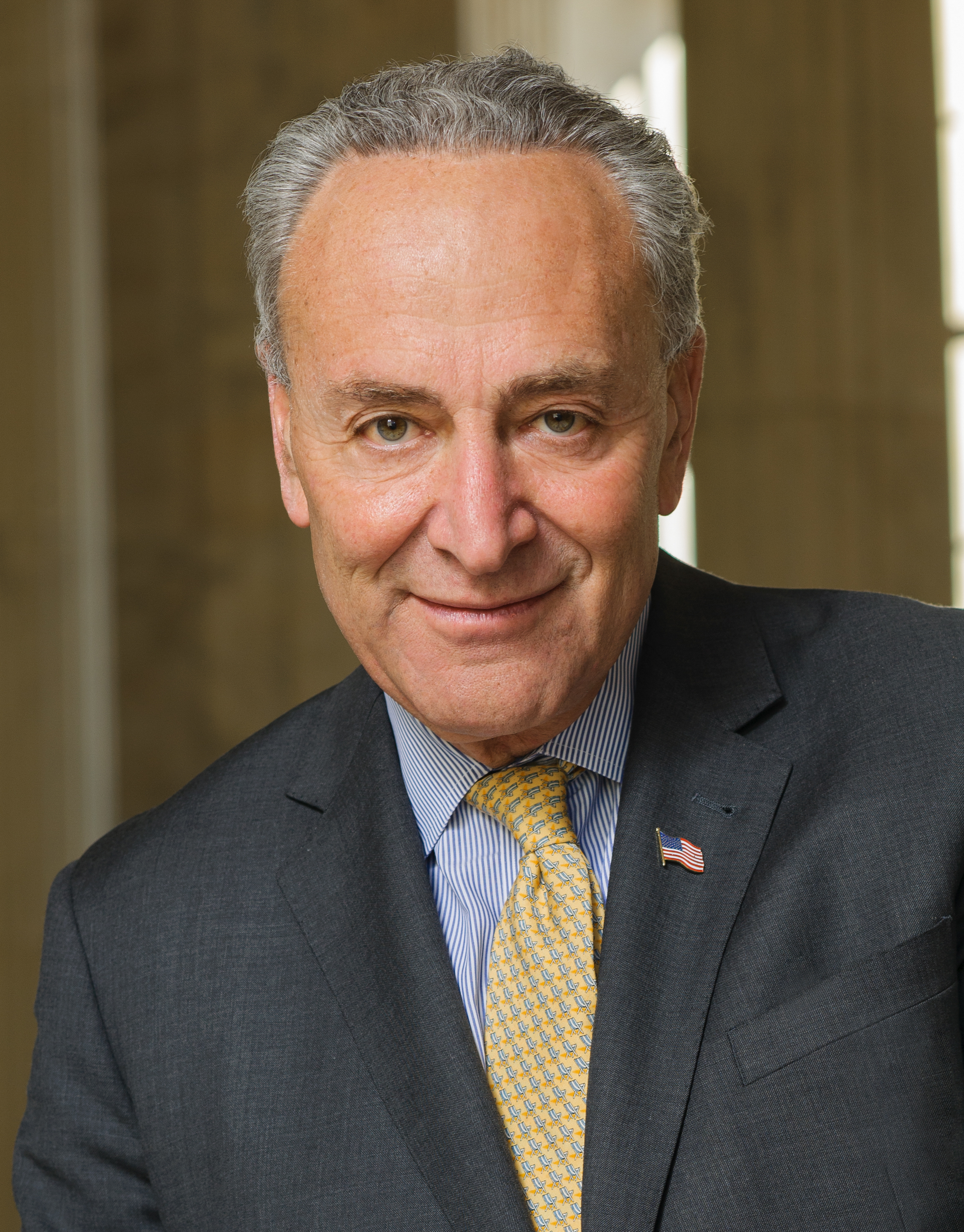

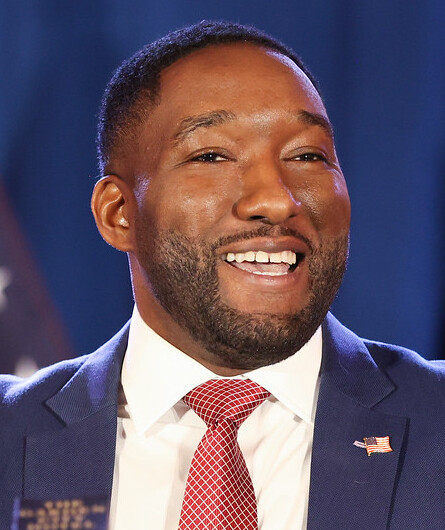
| Nominee | Chuck Schumer | Joe Pinion |
| Party | Democratic | Republican |
| Popular vote | 3,320,561 | 2,501,151 |
| Percentage | 56.8% | 42.8% |
- County results Schumer: 40–50% 50–60% 60–70% 70–80% 80–90% Pinion: 40–50% 50–60% 60–70% 70–80%
U.S. senator before election
Chuck Schumer
Democratic
Elected U.S. senator
Chuck Schumer
Democratic

Incumbent four-term Democratic Party senator Chuck Schumer, who had served as Senate majority leader since 2021 and had held New York's Class 3 Senate seat since defeating Republican Party incumbent Al D'Amato in 1998, ran for a fifth term. Republican Party challenger Joe Pinion was the first black Senate nominee of any major party in New York history. The filing deadline for the June primary was April 7, 2022. Schumer became the longest-serving U.S. senator in the state's history once his fifth term began.

Though Schumer was comfortably re-elected, he lost significant support on Long Island and Upstate New York compared to his last election in 2016. Pinion flipped the more conservative counties that Schumer had won in his previous runs, as well as some Democratic leaning counties such as Nassau, Saratoga, Broome, Clinton, and Essex. However, Schumer's lead was large enough in New York City that it was called by most media outlets the moment the polls closed.

Despite Democrats overperforming expectations on a national level during this cycle, this race was the most competitive in Schumer's Senate career since his first election in 1998, when he won by 10.5%.

New York general election
| Party | Candidate | Votes | % | ±% |
|---|---|---|---|---|
| Democratic | Chuck Schumer | 3,022,822 | 51.69% | −13.03 |
| Working Families | Chuck Schumer | 297,739 | 5.09% | +1.82 |
| Total | Chuck Schumer (incumbent) | 3,320,561 | 56.78% | −13.86 |
| Republican | Joe Pinion | 2,204,499 | 37.69% | +14.37 |
| Conservative | Joe Pinion | 296,652 | 5.07% | +1.45 |
| Total | Joe Pinion | 2,501,151 | 42.76% | +15.58 |
| LaRouche | Diane Sare | 26,844 | 0.46% | N/A |
| Total votes | | 5,848,556 | 100.0% | |
| Democratic hold | | | | |

== North Carolina ==
North Carolina election
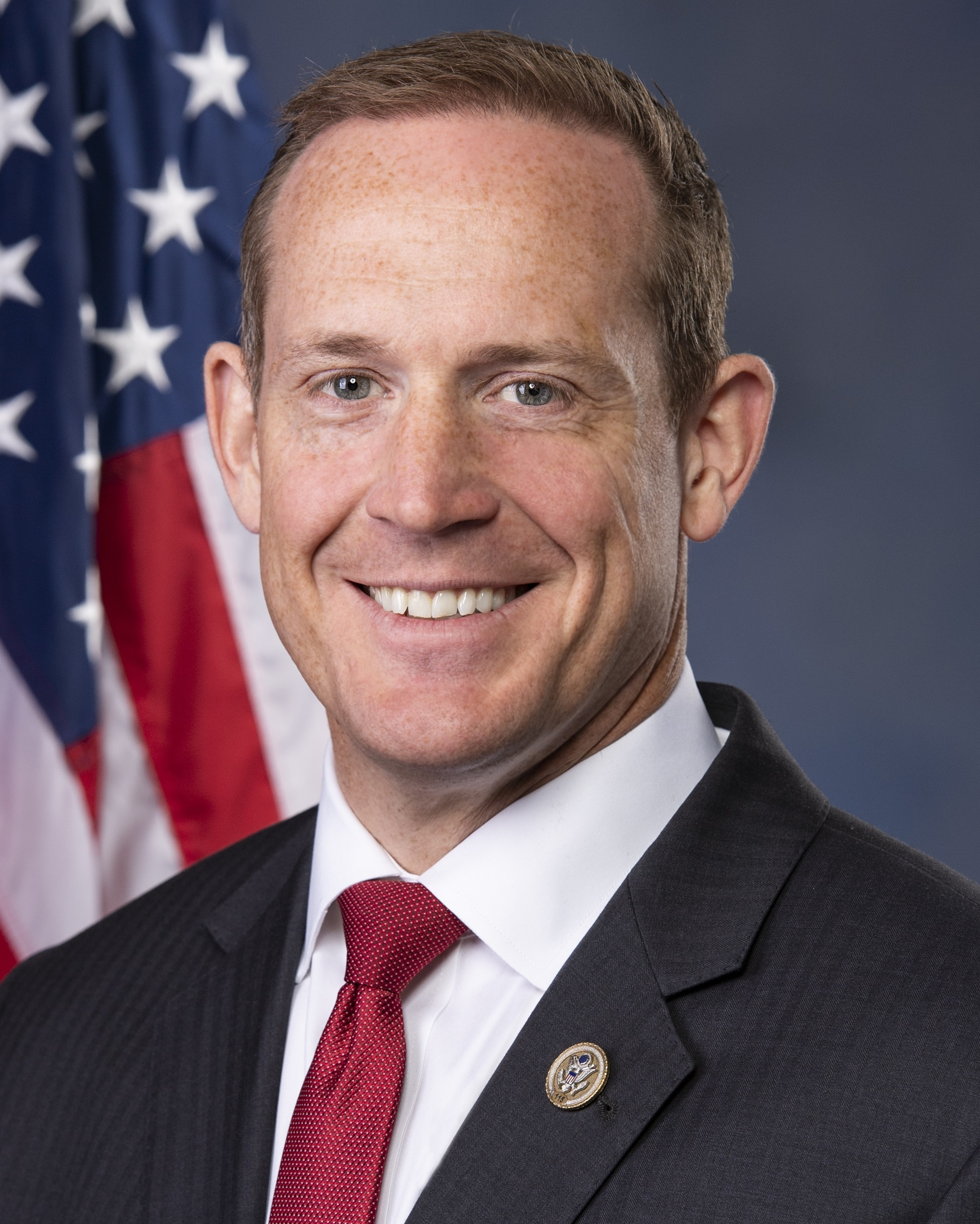

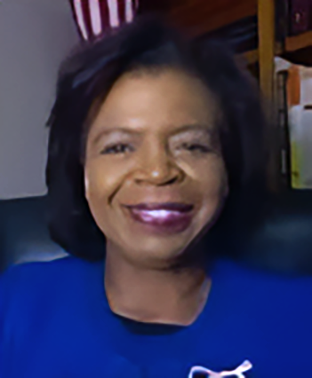
| Nominee | Ted Budd | Cheri Beasley |
| Party | Republican | Democratic |
| Popular vote | 1,905,786 | 1,784,049 |
| Percentage | 50.5% | 47.3% |
- County results Budd: 50–60% 60–70% 70–80% 80–90% Beasley: 40–50% 50–60% 60–70% 70–80% 80–90%
U.S. senator before election
Richard Burr
Republican
Elected U.S. Senator
Ted Budd
Republican

Three-term Republican Richard Burr was re-elected in 2016 with 51.0% of the vote. Burr pledged to retire in 2023.

Veteran and senior fellow at the Center for International Policy, Mathew Hoh ran for senate with the Green Party.

Lara Trump, daughter-in-law of former president Donald Trump, and Lieutenant Governor Mark Robinson briefly considered running for U.S. Senate, but both decided not to run.

U.S. representative Ted Budd, who was endorsed by former president Donald Trump, easily defeated former governor Pat McCrory in the Republican primary.

Former chief justice of the state Supreme Court Cheri Beasley easily defeated Beaufort mayor Rett Newton in the Democratic primary.

North Carolina Republican primary
| Party | Candidate | Votes | % |
|---|---|---|---|
| Republican | Ted Budd | 448,128 | 58.61 |
| Republican | Pat McCrory | 188,135 | 24.60 |
| Republican | Mark Walker | 70,486 | 9.22 |
| Republican | Marjorie K. Eastman | 22,535 | 2.95 |
| Republican | David Flaherty | 7,265 | 0.95 |
| Republican | Kenneth Harper Jr. | 7,129 | 0.93 |
| Republican | Jen Banwart | 3,088 | 0.40 |
| Republican | Charles Kenneth Moss | 2,920 | 0.38 |
| Republican | Leonard Bryant | 2,906 | 0.38 |
| Republican | Benjamin E. Griffiths | 2,870 | 0.38 |
| Republican | Debora Tshiovo | 2,741 | 0.36 |
| Republican | Lee A. Brian | 2,232 | 0.29 |
| Republican | Lichia Sibhatu | 2,191 | 0.29 |
| Republican | Drew Bulecza | 2,022 | 0.26 |
| Total votes | | 764,648 | 100.00 |

North Carolina Democratic primary
| Party | Candidate | Votes | % |
|---|---|---|---|
| Democratic | Cheri Beasley | 501,766 | 81.09 |
| Democratic | James L. Carr Jr. | 21,903 | 3.54 |
| Democratic | Alyssia Rose-Katherine Hammond | 21,005 | 3.39 |
| Democratic | Marcus W. Williams | 17,446 | 2.82 |
| Democratic | Constance Johnson | 12,500 | 2.02 |
| Democratic | Rett Newton | 10,043 | 1.62 |
| Democratic | Chrelle Booker | 9,937 | 1.61 |
| Democratic | B. K. Maginnis | 7,044 | 1.14 |
| Democratic | Robert Colon | 6,904 | 1.12 |
| Democratic | Greg Antoine | 5,179 | 0.84 |
| Democratic | Tobias LaGrone | 5,048 | 0.82 |
| Total votes | | 618,775 | 100.00 |

North Carolina general election
| Party | Candidate | Votes | % | ±% |
|---|---|---|---|---|
| Republican | Ted Budd | 1,905,786 | 50.50% | −0.56 |
| Democratic | Cheri Beasley | 1,784,049 | 47.27% | +1.90 |
| Libertarian | Shannon W. Bray | 51,640 | 1.37% | −2.20 |
| Green | Matthew Hoh | 29,934 | 0.79% | N/A |
| Write-in | | 2,515 | 0.07% | N/A |
| Total votes | | 3,773,924 | 100.0% | |
| Republican hold | | | | |

== North Dakota ==
North Dakota election
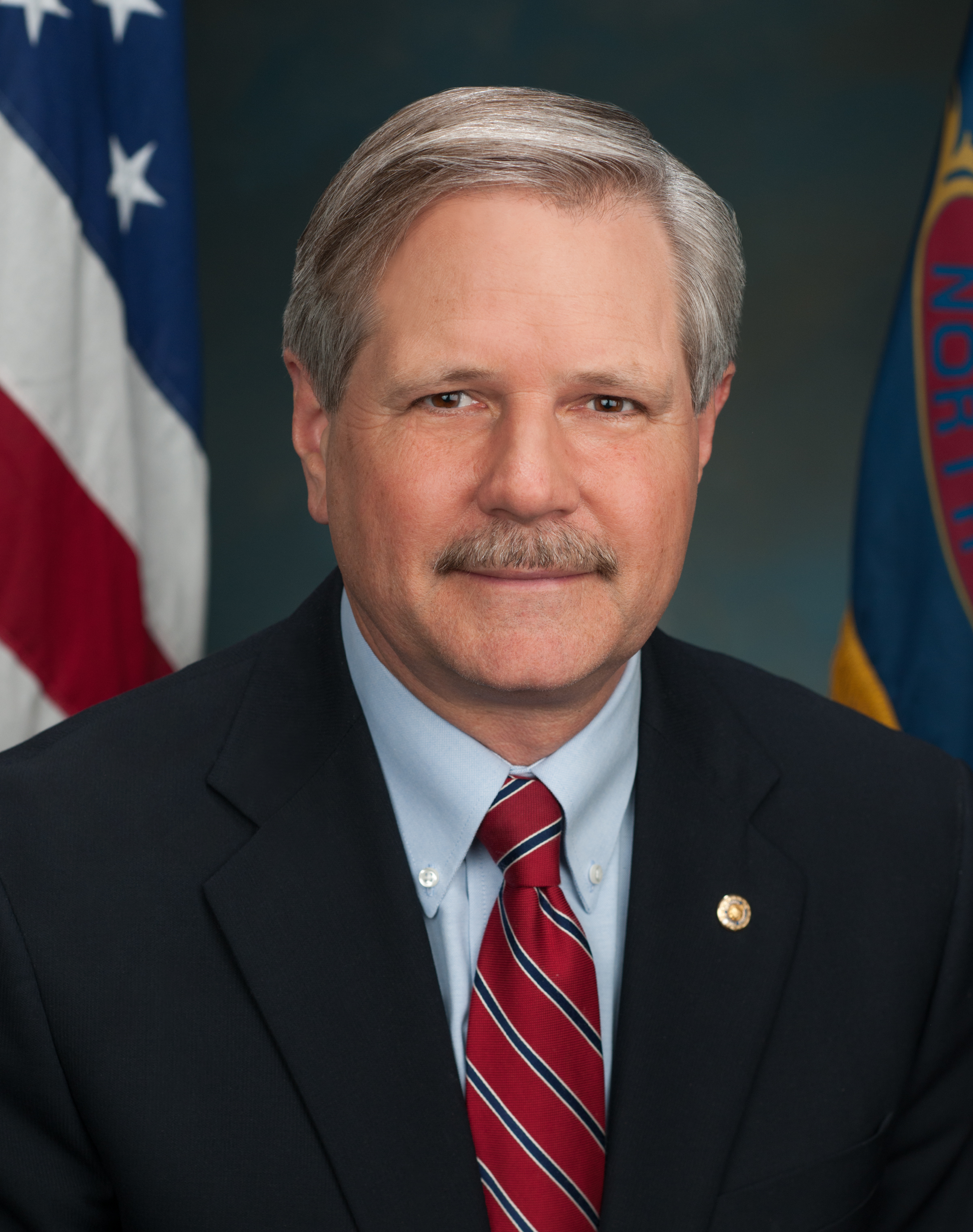

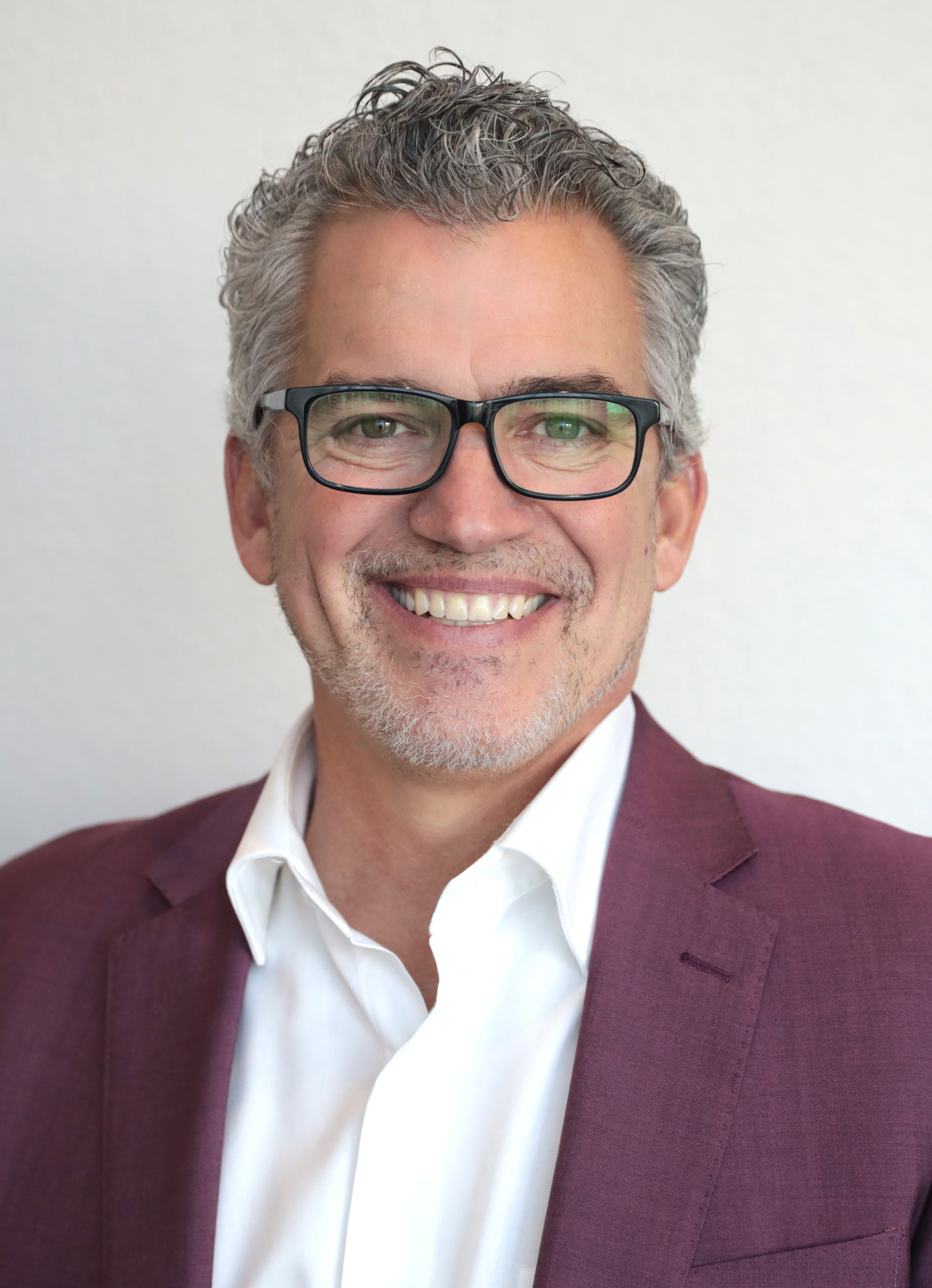
| Nominee | John Hoeven | Katrina Christiansen | Rick Becker |
| Party | Republican | Democratic–NPL | Independent |
| Popular vote | 135,474 | 59,995 | 44,406 |
| Percentage | 56.4% | 25.0% | 18.5% |
- County results Hoeven: 40–50% 60–70% 70–80% 80–90% >90% Christiansen: 40–50% 50–60%
U.S. senator before election
John Hoeven
Republican
Elected U.S. Senator
John Hoeven
Republican

Two-term Republican John Hoeven was re-elected in 2016 with 78.5% of the vote. On February 4, 2021, Hoeven campaign spokesman Dan Larson indicated that Hoeven was running for re-election in 2022. University of Jamestown engineering professor Katrina Christiansen defeated businessman Michael Steele in the Democratic primary election. Former state representative Rick Becker challenged Hoeven in the Republican primary but withdrew after losing the convention.

Hoeven and Christiansen won their respective primaries on June 14.

North Dakota Republican primary
| Party | Candidate | Votes | % |
|---|---|---|---|
| Republican | John Hoeven (incumbent) | 59,529 | 77.83 |
| Republican | Riley Kuntz | 16,400 | 21.44 |
| Write-in | | 557 | 0.73 |
| Total votes | | 76,486 | 100.00 |

North Dakota Democratic–NPL primary
| Party | Candidate | Votes | % |
|---|---|---|---|
| Democratic–NPL | Katrina Christiansen | 17,187 | 76.78 |
| Democratic–NPL | Michael Steele | 5,174 | 23.11 |
| Write-in | | 24 | 0.11 |
| Total votes | | 22,385 | 100.00 |

North Dakota general election
| Party | Candidate | Votes | % | ±% |
|---|---|---|---|---|
| Republican | John Hoeven (incumbent) | 135,474 | 56.41% | −22.07 |
| Democratic–NPL | Katrina Christiansen | 59,995 | 24.98% | +8.01 |
| Independent | Rick Becker | 44,406 | 18.49% | N/A |
| Write-in | | 265 | 0.11% | N/A |
| Total votes | | 240,140 | 100.0% | |
| Republican hold | | | | |

== Ohio ==
Ohio election
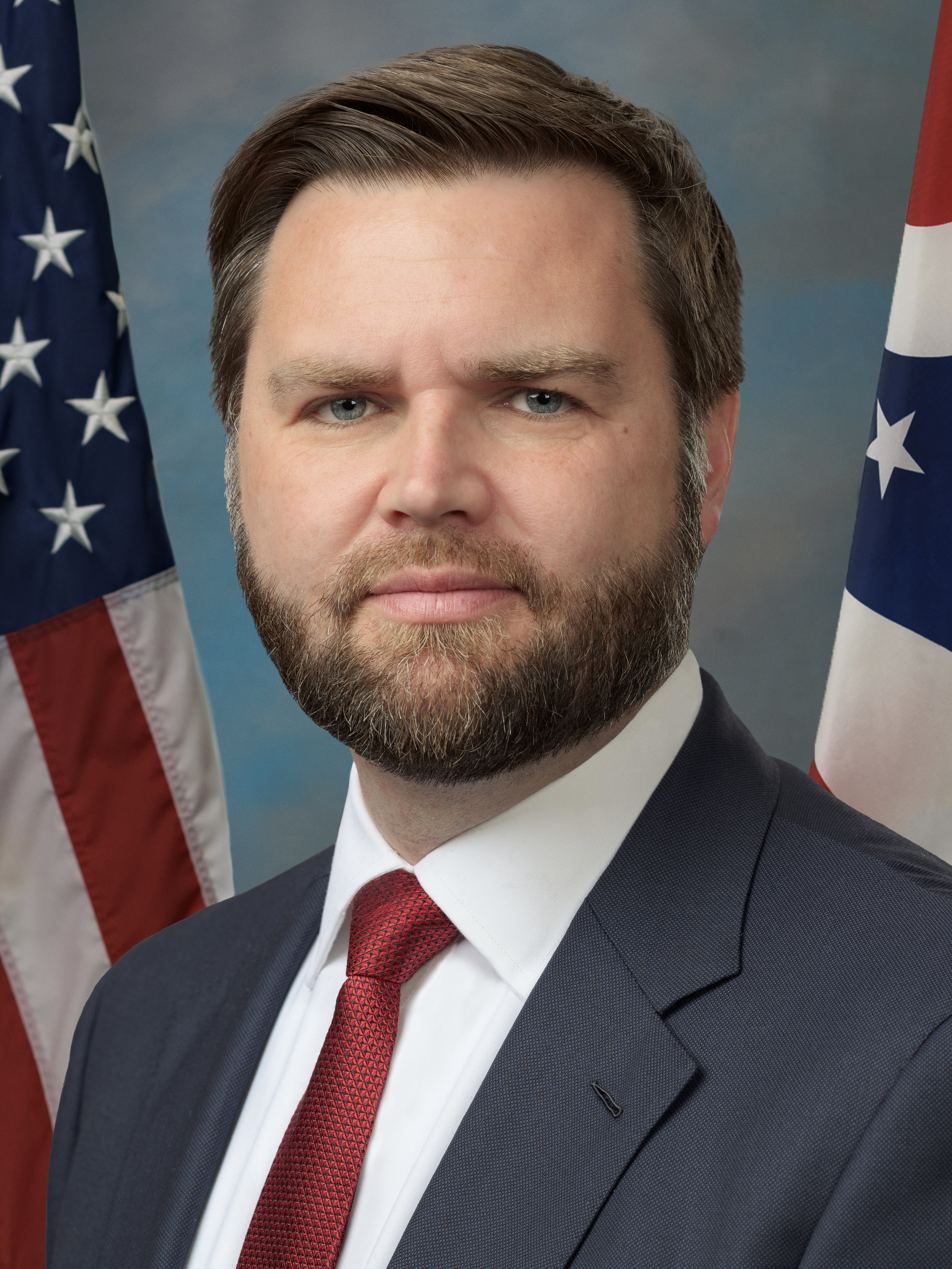

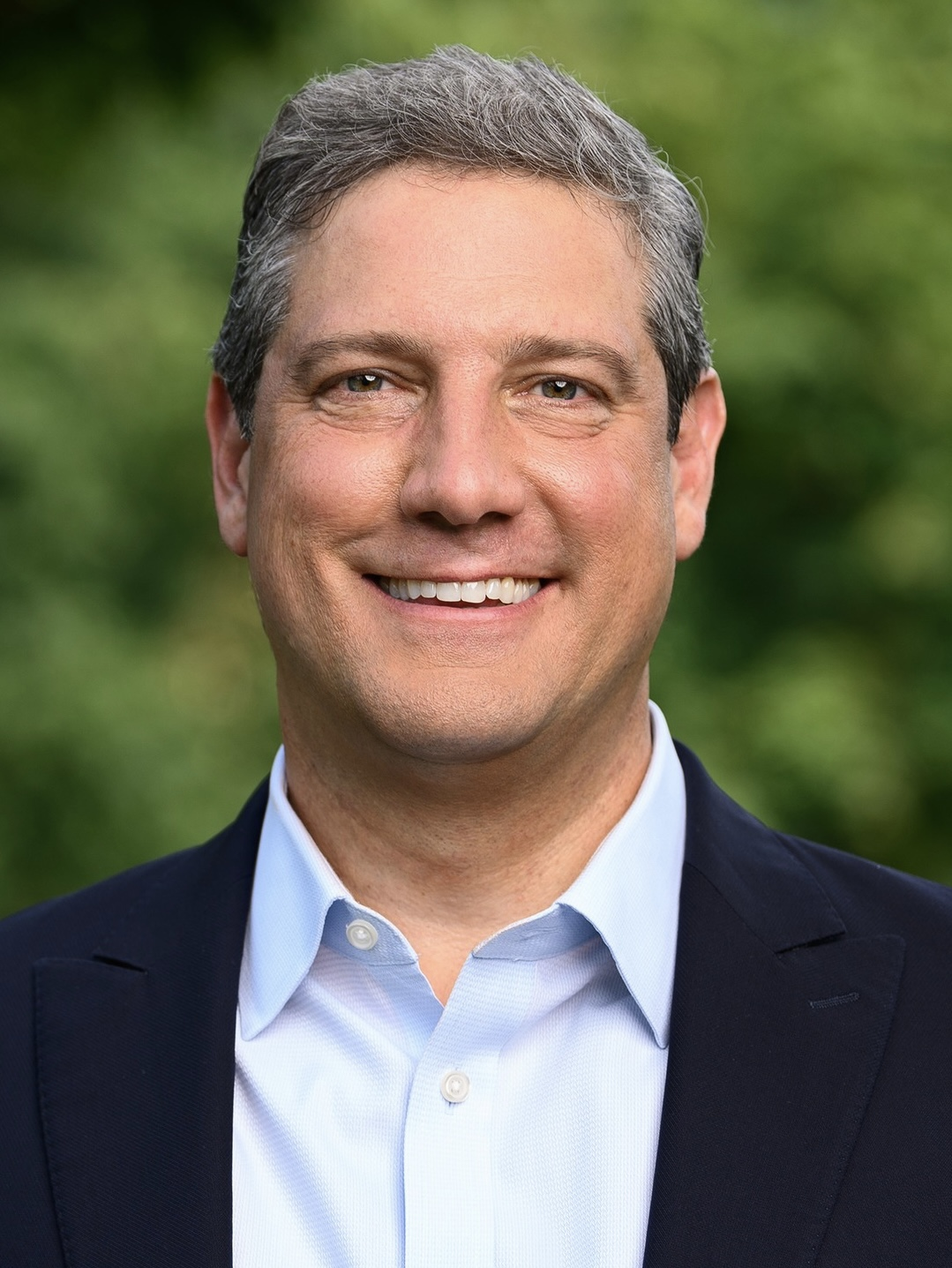
| Nominee | JD Vance | Tim Ryan |
| Party | Republican | Democratic |
| Popular vote | 2,192,114 | 1,939,489 |
| Percentage | 53.0% | 46.9% |
- County results Vance: 40–50% 50–60% 60–70% 70–80% 80–90% Ryan: 50–60% 60–70%
U.S. senator before election
Rob Portman
Republican
Elected U.S. Senator
JD Vance
Republican

Two-term Republican Rob Portman was re-elected in 2016 with 58% of the vote. On January 25, 2021, he announced that he would not be running for re-election.

Venture capitalist and author JD Vance was nominated in a crowded and competitive Republican primary, defeating USMCR veteran and former state treasurer Josh Mandel, state senator Matt Dolan, investment banker Mike Gibbons, and former Ohio Republican Party chair Jane Timken, among others. Vance was endorsed by former president Donald Trump late in the primary.

U.S. representative and 2020 presidential candidate, Tim Ryan, was the Democratic nominee.

Ohio Republican primary
| Party | Candidate | Votes | % |
|---|---|---|---|
| Republican | JD Vance | 344,736 | 32.22 |
| Republican | Josh Mandel | 255,854 | 23.92 |
| Republican | Matt Dolan | 249,239 | 23.30 |
| Republican | Mike Gibbons | 124,653 | 11.65 |
| Republican | Jane Timken | 62,779 | 5.87 |
| Republican | Mark Pukita | 22,692 | 2.12 |
| Republican | Neil Patel | 9,873 | 0.92 |
| Total votes | | 1,069,826 | 100.00 |

Ohio Democratic primary
| Party | Candidate | Votes | % |
|---|---|---|---|
| Democratic | Tim Ryan | 359,941 | 69.55 |
| Democratic | Morgan Harper | 92,347 | 17.84 |
| Democratic | Traci Johnson | 65,209 | 12.60 |
| Total votes | | 517,497 | 100.00 |

Ohio general election
| Party | Candidate | Votes | % | ±% |
|---|---|---|---|---|
| Republican | JD Vance | 2,192,114 | 53.04% | −4.99 |
| Democratic | Tim Ryan | 1,939,489 | 46.92% | +9.76 |
| Write-in | | 1,739 | 0.04% | N/A |
| Total votes | | 4,133,342 | 100.0% | |
| Republican hold | | | | |

== Oklahoma ==
There were two elections in Oklahoma due to the resignation of Jim Inhofe.

=== Oklahoma (regular) ===
Oklahoma regular election
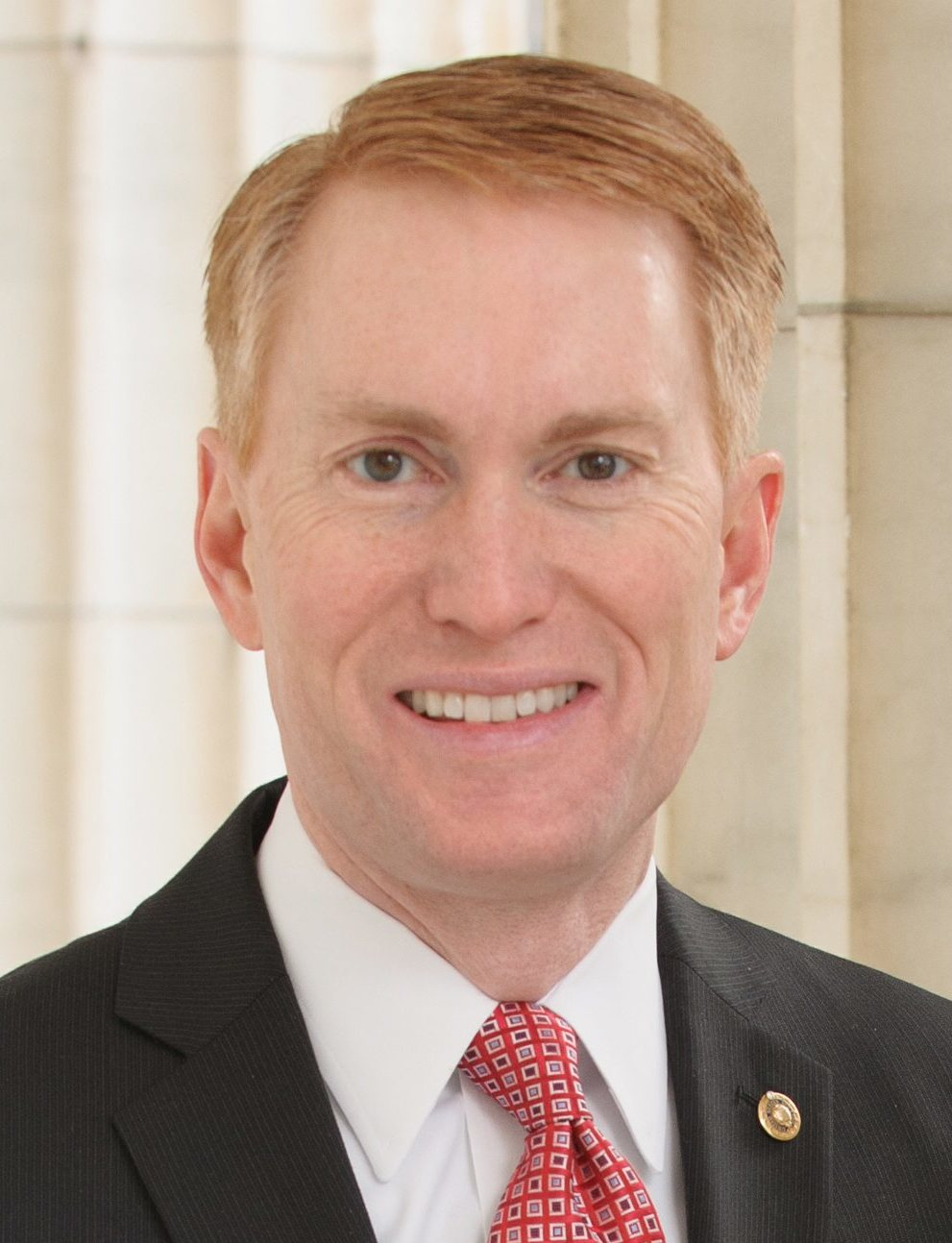

| Nominee | James Lankford | Madison Horn |
| Party | Republican | Democratic |
| Popular vote | 739,960 | 369,370 |
| Percentage | 64.3% | 32.1% |
- County results Lankford: 50–60% 60–70% 70–80% 80–90%
U.S. senator before election
James Lankford
Republican
Elected U.S. senator
James Lankford
Republican

One-term Republican James Lankford won the 2014 special election to serve the remainder of former U.S. senator Tom Coburn's term. Lankford won election to his first full term in 2016 with 67.7% of the vote. He announced that he would be running for re-election on April 6, 2021. Two Democratic candidates were competing in the runoff Democratic primary election.

Jackson Lahmeyer, the pastor for Sheridan Church and former Oklahoma state coordinator for the Billy Graham Evangelistic Association, challenged Lankford in the Republican primary.

Oklahoma Republican regular primary
| Party | Candidate | Votes | % |
|---|---|---|---|
| Republican | James Lankford (incumbent) | 243,132 | 67.83 |
| Republican | Jackson Lahmeyer | 94,572 | 26.38 |
| Republican | Joan Farr | 20,761 | 5.79 |
| Total votes | | 358,465 | 100.00 |

Oklahoma Democratic regular primary
| Party | Candidate | Votes | % |
|---|---|---|---|
| Democratic | Madison Horn | 60,691 | 37.19 |
| Democratic | Jason Bollinger | 27,374 | 16.77 |
| Democratic | Dennis Baker | 22,467 | 13.77 |
| Democratic | Jo Glenn | 21,198 | 12.99 |
| Democratic | Brandon Wade | 19,986 | 12.25 |
| Democratic | Arya Azma | 11,478 | 7.03 |
| Total votes | | 163,194 | 100.00 |

Oklahoma Democratic regular primary runoff
| Party | Candidate | Votes | % |
|---|---|---|---|
| Democratic | Madison Horn | 60,929 | 65.48 |
| Democratic | Jason Bollinger | 32,121 | 34.52 |
| Total votes | | 93,050 | 100.00 |

Oklahoma regular general election
| Party | Candidate | Votes | % | ±% |
|---|---|---|---|---|
| Republican | James Lankford (incumbent) | 739,960 | 64.30% | −3.44 |
| Democratic | Madison Horn | 369,370 | 32.10% | +7.52 |
| Independent | Michael Delaney | 20,907 | 1.82% | N/A |
| Libertarian | Kenneth Blevins | 20,495 | 1.78% | −1.22 |
| Total votes | | 1,150,732 | 100.0% | |
| Republican hold | | | | |

=== Oklahoma (special) ===
Oklahoma special election
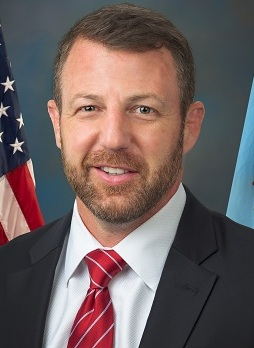

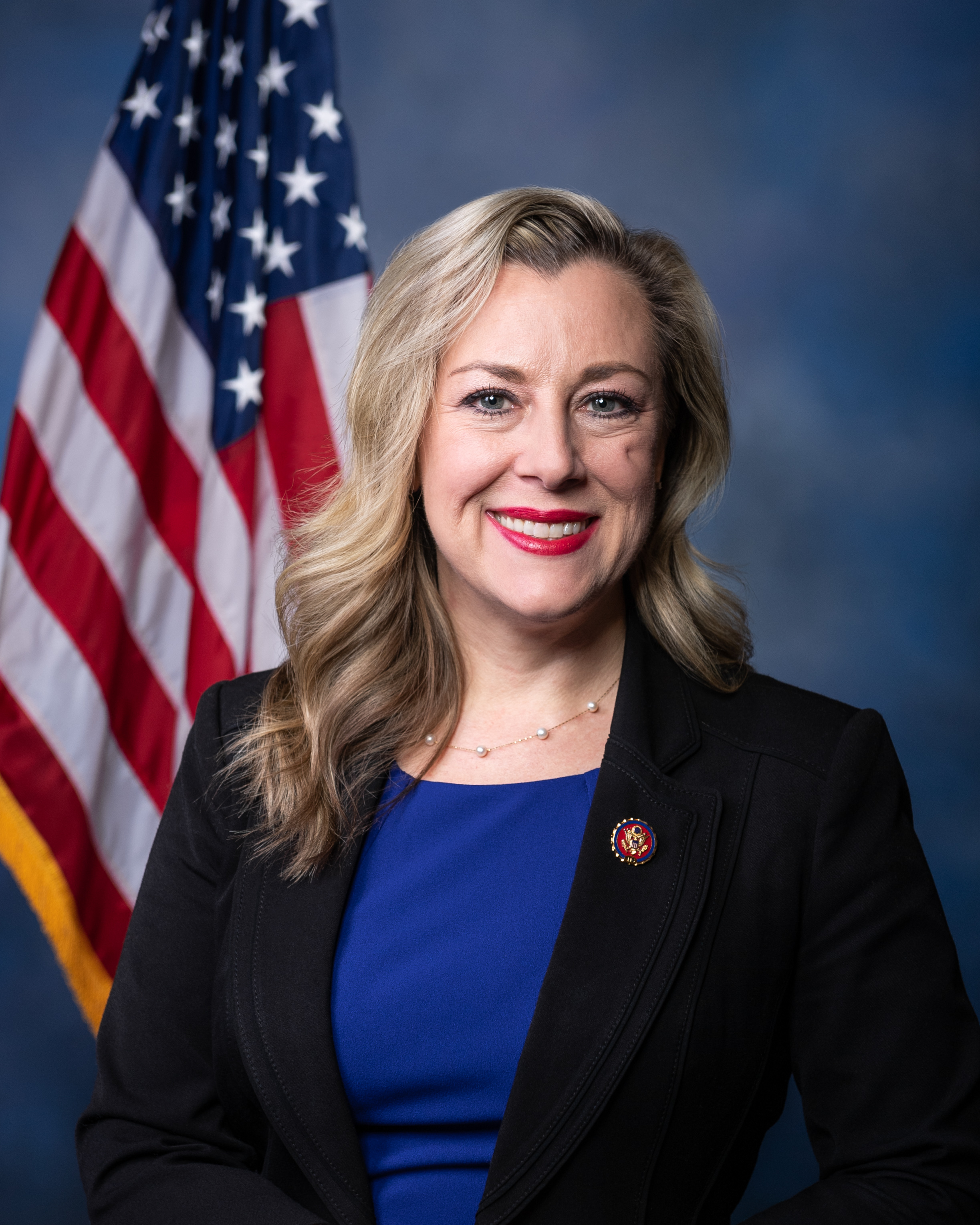
| Nominee | Markwayne Mullin | Kendra Horn |
| Party | Republican | Democratic |
| Popular vote | 710,643 | 405,389 |
| Percentage | 61.8% | 35.2% |
- County results Mullin: 50–60% 60–70% 70–80% 80–90% >90% Horn: 50–60%
U.S. senator before election
Jim Inhofe
Republican
Elected U.S. senator
Markwayne Mullin
Republican

Five-term incumbent Republican Jim Inhofe had been re-elected with 63% of the vote in 2020 and was not scheduled to be up for election again until 2026. However, Inhofe announced his intention to resign at the end of the 117th U.S. Congress. A special election to fill his seat took place in November 2022, concurrent with the other Senate elections. U.S. representative Markwayne Mullin defeated state House speaker T. W. Shannon in the runoff Republican primary election. Mullin and Shannon defeated Inhofe's chief of staff Luke Holland and others in the initial Republican primary election. Former U.S. representative Kendra Horn was the Democratic nominee, being her party's only candidate.

Markwayne Mullin, a member of the Cherokee Nation, became the first Native American to serve in the U.S. Senate since fellow Republican Ben Nighthorse Campbell retired from Congress in 2005.

Oklahoma Republican special primary
| Party | Candidate | Votes | % |
|---|---|---|---|
| Republican | Markwayne Mullin | 156,087 | 43.62 |
| Republican | T. W. Shannon | 62,746 | 17.53 |
| Republican | Nathan Dahm | 42,673 | 11.92 |
| Republican | Luke Holland | 40,353 | 11.28 |
| Republican | Scott Pruitt | 18,052 | 5.04 |
| Republican | Randy Grellner | 15,794 | 4.41 |
| Republican | Laura Moreno | 6,597 | 1.84 |
| Republican | Jessica Jean Garrison | 6,114 | 1.71 |
| Republican | Alex Gray (withdrawn) | 3,063 | 0.86 |
| Republican | John F. Tompkins | 2,332 | 0.65 |
| Republican | Adam Holley | 1,873 | 0.52 |
| Republican | Michael Coibion | 1,261 | 0.35 |
| Republican | Paul Royse | 900 | 0.25 |
| Total votes | | 357,845 | 100.00 |

Oklahoma Republican special primary runoff
| Party | Candidate | Votes | % |
|---|---|---|---|
| Republican | Markwayne Mullin | 183,118 | 65.08 |
| Republican | T. W. Shannon | 98,246 | 34.92 |
| Total votes | | 281,364 | 100.00 |

Oklahoma special general election
| Party | Candidate | Votes | % | ±% |
|---|---|---|---|---|
| Republican | Markwayne Mullin | 710,643 | 61.77% | −1.14 |
| Democratic | Kendra Horn | 405,389 | 35.24% | +2.49 |
| Libertarian | Robert Murphy | 17,386 | 1.51% | −0.70 |
| Independent | Ray Woods | 17,063 | 1.48% | N/A |
| Total votes | | 1,150,481 | 100.0% | |
| Republican hold | | | | |

== Oregon ==
Oregon election
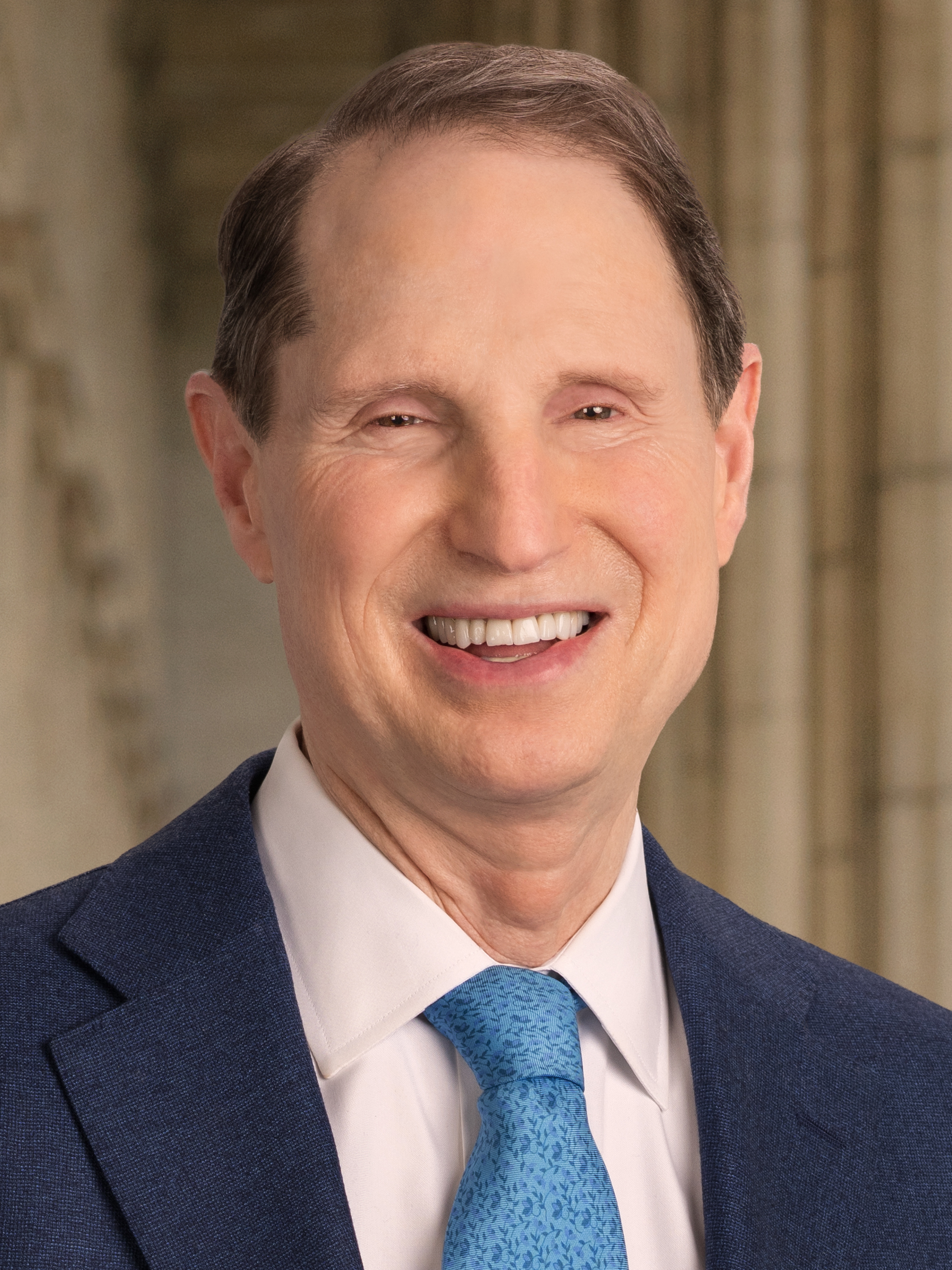

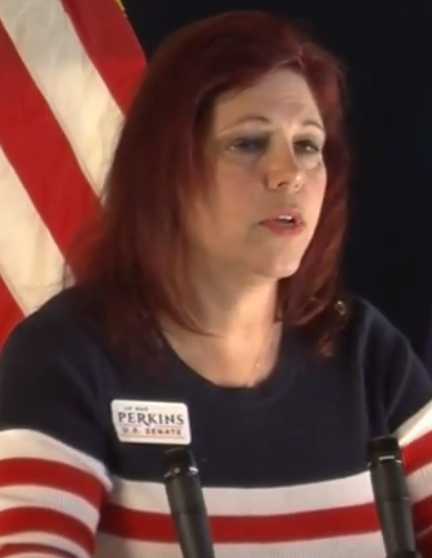
| Nominee | Ron Wyden | Jo Rae Perkins |
| Party | Democratic | Republican |
| Popular vote | 1,076,424 | 788,991 |
| Percentage | 55.8% | 40.9% |
- County results Wyden: 40–50% 50–60% 60–70% 70–80% Perkins: 40–50% 50–60% 60–70% 70–80%
U.S. senator before election
Ron Wyden
Democratic
Elected U.S. Senator
Ron Wyden
Democratic

Incumbent Democratic U.S. Senator Ron Wyden, who was first elected in a 1996 special election, ran for a fifth full term. Jo Rae Perkins, who unsuccessfully ran for Oregon's other Senate seat in 2020, won the Republican primary with 33.3% of the vote. The four candidates filing with the Oregon Secretary of State for this election included Chris Henry of the Oregon Progressive Party and Dan Pulju of the Pacific Green Party.

Wyden ultimately won the election with 55.8% of the statewide vote. This is the first victory of Wyden's since 1996 where none of the following counties went Democratic in a Senate Class III election: Gilliam, Jackson, Marion, Polk, Wasco and Yamhill. It is also the first time Columbia County supported the Republican nominee over Wyden.

Oregon Democratic primary
| Party | Candidate | Votes | % |
|---|---|---|---|
| Democratic | Ron Wyden (incumbent) | 439,665 | 89.38 |
| Democratic | William E. Barlow III | 35,025 | 7.12 |
| Democratic | Brent Thompson | 17,197 | 3.50 |
| Total votes | | 491,887 | 100.00 |

Oregon Republican primary
| Party | Candidate | Votes | % |
|---|---|---|---|
| Republican | Jo Rae Perkins | 115,701 | 33.32 |
| Republican | Darin Harbick | 107,506 | 30.96 |
| Republican | Sam Palmer | 42,703 | 12.30 |
| Republican | Jason Beebe | 39,456 | 11.36 |
| Republican | Christopher C. Christensen | 28,433 | 8.19 |
| Republican | Robert M. Fleming | 6,821 | 1.96 |
| Republican | Ibra A. Taher | 6,659 | 1.92 |
| Total votes | | 347,279 | 100.00 |

Oregon general election
| Party | Candidate | Votes | % | ±% |
|---|---|---|---|---|
| Democratic | Ron Wyden (incumbent) | 1,076,424 | 55.83% | −0.77 |
| Republican | Jo Rae Perkins | 788,991 | 40.92% | +7.57 |
| Progressive | Chris Henry | 36,883 | 1.91% | N/A |
| Pacific Green | Dan Pulju | 23,454 | 1.22% | −1.28 |
| Write-in | | 2,197 | 0.11% | +0.01 |
| Total votes | | 1,927,949 | 100.0% | |
| Democratic hold | | | | |

== Pennsylvania ==
Pennsylvania election
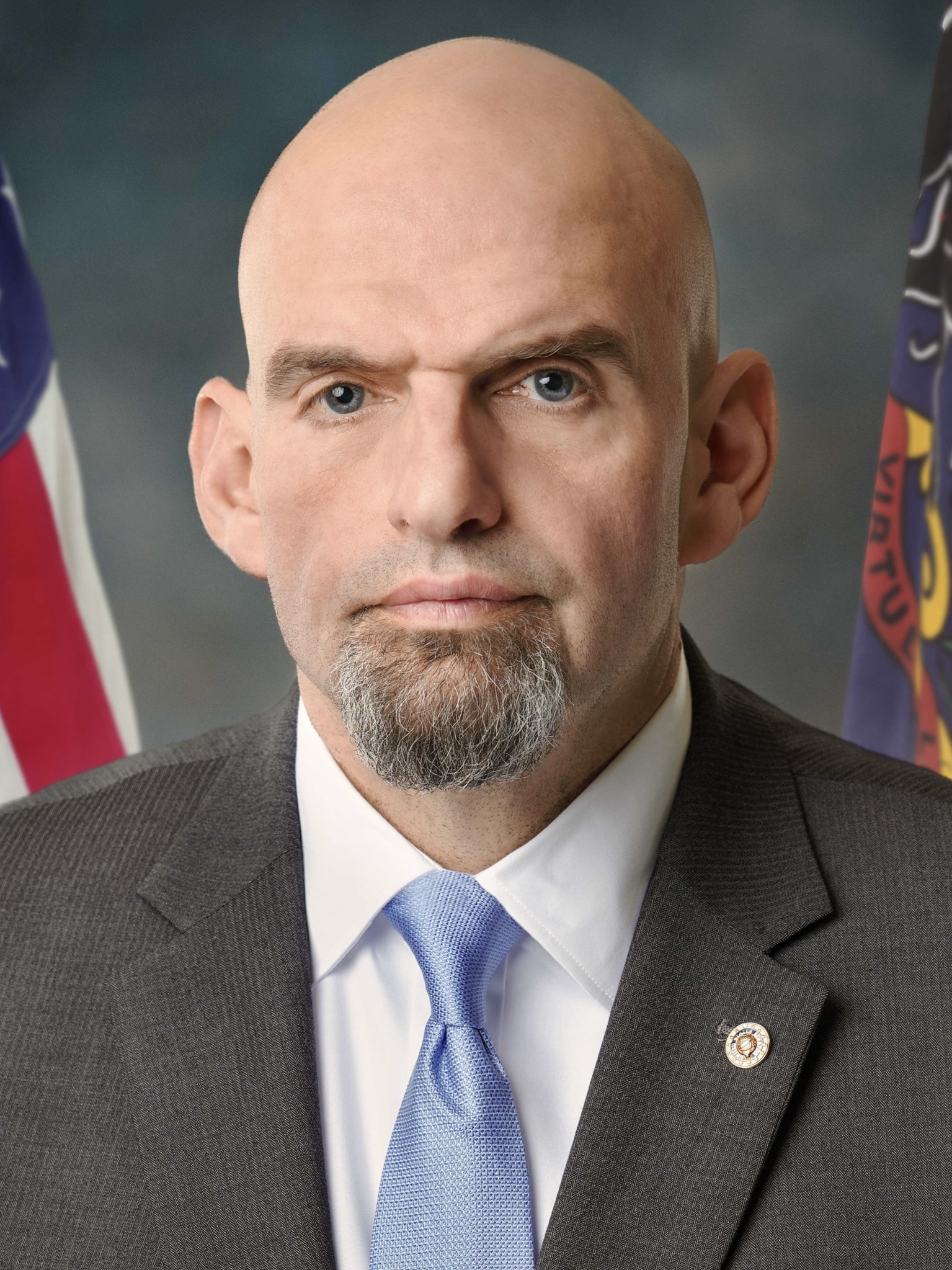

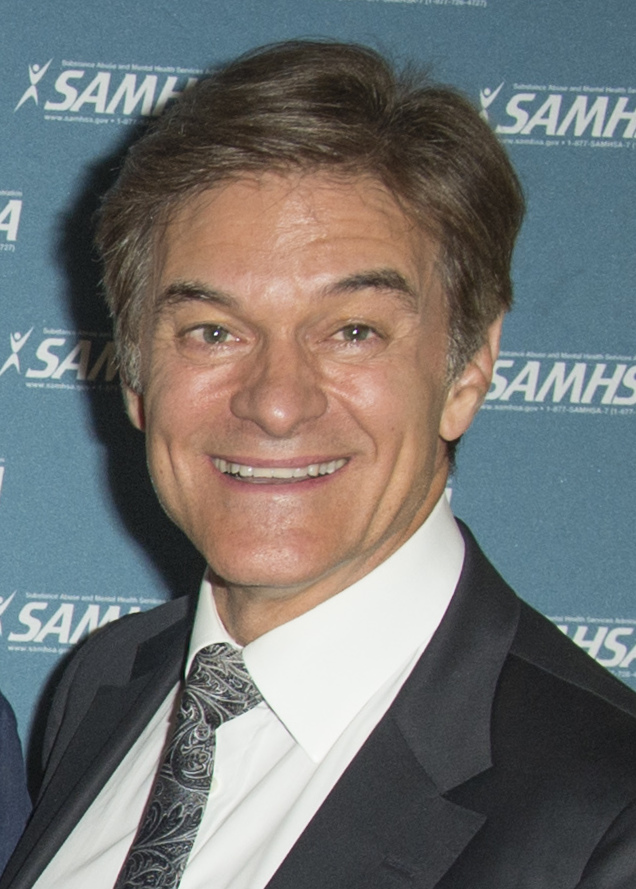
| Nominee | John Fetterman | Mehmet Oz |
| Party | Democratic | Republican |
| Popular vote | 2,751,012 | 2,487,260 |
| Percentage | 51.2% | 46.3% |
- County results Fetterman: 50–60% 60–70% 80–90% Oz: 50–60% 60–70% 70–80% 80–90%
U.S. senator before election
Pat Toomey
Republican
Elected U.S. Senator
John Fetterman
Democratic

Two-term Republican Pat Toomey was re-elected in 2016 with 48.8% of the vote. On October 5, 2020, Toomey announced that he would retire at the end of his term.

Lieutenant Governor John Fetterman easily defeated state representative Malcolm Kenyatta and U.S. representative Conor Lamb in the Democratic primary.

Mehmet Oz, host of The Dr. Oz Show and cardiothoracic surgeon, narrowly defeated business executive Dave McCormick, 2018 U.S. Senate candidate Jeff Bartos, 2018 candidate for Pennsylvania's 7th congressional district Sean Gale, political commentator Kathy Barnette, and former U.S. ambassador to Denmark Carla Sands, after a bitter Republican primary.

Pennsylvania Republican primary
| Party | Candidate | Votes | % |
|---|---|---|---|
| Republican | Mehmet Oz | 420,168 | 31.21 |
| Republican | Dave McCormick | 419,218 | 31.14 |
| Republican | Kathy Barnette | 331,903 | 24.66 |
| Republican | Carla Sands | 73,360 | 5.45 |
| Republican | Jeff Bartos | 66,684 | 4.95 |
| Republican | Sean Gale | 20,266 | 1.51 |
| Republican | George Bochetto | 14,492 | 1.08 |
| Total votes | | 1,346,091 | 100.00 |

Pennsylvania Democratic primary
| Party | Candidate | Votes | % |
|---|---|---|---|
| Democratic | John Fetterman | 753,557 | 58.65 |
| Democratic | Conor Lamb | 337,498 | 26.27 |
| Democratic | Malcolm Kenyatta | 139,393 | 10.85 |
| Democratic | Alexandria Khalil | 54,460 | 4.24 |
| Total votes | | 1,284,908 | 100.00 |

Pennsylvania general election
| Party | Candidate | Votes | % | ±% |
|---|---|---|---|---|
| Democratic | John Fetterman | 2,751,012 | 51.25% | +3.91 |
| Republican | Mehmet Oz | 2,487,260 | 46.33% | −2.44 |
| Libertarian | Erik Gerhardt | 72,887 | 1.36% | −2.53 |
| Green | Richard Weiss | 30,434 | 0.57% | N/A |
| Keystone | Dan Wassmer | 26,428 | 0.49% | N/A |
| Total votes | | 5,368,021 | 100.0% | |
| Democratic gain from Republican | | | | |

== South Carolina ==
South Carolina election
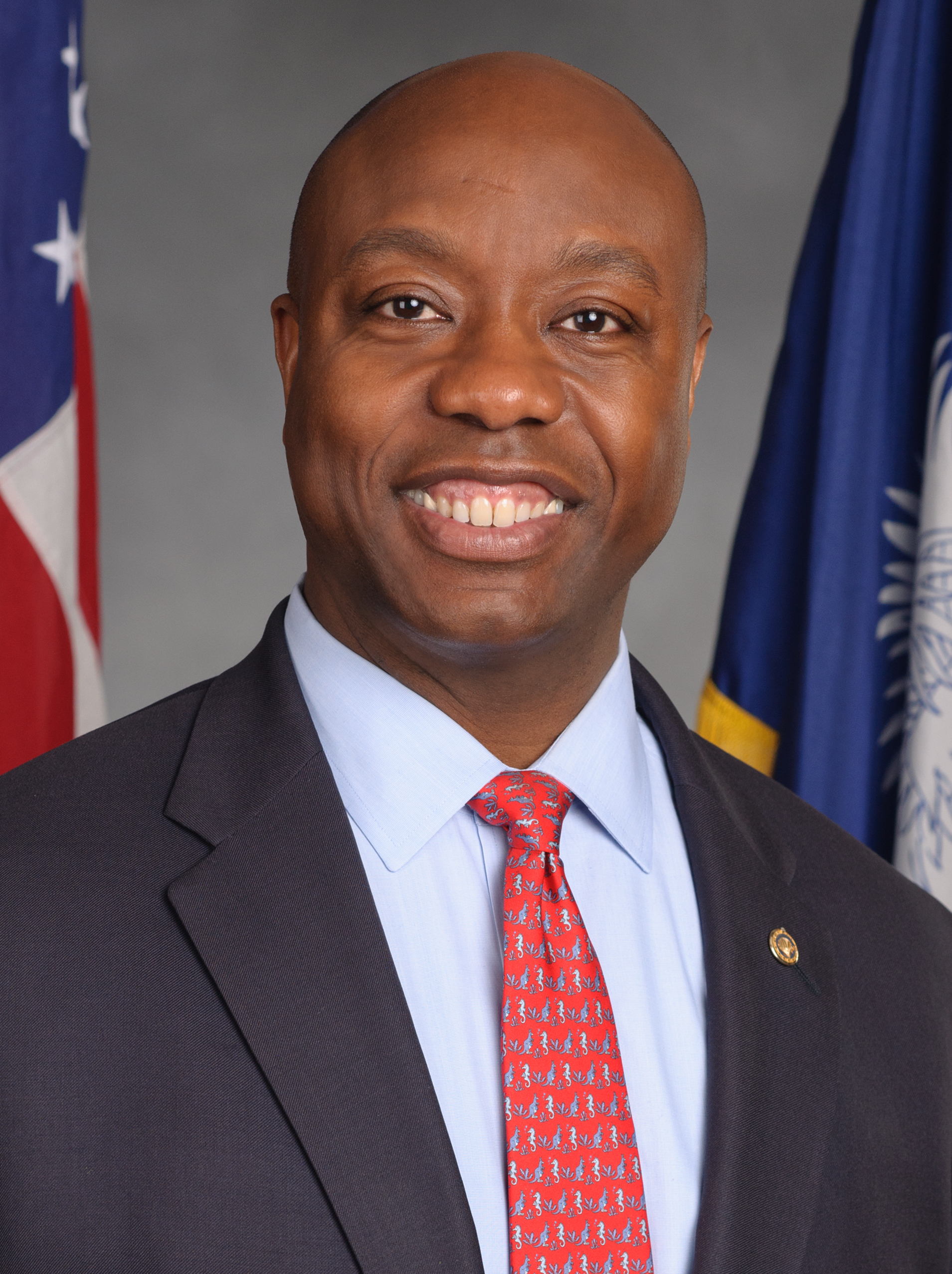

| Nominee | Tim Scott | Krystle Matthews |
| Party | Republican | Democratic |
| Popular vote | 1,066,274 | 627,616 |
| Percentage | 62.9% | 37.0% |
- County results Scott: 50–60% 60–70% 70–80% Matthews: 50–60% 60–70%
U.S. senator before election
Tim Scott
Republican
Elected U.S. senator
Tim Scott
Republican

One-term Republican Tim Scott was appointed in 2013 and won election to his first full term in 2016 with 60.6% of the vote. He said that while he ran for re-election in 2022, it would be his last time. In the Democratic primary, state representative Krystle Matthews defeated author and activist Catherine Fleming Bruce in a runoff. Angela Geter, chairwoman of the Spartanburg County Democratic Party, also ran in the primary.

South Carolina Democratic primary
| Party | Candidate | Votes | % |
|---|---|---|---|
| Democratic | Catherine Fleming Bruce | 59,777 | 34.69 |
| Democratic | Krystle Matthews | 57,278 | 33.24 |
| Democratic | Angela Geter | 55,281 | 32.08 |
| Total votes | | 172,336 | 100.00 |

South Carolina Democratic primary runoff
| Party | Candidate | Votes | % |
|---|---|---|---|
| Democratic | Krystle Matthews | 25,300 | 55.77 |
| Democratic | Catherine Fleming Bruce | 20,064 | 44.23 |
| Total votes | | 45,364 | 100.00 |

South Carolina general election
| Party | Candidate | Votes | % | ±% |
|---|---|---|---|---|
| Republican | Tim Scott (incumbent) | 1,066,274 | 62.88% | +2.31 |
| Democratic | Krystle Matthews | 627,616 | 37.01% | +0.08 |
| Write-in | | 1,812 | 0.11% | +0.02 |
| Total votes | | 1,695,702 | 100.0% | |
| Republican hold | | | | |

== South Dakota ==
South Dakota election
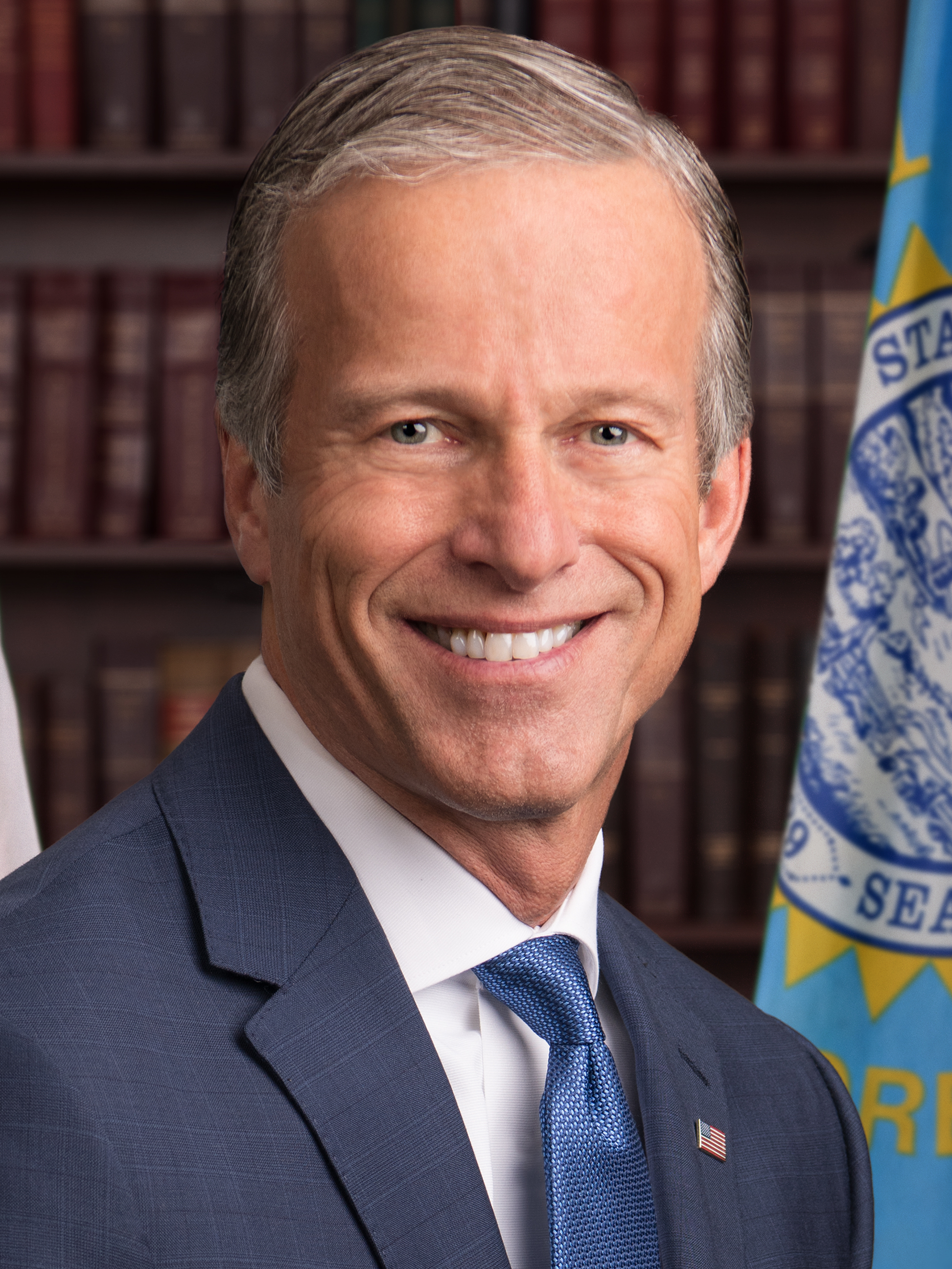

| Nominee | John Thune | Brian Bengs |
| Party | Republican | Democratic |
| Popular vote | 242,316 | 91,007 |
| Percentage | 69.6% | 26.2% |
- County results Thune: 40–50% 50–60% 60–70% 70–80% 80–90% >90% Bengs: 50–60% 60–70% 70–80%
U.S. senator before election
John Thune
Republican
Elected U.S. Senator
John Thune
Republican

Three-term Republican and U.S. Senate minority whip John Thune was re-elected in 2016 with 71.8% of the vote and ran for reelection to a fourth term. Thune had been subject to some backlash from former president Trump and his supporters in the state of South Dakota, leading to speculation of a potential primary challenge. He defeated Bruce Whalen, an Oglala Sioux tribal administrator and former chair of the Oglala Lakota County Republican Party in the Republican primary.

The Democratic candidate was author, navy veteran, and assistant professor of criminal justice at Northern State University, Brian Bengs, who won the primary unopposed.

South Dakota Republican primary
| Party | Candidate | Votes | % |
|---|---|---|---|
| Republican | John Thune (incumbent) | 85,613 | 72.24 |
| Republican | Bruce Whalen | 24,071 | 20.31 |
| Republican | Mark Mowry | 8,827 | 7.45 |
| Total votes | | 118,511 | 100.00 |

South Dakota general election
| Party | Candidate | Votes | % | ±% |
|---|---|---|---|---|
| Republican | John Thune (incumbent) | 242,316 | 69.63% | −2.20 |
| Democratic | Brian Bengs | 91,007 | 26.15% | −2.02 |
| Libertarian | Tamara Lesnar | 14,697 | 4.22% | N/A |
| Total votes | | 348,020 | 100.0% | |
| Republican hold | | | | |

== Utah ==
Utah election
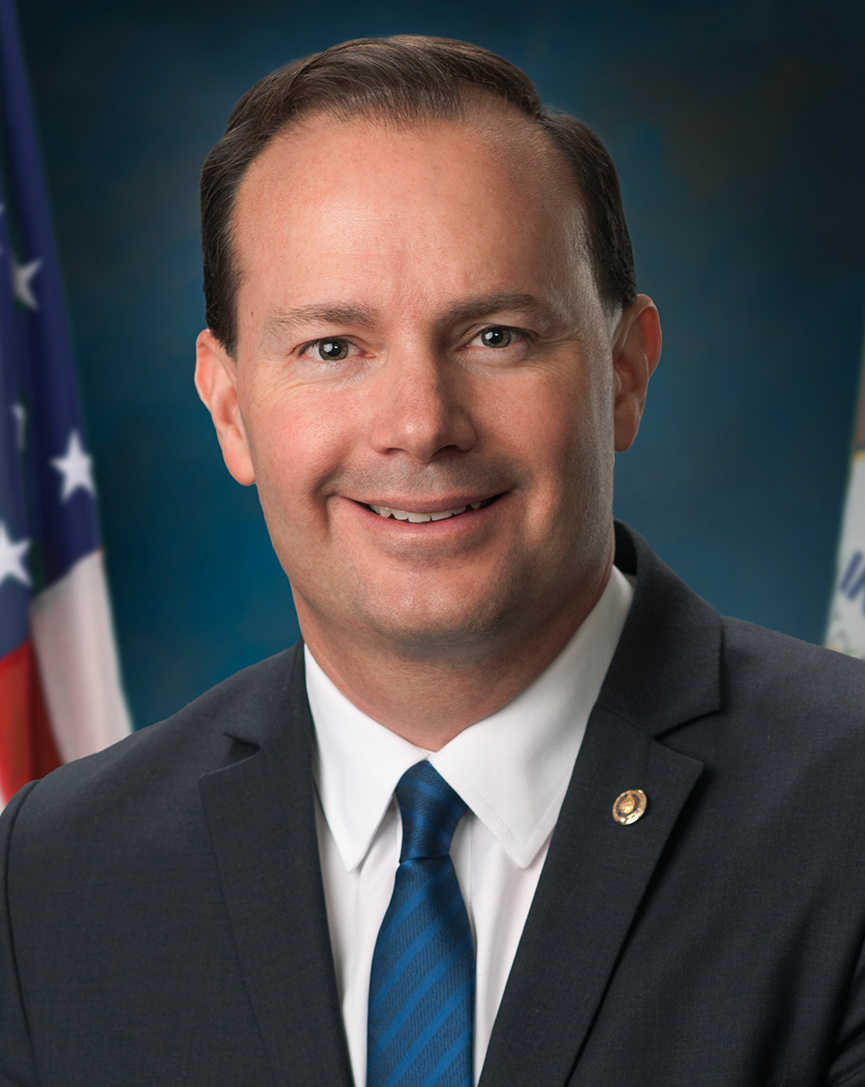

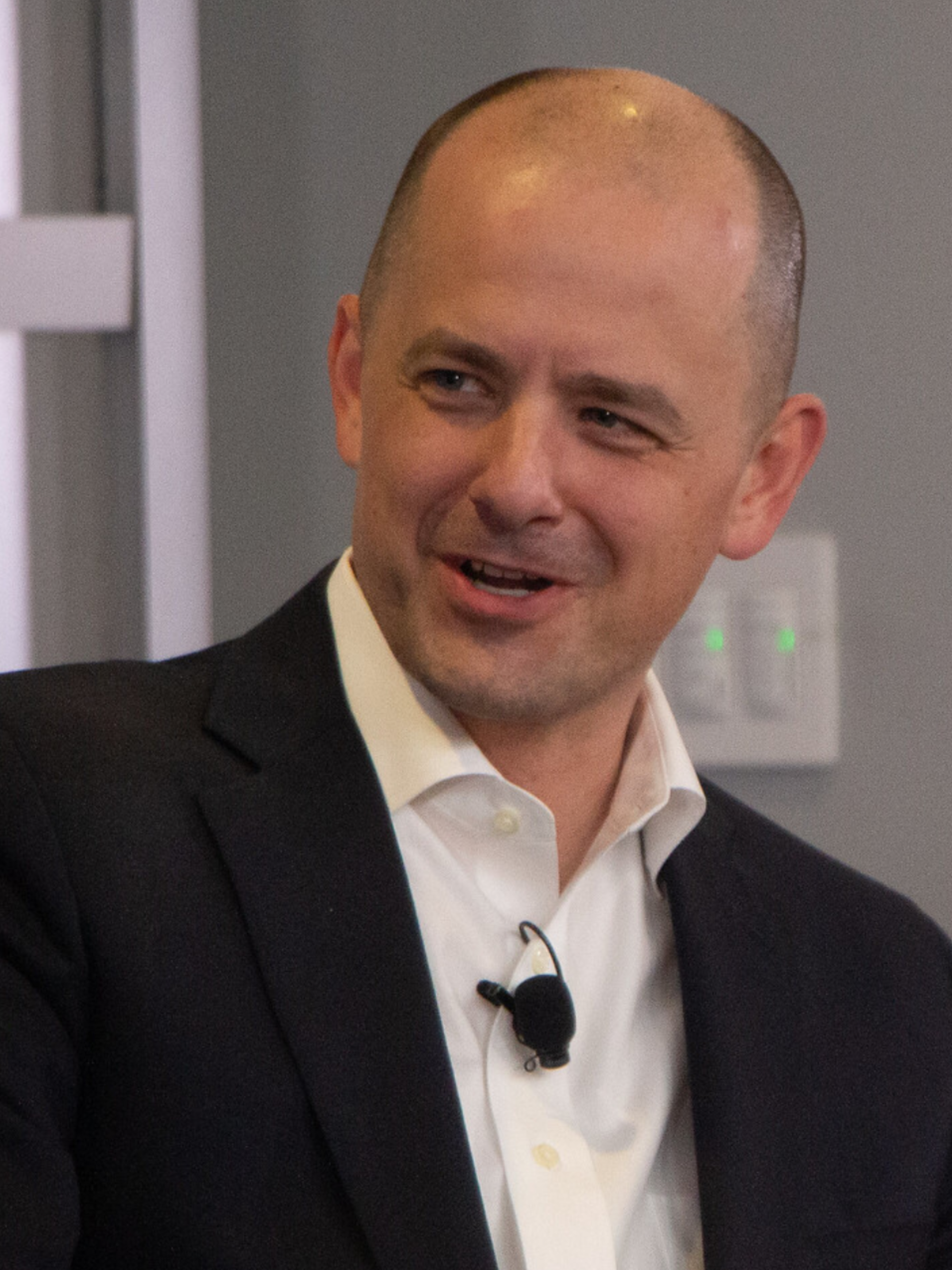
| Nominee | Mike Lee | Evan McMullin |
| Party | Republican | Independent |
| Popular vote | 571,974 | 459,958 |
| Percentage | 53.2% | 42.7% |
- County results Lee: 50–60% 60–70% 70–80% 80–90% McMullin: 50–60% 60–70%
U.S. senator before election
Mike Lee
Republican
Elected U.S. senator
Mike Lee
Republican

Two-term Republican Mike Lee was re-elected in 2016 with 68.2% of the vote. He defeated former state representative Becky Edwards as well as businessman and political advisor Ally Isom in the Republican primary.

The Utah Democratic Party declined to field their own candidate against Lee and instead endorsed independent Evan McMullin, a political activist, former Republican, former CIA operations officer, and 2016 presidential candidate.

Lee won re-election to a third term, defeating McMullin. This was the first Senate election in Utah's history in which there was no Democratic nominee. Lee's performance was the worst for a Republican in a Utah U.S. Senate election since 1974, while McMullin's was the best ever for an independent in a Utah U.S. Senate race and the best for a non-Republican since 1976.

Utah Republican primary
| Party | Candidate | Votes | % |
|---|---|---|---|
| Republican | Mike Lee (incumbent) | 258,089 | 61.94 |
| Republican | Becky Edwards | 123,617 | 29.67 |
| Republican | Ally Isom | 34,997 | 8.40 |
| Total votes | | 416,703 | 100.00 |

Utah general election
| Party | Candidate | Votes | % | ±% |
|---|---|---|---|---|
| Republican | Mike Lee (incumbent) | 571,974 | 53.15% | −15.00 |
| Independent | Evan McMullin | 459,958 | 42.74% | N/A |
| Libertarian | James Hansen | 31,784 | 2.95% | N/A |
| Independent American | Tommy Williams | 12,103 | 1.12% | −1.33 |
| Write-in | | 242 | 0.02% | N/A |
| Total votes | | 1,076,061 | 100.0% | |
| Republican hold | | | | |

== Vermont ==
Vermont election
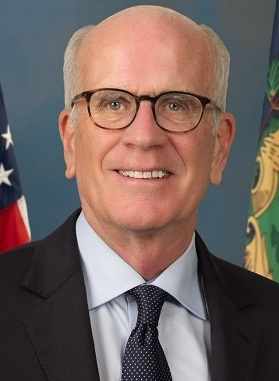

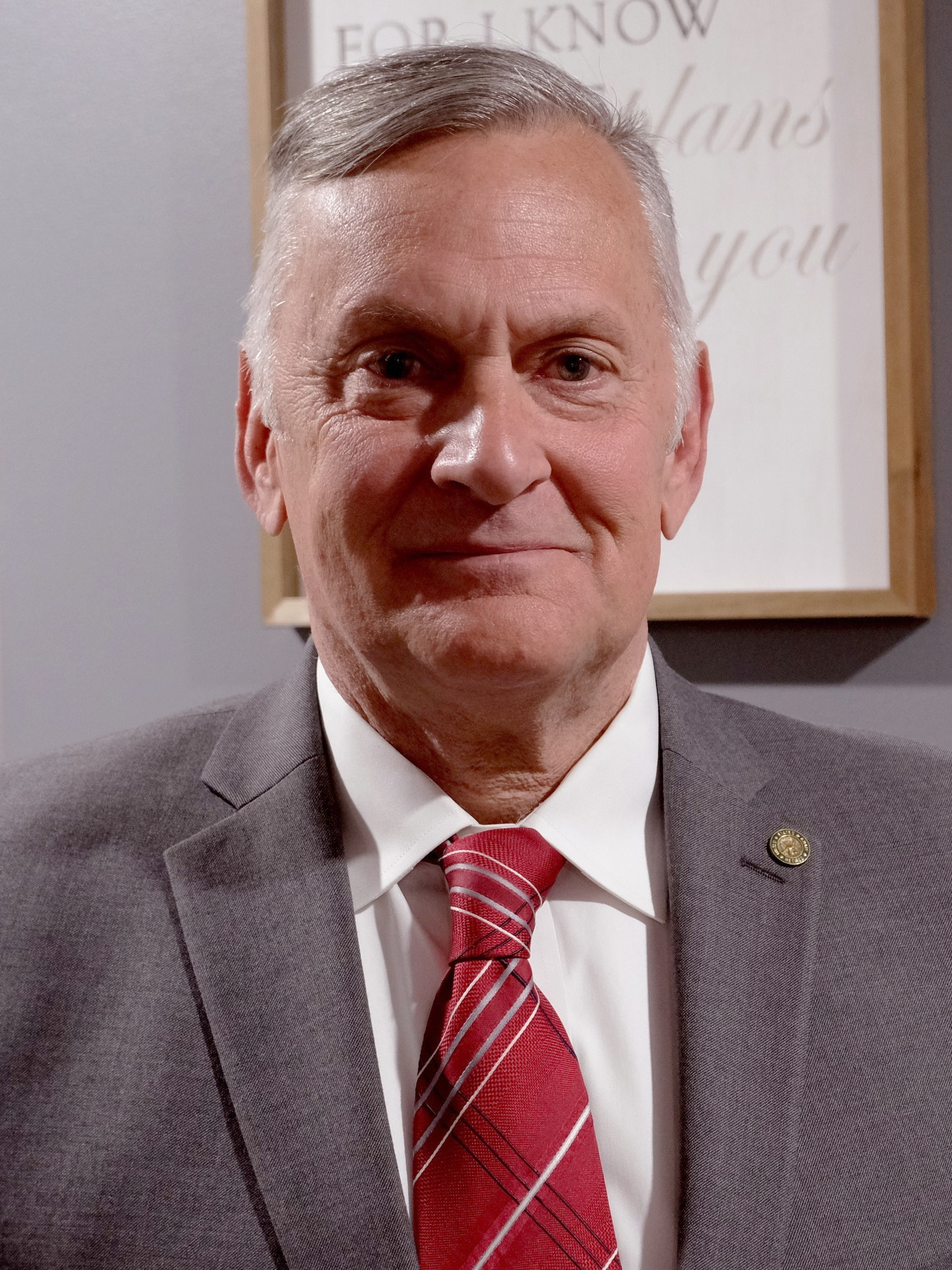
| Nominee | Peter Welch | Gerald Malloy |
| Party | Democratic | Republican |
| Popular vote | 196,575 | 80,468 |
| Percentage | 68.5% | 28.0% |
- County results Welch: 50-60% 60-70% 70-80% Malloy: 40-50%
U.S. senator before election
Patrick Leahy
Democratic
Elected U.S. senator
Peter Welch
Democratic

The most senior senator, an eight-term Democrat and president pro tempore Patrick Leahy, was re-elected in 2016 with 61.3% of the vote. On November 15, 2021, Leahy announced that he would not seek re-election to a ninth term.

Vermont's at-large representative, Democrat Peter Welch, ran to succeed Leahy.

Former military officer Gerald Malloy was the Republican nominee, having narrowly defeated former United States attorney for the District of Vermont Christina Nolan in the primary.

Vermont Democratic primary
| Party | Candidate | Votes | % |
|---|---|---|---|
| Democratic | Peter Welch | 86,603 | 87.01 |
| Democratic | Isaac Evans-Frantz | 7,230 | 7.26 |
| Democratic | Niki Thran | 5,104 | 5.13 |
| Write-in | | 599 | 0.60 |
| Total votes | | 99,536 | 100.00 |

Vermont Republican primary
| Party | Candidate | Votes | % |
|---|---|---|---|
| Republican | Gerald Malloy | 12,169 | 42.39 |
| Republican | Christina Nolan | 10,825 | 37.70 |
| Republican | Myers Mermel | 5,227 | 18.21 |
| Write-in | | 489 | 1.70 |
| Total votes | | 28,710 | 100.00 |

Vermont general election
| Party | Candidate | Votes | % | ±% |
|---|---|---|---|---|
| Democratic | Peter Welch | 196,575 | 68.47% | +7.21 |
| Republican | Gerald Malloy | 80,468 | 28.03% | −5.00 |
| Independent | Dawn Marie Ellis | 2,752 | 0.96% | N/A |
| Green Mountain Peace and Justice | Natasha Diamondstone-Kohout | 1,574 | 0.55% | −0.48 |
| Independent | Kerry Patrick Raheb | 1,532 | 0.53% | N/A |
| Independent | Mark Coester | 1,273 | 0.44% | N/A |
| Independent | Stephen Duke | 1,209 | 0.42% | N/A |
| Independent | Cris Ericson | 1,105 | 0.38% | −2.54 |
| Write-in | | 612 | 0.21% | +0.11 |
| Total votes | | 287,100 | 100.0% | |
| Democratic hold | | | | |

== Washington ==
Washington election
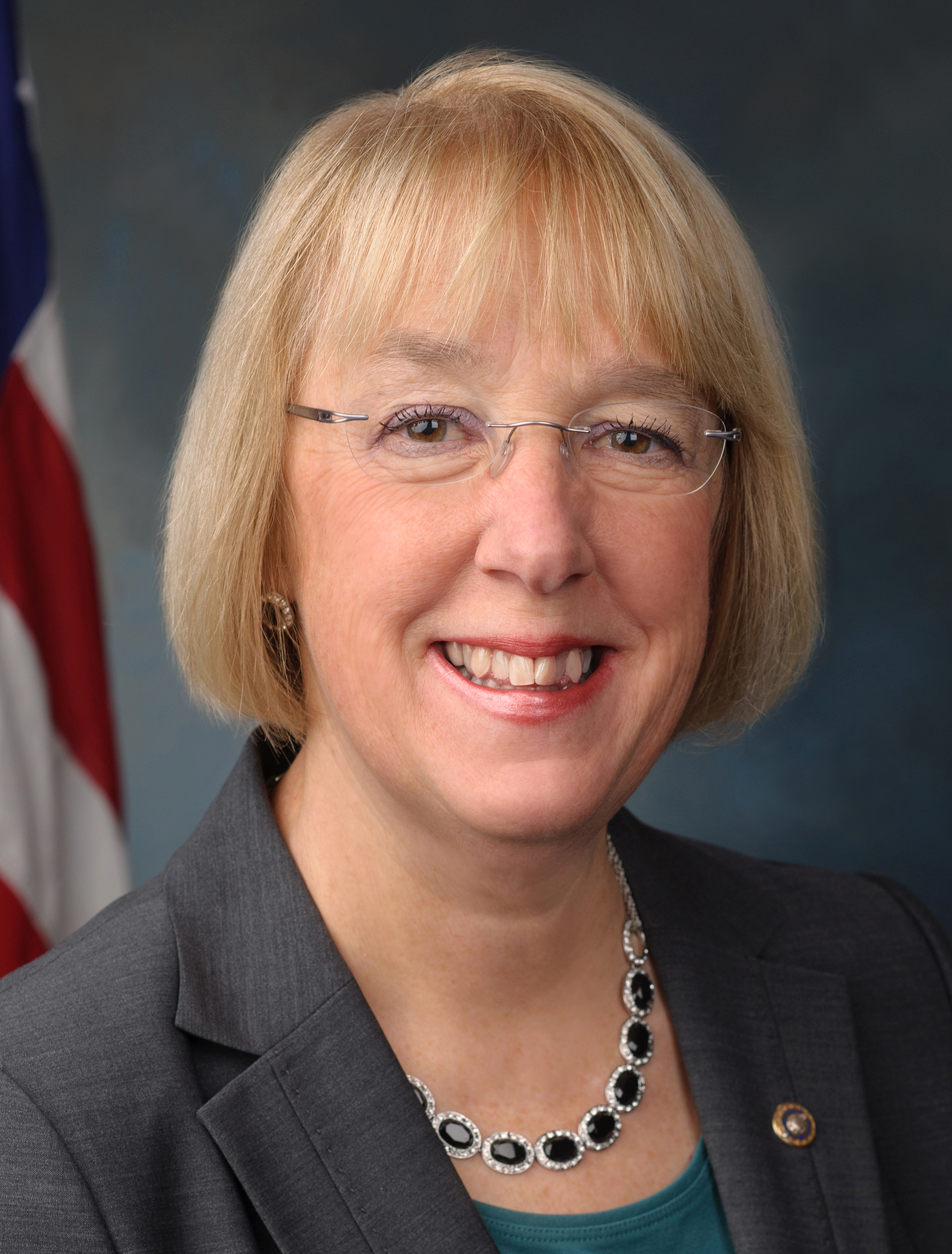

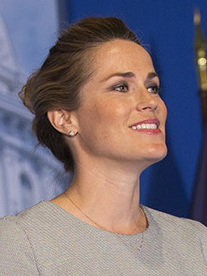
| Candidate | Patty Murray | Tiffany Smiley |
| Party | Democratic | Republican |
| Popular vote | 1,741,827 | 1,299,322 |
| Percentage | 57.1% | 42.6% |
- County results Murray: 50–60% 70–80% Smiley: 50–60% 60–70% 70–80%
U.S. senator before election
Patty Murray
Democratic
Elected U.S. Senator
Patty Murray
Democratic

In 2022, the Washington state blanket primary had 18 candidates on the ballot for the U.S. Senate seat. Democrat Patty Murray ran for re-election to a sixth term. She won her place on the general election ballot with 52.3% of the vote. Republican nurse Tiffany Smiley also ran for the Senate seat, and advanced to the general election after coming in second in the blanket primary with 33.7% of the vote.

Murray defeated Smiley and won re-election to a sixth term in the November 8, 2022 election, receiving 57% of the vote. Smiley conceded the following day.

Washington blanket primary
| Party | Candidate | Votes | % |
|---|---|---|---|
| Democratic | Patty Murray (incumbent) | 1,002,811 | 52.26 |
| Republican | Tiffany Smiley | 646,917 | 33.71 |
| Trump Republican | Leon Lawson | 59,134 | 3.08 |
| Republican | John Guenther | 55,426 | 2.89 |
| Democratic | Ravin Pierre | 22,172 | 1.16 |
| JFK Republican | Dave Saulibio | 19,341 | 1.01 |
| Independent | Naz Paul | 18,858 | 0.98 |
| Republican | Bill Hirt | 15,276 | 0.80 |
| Democratic | Mohammad Hassan Said | 13,995 | 0.73 |
| Socialist Workers | Henry Clay Dennison | 13,901 | 0.72 |
| Democratic | Dr Pano Churchill | 11,859 | 0.62 |
| Democratic | Bryan Solstin | 9,627 | 0.50 |
| Independent | Charlie "Chuck" Jackson | 8,604 | 0.45 |
| Independent | Jon Butler | 5,413 | 0.28 |
| Independent | Thor Amundson | 5,133 | 0.27 |
| No party preference | Martin D. Hash | 4,725 | 0.25 |
| No party preference | Dan Phan Doan | 3,049 | 0.16 |
| Democratic | Sam Cusmir | 2,688 | 0.14 |
| Total votes | | 1,918,929 | 100.00 |

Washington general election
| Party | Candidate | Votes | % | ±% |
|---|---|---|---|---|
| Democratic | Patty Murray (incumbent) | 1,741,827 | 57.15% | −1.86 |
| Republican | Tiffany Smiley | 1,299,322 | 42.63% | +1.64 |
| Write-in | | 6,751 | 0.22% | N/A |
| Total votes | | 3,047,900 | 100.0% | |

== Wisconsin ==
Wisconsin election
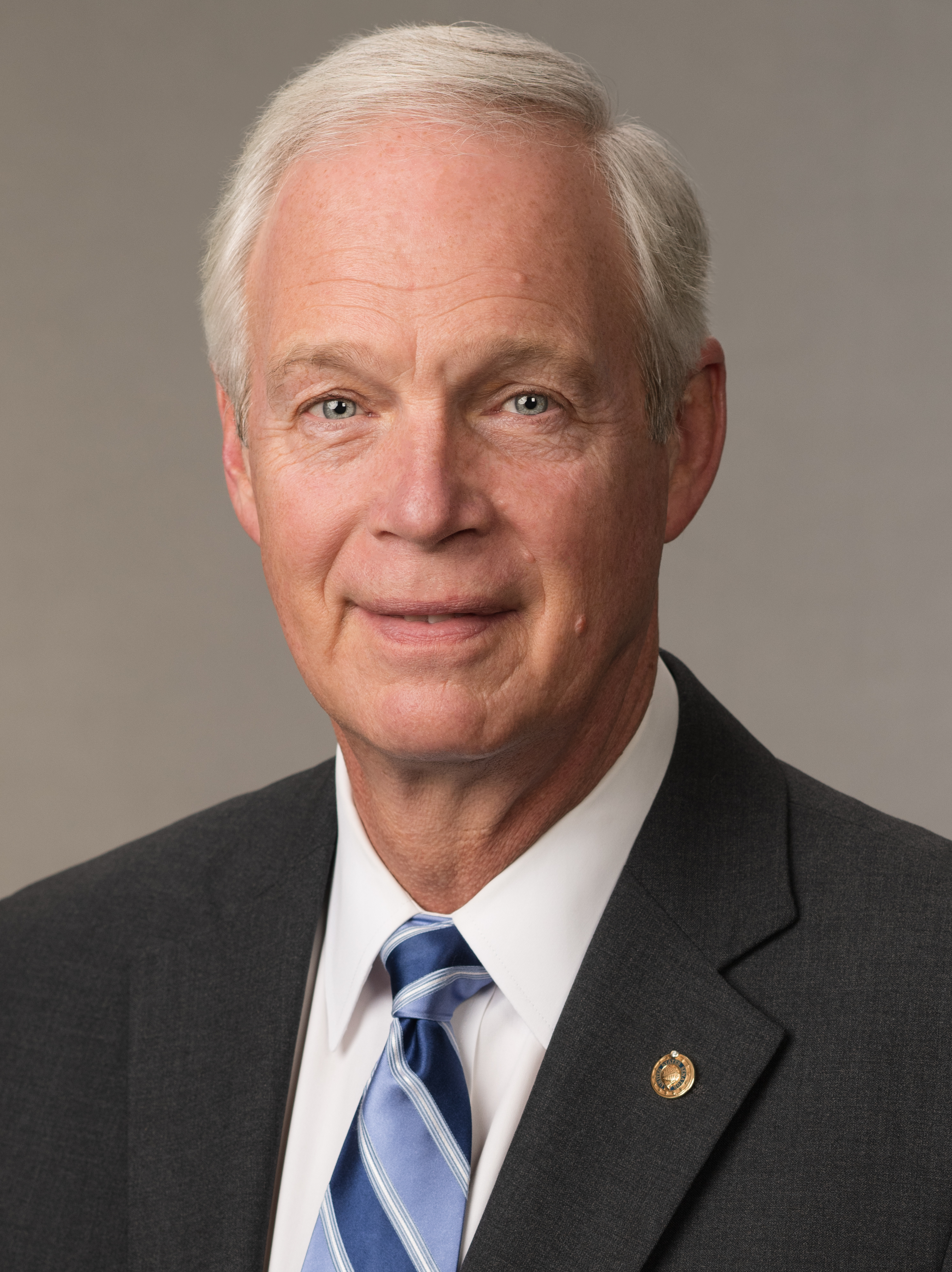

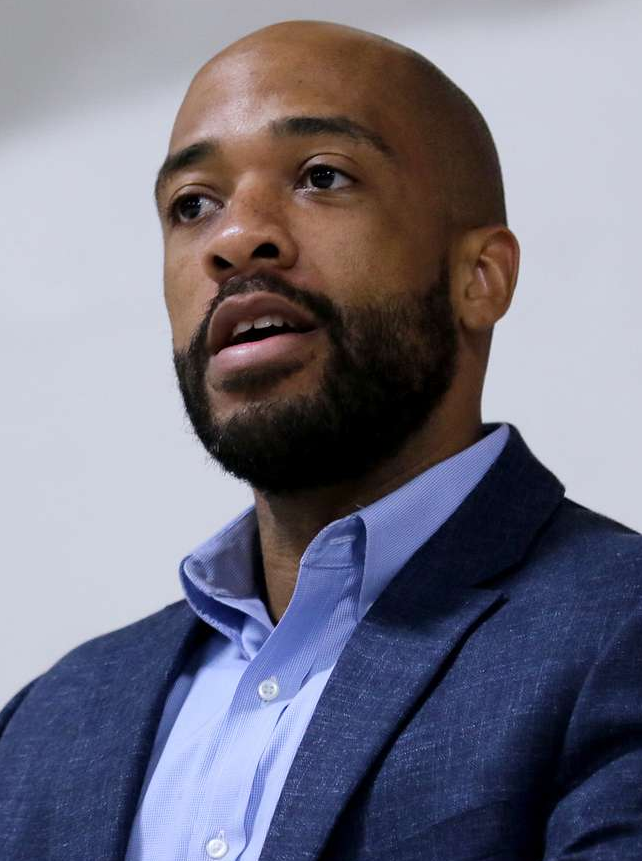
| Nominee | Ron Johnson | Mandela Barnes |
| Party | Republican | Democratic |
| Popular vote | 1,337,185 | 1,310,467 |
| Percentage | 50.4% | 49.4% |
- County results Johnson: 50–60% 60–70% 70–80% Barnes: 50–60% 70–80%
U.S. senator before election
Ron Johnson
Republican
Elected U.S. Senator
Ron Johnson
Republican

Incumbent Republican Senator Ron Johnson won re-election to a third term, defeating the Democratic nominee, Lieutenant Governor Mandela Barnes.

In 2016, Johnson had pledged to serve only two terms in the Senate. He reversed this decision in 2022. The race was one of the most competitive of the cycle, and it followed considerable Democratic success in recent statewide elections. In 2018, Democrats won every statewide contest on the ballot, including the election for the state's other Senate seat. In 2020, Democrat Joe Biden narrowly carried the state in the presidential election.

Wisconsin Republican primary
| Party | Candidate | Votes | % |
|---|---|---|---|
| Republican | Ron Johnson (incumbent) | 563,871 | 83.69 |
| Republican | David Schroeder | 109,917 | 16.31 |
| Total votes | | 673,788 | 100.00 |

Wisconsin Democratic primary
| Party | Candidate | Votes | % |
|---|---|---|---|
| Democratic | Mandela Barnes | 390,279 | 77.81 |
| Democratic | Alex Lasry (withdrawn) | 44,609 | 8.89 |
| Democratic | Sarah Godlewski (withdrawn) | 40,555 | 8.09 |
| Democratic | Tom Nelson (withdrawn) | 10,995 | 2.19 |
| Democratic | Steven Olikara | 5,619 | 1.12 |
| Democratic | Darrell Williams | 3,646 | 0.73 |
| Democratic | Kou Lee | 3,434 | 0.68 |
| Democratic | Peter Peckarsky | 2,446 | 0.49 |
| Total votes | | 501,583 | 100.00 |

Wisconsin general election
| Party | Candidate | Votes | % | ±% |
|---|---|---|---|---|
| Republican | Ron Johnson (incumbent) | 1,337,185 | 50.41% | +0.24 |
| Democratic | Mandela Barnes | 1,310,467 | 49.41% | +2.60 |
| Write-in | | 4,825 | 0.18% | +0.13 |
| Total votes | | 2,652,477 | 100.0% | |
| Republican hold | | | | |
