= Iowa's 41st House of Representatives district =

American legislative district

House District 41
- Type: District of the Lower house
- Location: Iowa
- Representative: Ryan Weldon
- Parent organization: Iowa General Assembly

The 41st District of the Iowa House of Representatives in the state of Iowa is part of Polk County.

== Representatives ==
The district has been represented by:

- Emil J. Husak, 1971–1973
- Norman P. Dunlap, 1973–1975
- Neal Hines, 1975–1979
- Charles Hughes Bruner, 1979–1983
- Thomas H. Fey, 1983–1991
- Matthew Wissing, 1991–1993
- David Millage, 1993–2003
- Paul Bell, 2003–2010
- Daniel Kelley, 2010–2013
- Jo Oldson, 2013–2023
- Molly Buck, 2023–2025
- Ryan Weldon, 2025–present
