= Norman Roorda =

American politician (1928–2012)

Member of the Iowa House of Representatives from the 69th district
- In office January 8, 1973 – January 12, 1975
- Preceded by: Arthur A. Small
- Succeeded by: Robert T. Anderson

Member of the Iowa House of Representatives from the 67th district
- In office January 11, 1971 – January 7, 1973
- Preceded by: Arthur Kitner
- Succeeded by: James T. Caffrey

Member of the Iowa House of Representatives from the 38th district
- In office January 9, 1967 – January 10, 1971
- Preceded by: Wayne J. Fullmer
- Succeeded by: Charles J. Uban

Personal details
- Born: July 23, 1928 Pella, Iowa
- Died: May 27, 2012 (aged 83) Madrid, Iowa
- Party: Republican

Norman Roorda (July 23, 1928 – May 27, 2012) was an American politician who served in the Iowa House of Representatives from 1967 to 1975.

He died on May 27, 2012, in Madrid, Iowa at age 83.
