= Iowa's 29th House of Representatives district =

American legislative district

House District 29
- Type: District of the Lower house
- Location: Iowa
- Representative: Brian Meyer
- Parent organization: Iowa General Assembly

The 29th District of the Iowa House of Representatives in the state of Iowa is part of Polk County.

== Representatives ==
The district has been represented by:

- Dale M. Cochran, 1971–1973
- B. Joseph Rinas, 1973–1979
- Hurley W. Hall, 1979–1983
- Betty Jean Clark, 1983–1991
- Scott L. Krebsbach, 1991–1993
- Deo A. Koenigs, 1993–1999
- Mark Kuhn, 1999–2003
- Ro Foege, 2003–2009
- Nathan Willems, 2009–2013
- Daniel Kelley, 2013–2017
- Wes Breckenridge, 2017–2021
- Jon Dunwell, 2021–2023
- Brian Meyer, 2023-
