= Iowa's 73rd House of Representatives district =

American legislative district

House District 73
- Type: District of the Lower house
- Location: Iowa
- Representative: Elizabeth Wilson
- Parent organization: Iowa General Assembly

The 73rd District of the Iowa House of Representatives in the state of Iowa is part of Linn County.

== Representatives ==
The district has been represented by:

- Chuck Grassley, 1959–1971
- John E. Camp, 1971–1973
- Arthur A. Small, 1973–1979
- Jean Hall Lloyd-Jones, 1979–1983
- Ralph Rosenberg, 1983–1991
- William Bernau, 1991–1993
- Betty Grundberg, 1993–2003
- Jodi Tymeson, 2003–2011
- Julian Garrett, 2011–2013
- Bobby Kaufmann, 2013–2023
- Elizabeth Wilson, 2023–present
