= 1998 United States Senate election in Iowa =

- November 3, 1998
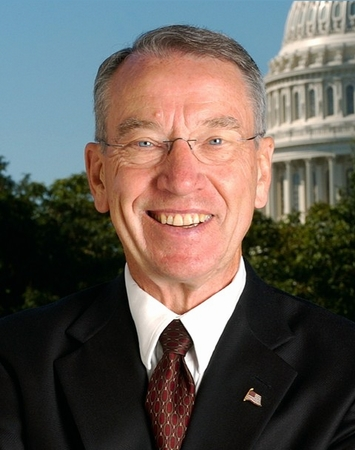

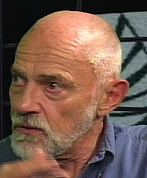
Nominee	Chuck Grassley	David Osterberg
Party	Republican	Democratic
Popular vote	648,480	289,049
Percentage	68.41%	30.49%
- County results Grassley: 50–60% 60–70% 70–80% 80–90% >90%
U.S. senator before election
Chuck Grassley
Republican
Elected U.S. Senator
Chuck Grassley
Republican

The 1998 United States Senate election in Iowa was held November 3, 1998. Republican incumbent Chuck Grassley was re-elected to a fourth term over Democratic former state representative David Osterberg in a landslide.

== Republican primary ==
=== Candidates ===
- Chuck Grassley, incumbent U.S. senator since 1981

=== Results ===
Republican primary results
Party	Candidate	Votes	%
Republican	Chuck Grassley (Incumbent)	149,943	99.72%
Republican	Write-ins	419	0.28%
Total votes		150,362	100.00%

== Democratic primary ==
=== Candidates ===
- David Osterberg, former state representative

=== Results ===
Democratic primary results
Party	Candidate	Votes	%
Democratic	David Osterberg	86,064	99.45%
Democratic	Write-ins	476	0.55%
Total votes		86,540	100.00%

== General election ==
=== Candidates ===
- Chuck Grassley, incumbent U.S. senator since 1981 (Republican)
- Susan Marcus (Natural Law)
- David Osterberg, former state representative (Democratic)
- Margaret Trowe (Socialist Workers)

=== Debate ===
1998 Iowa United States Senate election debate
No.	Date	Host	Moderator	Link	Republican	Democratic
Key: P Participant A Absent N Not invited I Invited W Withdrawn						
Key: P Participant A Absent N Not invited I Invited W Withdrawn					Chuck Grassley	David Osterberg
1	Oct. 19, 1998	Iowa Public Television	Dean Borg	C-SPAN	P	P

=== Polling ===
Poll source	Date(s) administered	Sample size (Note: Key: A – all adults RV – registered voters LV – likely voters V – unclear)	Margin of error	Chuck Grassley (R)	David Osterberg (D)	Other / undecided (Note: Calculated by taking the difference of 100% and all other candidates combined.)
Mason-Dixon Polling & Strategy	October 25–27, 1998	803 (LV)	± 3.5%	68%	24%	8%
Mason-Dixon Polling & Strategy	October 11–13, 1998	809 (LV)	± 3.5%	67%	22%	11%
Mason-Dixon Polling & Strategy	September 12–14, 1998	804 (LV)	± 3.5%	69%	19%	12%
Mason-Dixon Polling & Strategy	July 18–21, 1998	834 (LV)	± 3.5%	68%	17%	15%
Selzer & Company	June 20–24, 1998	581 (LV)	± 4.0%	72%	18%	10%

=== Results ===
United States Senate election in Iowa, 1998
Party	Candidate	Votes	%	±%
Republican	Chuck Grassley (Incumbent)	648,480	68.41%	−1.20%
Democratic	David Osterberg	289,049	30.49%	+3.29%
Natural Law	Susan Marcus	7,561	0.80%	−0.47%
Socialist Workers	Margaret Trowe	2,542	0.27%	+0.16%
Write-ins		275	0.03%	
Majority		359,431	37.92%	−4.50%
Turnout		947,907		
Republican hold		Swing		

== See also ==
- 1998 United States Senate elections
