= Reid Crawford =

Reid Crawford may refer to:

- H. R. Crawford (1939–2017), American real estate developer and politician from Washington, D.C.
- Reid W. Crawford (born 1951), American academic administrator and politician from Iowa
- Reed Crawford (1924–2006), British milliner
