= 2004 United States Senate election in Iowa =

- November 2, 2004
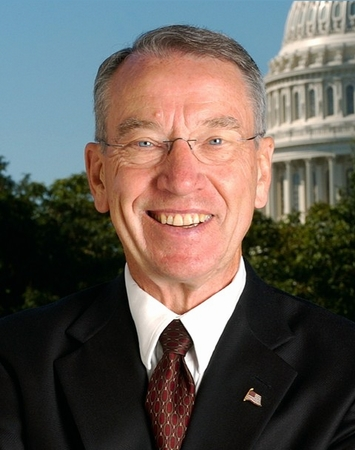

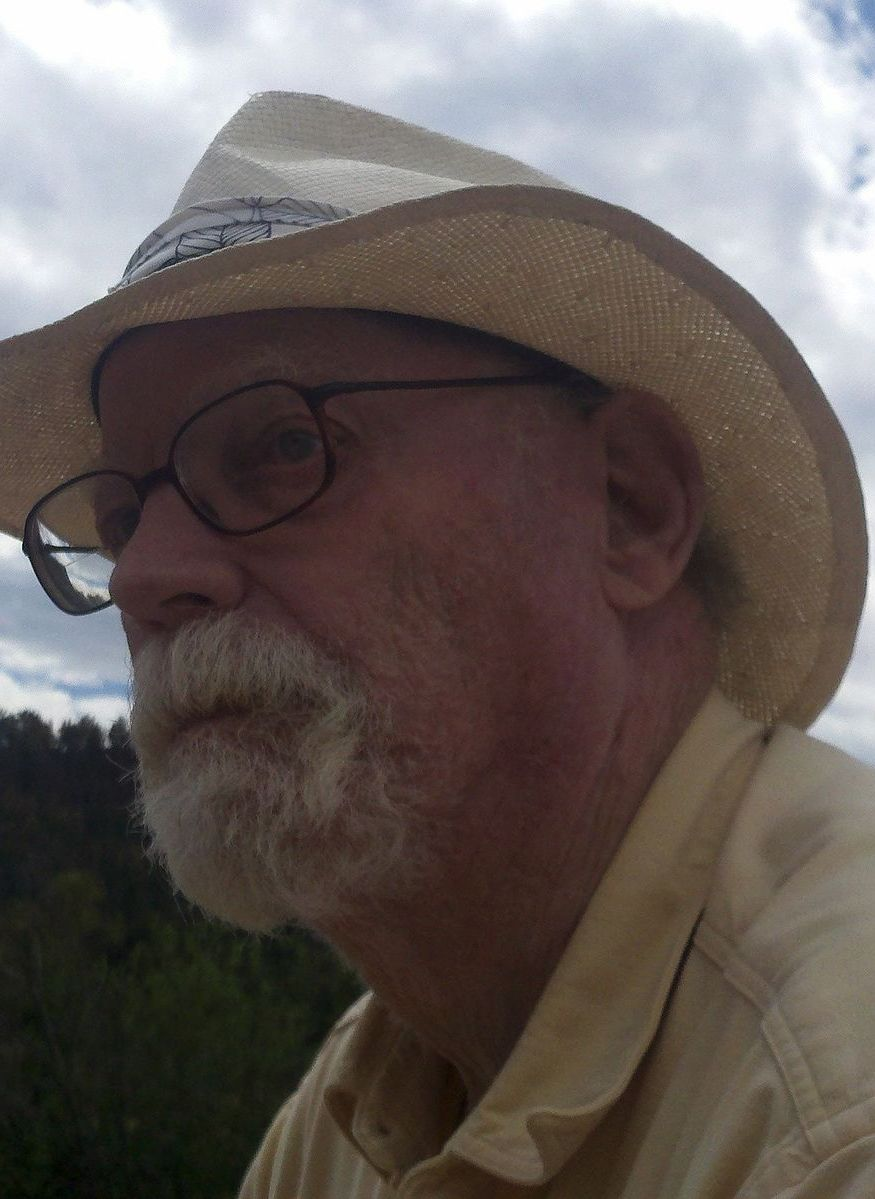
Nominee	Chuck Grassley	Arthur A. Small
Party	Republican	Democratic
Popular vote	1,038,175	412,365
Percentage	70.18%	27.88%
- County results Grassley: 50–60% 60–70% 70–80% 80–90% >90%
U.S. senator before election
Chuck Grassley
Republican
Elected U.S. Senator
Chuck Grassley
Republican

The 2004 United States Senate election in Iowa was held on November 2, 2004. Incumbent Republican Chuck Grassley ran for re-election to a fifth term. Grassley and former State Senator Arthur A. Small won the Republican and Democratic primaries, respectively, unopposed, and faced each other in the general election. Though this election coincided with the highly competitive presidential race, Grassley was not considered vulnerable and defeated Small in a landslide, winning more than 70% of the vote and outperforming Republican President George W. Bush by 41.63% and almost 300,000 votes.

As of 2026, this is the last time a Republican Senate candidate won Johnson County. This is also the last time that the winning U.S. Senate candidate in Iowa carried all 99 counties.

== Democratic primary ==
=== Candidates ===
- Arthur A. Small, attorney, lobbyist, and former Iowa State Senator

=== Results ===
Democratic primary results
Party	Candidate	Votes	%
Democratic	Arthur A. Small	52,318	99.25%
Democratic	Write-ins	398	0.75%
Total votes		52,716	100.00%

== Republican primary ==
=== Candidates ===
- Chuck Grassley, incumbent United States Senator

=== Results ===
Republican primary results
Party	Candidate	Votes	%
Republican	Chuck Grassley (Incumbent)	78,819	99.72%
Republican	Write-ins	218	0.28%
Total votes		79,037	100.00%

== General election ==
=== Predictions ===
Source	Ranking	As of
Sabato's Crystal Ball	Safe R	November 1, 2004

=== Debate ===
2004 Iowa United States Senate election debate
No.	Date	Host	Moderator	Link	Republican	Democratic
Key: P Participant A Absent N Not invited I Invited W Withdrawn						
Key: P Participant A Absent N Not invited I Invited W Withdrawn					Chuck Grassley	Arthur A. Small
1	Oct. 22, 2004	Iowa Public Television	Dean Borg	C-SPAN	P	P

=== Results ===
United States Senate election in Iowa, 2004
Party	Candidate	Votes	%	±%
Republican	Chuck Grassley (Incumbent)	1,038,175	70.18%	+1.77%
Democratic	Arthur A. Small	412,365	27.88%	−2.62%
Libertarian	Christy Ann Welty	15,218	1.03%	
Green	Daryl A. Northrop	11,121	0.75%	
Socialist Workers	Edwin Fruit	1,874	0.13%	−0.14%
Write-ins		475	0.03%	
Majority		625,810	42.31%	+4.39%
Turnout		1,479,228		
Republican hold		Swing		

== See also ==
- 2004 United States Senate elections
