= Winnebago County Courthouse =

Winnebago County Courthouse may refer to:

- Winnebago County Courthouse (Iowa), Forest City, Iowa
- Winnebago County Courthouse (Wisconsin), Oshkosh, Wisconsin, listed on the National Register of Historic Places
