= Matthew Olson (disambiguation) =

Matthew Olson is an American soccer player and coach

Matthew Olsen or Matthew Olson could refer to:

- Matthew G. Olsen (born 1962), American prosecutor and the former Director of the National Counterterrorism Center
- Matt Olsen (born 1975), an actor best known as the voice of Bentley from the Sly Cooper game series
- Matt Olson (born 1994), American professional baseball player
- Matthew Oleson, American politician
