= 2004 United States presidential election in Iowa =

- November 2, 2004

Nominee	George W. Bush	John Kerry
Party	Republican	Democratic
Home state	Texas	Massachusetts
Running mate	Dick Cheney	John Edwards
Electoral vote	7	0
Popular vote	751,957	741,898
Percentage	49.90%	49.23%

Bush
40–50%
50–60%
60–70%
70–80%
80–90%
Kerry
40–50%
50–60%
60–70%
President before election
George W. Bush
Republican
Elected President
George W. Bush
Republican

The 2004 United States presidential election in Iowa took place on November 2, 2004, as part of the 2004 United States presidential election in which all 50 states plus the District of Columbia participated. Voters chose seven electors to represent them in the Electoral College via a popular vote pitting incumbent Republican President George W. Bush and his running mate, Vice President Dick Cheney, against Democratic challenger and Senator from Massachusetts John F. Kerry and his running mate, Senator from North Carolina John Edwards. Six third parties were also on the ballot.

Iowa was won by President George W. Bush by a 0.67% margin of victory, or 10,059 votes, despite losing the state to Al Gore four years earlier. Prior to the election, most news organizations considered this a swing state. The Democrats had won Iowa in the previous four presidential elections, though only narrowly in 2000, when Gore had won the state by only 0.32%, or 4,144 votes, a much weaker margin compared to the prior three elections. In 1988, Democrat Michael Dukakis won the state by 10.21% even in an otherwise Republican landslide year, and Bill Clinton carried the state by 6.02% in 1992 and 10.34% in 1996. Iowa was one of just two states, along with New Mexico, to vote for Gore in 2000 but flip to Bush in 2004, although it was won both times by less than 1%. Iowa was one of two states to be won by George W. Bush in at least one of his presidential runs that his father George H. W. Bush never carried, the other being West Virginia. Bush became the first Republican to win Iowa since Ronald Reagan had done so in 1984.

As of the 2024 presidential election, this is the last time any candidate won Iowa by only a plurality and/or by a less than 1% margin. Until 2020, this was also the last time Iowa did not vote for the same candidate as neighboring Wisconsin. This election marked a new streak of Iowa voting for the winning ticket in every election along with Florida and Ohio until 2020, when all three voted for the losing candidate.

Bush is also the only U.S. president to win the White House without Iowa and then carry it upon winning re-election. This is the opposite of Woodrow Wilson and FDR, the only two presidents to have carried Iowa upon winning office but lost it upon winning re-election. (Note: FDR won Iowa in 1932 and 1936, but lost it in 1940 and 1944.)

== Caucuses ==
- 2004 Iowa Democratic presidential caucuses

== Campaign ==
=== Predictions ===
There were 12 news organizations who made state-by-state predictions of the election. Here are their last predictions before election day.

Source	Ranking
D.C. Political Report	Lean D
Associated Press	Toss-up
CNN	Likely R (flip)
Cook Political Report	Toss-up
Newsweek	Lean R (flip)
New York Times	Lean R (flip)
Rasmussen Reports	Toss-up
Research 2000	Lean D
Washington Post	Toss-up
Washington Times	Toss-up
Zogby International	Likely D
Washington Dispatch	Likely D

=== Polling ===
Polls showed the state was a pure tossup with neither candidate reaching a consistent lead. The last three polls averaged both candidates at 48%, with the last-second deciders the key to victory. The final RealClearPolitics average gave Bush leading with a margin of 0.3%, with 47.4% to Kerry at 47.1% and Nader at 1.0%.

=== Fundraising ===
Bush raised $671,335. Kerry raised $449,980.

=== Advertising and visits ===
The Kerry campaign visited the state 11 times to Bush's 10 times. Both campaigns spent between $400,000 to $600,000 each week in television advertising.

== Analysis ==
Kerry's strength in the state lay in the highly populated counties of Polk (Des Moines), Linn (Cedar Rapids), Scott (Davenport), Johnson (Iowa City), and Black Hawk (Waterloo). Johnson County, home to the University of Iowa, gave Kerry 64.01% of its vote, Kerry's best performance in the state. However, Kerry also did well in a series of rural and small-town counties in northeastern Iowa and along the Mississippi River, many of which had been traditionally Democratic since at least the 1980s. He won eight of the ten counties along the Mississippi River, including Dubuque County, which had given Gore his margin in the state in 2000. The 1st and 2nd congressional districts were both carried by Kerry, despite being represented by Republicans in Congress. Dubuque is located within the 1st district while the 2nd district contains Cedar Rapids, Iowa City, and Muscatine.

However, Bush performed respectably even in areas of Democratic strength; in only two counties did he obtain less than 40% of the vote. Additionally, he was able to offset Kerry's strength in the population centers and in the northeast and Mississippi River counties with landslide margins in a series of rural counties in the west of the state, as well as by dominating the state's south. Bush's best performance in the state was in Sioux County, where he won with 85.87% of the vote. His raw vote margin in Sioux County of 11,970 votes alone was greater than his raw vote margin over Kerry statewide. Bush won three congressional districts in the state: the 3rd district, home to the Democratic city of Des Moines and its Republican suburbs, gave Bush a razor thin 50–50 margin, despite re-electing Democrat Leonard Boswell to Congress. The 4th district also gave Bush a narrow margin, giving him 51% of the vote. The now obsolete 5th district in the western part of the state was home to Iowa's most Republican areas, having elected Steve King to Congress in 2002; it gave Bush a landslide 21-point margin.

In terms of counties carried, both candidates flipped counties. Bush flipped four that voted for Gore in 2000, while Kerry flipped five that voted for Bush in 2000. This election coincided with the 2004 United States Senate election in Iowa, where Republican Chuck Grassley was effortlessly re-elected with 70.83% of the vote.

Iowa would return to the Democratic column in the next two elections, voting for Barack Obama by 9.54% in 2008 and 5.81% in 2012. However, it would return to the Republican column since then when Donald Trump won the state by 9.41% in 2016 and 8.30% in 2020. In 2024, Trump won the state by 13.21%, the largest margin of victory for a Republican presidential nominee in the state since Ronald Reagan's in 1980.

== Results ==
2004 United States presidential election in Iowa
Party	Candidate	Running mate	Votes	Percentage	Electoral votes
Republican	George W. Bush (incumbent)	Richard Cheney (incumbent)	751,957	49.90%	7
Democratic	John Kerry	John Edwards	741,898	49.23%	0
Independent	Ralph Nader	Peter Camejo	5,973	0.40%	0
Libertarian	Michael Badnarik	Richard Campagna	2,992	0.20%	0
Constitution	Michael Peroutka	Chuck Baldwin	1,304	0.09%	0
Green	David Cobb	Pat LaMarche	1,141	0.08%	0
N/A	Write-ins	–	1,094	0.07%	0
Socialist Workers	James Harris	Margaret Trowe	373	0.02%	0
Socialist Equality	Bill Van Auken	Jim Lawrence	176	0.01%	0
Totals			1,506,908	100%	7
Voter Turnout (Voting age/Registered)					67%/76%

=== By county ===
County	George W. Bush Republican		John Kerry Democratic		Various candidates Other parties		Margin		Total
County	#	%	#	%	#	%	#	%	Total
Adair	2,402	56.15%	1,844	43.10%	32	0.75%	558	13.05%	4,278
Adams	1,317	56.65%	977	42.02%	31	1.33%	340	14.63%	2,325
Allamakee	3,530	49.99%	3,449	48.84%	83	1.18%	81	1.15%	7,062
Appanoose	3,340	51.78%	3,063	47.49%	47	0.73%	277	4.29%	6,450
Audubon	1,958	54.51%	1,608	44.77%	26	0.73%	350	9.74%	3,592
Benton	6,658	49.31%	6,747	49.97%	96	0.72%	-89	-0.66%	13,501
Black Hawk	28,046	43.89%	35,392	55.38%	469	0.73%	-7,346	-11.49%	63,907
Boone	6,870	49.04%	7,027	50.16%	112	0.80%	-157	-1.12%	14,009
Bremer	6,665	52.16%	6,025	47.15%	89	0.70%	640	5.01%	12,779
Buchanan	4,797	45.79%	5,608	53.54%	70	0.67%	-811	-7.75%	10,475
Buena Vista	4,887	57.56%	3,520	41.46%	83	0.98%	1,367	16.10%	8,490
Butler	4,417	59.09%	3,001	40.15%	57	0.76%	1,416	18.94%	7,475
Calhoun	3,255	58.73%	2,243	40.47%	44	0.80%	1,012	18.26%	5,542
Carroll	5,762	54.75%	4,689	44.56%	73	0.69%	1,073	10.19%	10,524
Cass	4,796	63.58%	2,679	35.52%	68	0.90%	2,117	28.06%	7,543
Cedar	4,869	50.23%	4,747	48.97%	78	0.80%	122	1.26%	9,694
Cerro Gordo	10,960	44.71%	13,372	54.54%	184	0.75%	-2,412	-9.83%	24,516
Cherokee	3,758	55.30%	2,988	43.97%	50	0.73%	770	11.33%	6,796
Chickasaw	3,040	44.67%	3,708	54.48%	58	0.86%	-668	-9.81%	6,806
Clarke	2,200	48.18%	2,323	50.88%	43	0.94%	-123	-2.70%	4,566
Clay	4,898	57.03%	3,547	41.30%	143	1.67%	1,351	15.73%	8,588
Clayton	4,312	47.03%	4,736	51.66%	120	1.31%	-424	-4.63%	9,168
Clinton	10,666	43.21%	13,813	55.96%	205	0.83%	-3,147	-12.75%	24,684
Crawford	3,955	54.61%	3,220	44.46%	67	0.92%	735	10.15%	7,242
Dallas	15,183	57.75%	10,917	41.52%	193	0.74%	4,266	16.23%	26,293
Davis	2,148	54.82%	1,731	44.18%	39	1.00%	417	10.64%	3,918
Decatur	2,088	52.06%	1,859	46.35%	64	1.59%	229	5.71%	4,011
Delaware	4,908	53.35%	4,227	45.95%	65	0.71%	681	7.40%	9,200
Des Moines	8,221	39.38%	12,456	59.67%	197	0.94%	-4,235	-20.29%	20,874
Dickinson	5,337	55.87%	4,140	43.34%	76	0.80%	1,197	12.53%	9,553
Dubuque	20,100	42.73%	26,561	56.46%	382	0.81%	-6,461	-13.73%	47,043
Emmet	2,697	52.31%	2,405	46.64%	54	1.04%	292	5.67%	5,156
Fayette	5,128	49.35%	5,185	49.89%	79	0.76%	-57	-0.54%	10,392
Floyd	3,745	45.86%	4,349	53.25%	73	0.89%	-604	-7.39%	8,167
Franklin	3,128	56.66%	2,340	42.38%	53	0.96%	788	14.28%	5,521
Fremont	2,362	60.39%	1,510	38.61%	39	1.00%	852	21.78%	3,911
Greene	2,618	51.20%	2,459	48.09%	36	0.70%	159	3.11%	5,113
Grundy	4,429	64.67%	2,386	34.84%	34	0.50%	2,043	29.83%	6,849
Guthrie	3,325	55.47%	2,614	43.61%	55	0.92%	711	11.86%	5,994
Hamilton	4,367	52.39%	3,895	46.73%	73	0.88%	472	5.66%	8,335
Hancock	3,368	57.04%	2,484	42.07%	53	0.89%	884	14.97%	5,905
Hardin	4,875	54.48%	4,015	44.87%	59	0.66%	860	9.61%	8,949
Harrison	4,680	60.94%	2,906	37.84%	94	1.23%	1,774	23.10%	7,680
Henry	5,220	55.20%	4,127	43.64%	110	1.16%	1,093	11.56%	9,457
Howard	2,028	43.18%	2,614	55.65%	55	1.17%	-586	-12.47%	4,697
Humboldt	3,162	59.10%	2,146	40.11%	42	0.79%	1,016	18.99%	5,350
Ida	2,342	62.06%	1,415	37.49%	17	0.45%	927	24.57%	3,774
Iowa	4,544	53.75%	3,841	45.43%	69	0.82%	703	8.32%	8,454
Jackson	4,242	42.37%	5,656	56.50%	113	1.13%	-1,414	-14.13%	10,011
Jasper	9,462	47.16%	10,430	51.99%	170	0.84%	-968	-4.83%	20,062
Jefferson	3,648	44.05%	4,490	54.22%	143	1.73%	-842	-10.17%	8,281
Johnson	22,715	34.75%	41,847	64.01%	811	1.24%	-19,132	-29.26%	65,373
Jones	4,834	48.45%	5,054	50.65%	90	0.90%	-220	-2.20%	9,978
Keokuk	3,119	56.92%	2,294	41.86%	67	1.22%	825	15.06%	5,480
Kossuth	5,042	54.46%	4,132	44.63%	84	0.91%	910	9.83%	9,258
Lee	7,472	41.84%	10,152	56.85%	234	1.32%	-2,680	-15.01%	17,858
Linn	49,442	44.65%	60,442	54.58%	856	0.77%	-11,000	-9.93%	110,740
Louisa	2,572	52.32%	2,297	46.72%	47	0.96%	275	5.60%	4,916
Lucas	2,543	55.63%	1,987	43.47%	41	0.90%	556	12.16%	4,571
Lyon	4,751	77.87%	1,303	21.36%	47	0.77%	3,448	56.51%	6,101
Madison	4,538	56.70%	3,380	42.23%	86	1.07%	1,158	14.47%	8,004
Mahaska	6,858	63.93%	3,790	35.33%	80	0.74%	3,068	28.60%	10,728
Marion	9,990	59.83%	6,574	39.37%	132	0.79%	3,416	20.46%	16,696
Marshall	9,557	49.87%	9,443	49.27%	164	0.85%	114	0.60%	19,164
Mills	4,556	65.65%	2,308	33.26%	76	1.10%	2,248	32.39%	6,940
Mitchell	2,646	48.28%	2,785	50.82%	49	0.90%	-139	-2.54%	5,480
Monona	2,575	51.32%	2,397	47.77%	46	0.92%	178	3.55%	5,018
Monroe	2,067	52.16%	1,855	46.81%	41	1.03%	212	5.35%	3,963
Montgomery	3,601	64.81%	1,899	34.18%	56	1.01%	1,702	30.63%	5,556
Muscatine	9,020	48.19%	9,542	50.98%	155	0.83%	-522	-2.79%	18,717
O'Brien	5,328	68.92%	2,330	30.14%	73	0.95%	2,998	38.78%	7,731
Osceola	2,295	70.27%	934	28.60%	37	1.14%	1,361	41.67%	3,266
Page	5,243	69.79%	2,211	29.43%	59	0.78%	3,032	40.36%	7,513
Palo Alto	2,674	51.51%	2,482	47.81%	35	0.68%	192	3.70%	5,191
Plymouth	7,810	63.90%	4,278	35.00%	134	1.09%	3,532	28.90%	12,222
Pocahontas	2,441	56.60%	1,822	42.24%	50	1.16%	619	14.36%	4,313
Polk	95,828	47.29%	105,218	51.93%	1,572	0.77%	-9,390	-4.64%	202,618
Pottawattamie	24,558	58.72%	16,906	40.43%	356	0.85%	7,652	18.29%	41,820
Poweshiek	4,965	49.20%	5,043	49.98%	83	0.83%	-78	-0.78%	10,091
Ringgold	1,466	52.77%	1,286	46.29%	26	0.93%	180	6.48%	2,778
Sac	3,128	58.21%	2,215	41.22%	31	0.57%	913	16.99%	5,374
Scott	39,958	48.30%	42,122	50.92%	642	0.77%	-2,164	-2.62%	82,722
Shelby	4,256	63.81%	2,355	35.31%	59	0.88%	1,901	28.50%	6,670
Sioux	14,229	85.87%	2,259	13.63%	82	0.49%	11,970	72.24%	16,570
Story	20,819	46.63%	23,296	52.17%	537	1.20%	-2,477	-5.54%	44,652
Tama	4,456	49.51%	4,487	49.85%	58	0.65%	-31	-0.34%	9,001
Taylor	1,908	59.81%	1,252	39.25%	30	0.93%	656	20.56%	3,190
Union	3,165	52.94%	2,747	45.95%	66	1.10%	418	6.99%	5,978
Van Buren	2,211	57.64%	1,568	40.88%	57	1.48%	643	16.76%	3,836
Wapello	7,403	44.31%	9,125	54.62%	179	1.07%	-1,722	-10.31%	16,707
Warren	12,160	52.75%	10,730	46.54%	163	0.70%	1,430	6.21%	23,053
Washington	5,977	55.92%	4,595	42.99%	116	1.08%	1,382	12.93%	10,688
Wayne	1,733	55.31%	1,379	44.02%	21	0.67%	354	11.29%	3,133
Webster	8,959	48.09%	9,561	51.32%	111	0.60%	-602	-3.23%	18,631
Winnebago	3,175	53.34%	2,707	45.48%	70	1.17%	468	7.86%	5,952
Winneshiek	5,324	49.37%	5,354	49.65%	106	0.98%	-30	-0.28%	10,784
Woodbury	22,451	50.80%	21,455	48.55%	289	0.66%	996	2.25%	44,195
Worth	1,795	43.54%	2,286	55.45%	42	1.01%	-491	-11.91%	4,123
Wright	3,631	54.99%	2,930	44.37%	42	0.63%	701	10.62%	6,603
Totals	751,957	49.90%	741,898	49.23%	13,053	0.87%	10,059	0.67%	1,506,908

==== Counties that flipped from Democratic to Republican ====
- Cedar (largest city: Tipton)
- Greene (largest city: Jefferson)
- Louisa (largest city: Wapello)
- Winnebago (largest city: Forest City)

==== Counties that flipped from Republican to Democratic ====
- Fayette (largest city: Oelwein)
- Jasper (largest city: Newton)
- Jefferson (largest city: Fairfield)
- Poweshiek (largest city: Grinnell)
- Winneshiek (largest city: Decorah)

=== By congressional district ===
Bush won three of five congressional districts, including one held by a Democrat. Kerry won two held by Republicans.

District	Bush	Kerry	Representative
1st	46%	53%	Jim Nussle
2nd	44%	55%	Jim Leach
3rd	49.7%	49.6%	Leonard Boswell
4th	51%	48%	Tom Latham
5th	60%	39%	Steve King

== Electors ==
Iowa voters cast their ballots for electors: representatives to the Electoral College. Iowa has seven electors because it has five congressional districts and two senators. All candidates who appear on the ballot or qualify to receive write-in votes must submit a list of seven electors, who pledge to vote for their candidate and their running mate. Whoever wins the majority of votes in the state is awarded all seven electoral votes. Their chosen electors then vote for president and vice president. Although electors are pledged to their candidate and running mate, they are not obligated to vote for them. An elector who votes for someone other than his or her candidate is known as a faithless elector.

The electors of each state and the District of Columbia met on December 13, 2004, to cast their votes for president and vice president. The Electoral College itself never meets as one body. Instead, the electors from each state and the District of Columbia meet in their respective capitols.

The following were the members of the Electoral College from Iowa. All were pledged to and voted for Bush and Cheney.

1. Julie Hosch
2. Velma Huebner
3. Don Racheter
4. Marilyn Bose
5. Don Kass
6. Dorothy Schlitter
7. Wanda Sears

== See also ==
- United States presidential elections in Iowa
