= Larry N. Larson =

American politician

Larry N. Larson (December 29, 1935 – October 22, 2025) was an American politician.

Larry Larson was born in Spring Valley, Minnesota, to parents Guy and Esther Larson on 29 December 1935. He attended Hampton Grade School, and graduated from Ames High School in Ames, Iowa, in 1954. Larson then was a student at Iowa State University for the next four years, where he completed a bachelor's degree. Following his college graduation, Larson served in the United States Army for three years. In 1961, Larson opened a grocery store. He won election to the Iowa House of Representatives in 1970, and was seated as a Democratic legislator from District 34. Larson contested the 1972 and 1974 elections as a Democratic candidate for District 42, losing both times to Reid W. Crawford.
