= Charles Hughes Bruner =

American politician (born 1948)

Member of the Iowa Senate from the 37th district
- In office 1983–1989
- Preceded by: Arthur A. Small
- Succeeded by: Ralph Rosenberg

Member of the Iowa House of Representatives from the 41st district
- In office 1979–1981
- Preceded by: Neal Hines
- Succeeded by: Thomas H. Fey

Personal details
- Born: April 26, 1948 (age 78) Ames, Iowa, US
- Parent: Charlotte H. Bruner (mother)
- Education: Macalester College (1970; MA); Stanford University (1978; PhD, political science)
- Occupation: Politician, academic

Charles Hughes Bruner (born April 26, 1948) was an American politician who served as a Democrat in the Iowa Senate and Iowa House of Representatives.

== Biography ==
Bruner was born April 26, 1948, in Ames, Iowa to David and Charlotte H. Bruner, a scholar. In 1966, he graduated from Ames High School. He attended Macalester College, graduating in 1970 with a Master of Arts. He also attended Stanford University, graduating in 1978 with a Doctor of Philosophy in political science. He was a visiting professor for Iowa State University.

A Democrat, Bruner was elected member of the Iowa House of Representatives from the 41st district, serving one term, between 1979 and 1981. He was elected into the Iowa Senate, serving two terms, between 1983 and 1989. He retired in 1990. In 1992, he was the recipient of the Cristine Wilson Medal for Equality and Justice.
