= Roorda =

Roorda is a surname. Notable people with the surname include:

- Bas Roorda (born 1973), Dutch footballer
- Gerrit Roorda (1890–1977), Dutch politician
- Geert Arend Roorda (born 1988), Dutch footballer
- Jeff Roorda (born 1965), American politician
- Noëlle Roorda, Dutch Paralympic athlete
- Norman Roorda (1928–2012), American politician
- Stephanie Roorda (born 1986), Canadian racing cyclist
