= Jon Dunwell =

American politician

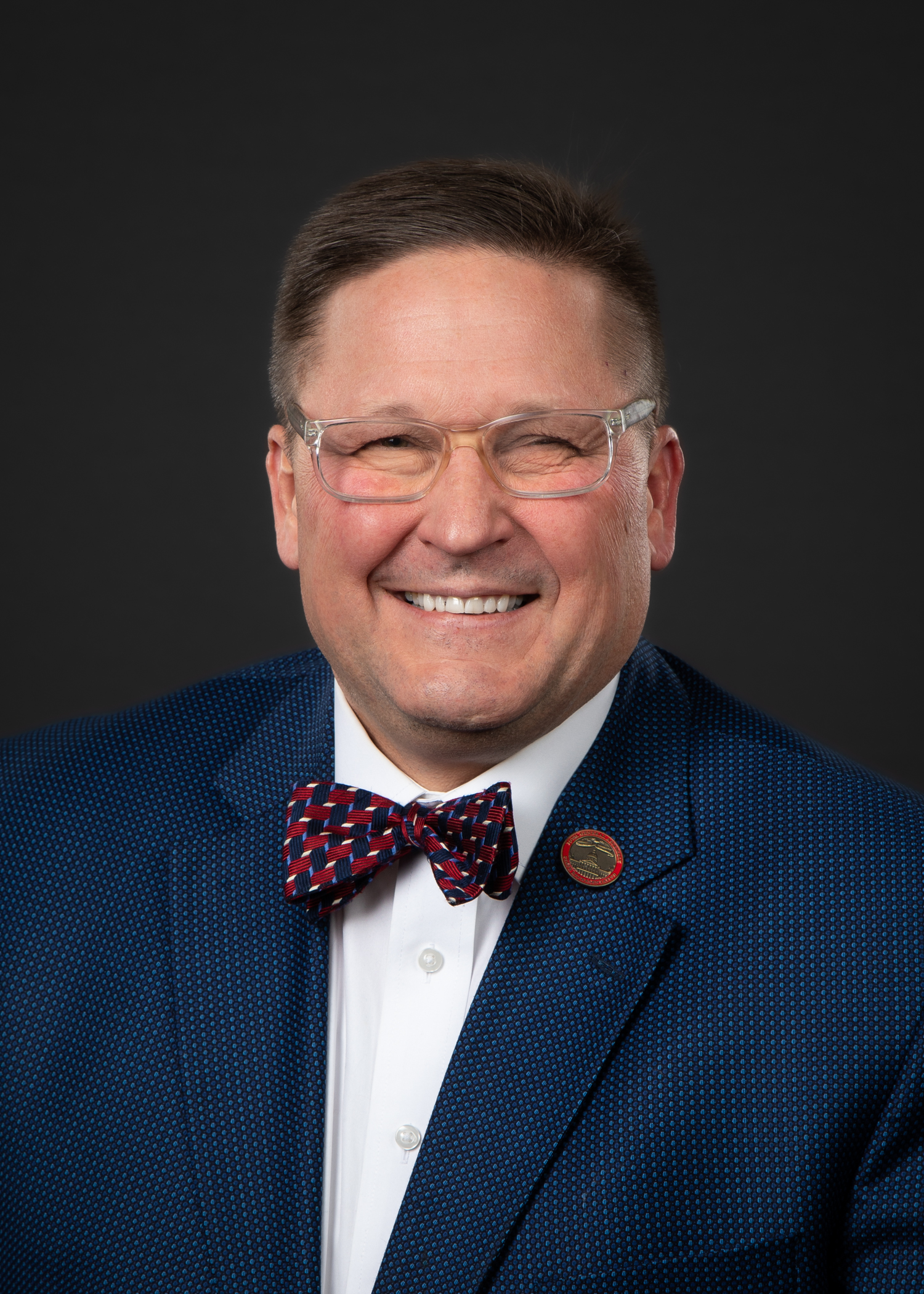
- Official portrait, 2023

Member of the Iowa House of Representatives
- In office October 12, 2021 – October 5, 2026
- Preceded by: Wes Breckenridge
- Succeeded by: Matthew Oleson (elect)
- Constituency: 29th district (2021–2023); 38th district (2023–2026)

Personal details
- Born: 1966 (age 59–60) St. Cloud, Minnesota, U.S.
- Party: Republican
- Spouse: Christie (m. 1990)
- Children: 2
- Website: Campaign website; Representative Jon Dunwell

Jon Dunwell is an American politician who served as a member of the Iowa House of Representatives from the 38th district.

In October 2021, Dunwell was elected in a special election to succeed Wes Breckenridge. Dunwell's win on October 12, 2021, over Newton City Councilman Steve Mullan flipped the 29th Iowa House district seat to Republican from Democrat in the special election.

== Career ==
Prior to entering politics, Dunwell worked as a pastor in Orlando, Florida and Minnesota. He also worked as the vice president of two financial services firms. He later relocated to his wife's hometown of Newton, Iowa.

Dunwell was elected to the Iowa House of Representatives in an October 2021 special election, succeeding Wes Breckenridge in the 29th district. Dunwell announced his upcoming retirement at the end of the 2026 Legislative session, and gave his retirement speech at the Iowa House of Representatives on April 7. He later resigned from the chamber on October 5 after being appointed to a seat on the Iowa Utilities Commission.

=== Committee assignments ===
Dunwell served on the following committees in the Iowa House.

- Administration and Rules (vice chair)
- Agriculture
- Judiciary
- State Government
- Economic Development Appropriations Subcommittee
- International Relations Committee

== Personal life ==
Dunwell was born in 1966 in St. Cloud, Minnesota and was raised in Shakopee. He attended Bethany Global University and Crown College (Minnesota). Dunwell married his wife, Christie, on August 4, 1990. Together, they have two sons. He is the Director of outreach and engagement at the Family Leader and pastor of Gateway Church Monroe.

Iowa House of Representatives
Preceded by Garrett Gobble	38th District; 2023 – 2026	Succeeded by Vacant
Preceded by Wes Breckenridge	29th District; 2021 – 2023	Succeeded by Brian Meyer
