= Charlotte H. Bruner =

American scholar (1917–1999)

- Born: Charlotte Hughes Johnston; May 8, 1917; Urbana, Illinois, U.S.
- Died: December 4, 1999 (aged 82)
- Education: University Laboratory High School; University of Illinois; Columbia University
- Occupation: Scholar
- Known for: Specialist in African women writers
- Honors: Iowa Women's Hall of Fame

Charlotte Hughes Bruner (née Johnston; May 8, 1917 – December 4, 1999) was an American scholar who was one of the first in the United States to write extensively about, and translate the work of, African women writers. She was inducted into the Iowa Women's Hall of Fame in 1997.

== Biography ==
Bruner was born on May 8, 1917, in Urbana, Illinois, to Charles Hughes Johnston and Nell Converse (née Bomar) Johnston. She graduated from University Laboratory High School in 1934. She received her undergraduate education at the University of Illinois (B.A., 1938) and her M.A. degree from Columbia University in 1939. That same year, she married David Kincaid Bruner, who would become a faculty member in the Department of English and Speech at Iowa State College (which later became Iowa State University). They had two children, Nell and Charles.

Bruner joined the Department of Foreign Languages and Literatures as a professor of French at Iowa State College in 1954 and retired from the university in 1987 after more than three decades of teaching and research. As a scholar, she dedicated her career to writing about and publishing translations of literature by African women, helping to create a wider public for these writers. She edited two volumes of short stories by African women: The Heinemann Book of African Women's Writings (1993) and Unwinding Threads (1994), and was one of several editors for The Feminist Companion to Literature in English (1990). She has been called an outstanding pioneer in the fields of both African studies and world literature, pursuing her studies at a time when American academics were largely uninterested in African literature and taught mainly European classics.

In the early 1970s, Bruner and her husband David spent a year in Africa interviewing African writers, and on their return three dozen of their interviews were aired as a series of radio programs entitled Talking Sticks. From 1980 to 1986, Bruner cohosted (with David) a weekly series of radio programs, First Person Feminine, in which she read from and discussed international women's literature.

Bruner served as vice-president of the African Literature Association.

Bruner was inducted into the Iowa Women's Hall of Fame in 1997, two years before her death on December 4, 1999, aged 82. Her name is inscribed in the university's Plaza of Heroines.

== Selected publications ==
=== Books ===
- Editor, Unwinding Threads: Writing by Women in Africa (Heinemann African Writers Series, 1983. New edition, 1994)
- Editor, The Heinemann Book of African Women's Writings (Heinemann African Writers Series, 1993, ISBN 978-0435906733)

=== Articles ===
- "Black French Literature in the Classroom", The French Review, Vol. 46, No. 1 (October 1972), pp. 52–58.
- "The Meaning of Caliban in Black Literature Today", Comparative Literature Studies, Vol. 13, No. 3 (September 1976), pp. 240–253.
- "Child Africa as Depicted by Bessie Head and Ama Ata Aidoo", Studies in the Humanities 7, no. 2 (September 1979), pp. 5–11.
- "A Caribbean Madness, Half Slave and Half Free", Canadian Review of Comparative Literature (June 1984). 11. pp. 236–248.
- "Women Viewed and Women Viewers in African Literature" (1989), Africa Today, Volume 37, Issue 1, pp. 69–70.
- "Cross-Cultural Marriage as a Literary Motif in African and Caribbean Literature" (1994).
