= Neal Hines =

American politician (1950–2019)

Member of the Iowa House of Representatives from the 41st district
- In office January 13, 1975 – January 7, 1979
- Preceded by: Norman P. Dunlap
- Succeeded by: Charles Hughes Bruner

Member of the South Dakota House of Representatives
- In office 1989–1990

Personal details
- Born: August 30, 1950 Nevada, Iowa, US
- Died: July 7, 2019 (aged 68) Ames, Iowa, US
- Party: Democratic

Neal Edward Hines (August 30, 1950 – July 7, 2019) was an American politician who served in the Iowa House of Representatives from the 41st district from 1975 to 1979. He also served in the South Dakota House of Representatives from 1989 to 1990.

He died on July 7, 2019, in Ames, Iowa at age 68.
