= 1992 United States Senate election in Iowa =

- November 3, 1992
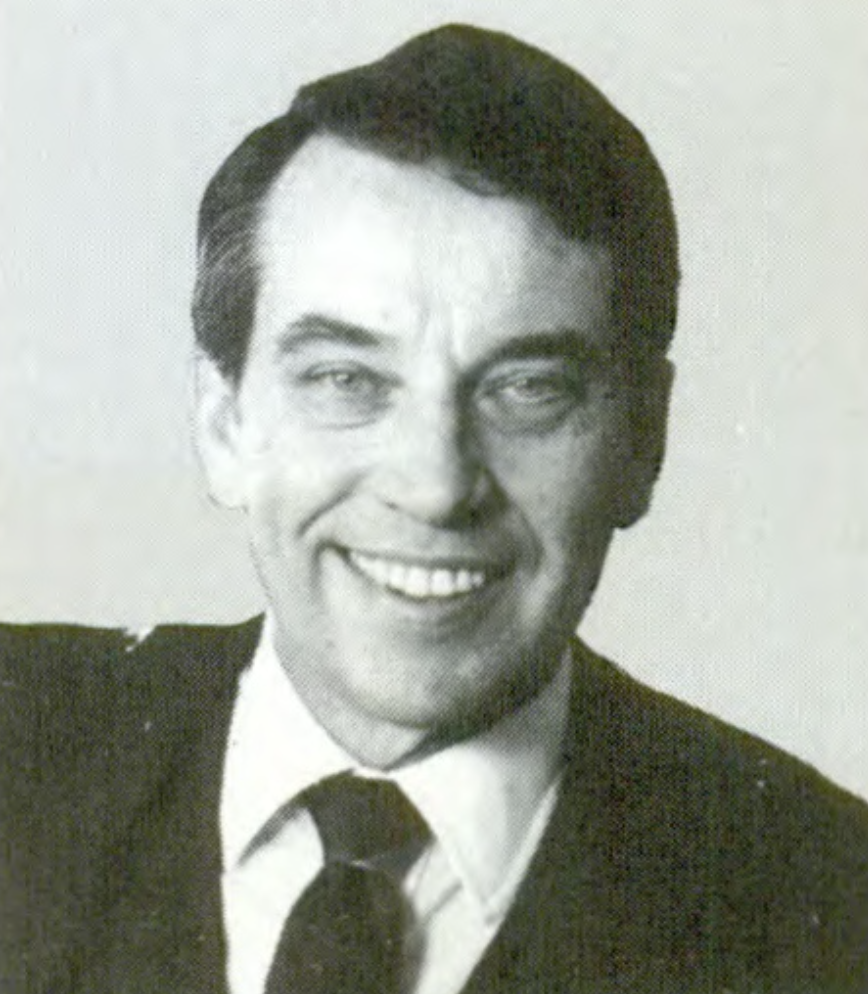

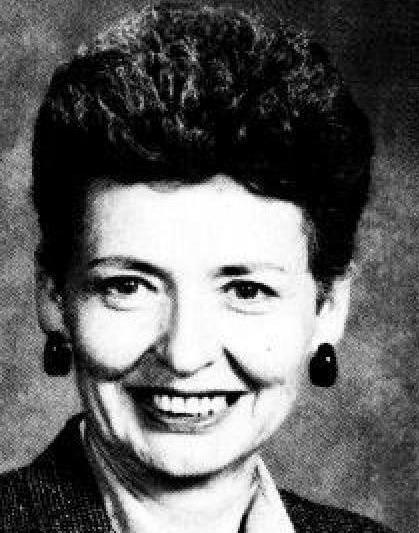
Nominee	Chuck Grassley	Jean Hall Lloyd-Jones
Party	Republican	Democratic
Popular vote	899,761	351,561
Percentage	70.01%	27.20%
- County results Grassley: 50–60% 60–70% 70–80% 80–90% >90%
U.S. senator before election
Chuck Grassley
Republican
Elected U.S. Senator
Chuck Grassley
Republican

The 1992 United States Senate election in Iowa was held November 3, 1992. Incumbent Republican United States Senator Chuck Grassley ran for re-election to a third term in the United States Senate, which he won easily against his Democratic opponent, State Senator Jean Hall Lloyd-Jones.

== Democratic primary ==
=== Candidates ===
- Jean Hall Lloyd-Jones, Iowa State Senator
- Rosanne Freeburg

=== Results ===
Democratic primary results
Party	Candidate	Votes	%
Democratic	Jean Hall Lloyd-Jones	60,615	60.80%
Democratic	Rosanne Freeburg	38,774	38.89%
Democratic	Write-ins	307	0.31%
Total votes		99,696	100.00%

== Republican primary ==
=== Candidates ===
- Chuck Grassley, incumbent United States Senator

=== Results ===
Republican primary results
Party	Candidate	Votes	%
Republican	Chuck Grassley (Incumbent)	109,273	99.70%
Republican	Write-ins	324	0.30%
Total votes		109,597	100.00%

== General election ==
=== Results ===
United States Senate election in Iowa, 1992
Party	Candidate	Votes	%	±%
Republican	Chuck Grassley (Incumbent)	899,761	70.01%	+3.58%
Democratic	Jean Hall Lloyd-Jones	351,561	27.20%	−6.37%
Natural Law	Stuart Zimmerman	16,403	1.27%	
Independent	Sue Atkinson	6,277	0.49%	
Independent	Mel Boring	5,508	0.43%	
Independent	Rosanne Freeburg	4,999	0.39%	
Grassroots	Carl Eric Olsen	3,404	0.26%	
Independent	Richard O'Dell Hughes	2,918	0.23%	
Socialist Workers	Cleve Andrew Pulley	1,370	0.11%	
Write-ins		293	0.02%	
Majority		548,200	42.41%	+9.95%
Turnout		1,292,494		
Republican hold		Swing		

== See also ==
- 1992 United States Senate elections
