= Reid W. Crawford =

American politician (born 1951)

Member of the Iowa House of Representatives from the 42nd district
- In office January 8, 1973 – August 18, 1981
- Preceded by: Russell Wyckoff
- Succeeded by: Ralph Rosenberg

Personal details
- Born: February 6, 1951 (age 75) Ames, Iowa, U.S.
- Party: Republican
- Education: Iowa State University; Drake University Law School
- Occupation: lawyer, academic administrator

Reid W. Crawford (born February 6, 1951) is an American politician, lawyer, and academic administrator. After serving on the Iowa House of Representatives from 1973 to 1981 while attending college and law school, Crawford worked for Iowa State University and the University System of Maryland.

Crawford was born in Ames, Iowa, on February 6, 1951, to parents Harold and Rachel. In 1969, Crawford graduated from Ames High School. He was a member of the Iowa House of Representatives from District 42 between 1973 and 1981. He won his first and second full terms in office by defeating Larry N. Larson, who served a single term for District 34. Politically Crawford was considered a moderate member of the Republican Party. While serving his final full term, Crawford chaired the state house's state government committee.

During his first term in office, Crawford was a senior at Iowa State University. After completing his bachelor's degree in political science and international relations, Crawford graduated from Drake University Law School in 1981, and stepped down from his public office on August 18, 1981, to work for Iowa State University. Despite having resigned his state legislative seat, Crawford considered contesting Iowa's 4th congressional district against incumbent Neal Smith in October 1981. At Iowa State, he was assistant to the university president until 1991, and held a concurrent position as the school's legal advisor until 1994. Crawford was appointed vice president for external affairs at ISU in 1991, and vacated the position at the end of the 1995–1996 academic year to accept a dual role within the University System of Maryland, where he was the vice president for institutional advancement and vice president of the University of Maryland Foundation. Crawford later relocated to Washington, D.C.

Crawford's father Harold, an alumnus and professor of Iowa State, died in 2020, aged 95. Crawford's mother Rachel, who worked for ISU's Office of the Registrar, died in 2024.
