= Sonja Egenes =

American politician (1930–1984)

Member of the Iowa House of Representatives from the 43rd district
- In office January 8, 1973 – January 9, 1983
- Preceded by: Richard M. Radl
- Succeeded by: David Osterberg

Member of the Iowa House of Representatives from the 33rd district
- In office January 11, 1971 – January 7, 1973
- Preceded by: Alfred Nielsen
- Succeeded by: Henry C. Wulff

Personal details
- Born: Sonja Lillian Carlsen; October 19, 1930 Saint Paul, Minnesota, U.S.
- Died: November 27, 1984 (aged 54) Iowa City, Iowa, U.S.
- Resting place: Story City Cemetery, Story City, Iowa, U.S.
- Party: Republican
- Occupation: Politician, teacher

Sonja Lillian Egenes (née Carlsen; October 19, 1930 – November 27, 1984) was an American politician who served in the Iowa House of Representatives from 1971 to 1983. She also was a member of the Luther College Board of Regents.

== Biography ==
She attended St. Olaf College and the University of Iowa; before graduating from Iowa State University (B.S. degree, 1951). Egenes was awarded a Fulbright scholarship to Norway. For 5 years, she worked as a teacher at Randall High School in Randall, Iowa; followed by serving as a teacher of American government at Iowa State University in Ames, from 1960 to 1961.

In 1962, her political career began as a Congressional candidate, she was a member of the Republican Party. She served as a member of the Iowa House of Representatives in the 33rd district from 1971 until 1973; and in the Iowa 43rd district from 1973 until 1983. In 1979, Egenes proposed the state of Iowa to cut off student aid to Iranians on the 34 campuses in the state, which would expel them during the Iranian Revolution.

She died on November 27, 1984, in Iowa City, Iowa at age 54.
