= David Millage =

American politician (1953–2026)

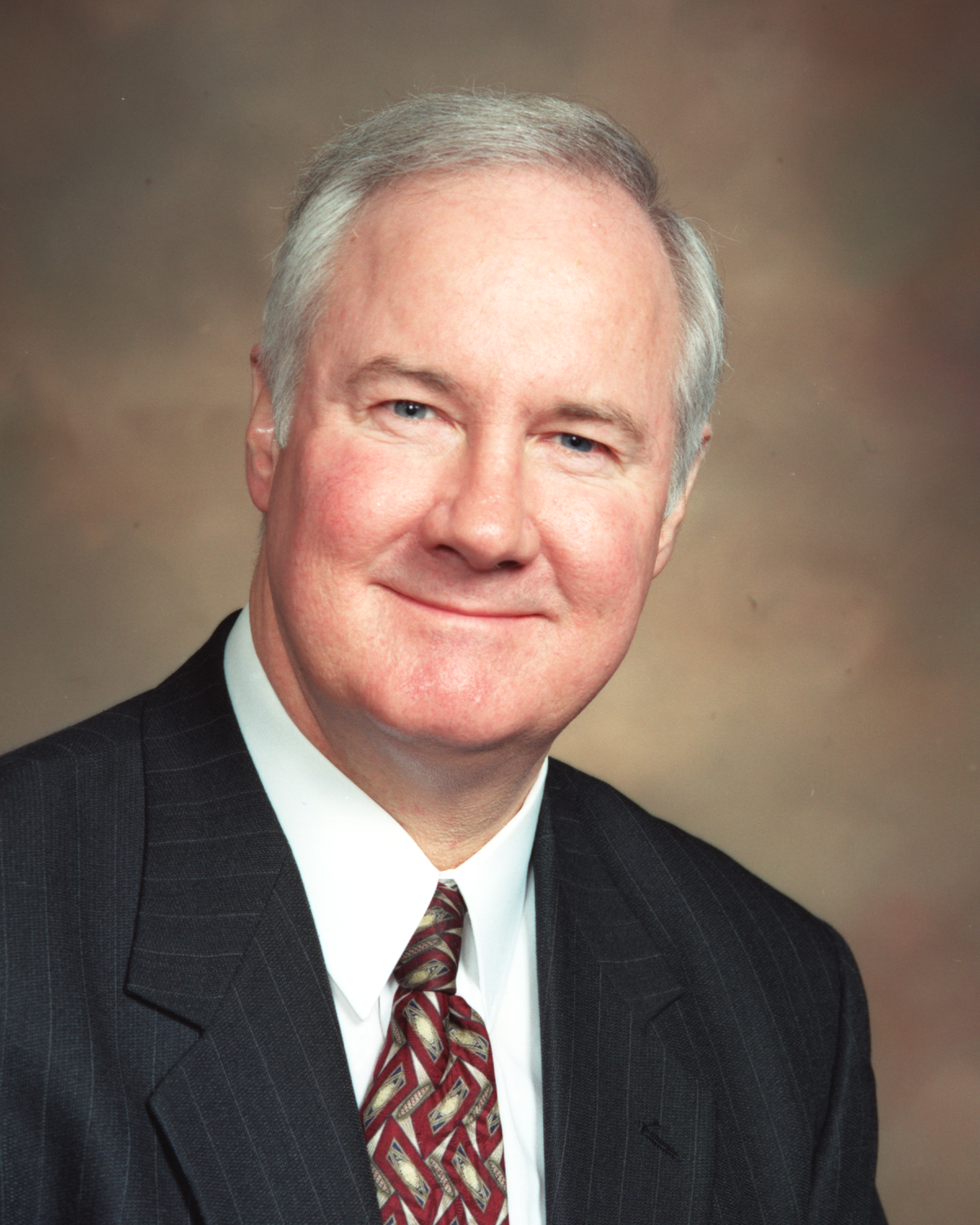

Member of the Iowa House of Representatives from the 41st district
- In office January 10, 1993 – January 12, 2003
- Preceded by: Matthew Wissing
- Succeeded by: Paul Bell

Member of the Iowa House of Representatives from the 40th district
- In office January 14, 1991 – January 10, 1993
- Preceded by: Donald F. Hermann
- Succeeded by: Steven E. Grubbs

Personal details
- Born: February 26, 1953 Portland, Oregon, U.S.
- Died: September 26, 2026 (aged 73)
- Party: Republican
- Spouse: Sandra
- Children: 4
- Education: University of Iowa (BBA, JD)
- Occupation: Lawyer

David Alan Millage (February 26, 1953 – September 26, 2026) was an American politician in the state of Iowa.

== Life and career ==
Millage was born in Portland, Oregon on February 26, 1953. He attended the University of Iowa. A Republican, he served in the Iowa House of Representatives from 1991 to 2003 (41st district from 1993 to 2003, 40th district from 1991 to 1993).

In January 2021, Millage, who had served as the Scott County Republican chairman, was forced out of this role after he had supported impeaching Donald Trump following the 2021 storming of the United States Capitol.

As of 2021, Millage resided in Bettendorf, Iowa. He died after extended illness on September 26, 2026, at the age of 73.

Party political offices
Preceded by Mark Schwickerath	Republican nominee for Attorney General of Iowa; 2002	Vacant Title next held by Brenna Bird
