= Norman P. Dunlap =

American politician (1917–2008)

Member of the Iowa House of Representatives from the 41st district
- In office 1973–1975
- Preceded by: Emil J. Husak
- Succeeded by: Neal Hines

Personal details
- Born: December 17, 1917 Nevada, U.S.
- Died: May 21, 2008 (aged 90)
- Party: Republican
- Education: Iowa State University

Norman P. Dunlap (December 17, 1917 – May 21, 2008) was an American politician. He served as a Republican member for the 41st district of the Iowa House of Representatives.

== Life and career ==
Dunlap was born in Nevada, Iowa (Story County). He attended Iowa State University.

Dunlap served in the Iowa House of Representatives from 1973 to 1975.

Dunlap died on May 21, 2008, at the age of 90.
