= Charles J. Thompson House =

Historic house in Iowa, United States

- U.S. National Register of Historic Places
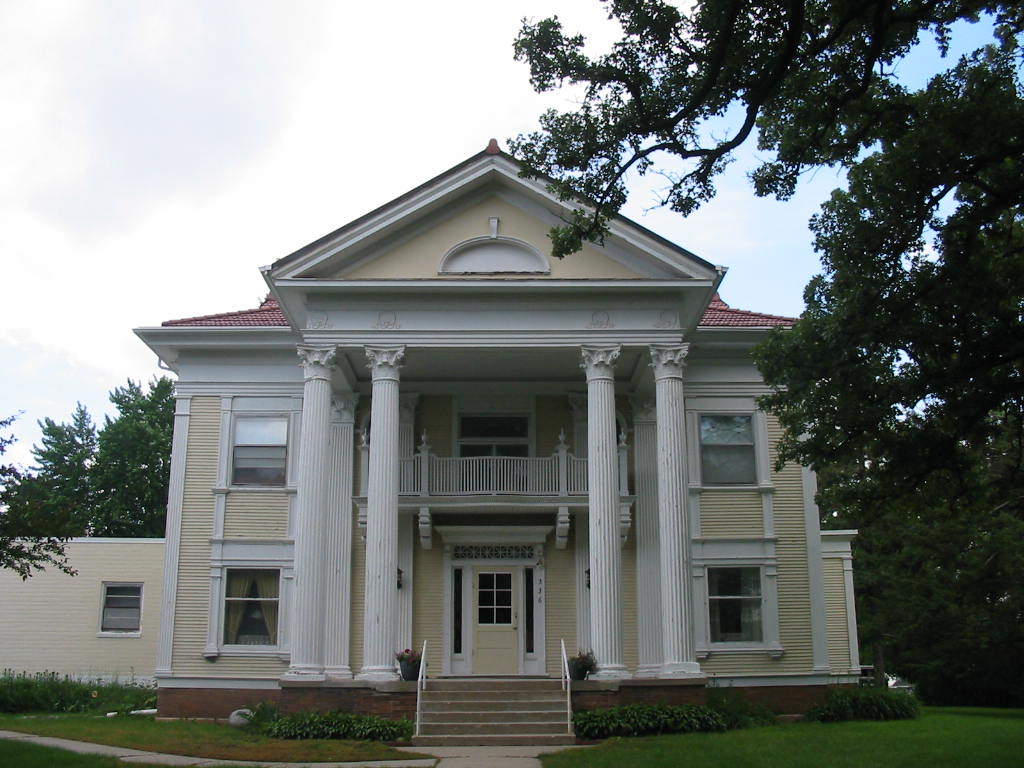

- Location within Iowa Location within the United States
- Location: 336 N. Clark St. Forest City, Iowa
- Coordinates: 43°15′58″N 93°38′18″W
- Area: less than one acre
- Built: 1900
- Architect: William Jean Beauley
- Architectural style: Georgian Revival
- NRHP reference No.: 78001271
- Added to NRHP: November 30, 1978

The Charles J. Thompson House, now known as the Mansion Museum, is a historic building located in Forest City, Iowa, United States. It was designed in the Georgian Revival style by William Jean Beauley of the Chicago architectural firm of Peabody and Beauley. The house was built for a local banker named Charles J. Thompson. The two-story brick structure follows a rectangular plan. It features a hipped roof with deck and a symmetrical facade. The large portico with fluted columns in the Corinthian order and pilasters is the central feature of the house. The house was acquired by the Winnebago Historical Society, which operates it as a local history museum. It was listed on the National Register of Historic Places in 1978.
