= Matthew Oleson =

American politician

Member of the Iowa House of Representatives from the 38th district
- Member-elect
- Assumed office January 1, 2027
- Preceded by: Jon Dunwell

Personal details
- Party: Republican
- Website: www.olesonforiowa.com

Matthew (Matt) Oleson is an American politician. A member of the Republican Party, he was elected to the Iowa House of Representatives in 2026, representing the 38th district. He succeeded fellow Republican Jon Dunwell in the 2026 election. He is a schoolteacher.
