= Ralph Rosenberg =

American politician (born 1949)

Member of the Iowa Senate from the 31st district
- In office 11 January 1993 – 8 January 1995
- Preceded by: Gene Fraise
- Succeeded by: Johnie Hammond

Member of the Iowa Senate from the 37th district
- In office 14 January 1991 – 10 January 1993
- Preceded by: Charles Hughes Bruner
- Succeeded by: Mary Kramer

Member of the Iowa House of Representatives from the 73rd district
- In office 10 January 1983 – 13 January 1991
- Preceded by: Jean Hall Lloyd-Jones
- Succeeded by: William Bernau

Member of the Iowa House of Representatives from the 42nd district
- In office 3 November 1981 – 9 January 1983
- Preceded by: Reid W. Crawford
- Succeeded by: Robert C. Arnould

Personal details
- Born: 7 October 1949 (age 76) Chicago, Illinois, US
- Party: Democratic
- Spouse: Teresa Marie Sturm
- Children: 1
- Education: University of Illinois; Drake University Law School
- Occupation: Politician, lawyer

Ralph Rosenberg (born 7 October 1949) is an American politician.

Ralph Rosenberg is of Jewish descent, born to parents Nathan and Rhea Rosenberg in Chicago on 7 October 1949. He was educated at Bowen High School, and graduated from the University of Illinois in 1972, then completed legal studies at Drake Law School in 1974. He remained in Story County, serving as county attorney for juvenile court and director of the county branch of The Legal Aid Society. Rosenberg was first elected to the Iowa House of Representatives in 1981 and represented District 42. He won his first full term in 1982, and remained in office as the legislator from District 73 between 1983 and 1991. Rosenberg subsequently served on the Iowa Senate, elected from District 37. In the midst of his single term as state senator, Rosenberg was redistricted to District 31.
