= Forest City Municipal Airport =

- IATA: FXY; ICAO: KFXY; FAA LID: FXY

Summary
- Airport type: Public
- Owner: City of Forest City
- Serves: Forest City, Iowa
- Elevation AMSL: 1,229 ft (375 m)
- Coordinates: 43°14′05″N 93°37′27″W
- Website: Forest City Airport

Map
- Location of airport in Iowa / United States FXY (the United States)

Runways
Direction	Length		Surface
Direction	ft	m	Surface
15/33	5,796	1,767	Asphalt
09/27	2,708	825	Asphalt

Statistics (2008)
- Aircraft operations: 5,950
- Based aircraft: 18
- Source: Federal Aviation Administration

Forest City Municipal Airport (IATA: FXY, ICAO: KFXY, FAA LID: FXY) is a public use airport in Hancock County, Iowa, United States. It is located two nautical miles (4 km) south of the central business district of Forest City, a city in Hancock County and Winnebago County. The airport is owned by the City of Forest City. It serves general aviation for Forest City and the surrounding area. Winnebago Industries operates an IAI Astra for company use with the 5800 runway. There is no scheduled air service.

== Facilities and aircraft ==
Forest City Municipal Airport covers an area of 250 acres (100 ha) at an elevation of 1,229 feet (375 m) above mean sea level. It has two asphalt paved runways: 15/33 is 5,796 by 100 feet (1,767 x 30 m) and 9/27 is 2,708 by 60 feet (825 x 18 m).

For the 12-month period ending September 18, 2008, the airport had 5,950 general aviation aircraft operations, an average of 16 per day. At that time there were 18 aircraft based at this airport: 78% single-engine, 6% multi-engine, 6% jet, 11% ultralight.

== See also ==
- List of airports in Iowa
