= Carmine Boal =

American politician (born 1956)

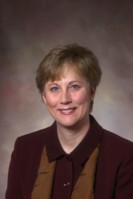

Member of the Iowa House of Representatives from the 70th district 65th (1999-2003)
- In office January 11, 1999 – January 11, 2009
- Preceded by: Jeff Lamberti
- Succeeded by: Kevin Koester

Personal details
- Born: February 28, 1956 (age 70) Mount Pleasant, Iowa
- Party: Republican
- Spouse: Steve
- Education: American Institute of Business
- Website: Boal's website

Carmine Boal (born February 28, 1956) is an American former politician. She served as a representative in the Iowa House of Representatives from the 70th District from 1999 to 2008.

== Early life ==
Boal was born on February 28, 1956, in Mount Pleasant, Iowa. Her parents are Edward and Wilma Roth. She graduated from WACO High School in 1974 and she received her associate degree in executive legal secretarial work from the AIB College of Business in 1976. She received a degree in journalism and public relations from Drake University. She married Steven Boal and the couple have a daughter and two sons.

== Political career ==
Her political experience includes serving as assistant majority leader in the Iowa House. Boal was re-elected in 2006 with 10,945 votes, running unopposed. She is currently on the Boards and Commissions at State of Iowa.

=== Committees ===
During her tenure in the Iowa House, Boal served on several committees:

- Education committee
- Judiciary committee
- State Government committee, where she was the ranking member.
- Education Appropriations Subcommittee.

Iowa House of Representatives
Preceded by Jeff Lamberti	65th District; 1999 – 2003	Succeeded by Wayne Ford
Preceded by Ed Fallon	70th District; 2003 – 2009	Succeeded by Kevin Koester
