= Amy Tagliareni =

American politician

Member of the Iowa House of Representatives from the 42nd district
- Member-elect
- Assumed office January 1, 2027
- Preceded by: Heather Matson

Personal details
- Party: Democratic
- Website: amyforiowa42.com

Amy Tagliareni is an American politician. A member of the Democratic Party, she was elected to the Iowa House of Representatives in 2026, representing the 42nd district. She was elected in the 2026 election. She is a former member of the Ankeny school board.
