= Elizabeth Wilson (politician) =

American politician (born 1964)

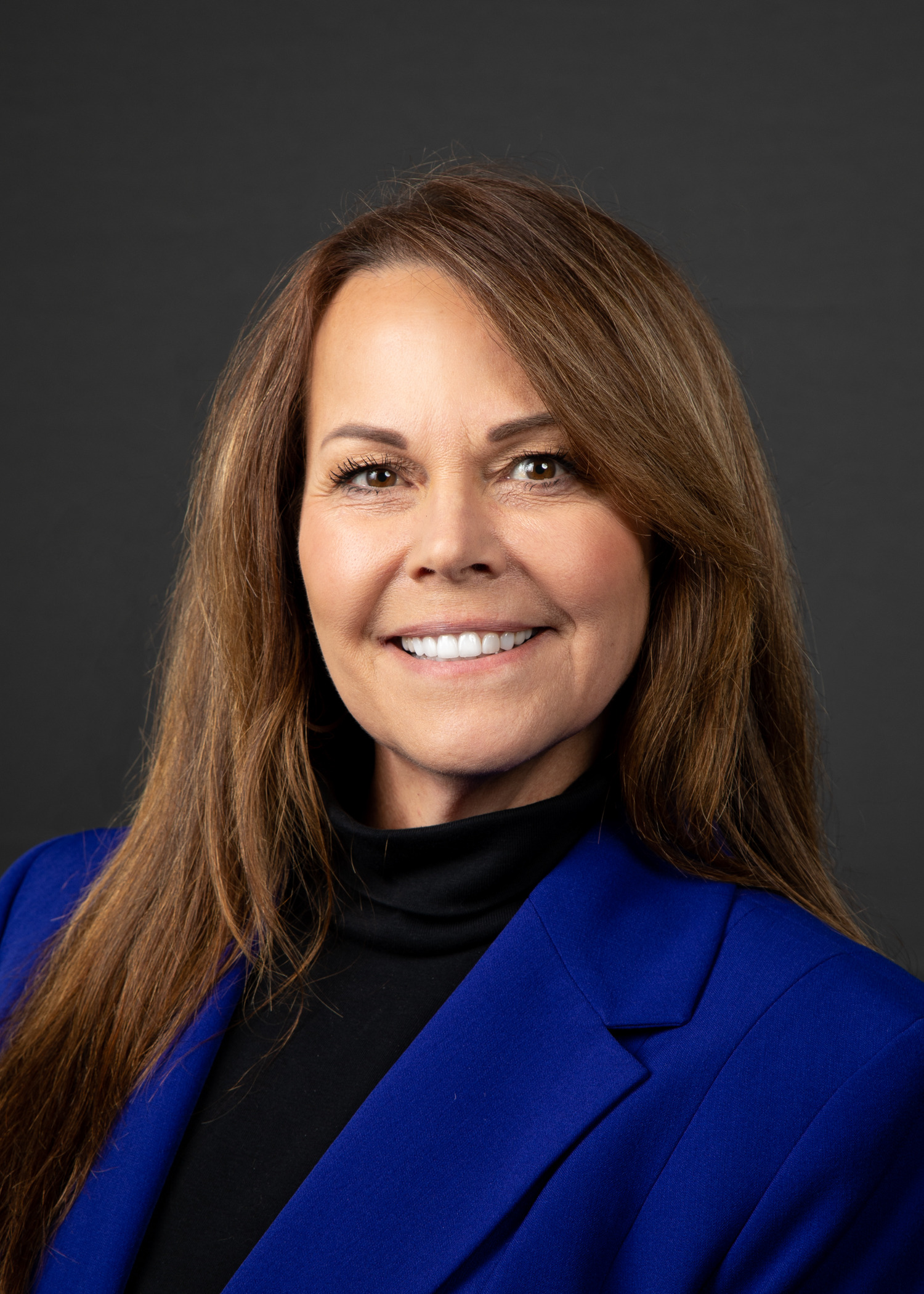

Member of the Iowa House of Representatives from the 73rd district
- Incumbent
- Assumed office January 9, 2023
- Preceded by: Bobby Kaufmann (redistricting)

Personal details
- Born: February 24, 1964 (age 62) Manchester, Iowa, U.S.
- Party: Democratic
- Children: 2
- Education: Cornell College (BA); Tippie College of Business (MBA)
- Occupation: Small business owner

Elizabeth Wilson (born February 24, 1964) is an American politician and small business owner who has represented the 73rd district of the Iowa House of Representatives since January 2023, which consists of parts of central Linn County, including most of Marion. She is a member of the Democratic Party.

== Early life ==
Wilson was born on February 24, 1964, in Manchester, Iowa, and was raised in Center Point, Iowa. Her parents did not have high school diplomas and her family lived on welfare for many years. She received a Bachelor of Arts in mathematics and computer science from Cornell College and a Master of Business Administration from the University of Iowa Tippie College of Business.

== Political career ==
Following decennial redistricting in 2021, Wilson announced her candidacy for the 73rd district of the Iowa House of Representatives in early 2022. She won the Democratic primaries unopposed on June 7, 2022, and defeated Republican Susie Weinacht by 300 votes in the general election on November 8.

In 2024, Wilson filed to run for reelection. She won the Democratic primaries on June 4, 2024, and won unopposed in the general election on November 5, 2024.

Wilson currently serves on the Economic Growth and Technology, Government Oversight, Local Government, Transportation, and Ways and Means committees.

Wilson has said that her priorities include reproductive rights, healthcare, and education. She does not support the use of eminent domain for the benefit of private companies funding CO_{2} pipelines or the use of traffic cameras. She is pro-choice.

Wilson previously served on the Linn-Mar School Board, and at one point was its director.

== Personal life ==
Wilson has two adult children and resides in Marion. She is the president of Wilson Business Services, a financial services company. She has served as treasurer of social service organizations Families Helping Families of Iowa and Systems Unlimited, Inc., and as president of Junior Achievement of Eastern Iowa.

== Electoral history ==
| Election | Political result | Candidate | Party | Votes | % |
|---|---|---|---|---|---|
| Iowa House of Representatives Democratic primary elections, 2022; District 73; Turnout: 2,056 | Democratic (newly redistricted) | Elizabeth Wilson | Democratic | 1,052 | 99.8 |
| Iowa House of Representatives Democratic primary elections, 2022; District 73; Turnout: 2,056 | Democratic (newly redistricted) | Other/Write-in votes | | 4 | 0.2 |
| Iowa House of Representatives general elections, 2022; District 73; Turnout: 14,299 | Democratic (newly redistricted) | Elizabeth Wilson | Democratic | 7,297 | 51.0 |
| Iowa House of Representatives general elections, 2022; District 73; Turnout: 14,299 | Democratic (newly redistricted) | Susie Weinacht | Republican | 6,997 | 48.9 |
| Iowa House of Representatives general elections, 2022; District 73; Turnout: 14,299 | Democratic (newly redistricted) | Other/Write-in votes | | 5 | 0.1 |
