= Arthur A. Small =

American politician and lawyer

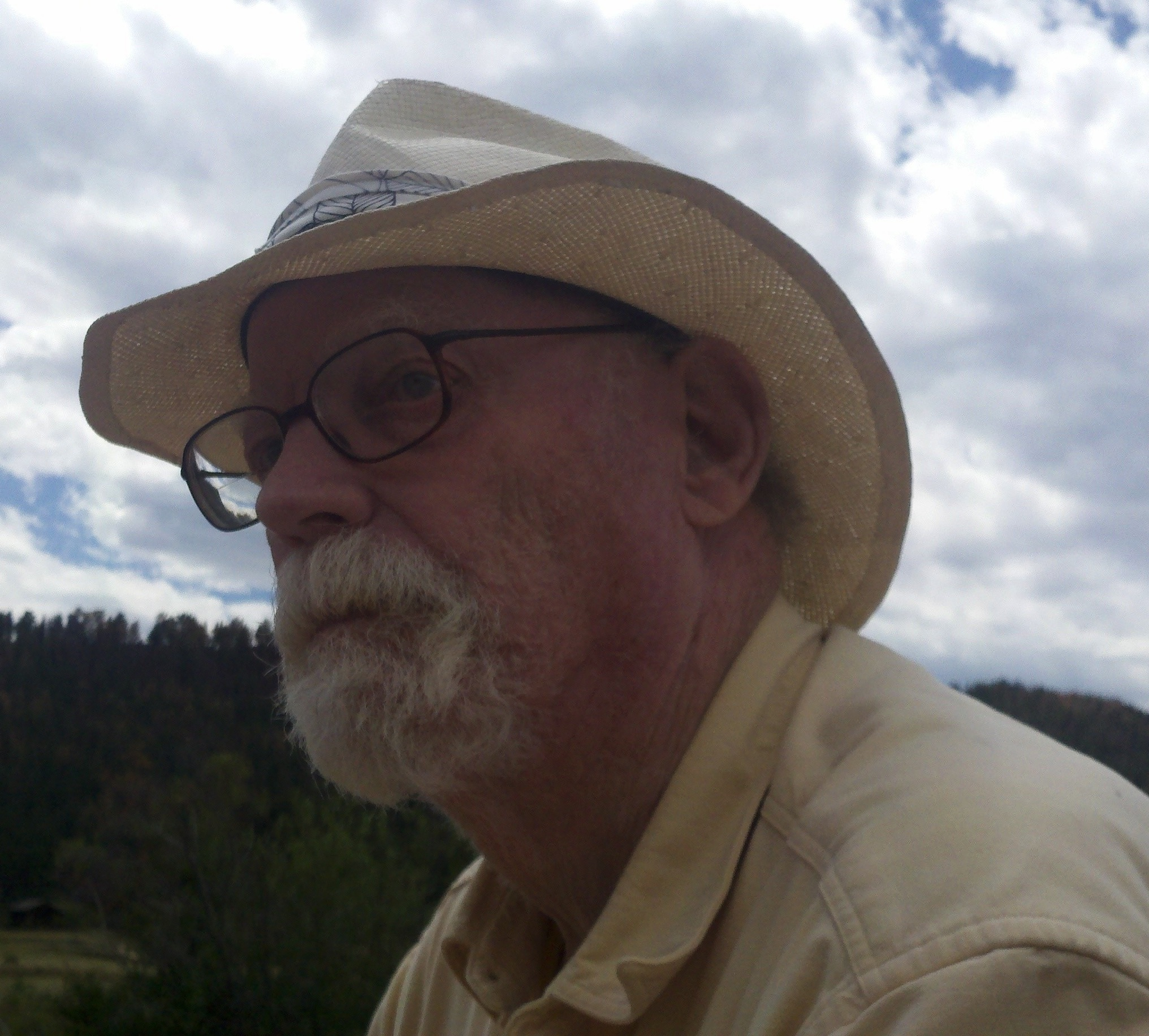

Member of the Iowa Senate from the 23rd district
- In office January 10, 1983 – January 12, 1987
- Preceded by: C. Joseph Coleman
- Succeeded by: Jean Hall Lloyd-Jones

Member of the Iowa Senate from the 37th district
- In office January 8, 1979 – January 10, 1983
- Preceded by: Minnette Doderer
- Succeeded by: Charles H. Bruner

Member of the Iowa House of Representatives from the 73rd district
- In office January 7, 1973 – January 8, 1979
- Preceded by: John E. Camp
- Succeeded by: Jean Hall Lloyd-Jones

Member of the Iowa House of Representatives from the 69th district
- In office January 11, 1971 – January 7, 1973
- Succeeded by: Norman P. Roorda

Personal details
- Born: Arthur Adams Small, Jr. October 14, 1933 Brunswick, Maine, U.S.
- Died: October 3, 2015 (aged 81) Iowa City, Iowa, U.S.
- Party: Democratic
- Spouse: Mary Jo Small
- Children: Peter A. Small, Martha K. Small, Arthur A. Small, III
- Education: Bowdoin College (BA); University of Iowa (MA, JD)
- Occupation: lawyer

Arthur Adams Small, Jr. (October 14, 1933 – October 3, 2015) was an American lawyer and politician in the state of Iowa. He served in the Iowa House of Representatives from 1971 to 1979, and in the Iowa State Senate from 1979 to 1987, as a Democrat.

== Early life ==
Small was born in Brunswick, Maine. He attended Bowdoin College, and served in the United States Army. He later earned a master's degree in English from the University of Iowa.

== Legislative career ==
While serving in the Iowa General Assembly, Small entered law school at the age of forty-eight, earning a Juris Doctor degree from the University of Iowa College of Law. In 1986, Small ran unsuccessfully for Lieutenant Governor of Iowa.

== Post-legislative career ==
From 1987 to 2000, Small practiced law and worked as a lobbyist representing a variety of clients. He lived in Iowa City, Iowa. In 2004, Small ran unsuccessfully for U.S. Senate. He died, aged 81, on October 3, 2015, in Iowa City of kidney failure.

Party political offices
Preceded by David Osterberg	Democratic nominee for U.S. Senator from Iowa (Class 3); 2004	Succeeded by Roxanne Conlin
