= David Osterberg =

American politician (born 1943)

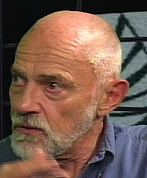

Member of the Iowa House of Representatives from the 50th district
- In office January 11, 1993 – January 8, 1995
- Preceded by: Joyce Nielsen
- Succeeded by: Lynn S. Schulte

Member of the Iowa House of Representatives from the 43rd district
- In office January 10, 1983 – January 10, 1993
- Preceded by: Sonja Egenes
- Succeeded by: Mona Martin

Personal details
- Born: April 19, 1943 (age 83) Aberdeen, Washington, U.S.
- Party: Democratic

David Osterberg (born April 19, 1943) is an American politician who served in the Iowa House of Representatives from 1983 to 1995. He was the unsuccessful Democratic nominee for the United States Senate in 1998. Osterberg endorsed the Elizabeth Warren 2020 presidential campaign.

Party political offices
Preceded by Jean Hall Lloyd-Jones	Democratic nominee for U.S. Senator from Iowa (Class 3); 1998	Succeeded by Arthur A. Small
