= Heather Matson =

American politician

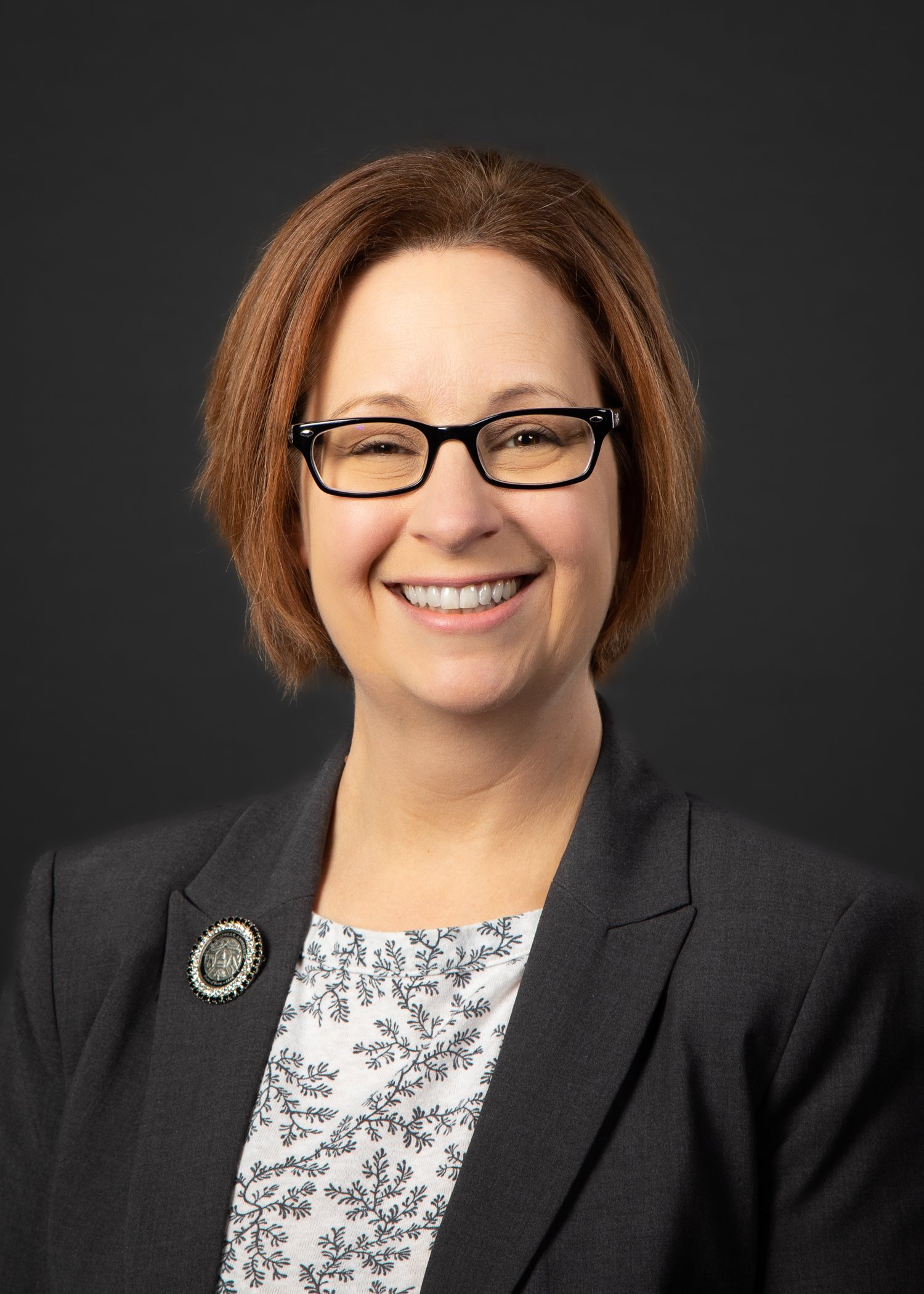
- Official portrait, 2021

Member of the Iowa House of Representatives
- Incumbent
- Assumed office January 9, 2023
- Preceded by: Kristin Sunde
- Succeeded by: Amy Tagliareni (elect)
- Constituency: 42nd district
- In office January 14, 2019 – January 10, 2021
- Preceded by: Kevin Koester
- Succeeded by: Garrett Gobble
- Constituency: 38th district

Personal details
- Born: North Smithfield, Rhode Island, U.S.
- Party: Democratic
- Spouse: Chris
- Children: 2
- Education: Western New England College; George Washington University

Heather Matson is an American politician who is a Democrat representing District 42 in the Iowa House of Representatives. She also served a non-continuous term from 2019 to 2021. She will not seek re-election to the Iowa House and instead launched a campaign for the Iowa Senate in the 2026 Iowa Senate election.

== Political career ==
In 2016, Matson challenged Republican incumbent Kevin Koester for the 38th district seat in the Iowa House of Representatives but lost. In 2018, she ran again and won. She ran for a second term in 2020.

As of June 2020, Matson sat on the following House committees:

- Economic Growth
- Education
- Environmental Protection
- Human Resources
- Economic Development Appropriations Subcommittee

=== Electoral record ===
2016 general election: Iowa House of Representatives, District 38
Party	Candidate	Votes	%
Republican	Kevin Koester	8,793	52.18%
Democratic	Heather Matson	7,264	43.11%
Libertarian	Jeff Meyers	610	3.62%
Unaffiliated	Brett Nelson	183	1.09%

2018 Democratic primary: Iowa House of Representatives, District 38
Party	Candidate	Votes	%
Democratic	Heather Matson	1,914	79.8%
Democratic	Reyma McCoy McDeid	485	20.2%

2018 general election: Iowa House of Representatives, District 38
Party	Candidate	Votes	%
Democratic	Heather Matson	8,216	51.5%
Republican	Kevin Koester	7,710	48.4%
	Other/Write-in	15	0.1%

Iowa House of Representatives
Preceded by Kristin Sunde	42nd District; 2023 – present	Succeeded by Incumbent
Preceded by Kevin Koester	38th District; 2019 – 2021	Succeeded by Garrett Gobble
