= Jean Hall Lloyd-Jones =

American activist and politician

Jean Lloyd-Jones
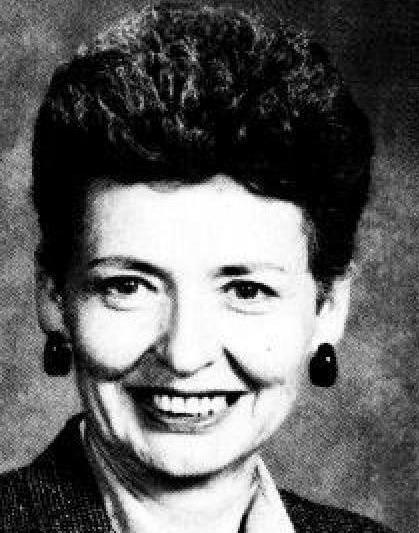

Member of the Iowa Senate from the 23rd district
- In office January 12, 1987 – January 8, 1995
- Preceded by: Arthur A. Small
- Succeeded by: Mary Neuhauser

Member of the Iowa House of Representatives from the 46th district
- In office January 10, 1983 – January 11, 1987
- Preceded by: Rod N. Halvorson
- Succeeded by: Mary Neuhauser

Member of the Iowa House of Representatives from the 73rd district
- In office January 8, 1979 – January 10, 1983
- Preceded by: Arthur A. Small
- Succeeded by: Ralph Rosenberg

Personal details
- Born: October 14, 1929 (age 96) Washington, D.C., U.S.
- Party: Democratic
- Spouse: Richard Lloyd-Jones
- Education: University of New Mexico, Albuquerque (attended); Northwestern University (BA); University of Iowa (MA)

Jean Hall Lloyd-Jones (born October 14, 1929) is an American activist and politician.

== Career ==
Born in Washington, D.C., Lloyd-Jones went to the University of New Mexico. She received her bachelor's degree from Northwestern University and her master's degree from University of Iowa. She was involved with the Iowa Peace Institute and the Iowa League of Women Voters. Lloyd-Jones served as a Democrat, from Iowa City, Iowa, in the Iowa House of Representatives from 1979 to 1987 and then in the Iowa Senate from 1987 to 1995.

Lloyd-Jones ran for U.S. Senate in 1992 during the "Year of the Woman," but lost to incumbent Chuck Grassley.

== Notes ==
Party political offices
Preceded by John Roehrick	Democratic nominee for U.S. Senator from Iowa (Class 3); 1992	Succeeded by David Osterberg
