= Kevin Koester =

American politician (born 1954)

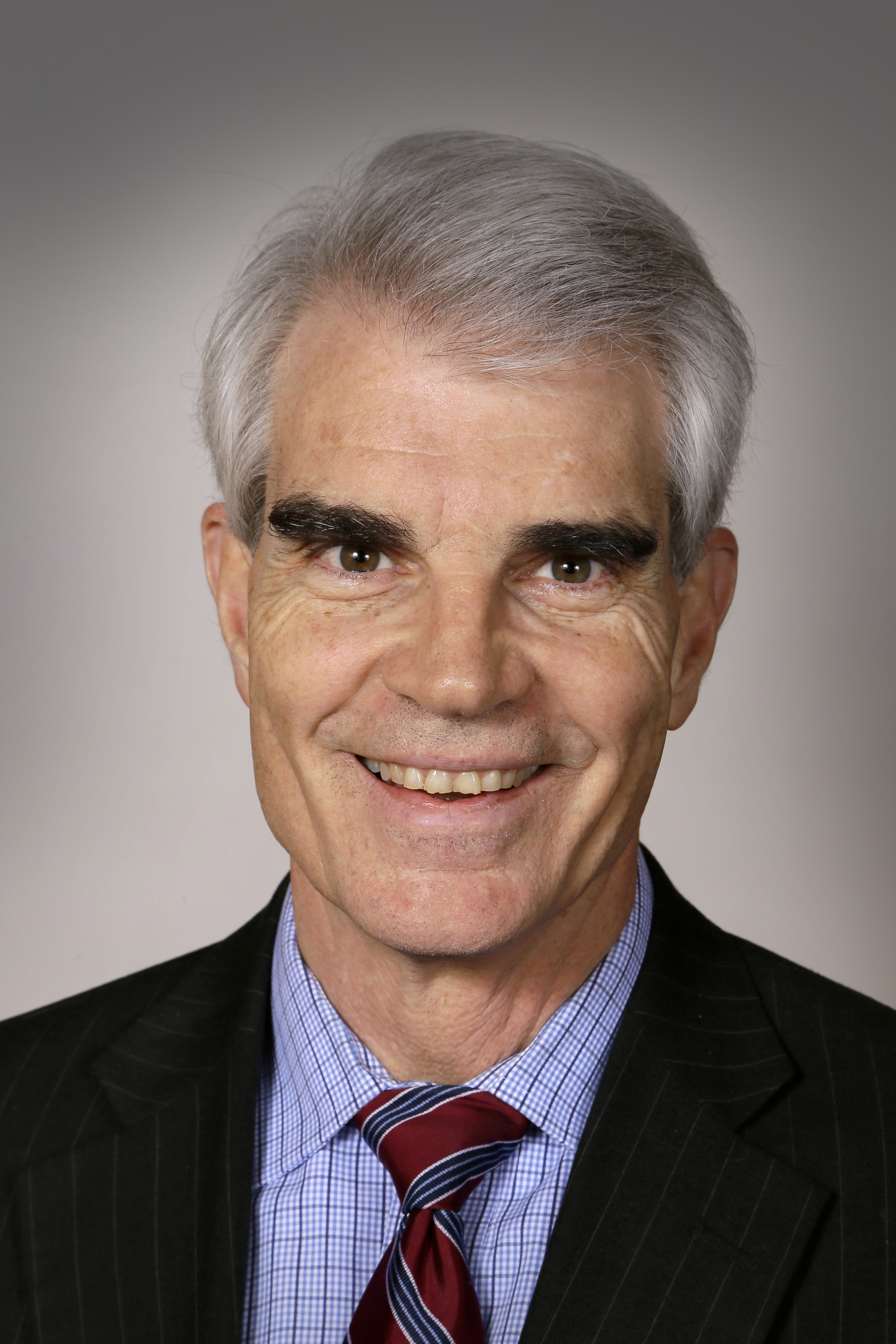
- 86th General Assembly portrait (2015)

Member of the Iowa House of Representatives from the 38th district 70th (2009–2013)
- In office January 12, 2009 – 2019
- Preceded by: Carmine Boal
- Succeeded by: Heather Matson

Personal details
- Born: June 3, 1954 (age 72) Harlan, Iowa, U.S.
- Party: Republican
- Education: University of Iowa
- Occupation: School administrator
- Website: legis.iowa.gov/...

Kevin Koester (born June 3, 1954) was the Iowa State Representative from the 38th District. A Republican, he served in the Iowa House of Representatives from 2009 - 2018. Koester was born in Harlan, raised in Des Moines, and resides in Ankeny. He has a B.A. in education from the University of Iowa.

As of May 2013, Koester served on several committees in the Iowa House – the Appropriations, Education, Human Resources, and State Government committees. He also served as the chair of the Government Oversight committee.

== Electoral history ==
*incumbent

Election	Political result	Candidate	Party	Votes	%
Iowa House of Representatives primary elections, 2008; District 70; Turnout: 1,212	Republican	Kevin Koester	Republican	879	72.52%
Iowa House of Representatives primary elections, 2008; District 70; Turnout: 1,212	Republican	Jeff A. Wright	Republican	324	26.73%
Iowa House of Representatives general elections, 2008; District 70; Turnout: 23,313	Republican hold	Kevin Koester	Republican	12,043	51.66%
Iowa House of Representatives general elections, 2008; District 70; Turnout: 23,313	Republican hold	Matt Pfaltzgraf	Democratic	10,355	46.23%
Iowa House of Representatives primary elections, 2010; District 70	Republican	Kevin Koester*	Republican	unopposed	
Iowa House of Representatives general elections, 2010; District 70	Republican hold	Kevin Koester*	Republican	unopposed	
Iowa House of Representatives primary elections, 2012; District 38; Turnout: 551	Republican	Kevin Koester*	Republican	456	82.76%
Iowa House of Representatives primary elections, 2012; District 38; Turnout: 551	Republican	Brett H. Nelson	Republican	80	14.52%
Iowa House of Representatives general elections, 2018; District 38; Turnout: 15,941	Democratic Iowa Democratic Party	Heather Matson	Democratic	8,216	51.50%
Iowa House of Representatives general elections, 2018; District 38; Turnout: 15,941	Democratic Iowa Democratic Party	Kevin Koester*	Republican	7,710	48.40%

Iowa House of Representatives
Preceded by Carmine Boal	70th District; 2009–2013	Succeeded by Todd Taylor
Preceded by Tyler Olson	38th District; 2013–present	Succeeded by Incumbent
