= Iowa's 38th House of Representatives district =

American legislative district

House District 38
- Type: District of the Lower house
- Location: Iowa
- Representative: Vacant
- Parent organization: Iowa General Assembly

The 38th District of the Iowa House of Representatives in the state of Iowa. It is currently composed of part of Jasper County.

== Current elected officials ==
Jon Dunwell most recently represented the district.

== Past representatives ==
The district has previously been represented by:

- Charles J. Uban, 1971–1973
- Harold O. Fischer, 1973–1975
- T. Cooper Evans, 1975–1979
- Robert H. Renken, 1979–1983
- Arthur Ollie, 1983–1997
- Polly Bukta, 1997–2003
- Rob Hogg, 2003–2007
- Tyler Olson, 2007–2013
- Kevin Koester, 2013–2019
- Heather Matson, 2019–2021
- Garrett Gobble, 2021–2023
- Jon Dunwell, 2023–2026
