= John E. Camp =

American politician (1915–1988)

Member of the Iowa House of Representatives from the 73rd district
- In office January 11, 1971 – January 7, 1973

Member of the Iowa House of Representatives from the 45th district
- In office January 9, 1967 – January 10, 1971
- In office January 12, 1959 – January 10, 1965

Personal details
- Born: March 5, 1915 Elvira, Iowa, U.S.
- Died: May 4, 1988 (aged 73)
- Party: Republican
- Spouse: Dorothy Mowatt (m. 1938)
- Children: 1
- Occupation: Politician, farmer

John E. Camp (March 5, 1915 – May 4, 1988) was an American farmer and politician from Iowa.

Camp was born to parents Walter and Johanna Camp on March 5, 1915. He was raised on the family farm outside Elvira, Iowa, alongside nine siblings, and attended the local Elvira Consolidated School. Camp married Dorothy Mowatt in 1938, with whom he raised a son. The family settled in Bryant, where they lived throughout Camp's tenure on the Iowa House of Representatives.

Camp was a member of the Iowa Farm Bureau, served in a leadership role for the Clinton County Red Cross, and held the directorship of the Clinton National Bank. He assumed several roles throughout the American Lutheran Church and was a 32nd degree Freemason. Prior to his election to the Iowa House as a Republican in 1958, Camp had served on the Clinton County board of supervisors for eight years, including a three-year tenure as chair. Camp was elected to six consecutive terms as state representative. From 1959 to 1971, he represented District 45. In his final term, Camp served District 73. Camp died on May 4, 1988.
