= Garrett Gobble =

American politician and educator

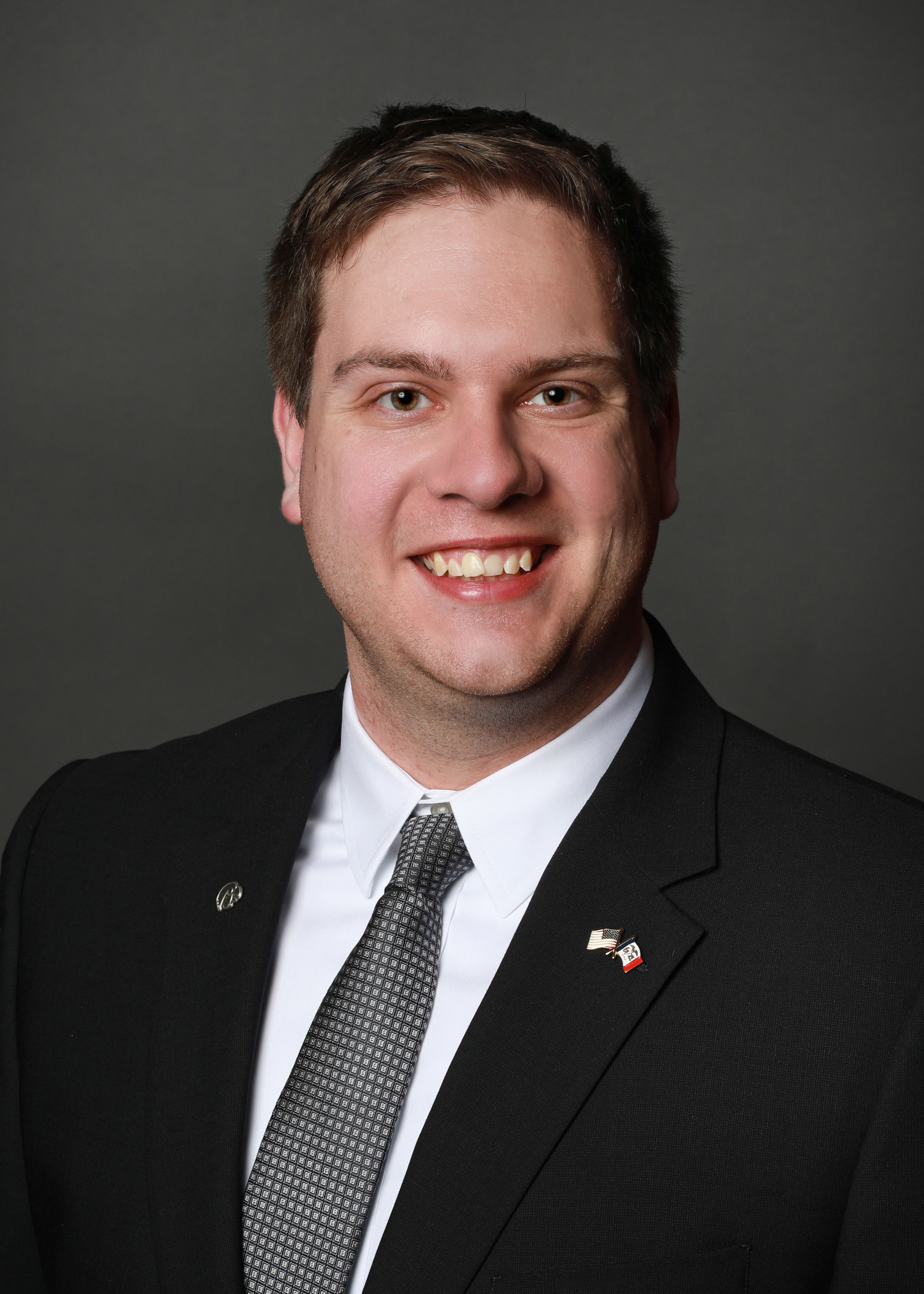
- Gobble in 2021

Member of the Iowa House of Representatives from the 38th district
- In office January 11, 2021 – January 9, 2023
- Preceded by: Heather Matson
- Succeeded by: Heather Matson (redistricting)

Personal details
- Born: May 2, 1995 (age 31) Mount Pleasant, Iowa, U.S.
- Party: Republican
- Spouse: Elizabeth
- Education: Southeastern Community College (AA); University of Iowa (BA)

Garrett Gobble (born May 2, 1995) is an American politician and educator who served as a member of the Iowa House of Representatives from the 38th district. Elected in November 2020, he assumed office on January 11, 2021 and served until January 8, 2023.

== Early life and education ==
Gobble was born in Mount Pleasant, Iowa. After graduating from Southeastern Community College, he earned a Bachelor of Arts degree in history from the University of Iowa in 2017.

== Career ==
After graduating from college, Gobble moved to Iowa City, Iowa and worked as a substitute teacher and as a clerk at Hy-Vee. In 2018, he was hired by the Ankeny Community School District as an eighth grade social studies teacher. He was elected to the Iowa House of Representatives in November 2020 and assumed office on January 11, 2021, serving until January 8, 2023. Gobble also served as vice chair of the House Education Appropriations Subcommittee.

== Personal life ==
Gobble's wife, Elizabeth, is an English teacher at Southeast Polk High School.
