= Russell Wyckoff =

American politician

Russell L. Wyckoff (2 March 1925 – 3 September 2004) was an American politician.

Wyckoff was born near Urbana, Iowa, where his family owned a farm, on 2 March 1925. He graduated from high school in 1942 and enlisted in the United States Army. He saw action with Company L of the 87th Infantry Division in the Battle of the Bulge. During his military service, Wyckoff was awarded the Bronze Star and the Combat Infantryman Badge. He was discharged in 1945 with the rank of staff sergeant. Wyckoff subsequently returned to farming, and married Margie Ploeger in 1946. The couple raised four sons and lived in Vinton. During the 1950s, Wyckoff operated a plumbing and heating business.

Wyckoff's political career included a five-year stint on the Urbana Consolidated School Board, and one term on the Benton County Board of Supervisors. He won election to the Iowa House of Representatives for the first time in 1970, and held the District 42 seat as a Democrat for two years. Wyckoff was elected thrice thereafter to represent District 31, stepping down at the end of his fourth consecutive term in 1979. He died on 3 September 2004, aged 79. Margie Wyckoff died in 2013.
