= Wes Breckenridge =

American politician

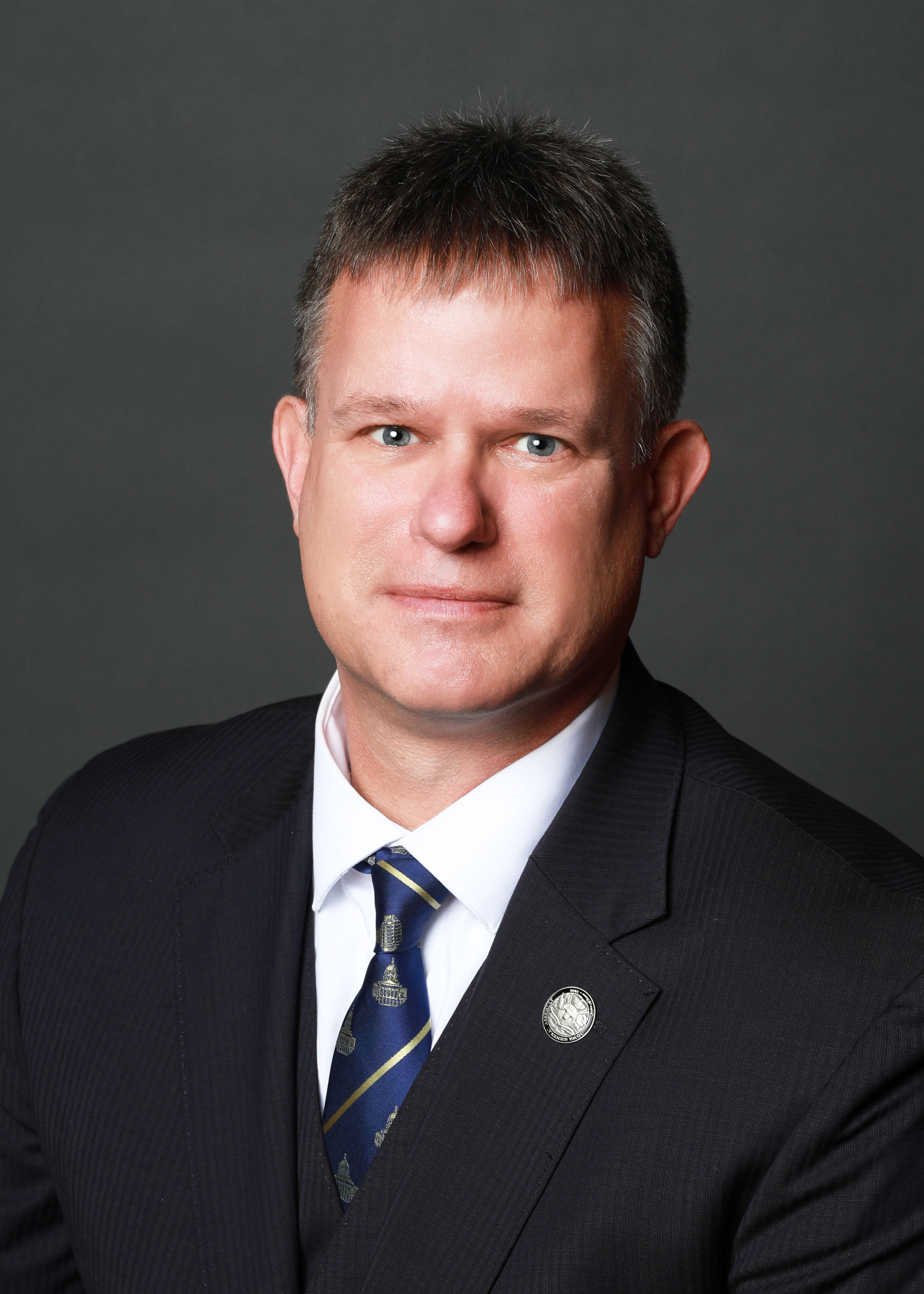
- Breckenridge in 2021

Member of the Iowa House of Representatives from the 29th district
- In office January 8, 2017 – September 10, 2021
- Preceded by: Dan Kelley
- Succeeded by: Jon Dunwell

Personal details
- Party: Democratic

Wes Breckenridge (born 1968) is an American politician from the state of Iowa. He is a former member of the Iowa House of Representatives who represented the 29th district. Breckenridge announced that, effective September 10, 2021, he would be resigning his seat to take a job with the Iowa Law Enforcement Academy. A special election was held to elect his replacement.
