= Iowa's 42nd House of Representatives district =

American legislative district

House District 42
- Type: District of the Lower house
- Location: Iowa
- Representative: Heather Matson
- Parent organization: Iowa General Assembly

The 42nd District of the Iowa House of Representatives in the state of Iowa. It is currently composed of part of Polk County.

== Current elected officials ==
Heather Matson is the representative currently representing the district.

== Past representatives ==
The district has previously been represented by:

- Russell L. Wyckoff, 1971–1973
- Reid W. Crawford, 1973–1981
- Ralph Rosenberg, 1981–1983
- Robert C. Arnould, 1983–1993
- Robert L. Rafferty, 1993–1995
- Jamie Van Fossen, 1995–2003
- Geri Huser, 2003–2011
- Kim Pearson, 2011–2013
- Peter Cownie, 2013–2019
- Kristin Sunde, 2019–2023
- Heather Matson, 2023–2027
- Amy Tagliareni, 2027
