= Charles J. Uban =

American politician (1921–2003)

Member of the Iowa House of Representatives from the 38th district
- In office January 11, 1971 – January 7, 1973

Member of the Iowa House of Representatives from the 66th district
- In office January 11, 1965 – January 8, 1967

Personal details
- Born: Charles John Uban II; June 29, 1921 Thompson, Iowa, U.S.
- Died: September 2, 2003 (aged 82)
- Party: Democratic
- Spouse: Emma Jo Schnucker (m. 1945)
- Children: 5
- Education: West High School; Iowa State University
- Occupation: Politician

Military service
- Allegiance: United States
- Battles/wars: World War II
- Awards: Distinguished Flying Cross; Air Medal; Bronze Star Medal (×4)

Charles John Uban II (June 29, 1921 – September 2, 2003) was an American politician.

Uban was born in Thompson, Iowa, on June 29, 1921, the son of John and Mildred Uban. After graduating from West High School in Waterloo in 1939, Uban served in World War II as a pilot in the Burma campaign, and flew for the China National Aviation Corporation from 1943 to 1947. The United States Armed Forces awarded Uban four Bronze Service Stars, an Air Medal, and the Distinguished Flying Cross. After leaving the military, Uban earned a degree in electrical engineering from Iowa State College in 1949, and founded the Uban Oil Company of Waterloo that same year. He later flew for Pan Am.

Politically, Uban was affiliated with the Democratic Party, and served two nonconsecutive terms on the Iowa House of Representatives. From January 11, 1965 to January 8, 1967, he held the District 66 seat. Between January 11, 1971 and January 7, 1973, Uban represented District 38.

Uban married Emma Jo Schnucker in 1945, with whom he raised five children. He died on September 2, 2003.
