= Forest City, Iowa =

City in the United States

- City
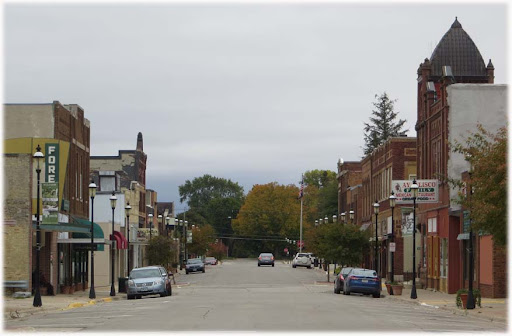
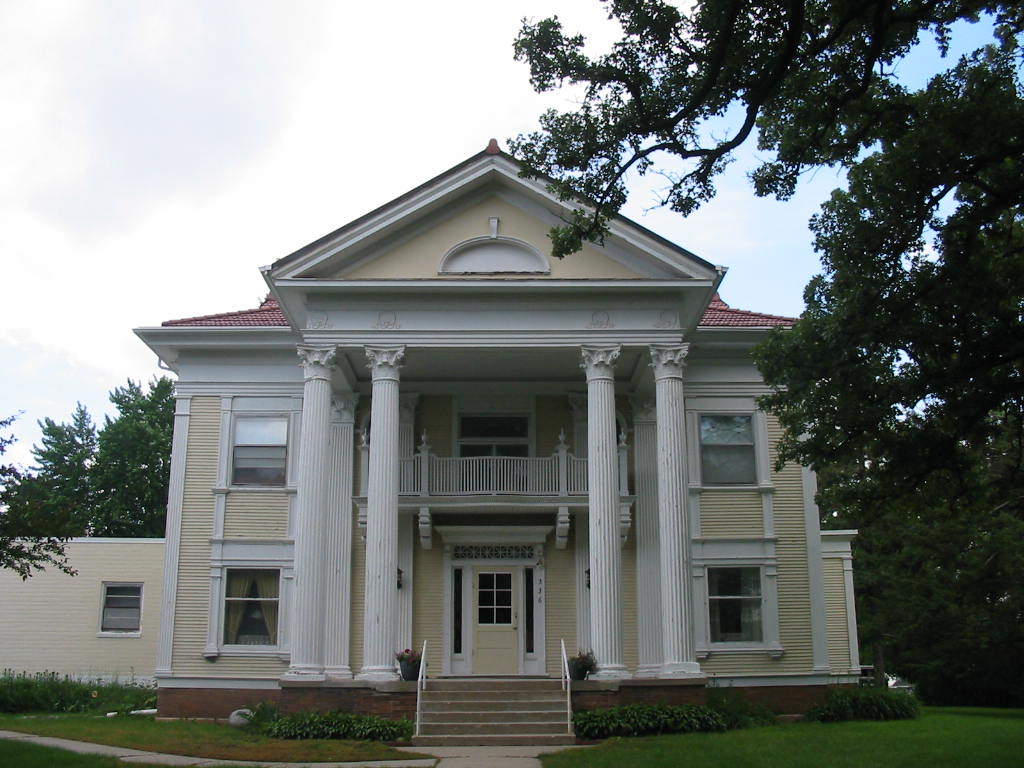
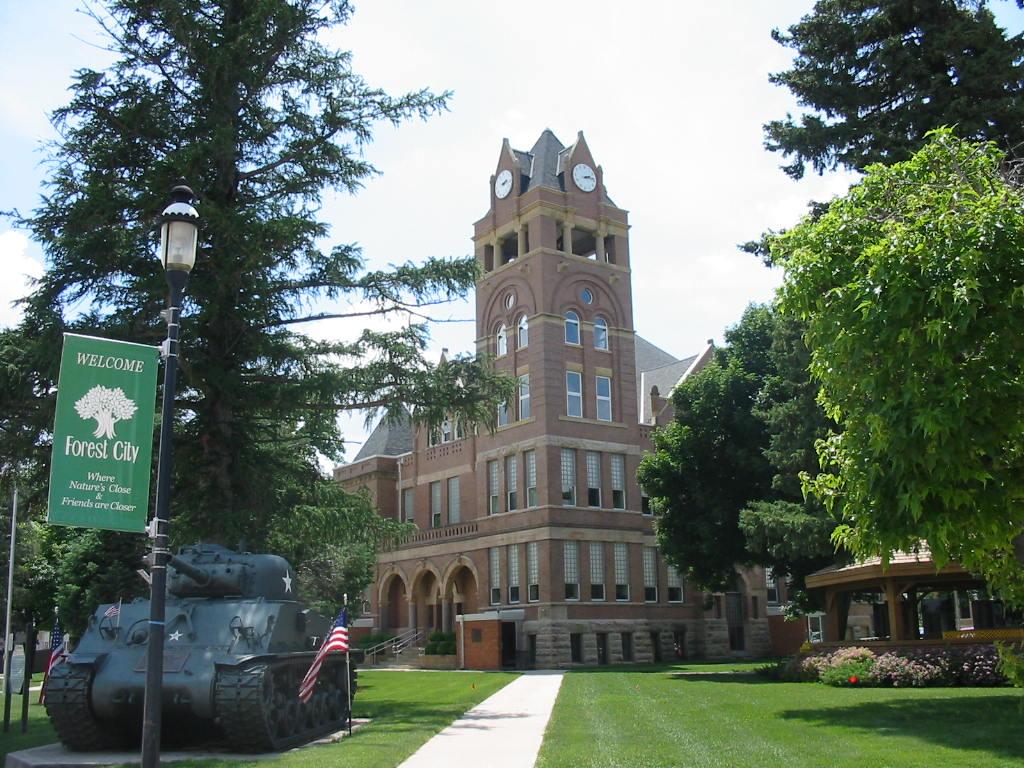
- Downtown Forest City Thompson Mansion Museum Winnebago County Courthouse

- Logo
- Motto(s): Where Nature's Close and Friends are Closer
- Location of Forest City, Iowa

- Location in the United States
- Coordinates: 43°15′10″N 93°37′50″W
- Country: USA
- State: Iowa
- Counties: Winnebago, Hancock
- Incorporated: June 14, 1878

Area
  - Total: 4.59 sq mi (11.90 km^{2})
  - Land: 4.59 sq mi (11.90 km^{2})
  - Water: 0 sq mi (0.00 km^{2})
- Elevation: 1,260 ft (380 m)

Population (2020)
  - Total: 4,285
  - Density: 932.6/sq mi (360.07/km^{2})
- Time zone: UTC-6 (Central (CST))
  - Summer (DST): UTC-5 (CDT)
- ZIP code: 50436
- Area code: 641
- FIPS code: 19-28380
- GNIS feature ID: 2394787
- Website: cityofforestcity.com

Forest City is a city in Hancock County and Winnebago County in the U.S. state of Iowa, and the county seat of Winnebago County. The population was 4,285 in the 2020 census, a decline from the 4,362 population in 2000. Forest City is the home of Waldorf University, a private university, and the primary manufacturing center for Winnebago Industries.

== History ==
Forest City was officially founded in 1855. Formerly known as “Puckerbrush”, Robert Clark the official founder/surveyor deemed it “Forest City” because it was cut right out of the trees. It was then platted in 1856, and later incorporated on June 14, 1878. The population started to grow when immigrants from Sweden and Norway settled in the Forest City area because of the similar topography. Its growth continued as city leaders convinced the Minneapolis and St. Louis Railroad to come through Forest City. Although the Civil War stunted the area's growth, many immigrants found the city attractive. Later on churches, banks, a college (Waldorf University), electricity, and the telephone turned Forest City into an ideal country town. In 1960, investors took over a failing travel trailer factory and created Winnebago Industries, creating what would become one of the largest employers in the region and causing the population to grow. Winnebago's corporate headquarters were later relocated to Eden Prairie, Minnesota causing the population to decline. Today, Forest City's population is around 4,200.

== Geography ==
According to the United States Census Bureau, the city has a total area of 4.64 square miles (12.02 km^{2}), all land.

=== Climate ===
According to the Köppen Climate Classification system, Forest City has a hot-summer humid continental climate, abbreviated "Dfa" on climate maps.

Climate data for Forest City, Iowa, 1991–2020 normals, extremes 1894–present
Month	Jan	Feb	Mar	Apr	May	Jun	Jul	Aug	Sep	Oct	Nov	Dec	Year
Record high °F (°C)	64 (18)	67 (19)	86 (30)	94 (34)	106 (41)	104 (40)	108 (42)	105 (41)	101 (38)	97 (36)	80 (27)	69 (21)	108 (42)
Mean maximum °F (°C)	43.2 (6.2)	47.9 (8.8)	66.1 (18.9)	80.9 (27.2)	87.5 (30.8)	91.6 (33.1)	92.0 (33.3)	90.3 (32.4)	87.7 (30.9)	82.0 (27.8)	65.9 (18.8)	48.1 (8.9)	94.4 (34.7)
Mean daily maximum °F (°C)	22.7 (−5.2)	27.1 (−2.7)	40.4 (4.7)	56.3 (13.5)	68.5 (20.3)	78.1 (25.6)	81.3 (27.4)	79.0 (26.1)	73.0 (22.8)	59.5 (15.3)	42.5 (5.8)	28.5 (−1.9)	54.7 (12.6)
Daily mean °F (°C)	14.1 (−9.9)	18.3 (−7.6)	31.4 (−0.3)	45.2 (7.3)	57.8 (14.3)	68.0 (20.0)	71.4 (21.9)	68.9 (20.5)	61.5 (16.4)	48.4 (9.1)	33.4 (0.8)	20.7 (−6.3)	44.9 (7.2)
Mean daily minimum °F (°C)	5.6 (−14.7)	9.5 (−12.5)	22.5 (−5.3)	34.2 (1.2)	47.2 (8.4)	58.0 (14.4)	61.5 (16.4)	58.7 (14.8)	50.0 (10.0)	37.3 (2.9)	24.3 (−4.3)	12.9 (−10.6)	35.1 (1.7)
Mean minimum °F (°C)	−15.8 (−26.6)	−10.8 (−23.8)	0.3 (−17.6)	20.2 (−6.6)	34.7 (1.5)	46.2 (7.9)	51.1 (10.6)	48.5 (9.2)	35.9 (2.2)	22.4 (−5.3)	7.1 (−13.8)	−8.6 (−22.6)	−18.5 (−28.1)
Record low °F (°C)	−36 (−38)	−33 (−36)	−26 (−32)	6 (−14)	22 (−6)	34 (1)	38 (3)	35 (2)	20 (−7)	−3 (−19)	−13 (−25)	−28 (−33)	−36 (−38)
Average precipitation inches (mm)	1.15 (29)	1.33 (34)	1.94 (49)	3.89 (99)	4.83 (123)	5.51 (140)	4.60 (117)	3.79 (96)	3.46 (88)	2.58 (66)	1.61 (41)	1.23 (31)	35.92 (913)
Average snowfall inches (cm)	10.7 (27)	9.0 (23)	5.6 (14)	1.3 (3.3)	0.0 (0.0)	0.0 (0.0)	0.0 (0.0)	0.0 (0.0)	0.0 (0.0)	0.2 (0.51)	2.8 (7.1)	10.6 (27)	40.2 (101.91)
Average precipitation days (≥ 0.01 in)	4.7	4.3	7.1	9.3	11.6	11.3	8.5	8.8	7.7	7.6	5.0	5.3	91.2
Average snowy days (≥ 0.1 in)	5.1	3.8	2.9	0.6	0.0	0.0	0.0	0.0	0.0	0.2	1.7	4.8	19.1
Source 1: NOAA
Source 2: National Weather Service

== Demographics ==
Historical population
Census	Pop.	Note	%±
1870	155		—
1880	688		343.9%
1890	895		30.1%
1900	1,758		96.4%
1910	1,691		−3.8%
1920	2,145		26.8%
1930	2,016		−6.0%
1940	2,545		26.2%
1950	2,766		8.7%
1960	2,930		5.9%
1970	3,841		31.1%
1980	4,270		11.2%
1990	4,430		3.7%
2000	4,362		−1.5%
2010	4,151		−4.8%
2020	4,285		3.2%
U.S. Decennial Census

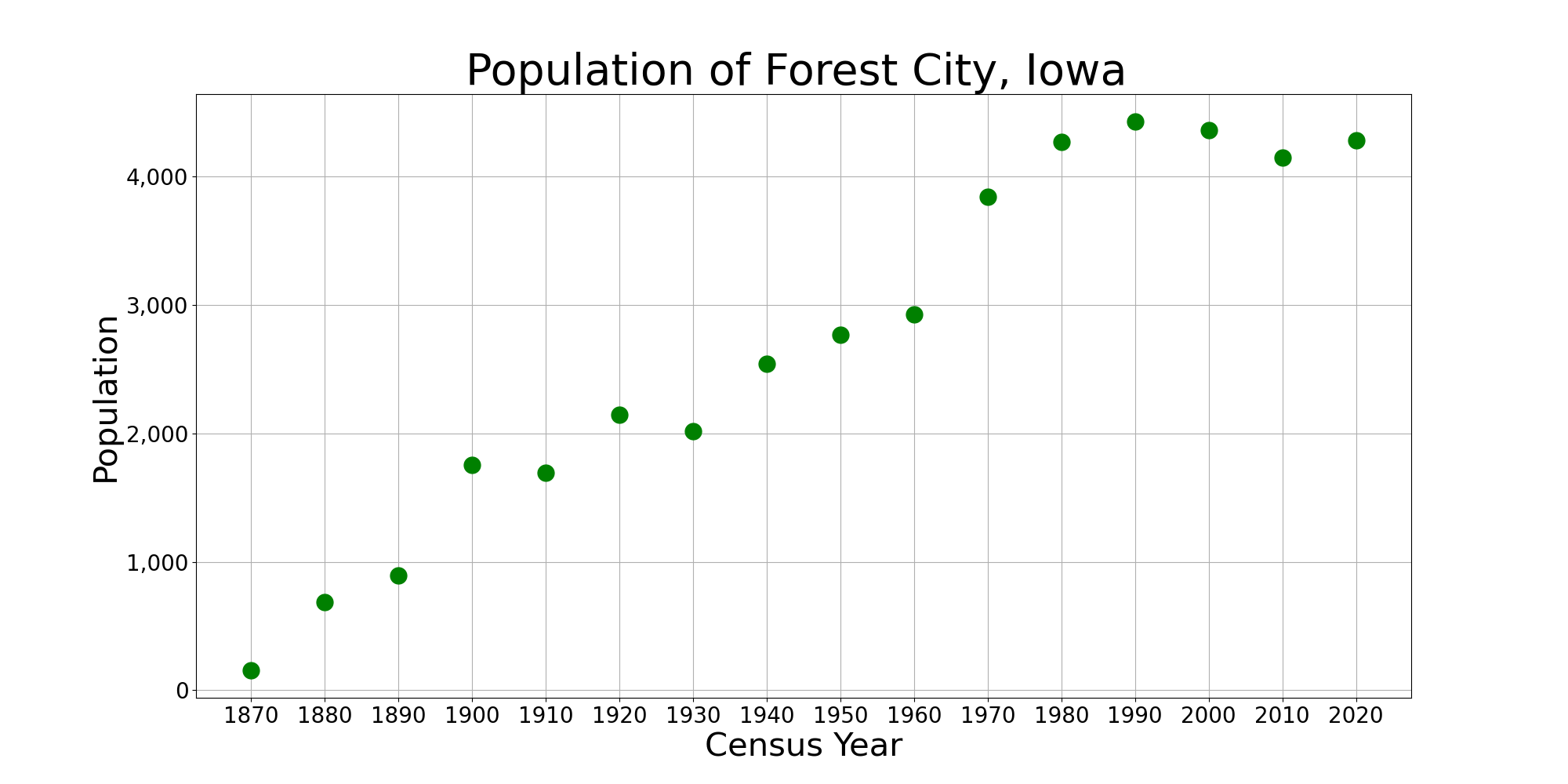
The population of Forest City, Iowa from US census data

=== 2020 census ===
As of the 2020 census, Forest City had a population of 4,285, with 1,714 households and 992 families residing in the city. The population density was 932.6 inhabitants per square mile (360.1/km^{2}). There were 1,894 housing units at an average density of 412.2 per square mile (159.2/km^{2}).

The median age was 36.2 years. 20.2% of residents were under the age of 18, and 19.0% were 65 years of age or older. 25.9% of residents were under the age of 20; 10.9% were between the ages of 20 and 24; 22.2% were from 25 to 44; and 22.1% were from 45 to 64. The gender makeup of the city was 50.0% male and 50.0% female. For every 100 females there were 100.0 males, and for every 100 females age 18 and over there were 99.0 males age 18 and over.

There were 1,714 households, of which 25.8% had children under the age of 18 living with them. Of all households, 43.0% were married-couple households, 6.5% were cohabitating couples, 22.5% were households with a male householder and no spouse or partner present, and 28.0% were households with a female householder and no spouse or partner present. 42.1% of households were non-families. About 35.8% of all households were made up of individuals, and 16.9% had someone living alone who was 65 years of age or older.

There were 1,894 housing units, of which 9.5% were vacant. The homeowner vacancy rate was 1.6% and the rental vacancy rate was 9.9%. 0.0% of residents lived in urban areas, while 100.0% lived in rural areas.

Racial composition as of the 2020 census
Race	Number	Percent
White	3,678	85.8%
Black or African American	172	4.0%
American Indian and Alaska Native	14	0.3%
Asian	81	1.9%
Native Hawaiian and Other Pacific Islander	3	0.1%
Some other race	109	2.5%
Two or more races	228	5.3%
Hispanic or Latino (of any race)	266	6.2%

=== 2010 census ===
At the 2010 census there were 4,151 people, 1,686 households, and 1,008 families living in the city. The population density was 894.6 inhabitants per square mile (345.4/km^{2}). There were 1,909 housing units at an average density of 411.4 per square mile (158.8/km^{2}). The racial makup of the city was 94.9% White, 1.5% African American, 0.2% Native American, 1.3% Asian, 0.5% from other races, and 1.5% from two or more races. Hispanic or Latino of any race were 3.0%.

Of the 1,686 households 26.8% had children under the age of 18 living with them, 46.1% were married couples living together, 9.3% had a female householder with no husband present, 4.4% had a male householder with no wife present, and 40.2% were non-families. 34.0% of households were one person and 14.4% were one person aged 65 or older. The average household size was 2.23 and the average family size was 2.84.

The median age was 38.6 years. 20.5% of residents were under the age of 18; 16.4% were between the ages of 18 and 24; 20.3% were from 25 to 44; 26.5% were from 45 to 64; and 16.5% were 65 or older. The gender makeup of the city was 49.0% male and 51.0% female.

=== 2000 census ===
At the 2000 census there were 4,362 people, 1,692 households, and 1,084 families living in the city. The population density was 1,049.7 inhabitants per square mile (405.3/km^{2}). There were 1,809 housing units at an average density of 435.3 per square mile (168.1/km^{2}). The racial makup of the city was 95.97% White, 0.57% African American, 0.07% Native American, 1.22% Asian, 0.02% Pacific Islander, 1.47% from other races, and 0.69% from two or more races. Hispanic or Latino of any race were 3.26%.

Of the 1,692 households 32.7% had children under the age of 18 living with them, 52.1% were married couples living together, 8.9% had a female householder with no husband present, and 35.9% were non-families. 31.1% of households were one person and 13.4% were one person aged 65 or older. The average household size was 2.35 and the average family size was 2.96.

Age spread: 24.3% under the age of 18, 14.7% from 18 to 24, 24.9% from 25 to 44, 21.3% from 45 to 64, and 14.7% 65 or older. The median age was 35 years. For every 100 females, there were 95.1 males. For every 100 females age 18 and over, there were 93.2 males.

The median household income was $40,031 and the median family income was $50,699. Males had a median income of $30,430 versus $21,883 for females. The per capita income for the city was $18,285. About 4.7% of families and 9.7% of the population were below the poverty line, including 14.5% of those under age 18 and 9.1% of those age 65 or over.

== Economy ==
The headquarters of Winnebago Industries, a manufacturer of motorhomes founded by local resident John K. Hanson, was located in Forest City. In August, 2021, Winnebago announced that it will be moving its corporate headquarters to Eden Prairie, Minnesota, effective December 1, but that the company's manufacturing presence will be maintained in Forest City.

== Parks and recreation ==
There are three bike trails located in Forest City. The Hanson Trail (9.0 miles), Hynes Spur (2.0 miles) and The Pilot Knob Loop (4.0 miles).

Forest City has a disc golf course consisting of 21 holes.

== Education ==
The Forest City Community School District operates a wind turbine that provides 60% of the energy needs of elementary, middle, and high school.

Forest City Christian School is an independent school district located in Forest City. it is not accredited, so that credits acquired do not transfer to other schools.

Forest City is the home of Waldorf University, a four-year liberal arts university, previously owned by Mayes Education Inc before finalizing its return to nonprofit roots in 2025.

== Infrastructure ==
=== Transportation ===
The Forest City Municipal Airport located 2 miles south of the Forest City business district serves general aviation in the area. The airport was activated in 1958 and as of 2011 has two asphalt paved runways, one is 5,796 by 100 feet (1,767 x 30 m) and the other is 2,708 by 60 feet (825 x 18 m).

== Notable people ==
- Bob Baker (1910–1975), actor, singing cowboy in western films
- Lute Barnes (b. 1947) played Major League Baseball for the New York Mets
- Dean Borg (1938 – 2020), journalist
- Terry Branstad (b. 1946), former governor of Iowa
- Mike Stensrud (b. 1956) American football defensive lineman who played in the NFL
- Henry Teigan (1881–1941) a labor leader, editor and a U.S. Representative from Minnesota
- Jack Rebney (1929–2023) the Winnebago Man, whose angry rant from a 1989 RV advert went viral on the internet in the early 2000s.
