= Winnebago County Courthouse (Iowa) =

- U.S. National Register of Historic Places
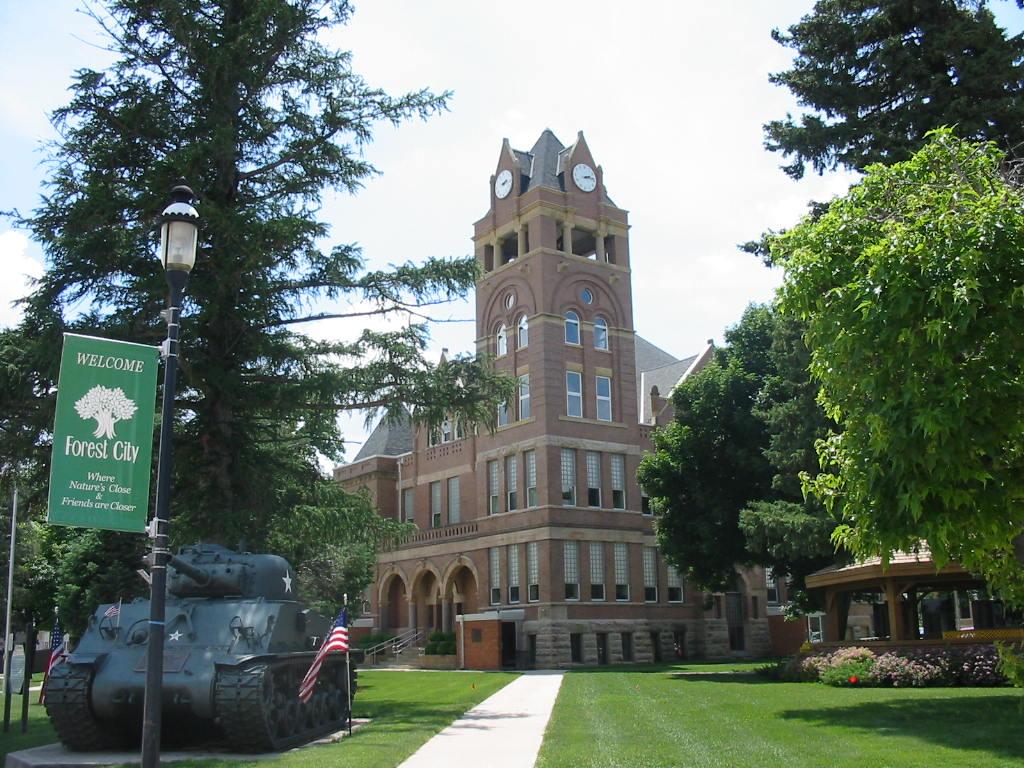

- Location within Iowa Location within the United States
- Interactive map showing the location for Winnebago County Courthouse
- Location: J St. Forest City, Iowa
- Coordinates: 43°15′46.9″N 93°38′20.7″W
- Area: less than one acre
- Built: 1894–1896
- Built by: Martin Bumgardner
- Architect: Kinney & Orth
- Architectural style: Romanesque
- MPS: County Courthouses in Iowa TR
- NRHP reference No.: 81000275
- Added to NRHP: July 02, 1981

Winnebago County Courthouse in Forest City, Iowa, United States, is a historic building and active courthouse. It was listed on the National Register of Historic Places in 1981.

== History ==
Because early county records were destroyed in an 1861 fire it is difficult to determine where court proceedings were held in Winnebago County's early years. County voters petitioned for a $20,000 courthouse to be built, but little work was done on the building. The county Board of Supervisors eventually decided the courthouse plans were too extravagant, and a smaller, less expensive structure was built. The courts determined that the Board of Supervisors had acted inappropriately and was still responsible for the bonds. They settled for $3,500 in compensation for the construction. The present Romanesque Revival style building was completed in 1896 for about $25,000. It was designed by Minneapolis architect F.W. Kinney from the firm of Kinney & Orth. It was built by contractor Martin Bumgardner and F.A. Gross. Funds were raised through local subscriptions. An addition was added on the west side in 2002.

== Architecture ==
The courthouse is a two-story buff-colored brick structure. The basement level is composed of coarse stone. The main entrance is in a recessed area behind three arches, which is possibly the most interesting feature of the building. A large square clock tower rising five stories on the northeast corner of the building. The building is capped with a hipped roof, however, there are pyramid shaped roofs on the projecting pavilions on three corners. The tower roof has been shortened. The significance of the courthouse is derived from its association with county government, and the political power and prestige of Forest City as the county seat.
