= Paul Bell (politician) =

American politician (1950–2010)

Paul A. Bell
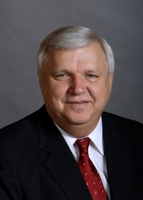

Member of the Iowa House of Representatives from the 41st district 57th (1993–2003)
- In office January 11, 1993 – June 7, 2010
- Preceded by: Daniel Petersen
- Succeeded by: Dan Kelley

Personal details
- Born: October 3, 1950 Algona, Iowa, U.S.
- Died: June 7, 2010 (aged 59) Newton, Iowa, U.S.
- Party: Democratic
- Spouse: Niki
- Education: University of Northern Iowa
- Website: Bell's website

Paul A. Bell (October 3, 1950 – June 7, 2010) was an American politician who served as Iowa State Representative from the 57th and 41st Districts. He served in the Iowa House of Representatives from the 57th District (1993 - 2003) and the 41st District from 2003 until his death in June 2010. He received his BA from the University of Northern Iowa.

Bell served on several committees in the Iowa House—the Ethics committee; the Public Safety committee; the Transportation committee; the Veterans Affairs committee; and the Natural Resources committee, where he was chair. He also served on the Agriculture and Natural Resources Appropriations Subcommittee.

Bell was re-elected in 2006 with 7,303 votes (63%), defeating Republican opponent Adam Vandall.

Bell died at the Skiff Medical Center in Newton, Iowa on June 7, 2010, after a year-long battle with stomach cancer.

Iowa House of Representatives
Preceded by Daniel Petersen	57th District; 1993–2003	Succeeded by Jack Drake
Preceded by David Millage	41st District; 2003–2010	Succeeded by Dan Kelley
