= Thomas Fey (politician) =

American politician (born 1954)

Member of Iowa House of Representatives for District 41
- In office 1983–1990

Member of Iowa House of Representatives for District 81
- In office 1982–1982

Personal details
- Born: June 6, 1954 (age 72) Davenport, Iowa
- Party: Democratic

Thomas H. Fey (born June 6, 1954) is an American politician. He was a member of the Iowa House of Representatives.

Fey was born on June 6, 1954, in Davenport, Iowa, to Robert and Margaret Fey. He attended Central High School, then studied history at St. Ambrose University. In 1981, he married Lucy Gomez.

Fey endorsed the Pete Buttigieg 2020 presidential campaign.
