= Dean Borg =

American journalist (1938–2020)

- Born: Eldean A. Borg; April 21, 1938; Forest City, Iowa, U.S.
- Died: March 22, 2020 (aged 81); Iowa City, Iowa
- Education: Iowa State University; University of Iowa
- Occupation(s): Journalist; Air Force Public Affairs officer
- Spouse(s): Sheila Borg; Linda Borg (married Aug. 31, 1957; died Sept. 21, 1973)
- Children: 4 sons, 1 daughter
- Parent(s): Albert and Addie Borg

Eldean Borg (April 21, 1938 – March 22, 2020) was an American journalist. He was the host of Iowa Press on Iowa PBS from 1971 to 2017, and "one of the most respected journalists in Iowa."

Borg, was a native of Forest City, Winnebago County, Iowa. He graduated in 1959, from Iowa State University in Ames, Iowa, where he was named Outstanding Broadcast Journalist. As a student, he worked at WOI radio, which is now part of Iowa Public Radio (IPR). He later also attended the University of Iowa, in Iowa City, where he earned his Masters of Public Administration.

After college, he served as a public information officer in the United States Air Force, where he flew on missions into the Panama Canal Zone just prior to the Bay of Pigs Invasion. Borg left active duty in the early 1960s but continued to serve as an Air Force Public Affairs Reservist until his military retirement in 1995.

After serving in the military, Borg began his journalism career, working at WMT in Cedar Rapids, where he ultimately oversaw a workforce of thirty-four sports, weather and farm journalists, who broadcast news on television and radio. He also continued to report, including as a war correspondent in South Vietnam and Southeast Asia and from Paris for the Paris Peace Talks.

Borg left WMT in 1971 to lead public information for the University of Iowa Hospitals and Clinics. He also continued his broadcast career in 1972, becoming host of Iowa Press, a weekly public affairs program, on Iowa Public Television, and eventually became the longest-serving host and moderator in Iowa PBS history; he retired in 2017.

== Awards and recognition ==
Borg was the recipient of a number of awards during his career. A selection of his awards are listed below.

- 2017 Inducted into the Gold Circle Honor Society, National Academy of Television Arts and Sciences, Upper Midwest Region awards.
- 2016 Winner of the James W. Schwartz Award for outstanding achievement in journalism, Iowa State University, Greenlee School of Journalism and Communication.
- 2012 Winner Mitchell V. Charnley Award, Midwest Broadcast Journalists Association.
- 2008 Winner of the Jack Shelley Award, Iowa Broadcast News Association.
- 1991 Distinguished Alumni Citation, Iowa State University.
- 1959 Winner Outstanding Broadcast Journalist, Iowa State University.
