= Dan Kelley =

American politician

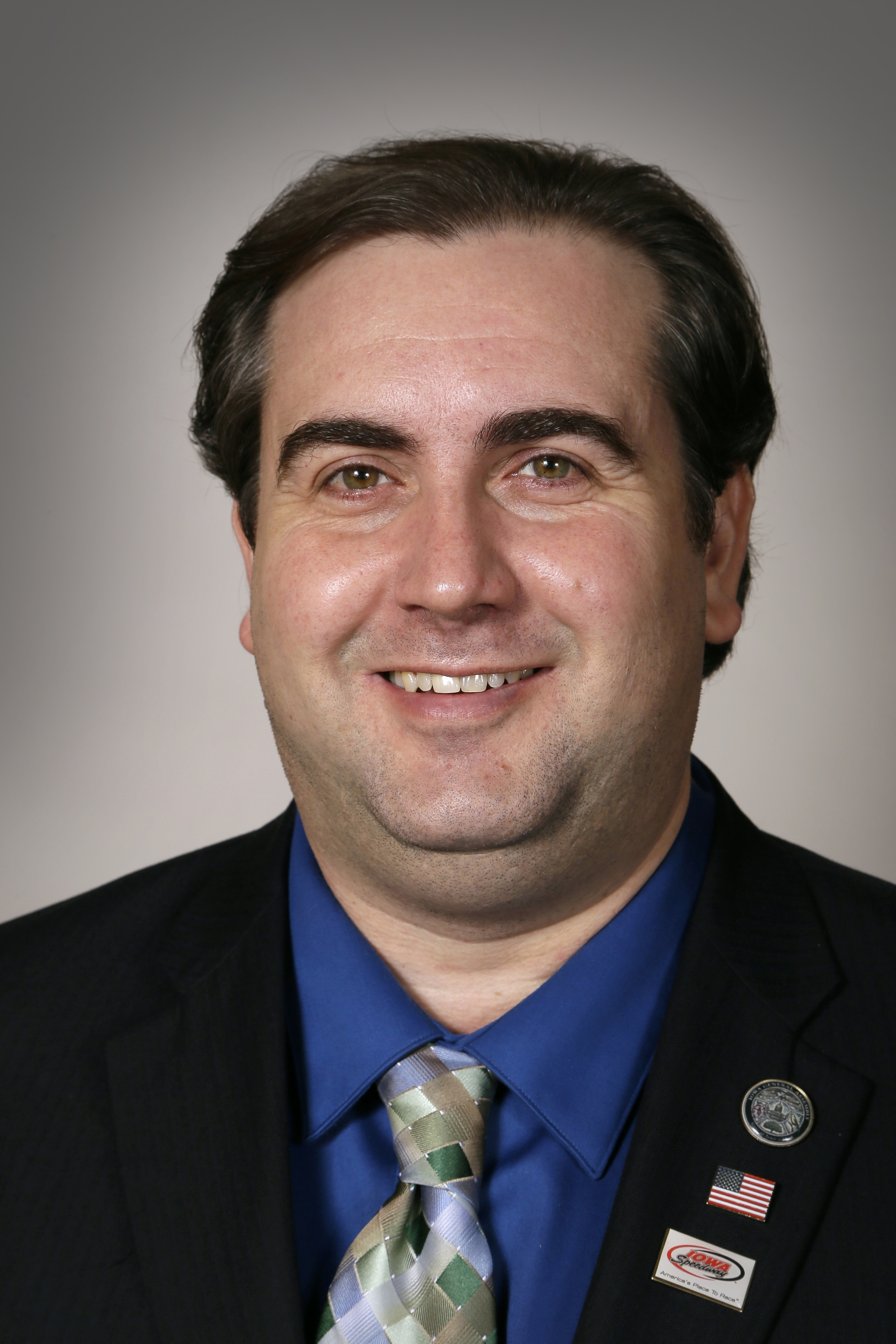

Member of the Iowa House of Representatives from the 29th district 41st (2011–2013)
- In office January 10, 2011 – January 8, 2017
- Preceded by: Paul Bell
- Succeeded by: Wes Breckenridge

Personal details
- Born: 1970 (age 55–56) Marshalltown, Iowa, U.S.
- Party: Democratic
- Education: University of Iowa
- Profession: Realtor/Small Business Owner
- Website: legis.iowa.gov/...

Daniel D. Kelley (born 1970) is the former Iowa State Representative from the 29th District. He has served in the Iowa House of Representatives from 2011 to 2017. Kelley was born in Marshalltown, Iowa and was raised and resides in Newton. He has a B.A. with honors in communication studies from the University of Iowa.

Kelley endorsed Martin O'Malley in the 2016 Presidential Election.

In 2017, Dan Kelley founded the Stand Up to Bullies Party and lost reelection in a defeat to Democrat Wes Breckenridge.

In 2022 he finished 2nd out of five candidates in the Republican primary for the 46th district.

== Electoral history ==
*incumbent

Election	Political result	Candidate	Party	Votes	%
Iowa House of Representatives nominating convention, 2010; District 41; Turnout: 15 delegates casting 6,446 votes	Democratic	Dan Kelley	Democratic	8 delegates casting 3,326 votes	
Iowa House of Representatives nominating convention, 2010; District 41; Turnout: 15 delegates casting 6,446 votes	Democratic	Wes Breckenridge	Democratic	7 delegates casting 3,120 votes	
Iowa House of Representatives nominating convention, 2010; District 41; Turnout: 15 delegates casting 6,446 votes	Democratic	Tracy Doonen	Democratic	0 delegates casting 0 votes	
Iowa House of Representatives general elections, 2010; District 41; Turnout: 11,945	Democratic hold	Dan Kelley	Democratic	5,869	49.13%
Iowa House of Representatives general elections, 2010; District 41; Turnout: 11,945	Democratic hold	Gabriel Swersie	Republican	5,595	46.84%
Iowa House of Representatives primary elections, 2012; District 29	Democratic	Dan Kelley*	Democratic	unopposed	
Iowa House of Representatives general elections, 2012; District 29; Turnout: 16,399	Democratic (newly redistricted)	Dan Kelley*	Democratic	9,831	55.07%
Iowa House of Representatives general elections, 2012; District 29; Turnout: 16,399	Democratic (newly redistricted)	Gabe Swersie	Republican	5,927	36.14%

Iowa House of Representatives
Preceded by Paul Bell	41st District; 2011–2013	Succeeded by Jo Oldson
Preceded by Nathan Willems	29th District; 2013–present	Succeeded by Wes Breckenridge
