= 2016 United States Senate election in Iowa =

- November 8, 2016
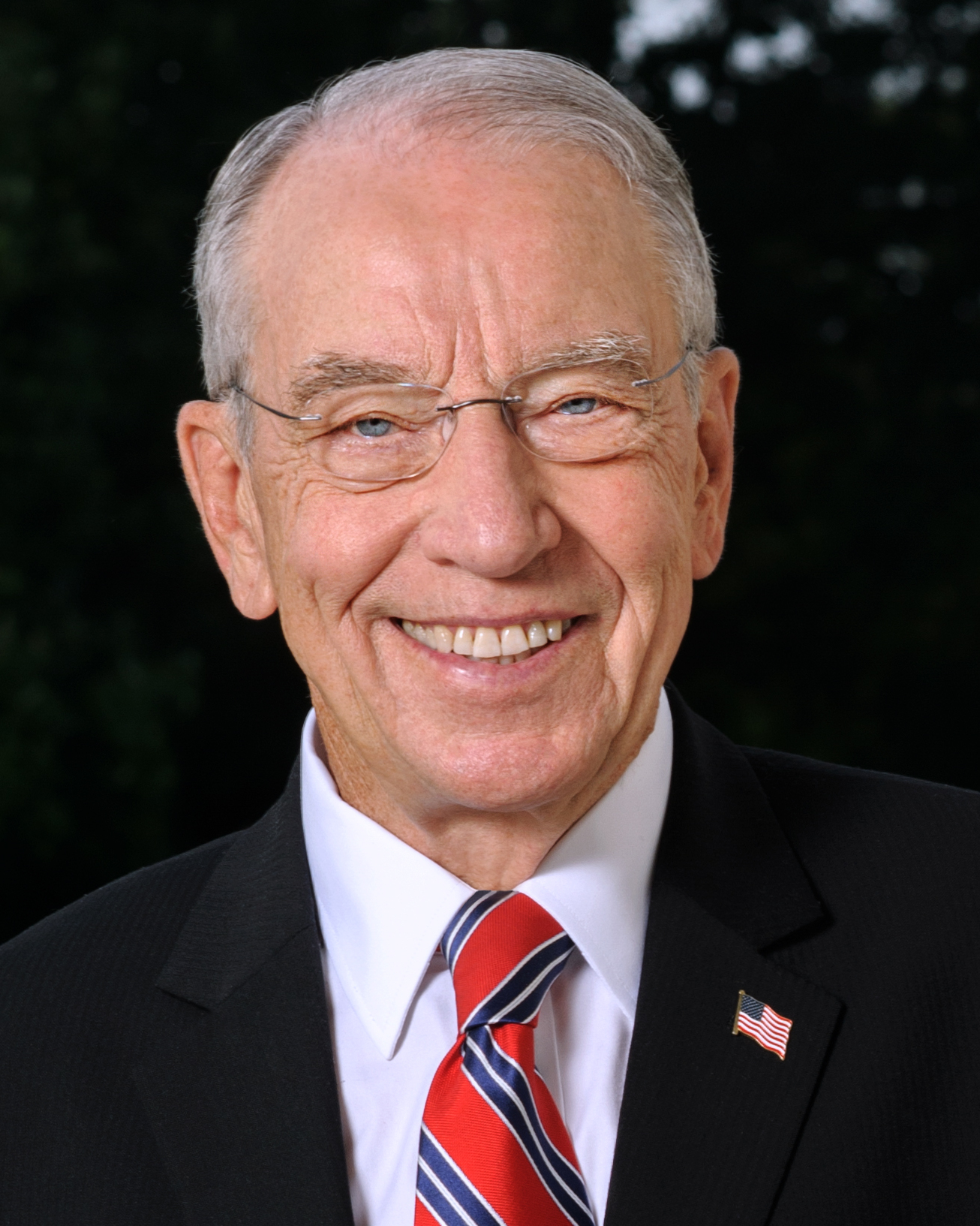

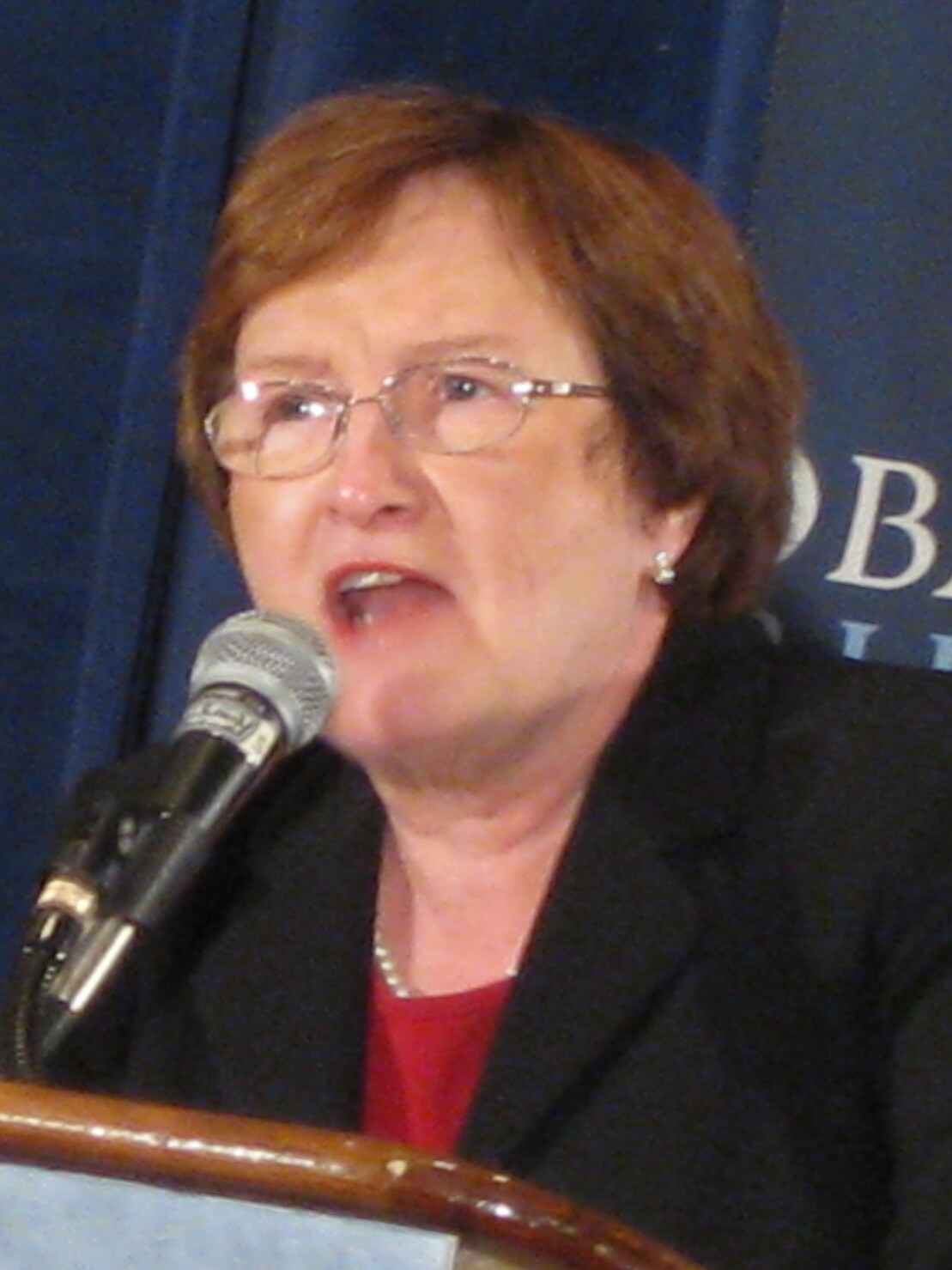
Nominee	Chuck Grassley	Patty Judge
Party	Republican	Democratic
Popular vote	926,007	549,460
Percentage	60.09%	35.66%
- Grassley: 40–50% 50–60% 60–70% 70–80% 80–90% >90% Judge: 40–50% 50–60% 60–70% 70–80% 80–90% Tie: 40–50%
U.S. senator before election
Chuck Grassley
Republican
Elected U.S. Senator
Chuck Grassley
Republican

The 2016 United States Senate election in Iowa was held November 8, 2016, to elect a member of the United States Senate to represent the State of Iowa, concurrently with the 2016 U.S. presidential election, as well as other elections to the United States Senate in other states and elections to the United States House of Representatives and various state and local elections.

Incumbent Republican Senator Chuck Grassley won reelection to a seventh term in office. Primary elections were held June 7, 2016, with Grassley facing no primary opposition, and former lieutenant governor Patty Judge winning the Democratic nomination. Grassley won a seventh term in a sixth consecutive landslide and outperformed Donald Trump, who also won the state that year; nevertheless, this represented Grassley's worst re-election performance at the time since his first race in 1980, until 6 years later when Michael Franken would not only make Grassley fall below 60% of the vote, but also cut his winning percentage in half and flip several counties (namely Black Hawk, Linn, Story and Polk) that Grassley carried in this election.

== Background ==
Republican Chuck Grassley was first elected to the Senate in 1980, defeating Democratic incumbent John Culver by 53% to 46%. Since then, Grassley has been re-elected five times, most recently in 2010, on each occasion taking at least 64% of the vote.

Despite speculation that Grassley, who turned 83 years old in 2016, might retire, he announced in September 2013 that he was "making plans to run for re-election", but added that "it's not taking much of my time. I'm concentrating on doing my job for Iowans."

== Republican primary ==
=== Candidates ===
==== Declared ====
- Chuck Grassley, incumbent senator

==== Withdrawn ====
- Robert Rees, talk radio host

==== Declined ====
- Pat Grassley, state representative and grandson of Chuck Grassley
- Steve King, U.S. Representative
- Tom Latham, former U.S. Representative

=== Results ===
Republican primary results
Party	Candidate	Votes	%
Republican	Chuck Grassley (Incumbent)	90,089	98.36%
Republican	Write-ins	1,500	1.64%
Total votes		91,589	100.00%

== Democratic primary ==
=== Candidates ===
==== Declared ====
- Tom Fiegen, former state senator and candidate for the U.S. Senate in 2010
- Rob Hogg, state senator
- Patty Judge, former lieutenant governor and former Iowa Secretary of Agriculture
- Bob Krause, former state representative, nominee for state treasurer in 1978, candidate for Mayor of Waterloo in 1982 and candidate for the U.S. Senate in 2010

==== Withdrawn ====
- Ray Zirkelbach, former state representative

==== Declined ====
- Christie Vilsack, former First Lady of Iowa and nominee for Iowa's 4th congressional district in 2012
- Tom Vilsack, United States Secretary of Agriculture and former governor of Iowa
- Chet Culver, former governor of Iowa
- Michael Gronstal, Majority Leader of the Iowa Senate and Chairman of the Democratic Legislative Campaign Committee
- Dave Loebsack, U.S. Representative (running for re-election)
- Andy McGuire, chairwoman of the Iowa Democratic Party and candidate for lieutenant governor in 2006
- Tyler Olson, former state representative, former chairman of the Iowa Democratic Party, and candidate for governor in 2014

=== Polling ===
Poll source	Date(s) administered	Sample size	Margin of error	Patty Judge	Rob Hogg	Bob Krause	Tom Fiegen	None/Other	Undecided
Des Moines Register	May 30 – June 2, 2016	542	± 4.2%	42%	25%	6%	5%	6%	15%
KBUR-AM 1490	May 31 – June 1, 2016	1,361	± 3.0%	37%	31%	3%	6%	–	23%

=== Results ===
Results by county: Fiegen—30–40% Hogg—60–70% Hogg—50–60% Hogg—40–50% Hogg—30–40% Judge—80–90% Judge—70–80% Judge—60–70% Judge—50–60% Judge—40–50%

Democratic primary results
Party	Candidate	Votes	%
Democratic	Patty Judge	46,322	47.62%
Democratic	Rob Hogg	37,801	38.86%
Democratic	Tom Fiegen	6,573	6.76%
Democratic	Bob Krause	6,425	6.60%
Democratic	Write-ins	154	0.16%
Total votes		97,275	100.00%

== General election ==
=== Predictions ===
Source	Ranking	As of
The Cook Political Report	Likely R	November 2, 2016
Sabato's Crystal Ball	Safe R	November 7, 2016
Rothenberg Political Report	Safe R	November 3, 2016
Daily Kos	Safe R	November 8, 2016
Real Clear Politics	Safe R	November 7, 2016

=== Debates ===
Dates	Location	Grassley	Judge	Link
October 19, 2016	Sioux City, Iowa	Participant	Participant	

=== Polling ===
View source data.

Poll source	Date(s) administered	Sample size	Margin of error	Chuck Grassley (R)	Patty Judge (D)	Other	Undecided
SurveyMonkey	November 1–7, 2016	1,781	± 4.6%	57%	39%	—	4%
SurveyMonkey	Oct 31–Nov 6, 2016	1,598	± 4.6%	56%	39%	—	5%
Des Moines Register/Selzer	November 1–4, 2016	800	± 3.5%	56%	33%	2%	4%
Emerson College	November 1–3, 2016	700	± 3.6%	60%	32%	4%	5%
Loras College	November 1–3, 2016	500	± 4.4%	53%	37%	1%	8%
SurveyMonkey	Oct 28–Nov 3, 2016	1,469	± 4.6%	57%	39%	—	4%
SurveyMonkey	Oct 27–Nov 2, 2016	1,226	± 4.6%	57%	40%	—	3%
SurveyMonkey	Oct 26–Nov 1, 2016	867	± 4.6%	56%	41%	—	3%
SurveyMonkey	October 25–31, 2016	984	± 4.6%	56%	41%	—	3%
Quinnipiac University	October 20–26, 2016	791	± 3.5%	56%	38%	—	5%
Washington Post/SurveyMonkey	October 8–16, 2016	1,135	± 0.5%	56%	40%	—	5%
Google Consumer Surveys	October 12–14, 2016	523	± 4.2%	56%	41%	—	3%
The Times-Picayune/Lucid	October 7–10, 2016	917	± 3.0%	51%	39%	—	11%
Des Moines Register/Selzer	October 3–6, 2016	642	± 3.5%	53%	36%	2%	6%
Loras College	September 20–22, 2016	491	± 4.4%	54%	37%	—	9%
Quinnipiac University	September 13–21, 2016	612	± 4.0%	55%	43%	—	2%
Monmouth University	September 12–14, 2016	404	± 4.9%	56%	39%	2%	3%
RABA Research	September 6–8, 2016	1,054	± 3.0%	50%	37%	—	13%
Emerson College	Aug 31–Sept 1, 2016	600	± 3.9%	51%	40%	3%	6%
Public Policy Polling	August 30–31, 2016	827	± 3.4%	49%	43%	—	8%
CBS News/YouGov	August 17–19, 2016	987	± 4.0%	45%	38%	1%	15%
Quinnipiac University	August 9–16, 2016	846	± 3.4%	51%	42%	—	6%
Suffolk University	August 8–10, 2016	500	± 4.4%	52%	42%	—	6%
NBC/WSJ/Marist	August 3–7, 2016	899	± 3.3%	52%	42%	1%	5%
CBS News/YouGov	July 13–15, 2016	998	± 4.8%	45%	37%	2%	16%
Monmouth University	July 8–11, 2016	401	± 4.9%	52%	42%	—	6%
NBC/WSJ/Marist	July 5–10, 2016	822	± 3.4%	52%	42%	1%	5%
Loras College	June 24–28, 2016	600	± 4.0%	46%	45%	—	9%
Public Policy Polling	June 22–23, 2016	897	± 3.3%	46%	39%	—	14%
Public Policy Polling	June 9–13, 2016	630	± 3.9%	48%	41%	—	11%

Hypothetical polling

with Rob Hogg

Poll source	Date(s) administered	Sample size	Margin of error	Chuck Grassley (R)	Rob Hogg (D)	Undecided
Public Policy Polling	January 8–10, 2016	1,901	± 2.3%	52%	28%	19%
Public Policy Polling	December 10–13, 2015	1,426	± 2.6%	54%	29%	17%
Public Policy Polling	October 30–November 1, 2015	1,668	± 2.4%	53%	29%	18%
Public Policy Polling	August 7–9, 2015	1,500	± 2.5%	52%	28%	20%

with Tom Fiegen

Poll source	Date(s) administered	Sample size	Margin of error	Chuck Grassley (R)	Tom Fiegen (D)	Undecided
Public Policy Polling	January 8–10, 2016	1,901	± 2.3%	53%	29%	18%
Public Policy Polling	December 10–13, 2015	1,426	± 2.6%	54%	29%	16%
Public Policy Polling	October 30–November 1, 2015	1,668	± 2.4%	54%	30%	16%
Public Policy Polling	August 7–9, 2015	1,500	± 2.5%	53%	30%	17%

with Bob Krause

Poll source	Date(s) administered	Sample size	Margin of error	Chuck Grassley (R)	Bob Krause (D)	Undecided
Public Policy Polling	January 8–10, 2016	1,901	± 2.3%	52%	28%	20%
Public Policy Polling	December 10–13, 2015	1,426	± 2.6%	53%	28%	19%
Public Policy Polling	October 30–November 1, 2015	1,668	± 2.4%	52%	28%	21%
Public Policy Polling	August 7–9, 2015	1,500	± 2.5%	51%	29%	20%

with Tom Vilsack

Poll source	Date(s) administered	Sample size	Margin of error	Chuck Grassley (R)	Tom Vilsack (D)	Undecided
Public Policy Polling	September 25–28, 2014	1,192	± 2.8%	51%	42%	7%
Public Policy Polling	May 15–19, 2014	914	± 3.3%	49%	39%	12%
Public Policy Polling	February 20–23, 2014	869	± 3.3%	48%	41%	11%

=== Results ===
United States Senate election in Iowa, 2016
Party	Candidate	Votes	%	±%
Republican	Chuck Grassley (incumbent)	926,007	60.09%	−4.26%
Democratic	Patty Judge	549,460	35.66%	+2.36%
Libertarian	Charles Aldrich	41,794	2.71%	+0.44%
Independent	Jim Hennager	17,649	1.15%	N/A
Independent	Michael Luick-Thrams	4,441	0.29%	N/A
n/a	Write-ins	1,685	0.11%	+0.03%
Total votes		1,541,036	100.0%	N/A
Republican hold				

==== By congressional district ====
Grassley won all four congressional districts, including one that elected a Democrat.

District	Grassley	Judge	Representative
1st	58%	38%	Rod Blum
2nd	56%	39%	Dave Loebsack
3rd	58%	37%	David Young
4th	68%	28%	Steve King
