= 1986 United States Senate election in Iowa =

- November 4, 1986
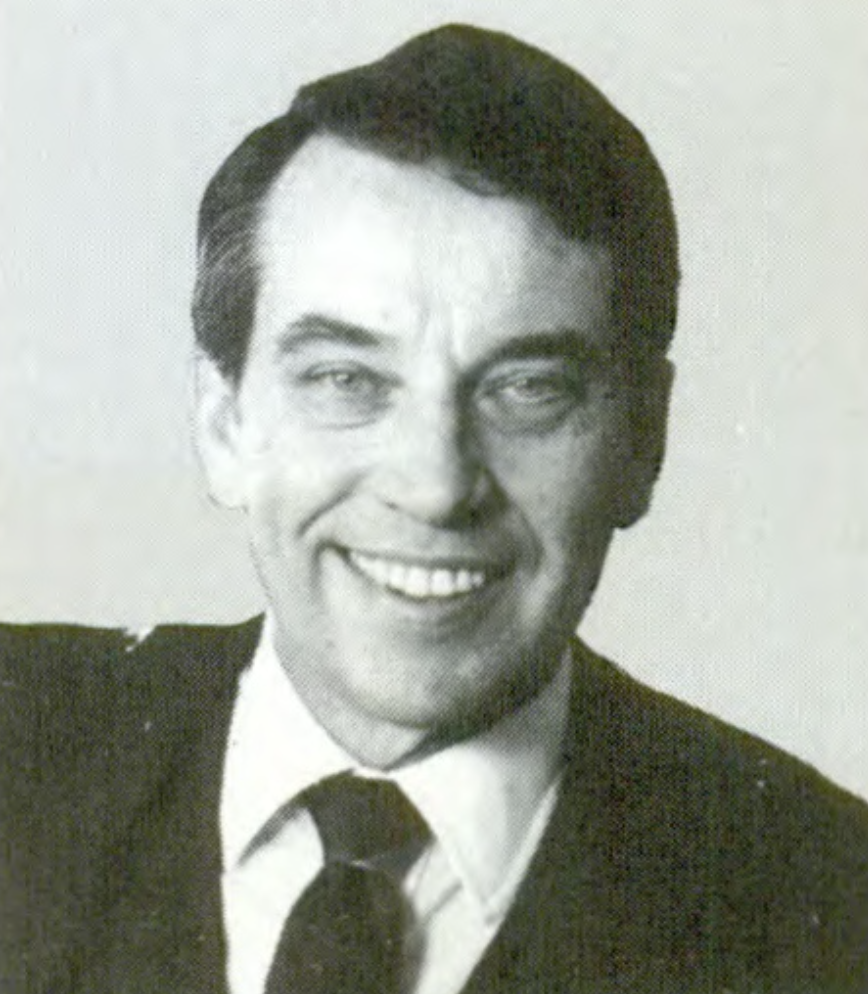

Nominee	Chuck Grassley	John Roehrick
Party	Republican	Democratic
Popular vote	588,880	299,406
Percentage	66.04%	33.57%
- County results Grassley: 50–60% 60–70% 70–80% 80–90% Roehrick: 40–50%
U.S. senator before election
Chuck Grassley
Republican
Elected U.S. Senator
Chuck Grassley
Republican

The 1986 United States Senate election in Iowa was held November 4, 1986. Incumbent Republican United States Senator Chuck Grassley won re-election to a second term, defeating Democratic nominee, attorney John P. Roehrick in a landslide. This would be the last time that Grassley lost a county until 2010 when Roxanne Conlin flipped Johnson County.

== Democratic primary ==
=== Candidates ===
- John P. Roehrick, attorney
- Juan Cortez

=== Results ===
Democratic primary results
Party	Candidate	Votes	%
Democratic	John P. Roehrick	88,347	83.83%
Democratic	Juan Cortez	16,987	16.12%
Democratic	Write-ins	60	0.06%
Total votes		105,394	100.00%

== Republican primary ==
=== Candidates ===
- Chuck Grassley, incumbent United States Senator

=== Results ===
Republican primary results
Party	Candidate	Votes	%
Republican	Chuck Grassley (Incumbent)	108,370	99.96%
Republican	Write-ins	38	0.04%
Total votes		108,408	100.00%

== General election ==
=== Results ===
United States Senate election in Iowa, 1986
Party	Candidate	Votes	%	±%
Republican	Chuck Grassley (Incumbent)	588,880	66.04%	+12.55%
Democratic	John P. Roehrick	299,406	33.57%	−11.97%
Independent	John Masters	3,370	0.38%	
Write-ins		106	0.01%	
Majority		289,474	32.46%	+24.51%
Turnout		891,762		
Republican hold		Swing		

== See also ==
- 1986 United States Senate elections
