= 1982 Iowa gubernatorial election =

- November 2, 1982
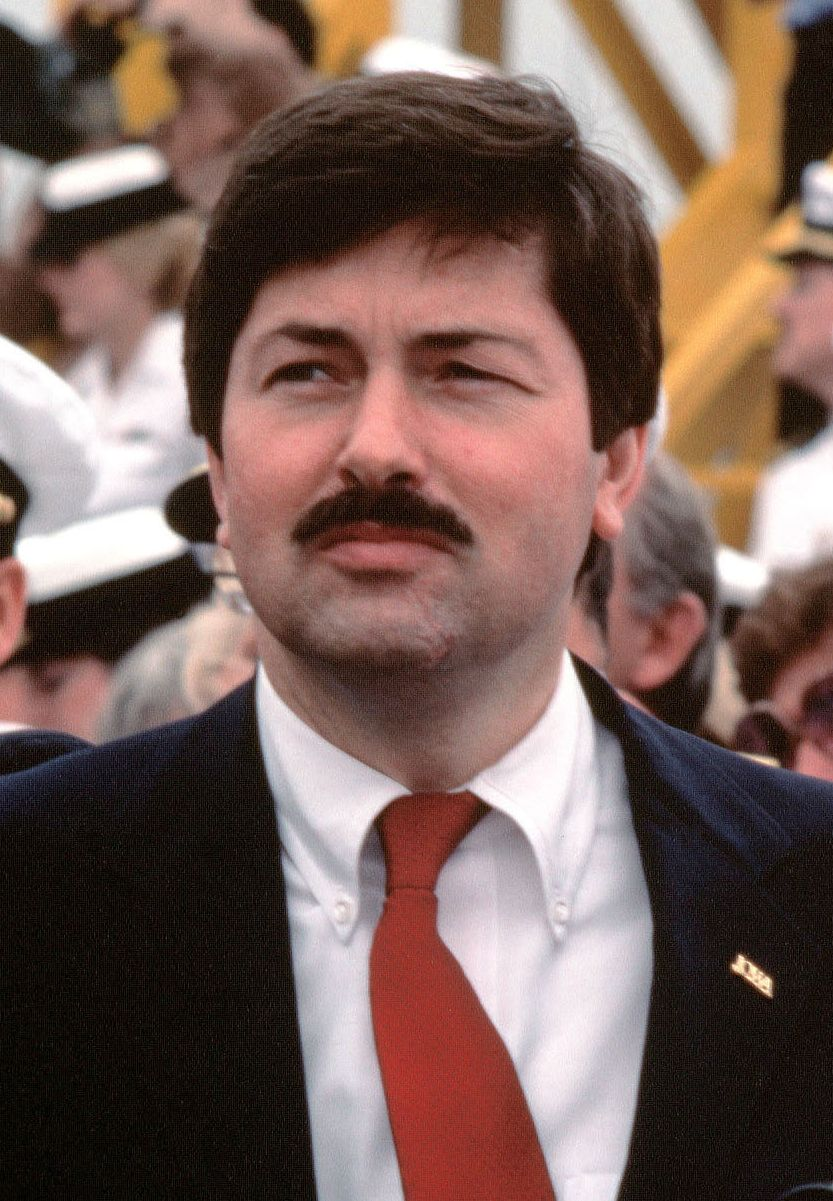

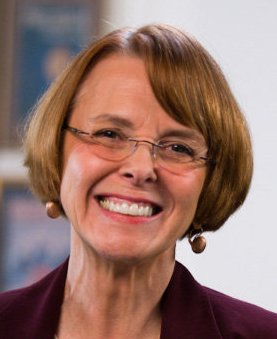
Nominee	Terry Branstad	Roxanne Conlin
Party	Republican	Democratic
Popular vote	548,313	483,291
Percentage	52.81%	46.55%
- County results Branstad: 40–50% 50–60% 60–70% 70–80% Conlin: 40–50% 50–60%
Governor before election
Robert D. Ray
Republican
Elected Governor
Terry Branstad
Republican

The 1982 Iowa gubernatorial election was held on November 2, 1982. The long time incumbent Republican Robert Ray chose not to seek re-election. Republican Lt. Governor Terry Branstad defeated Democratic nominee Roxanne Conlin with 52.81% of the vote.

== Primary elections ==
Primary elections were held on June 8, 1982.

=== Democratic primary ===
==== Candidates ====
- Roxanne Conlin, former United States Attorney for the Southern District of Iowa
- Jerome D. Fitzgerald, former State Representative and nominee for Governor in 1978
- Edward Campbell, former state Democratic Party chairman

==== Results ====
Democratic primary results
Party	Candidate	Votes	%
Democratic	Roxanne Conlin	94,481	48.19
Democratic	Jerome D. Fitzgerald	61,340	31.28
Democratic	Edward Campbell	40,233	20.52
Democratic	Write-ins	17	0.01
Total votes		196,071	100.00

=== Republican primary ===
==== Candidates ====
- Terry Branstad, incumbent Lieutenant Governor

==== Results ====
Republican primary results
Party	Candidate	Votes	%
Republican	Terry Branstad	128,314	99.91
Republican	Write-ins	120	0.09
Total votes		128,434	100.00

== General election ==
=== Candidates ===
Major party candidates

- Terry Branstad, Republican
- Roxanne Conlin, Democratic

Other candidates

- Marcia Farrington, Libertarian
- Jim Bittner, Socialist

=== Results ===
1982 Iowa gubernatorial election
Party	Candidate	Votes	%	±%
Republican	Terry Branstad	548,313	52.81%	−5.51%
Democratic	Roxanne Conlin	483,291	46.55%	+5.57%
Libertarian	Marcia Farrington	3,307	0.32%	−0.15%
Socialist	Jim Bittner	2,767	0.27%	+0.04%
Write-ins		551	0.05%	
Majority		65,022	6.26%	
Turnout		1,038,229		
Republican hold		Swing		
