= 2010 United States Senate election in Iowa =

- November 2, 2010
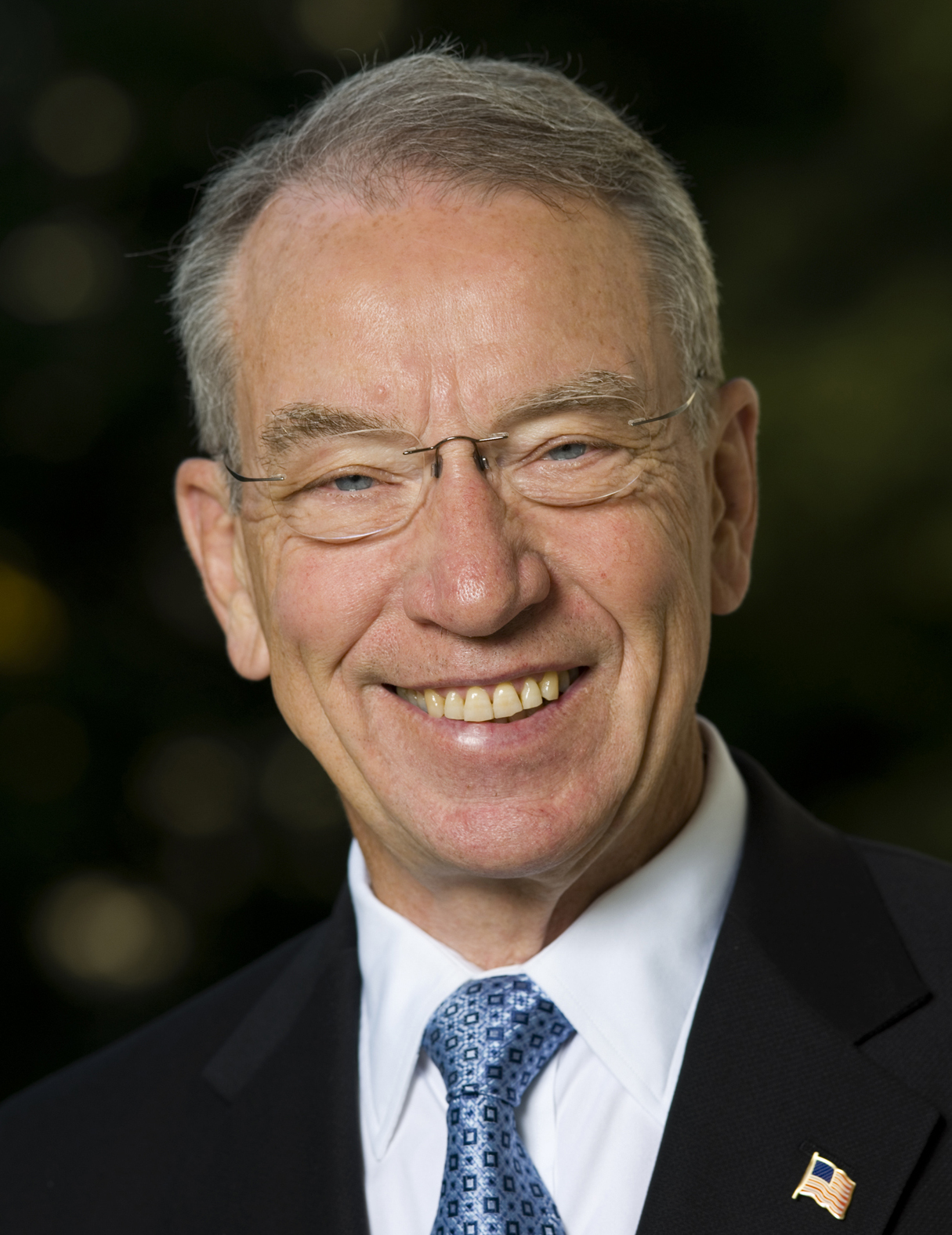

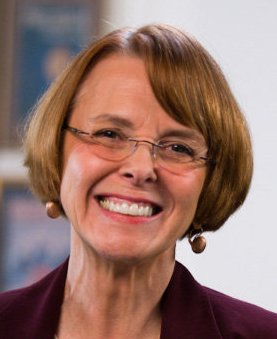
Nominee	Chuck Grassley	Roxanne Conlin
Party	Republican	Democratic
Popular vote	718,215	371,686
Percentage	64.35%	33.30%
- County results Grassley: 50–60% 60–70% 70–80% 80–90% >90% Conlin: 50–60%
U.S. senator before election
Chuck Grassley
Republican
Elected U.S. Senator
Chuck Grassley
Republican

The 2010 United States Senate election in Iowa was held on November 2, 2010, alongside other elections to the United States Senate in other states as well as elections to the United States House of Representatives and various state and local elections in Iowa. The party primary elections were held on June 8, 2010. Incumbent Republican U.S. Senator Chuck Grassley won reelection to a sixth term. This was the first time since 1986 where the losing Democratic United States Senate nominee carried any of the counties in Iowa for this seat.

This was one of the five Republican-held Senate seats up for election in a state that Barack Obama won in the 2008 presidential election.

== Republican primary ==
=== Candidates ===
- Chuck Grassley, incumbent U.S. Senator

=== Results ===
Republican primary results
Party	Candidate	Votes	%
Republican	Chuck Grassley (incumbent)	197,194	98.0%
Republican	Write-ins	3,926	2.0%
Total votes		201,120	100.0%

== Democratic primary ==
=== Candidates ===
- Roxanne Conlin, former United States Attorney for the Southern District of Iowa
- Bob Krause, former Iowa State Representative and nominee for Treasurer in 1978
- Tom Fiegen, former Iowa State Senator

=== Campaign ===
Three Democrats sought the Democratic nomination. Former State Representative and Iowa Department of Transportation official Bob Krause drew attention for implying that Grassley had been in office too long, remarking to supporters in Des Moines: "As a good farmer, Sen. Grassley must recognize that 51 years, or 58 years at the end of his term, is a long time to go without rotating crops." Both Krause and former State Senator Tom Fiegen cited Grassley's support of deregulating the financial services industry as reasons for running. Krause said, "Please remember that Farmer Grassley was one that opened the barn door and let the cow out at AIG," while Fiegen, a bankruptcy lawyer, made reducing unemployment and tightening regulation of the financial services industry the cornerstones of his campaign.

Former Iowa Democratic Party Chairman Michael Kiernan said that he had recruited trial lawyer Roxanne Conlin to challenge Grassley. Kiernan's virtual endorsement of Conlin prior to her announcement drew the ire of party members, as it is counter to party rules when there is more than one candidate from the party competing in a primary race. Conlin had been criticized for being unwilling to debate her primary opponents, and for being unfamiliar with and unsupportive of her own party's platform.

On health care, Fiegen and Krause supported a public option, while Conlin didn't state a position, which she had been criticized for. Krause and Feigen claimed she supported supply-side economics. She also displayed an unfamiliarity with the Iowa Democratic Party's platform, repeatedly claiming there was no platform for her to support until after the June 12, 2010 convention.

=== Results ===
Democratic primary results
Party	Candidate	Votes	%
Democratic	Roxanne Conlin	52,715	77.5%
Democratic	Bob Krause	8,728	12.9%
Democratic	Tom Fiegen	6,357	9.4%
Democratic	Write-ins	177	0.2%
Total votes		67,977	100.0%

== General election ==
=== Candidates ===
- Roxanne Conlin (D), former U.S. Attorney
- Chuck Grassley (R), incumbent U.S. Senator
- John Heiderscheit (L), attorney

=== Campaign ===
Incumbent Chuck Grassley started the campaign moderately popular, but his approval ratings dropped somewhat during the campaign. However, the seat continued to be considered to be "Safe Republican" by many sources, with CQ Politics noting that Grassley is "one of Iowa's most durable politicians."

Conlin described herself as a "prairie progressive." She supported the recent landmark case of Varnum v. Brien, which legalized gay marriage in the state. She also supported repeal of "don't ask, don't tell."

Before the election, former political advisor John Maxwell claimed that Grassley would have his toughest race since his first U.S. Senate election in 1980, where he defeated incumbent John Culver with 53% of the vote. Grassley won all of his four re-election bids with nearly 70% of the vote against unknown opponents. Grassley won the election with 64.35% of the vote, which, in fact was his closest election since 1980.

=== Debates ===
Grassley and Conlin agreed to one debate. It was on October 26 on Des Moines radio station WHO and Iowa Public Television.

=== Predictions ===
Source	Ranking	As of
Cook Political Report	Solid R	October 26, 2010
Rothenberg	Safe R	October 22, 2010
RealClearPolitics	Safe R	October 26, 2010
Sabato's Crystal Ball	Safe R	October 21, 2010
CQ Politics	Safe R	October 26, 2010

=== Polling ===
Poll source	Dates administered	Chuck Grassley (R)	Roxanne Conlin (D)
DailyKos/Research 2000	October 12–14, 2009	51%	39%
Rasmussen Reports	January 26, 2010	59%	31%
KCCI-TV	February 15–17, 2010	56%	35%
Rasmussen Reports	February 22, 2010	53%	36%
Rasmussen Reports	March 17, 2010	55%	36%
Rasmussen Reports	April 29, 2010	53%	40%
KCCI	May 3–5, 2010	49%	40%
Public Policy Polling	May 25–27, 2010	57%	31%
Rasmussen Reports	June 14, 2010	54%	37%
Rasmussen Reports	August 5, 2010	55%	35%
Des Moines Register	September 19–22, 2010	61%	30%
Rasmussen Reports	September 22–23, 2010	55%	37%
Des Moines Register	October 26–29, 2010	61%	30%

=== Fundraising ===
Candidate (party)	Receipts	Disbursements	Cash on hand	Debt
Charles Grassley (R)	$5,566,686	$4,962,347	$3,457,651	$6,913,216
Roxanne Conlin (D)	$3,070,816	$2,653,914	$416,901	$100,000
Source: Federal Election Commission

=== Results ===
United States Senate election in Iowa, 2010
Party	Candidate	Votes	%	±%
Republican	Chuck Grassley (incumbent)	718,215	64.35%	−5.83%
Democratic	Roxanne Conlin	371,686	33.30%	+5.43%
Libertarian	John Heiderscheit	25,290	2.27%	N/A
Write-in		872	0.08%	N/A
Total votes		1,116,063	100.0%	
Republican hold				

==== Counties that flipped from Republican to Democratic ====
- Johnson (largest city: Iowa City)
