= Tom Fiegen =

American attorney and politician

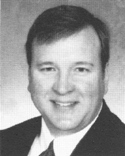

Member of the Iowa Senate from the 20th district
- In office January 8, 2001 – January 12, 2003
- Preceded by: Jack Rife
- Succeeded by: John Putney

Personal details
- Born: Thomas Louis Fiegen; October 2, 1958 (age 68) Mitchell, South Dakota, U.S.
- Party: Democratic
- Education: Kansas State University (B.S.); University of Iowa (M.A., J.D.)
- Website: Campaign website

Thomas Lewis Fiegen (born October 2, 1958) is an American attorney and Democratic Party politician. He served in the Iowa State Senate from 2001 to 2003. He sought the Democratic nomination in the 2010 U.S. Senate election in Iowa but came in third against Roxanne Conlin who won the primary, with Bob Krause coming in second. Fiegen again sought the Democratic nomination in the 2016 U.S. Senate election in Iowa, repeating his third-place showing. Fiegen endorsed Bernie Sanders for President prior to Sanders' endorsement of fellow candidate Hillary Clinton.

== Early life and education ==
Fiegen was reared on a family farm in southeastern South Dakota as the eldest of eleven children. He worked on the family farm, raising cattle and hogs, until he graduated from high school; he then began taking classes at South Dakota State University while farming and launching a grain bin construction business with his brothers.

In 1979, rather than continuing at SDSU, Fiegen went to work for the National Farmers Organization in West Fargo, North Dakota. In 1980, he briefly worked for a South Dakota ethanol fuels company before returning to the NFO to work in grain merchandising. He also worked as an apprentice electrician before returning to collegiate study.

Fiegen graduated from Kansas State University in 1984, majoring in speech and agricultural economics. He subsequently earned a Master of Arts degree in economics and a J.D. degree, both from the University of Iowa.

== Career ==
He is a bankruptcy lawyer specializing in farms and small businesses; he has operated his own legal practice since 1996.

== Family ==
Fiegen has four grown children, Maureen (33), Kathryn (31), Paul (28), and Theresa (25). All four of his children attended Iowa State University, and all but Maureen remain in Iowa.
