= United States Senate Caucus on International Narcotics Control =

Congressional drugs standing committee

Senate Narcotics Caucus
Caucus
- Active United States Senate; 119th Congress

History
- Formed: August 16, 1985

Leadership
- Chair: John Cornyn (R); Since January 3, 2025
- Ranking Member: Sheldon Whitehouse (D); Since January 3, 2025

Structure
- Seats: 7 members
- Political parties: Majority (4): Republican (4); Minority (3): Democratic (3)

Website
- www.drugcaucus.senate.gov

The United States Senate Caucus on International Narcotics Control (also known as the Senate Narcotics Caucus) is a U.S. congressional caucus created to monitor and encourage the U.S. government and private programs seeking to expand international cooperation against drug abuse and narcotics trafficking, and promote international compliance with narcotics control treaties, including eradication.

As a formal organization of the United States Senate, the Caucus has the status of a standing committee. It has subpoena power and is authorized to take testimony of witnesses and to produce books, records, papers, and documents that it deems necessary. In the past it has dealt with international cooperation, eradication, trafficking, interdiction, border control, drug strategies, assessments of federal programs, and money laundering issues.

The Caucus has held numerous hearings over the years and has issued a number of reports on U.S. narcotics control policy. The primary responsibilities of the INCC have involved monitoring of compliance with international narcotics control treaties and agreements, and oversight of U.S. counter narcotics policy and activities.

== Establishment ==
The United States Senate Caucus on International Narcotics Control was originally called the United States Commission on International Narcotics Control, when it was established on August 16, 1985, by the Foreign Relations Authorization Act for fiscal 1986 and 1987.

Pursuant to the Legislative Branch Appropriations Act of 1986 (Pub. L. 99–151), the name of the Commission was changed to the United States Senate Caucus on International Narcotics Control, effective November 13, 1985. (The House of Representatives had requested the name change because it would more accurately reflect the membership of the group, given that no House Members were to be appointed to it.)

== Membership ==
The group's authorizing legislation (Pub. L. 99–93) provided that the Commission draw its membership from the Senate and from experts in the private sector. Specifically, the group was to be composed of 12 members, seven Members of the U.S. Senate appointed by the President of the Senate, and five members from the private sector appointed by the President of the United States. Four of the seven Senators, including one designated as chair, were to be selected from the majority party after consultation with the Majority Leader, and three, including the Member designated as co-chair, were to be selected from the minority party, after consultation with the Minority Leader. The five Commission members selected from the private sector were to be appointed by the President after consultation with the Members of the appropriate congressional committees.

The appointment of private citizens was discontinued after 1987 in accordance with the group's redesignation as the U.S. Senate Caucus on International Narcotics Control.

== Committee leadership ==
=== Chairs ===
Name	Party	State	Start	End
Chuck Grassley	Republican	Iowa	1985	1987
Joe Biden	Democratic	Delaware	1987	1995
Chuck Grassley	Republican	Iowa	1995	2001
Joe Biden	Democratic	Delaware	2001	2003
Chuck Grassley	Republican	Iowa	2003	2007
Joe Biden	Democratic	Delaware	2007	2009
Dianne Feinstein	Democratic	California	2009	2015
Chuck Grassley	Republican	Iowa	2015	2019
John Cornyn	Republican	Texas	2019	2021
Sheldon Whitehouse	Democratic	Rhode Island	2021	2025
John Cornyn	Republican	Texas	2025	present

=== Ranking Members ===
Name	Party	State	Start	End
Joe Biden	Democratic	Delaware	1985	1987
Chuck Grassley	Republican	Iowa	1987	1995
Joe Biden	Democratic	Delaware	1995	2001
Chuck Grassley	Republican	Iowa	2001	2003
Joe Biden	Democratic	Delaware	2003	2007
Chuck Grassley	Republican	Iowa	2007	2015
Dianne Feinstein	Democratic	California	2015	2021
John Cornyn	Republican	Texas	2021	2023
Chuck Grassley	Republican	Iowa	2023	2025
Sheldon Whitehouse	Democratic	Rhode Island	2025	present

== Members ==
=== 119th Congress ===
Majority	Minority
John Cornyn, Texas, Chair; Jim Risch, Idaho; Chuck Grassley, Iowa; Bernie Moreno, Ohio	Sheldon Whitehouse, Rhode Island, Co-Chair; Richard Blumenthal, Connecticut; Ben Ray Luján, New Mexico

=== 118th Congress ===
Majority	Minority
Sheldon Whitehouse, Rhode Island, Chair; Richard Blumenthal, Connecticut; Maggie Hassan, New Hampshire; Ben Ray Luján, New Mexico	Chuck Grassley, Iowa, Ranking Member; John Cornyn, Texas; Jim Risch, Idaho

=== 117th Congress ===
Majority	Minority
Sheldon Whitehouse, Rhode Island, Chair; Richard Blumenthal, Connecticut; Maggie Hassan, New Hampshire; Ben Ray Luján, New Mexico	John Cornyn, Texas, Ranking Member; Chuck Grassley, Iowa; Jim Risch, Idaho

=== 116th Congress ===
Majority	Minority
John Cornyn, Texas, Chair; Chuck Grassley, Iowa; Jim Risch, Idaho	Dianne Feinstein, California, Ranking Member; Sheldon Whitehouse, Rhode Island; Jacky Rosen, Nevada

Source: "U.S. Senate: United States Senate Caucus on International Narcotics Control".
