= 1978 Iowa gubernatorial election =

- November 7, 1978
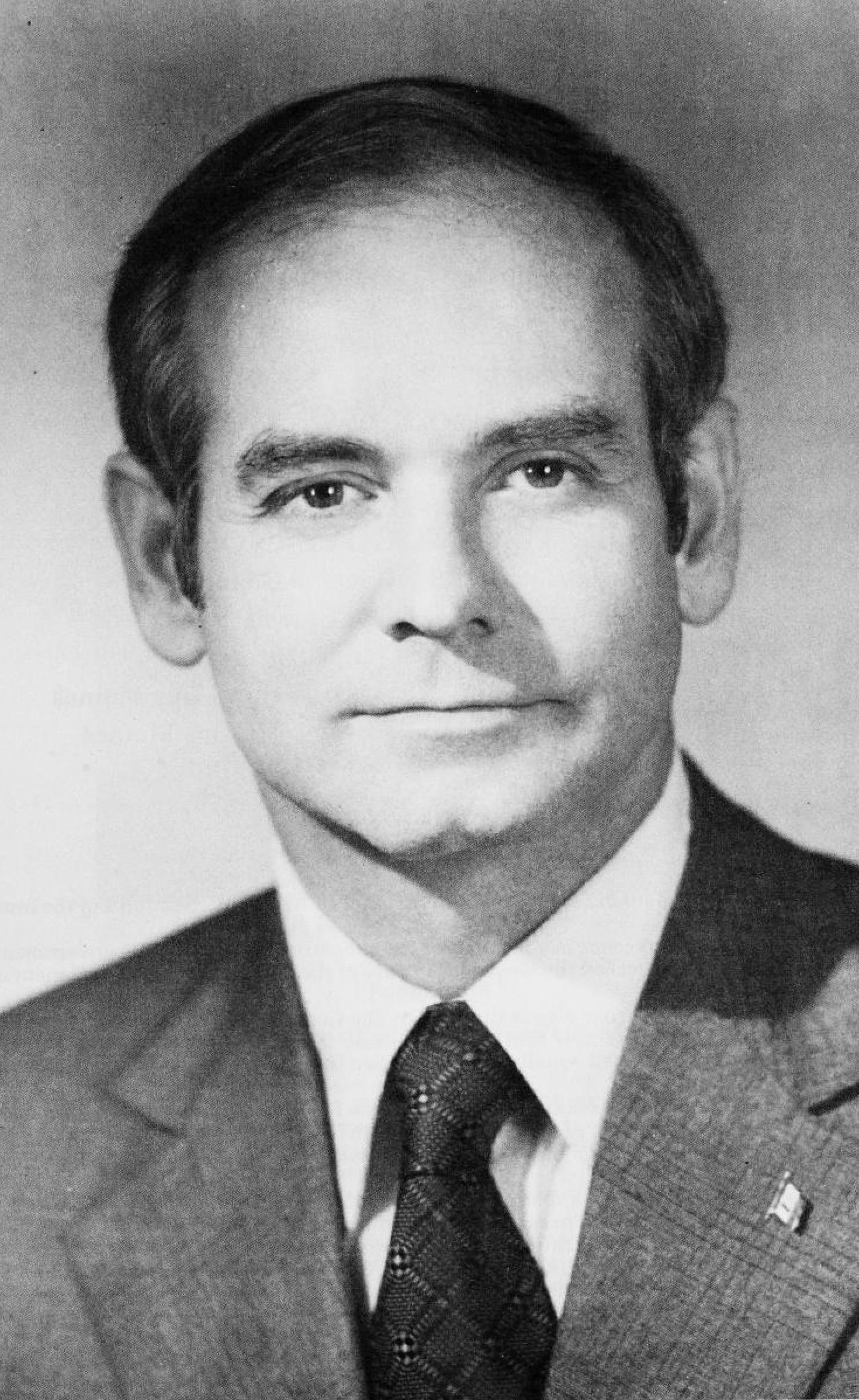

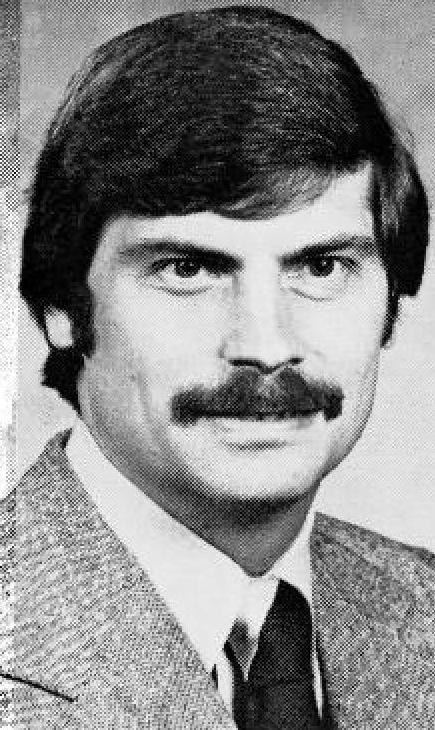
Nominee	Robert D. Ray	Jerome D. Fitzgerald
Party	Republican	Democratic
Popular vote	491,713	345,519
Percentage	58.32%	40.98%
- County results Ray: 50–60% 60–70% 70–80% Fitzgerald: 50–60%
Governor before election
Robert D. Ray
Republican
Elected Governor
Robert D. Ray
Republican

The 1978 Iowa gubernatorial election was held on November 7, 1978. Incumbent Republican Robert D. Ray defeated Democratic nominee Jerome D. Fitzgerald with 58.32% of the vote.

== Primary elections ==
Primary elections were held on June 6, 1978.

=== Democratic primary ===
==== Candidates ====
- Jerome D. Fitzgerald, State Representative
- Tom Whitney
- Warren D. Strait

==== Results ====
Democratic primary results
Party	Candidate	Votes	%
Democratic	Jerome D. Fitzgerald	58,039	55.47
Democratic	Tom Whitney	37,132	35.49
Democratic	Warren D. Strait	9,443	9.03
Democratic	Write-ins	12	0.01
Total votes		104,626	100.00

=== Republican primary ===
==== Candidates ====
- Robert D. Ray, incumbent Governor
- Donovan D. Nelson

==== Results ====
Republican primary results
Party	Candidate	Votes	%
Republican	Robert D. Ray (incumbent)	136,517	87.51
Republican	Donovan D. Nelson	19,486	12.49
Republican	Write-ins	7	0.00
Total votes		156,010	100.00

== General election ==
=== Candidates ===
Major party candidates

- Robert D. Ray, Republican
- Jerome D. Fitzgerald, Democratic

Other candidates

- John Ball, Libertarian
- Joseph Grant, Socialist

=== Results ===
1978 Iowa gubernatorial election
Party	Candidate	Votes	%	±%
Republican	Robert D. Ray (incumbent)	491,713	58.32%	+0.25%
Democratic	Jerome D. Fitzgerald	345,519	40.98%	−0.04%
Libertarian	John Ball	3,947	0.47%	
Socialist	Joseph Grant	1,935	0.23%	
Write-ins		76	0.01%	
Majority		146,194	17.34%	
Turnout		843,190		
Republican hold		Swing		
