= Roxanne Conlin =

American lawyer

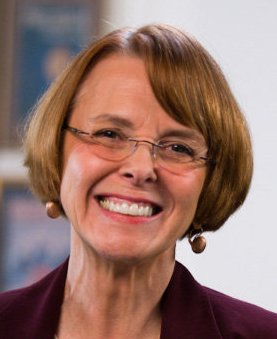

United States Attorney for the Southern District of Iowa
- In office June 6, 1977 – January 17, 1981
- Appointed by: Jimmy Carter
- Preceded by: James Rosenbaum
- Succeeded by: Kermit Anderson

Personal details
- Born: June 30, 1944 (age 81) Huron, South Dakota, U.S.
- Party: Democratic
- Spouse: James Conlin
- Education: Drake University (BA, JD, MPA)

Roxanne Barton Conlin (born June 30, 1944) is an American lawyer who served as United States Attorney for the Southern District of Iowa from 1977 to 1981. A Democrat, she was the party's nominee for Governor of Iowa in 1982 and for United States Senate in 2010, but was not elected to either post.

== Education and early career ==
Conlin was born to Marion W. and Alyce M. Barton on June 30, 1944, in Huron, South Dakota. Conlin and her family moved to Sioux City, Clinton, and then Des Moines, Iowa, in 1958. She attended Drake University in Des Moines, earning a B.A., J.D. and M.P.A. She married James Conlin in 1964 and has four children.

After working as a lawyer for three years, she served as Deputy Industrial Commissioner in Des Moines from 1967 to 1968, then an Assistant Attorney General for the state of Iowa for seven years (1969–1976). She headed the Civil Rights Section of the Iowa Department of Justice.

== Later legal and political career ==
Jimmy Carter appointed Conlin as United States Attorney for the Southern District of Iowa in May, 1977, making her one of the first women ever appointed as a US Attorney. She was confirmed by the Senate in early June, 1977. She was sworn in on June 6, 1977, and received her commission the next day on June 7, 1977. She decided to step down from the court in early 1981.

Conlin has served as the first female president of the Association of Trial Lawyers of America (ATLA). She also founded and was the first chair of the Iowa Women's Political Caucus and served as president of NOW's Legal Defense and Education Fund. Conlin has been involved in the Iowa Democratic Party, serving for a short time as state chair, and ran unsuccessfully for governor of Iowa in 1982.

Conlin currently practices law at Roxanne Conlin & Associates, P.C. in Des Moines.

== 2010 U.S. Senate campaign ==
In October 2009, she announced she was running in the Democratic primary for U.S. Senate in 2010 against Bob Krause and Tom Fiegen. In the primary, she was criticized for being unwilling to debate her primary opponents. Conlin later criticized her Republican opponent in the general election for his unwillingness to debate her. During the primary campaign, Conlin also faced criticism for avoiding questions about her stance on platform issues. Questioned in an April 28 live chat, sponsored by GazetteOnline.com, about disagreements with the Democratic party platform, Conlin answered she could not know the party platform because it would not be adopted until June 2010. When it was pointed out that the current party platform was ratified at the 2008 state convention and is the party platform until superseded, she had no response.

Conlin later lost the November 2010 general election against six-term Republican incumbent Chuck Grassley.

Party political offices
| Preceded by Jerome Fitzgerald | Democratic nominee for Governor of Iowa; 1982 | Succeeded by Lowell Junkins |
| Preceded by Arthur Small | Democratic nominee for U.S. Senator from Iowa (Class 3); 2010 | Succeeded by Patty Judge |
