= Chuck Grassley =

American politician (born 1933)

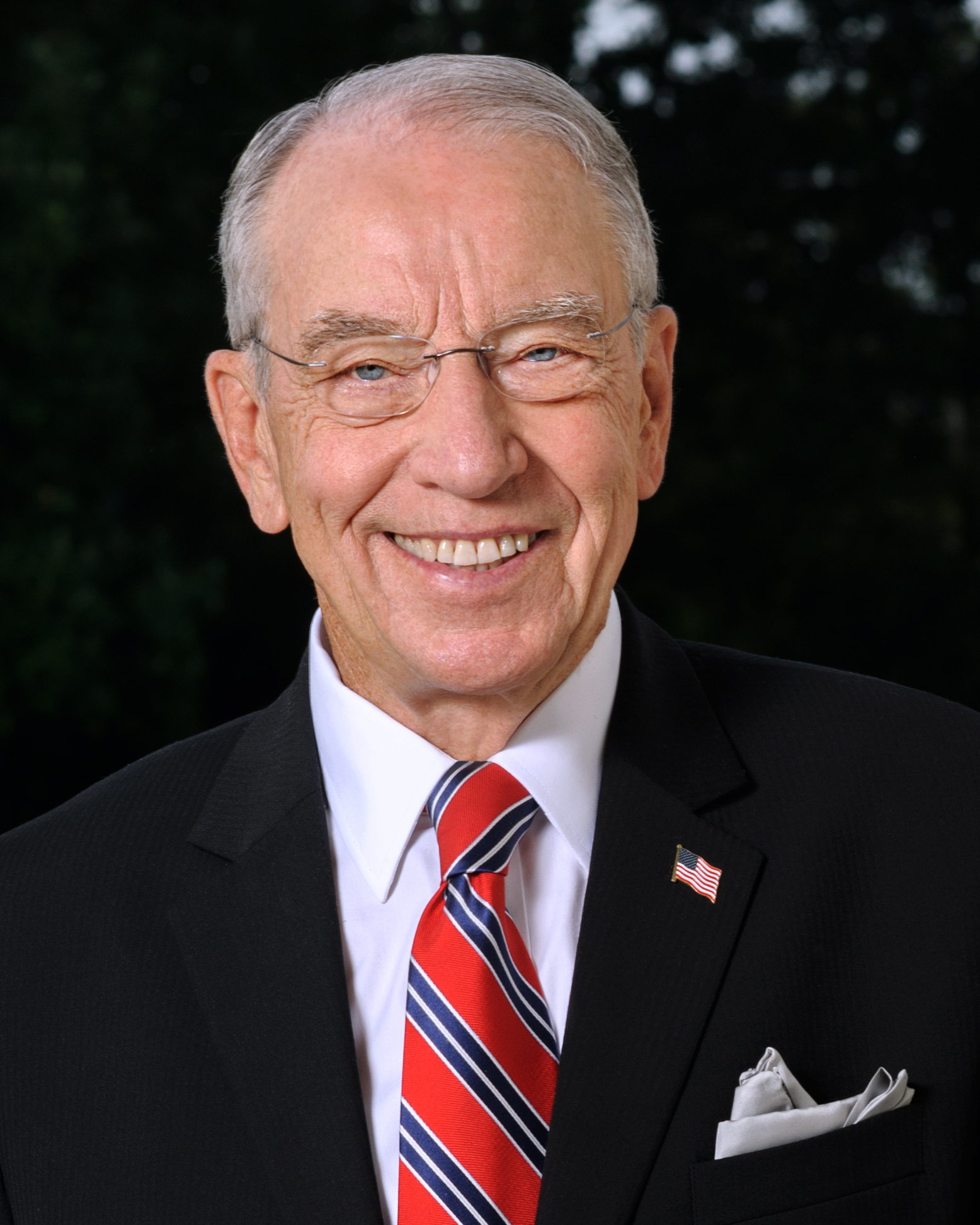
- Official portrait, 2017

President pro tempore emeritus-designate of the United States Senate
- Assuming office January 3, 2027
- Succeeding: Patty Murray

President pro tempore of the United States Senate
- Incumbent
- Assumed office January 3, 2025
- Preceded by: Patty Murray
- In office January 3, 2019 – January 20, 2021
- Preceded by: Orrin Hatch
- Succeeded by: Patrick Leahy

Chair of the Senate Judiciary Committee
- Incumbent
- Assumed office January 3, 2025
- Preceded by: Dick Durbin
- In office January 3, 2015 – January 3, 2019
- Preceded by: Patrick Leahy
- Succeeded by: Lindsey Graham

United States Senator from Iowa
- Incumbent
- Assumed office January 3, 1981 Serving with Joni Ernst
- Preceded by: John Culver
Past Senate positions
President pro tempore emeritus of the United States Senate
In office January 20, 2021 – January 3, 2025
Preceded by	Patrick Leahy
Succeeded by	Patty Murray
Chair of the Senate Finance Committee
In office January 3, 2019 – February 3, 2021
Preceded by	Orrin Hatch
Succeeded by	Ron Wyden
In office January 3, 2003 – January 3, 2007
Preceded by	Max Baucus
Succeeded by	Max Baucus
In office January 20, 2001 – June 6, 2001
Preceded by	Max Baucus
Succeeded by	Max Baucus
Chair of the Senate Narcotics Caucus
In office January 3, 2015 – January 3, 2019
Preceded by	Dianne Feinstein
Succeeded by	John Cornyn
Chair of the Senate Aging Committee
In office January 3, 1997 – January 3, 2001
Preceded by	William Cohen
Succeeded by	John Breaux

Member of the U.S. House of Representatives from Iowa's 3rd district
- In office January 3, 1975 – January 3, 1981
- Preceded by: H. R. Gross
- Succeeded by: T. Cooper Evans

Member of the Iowa House of Representatives
- In office January 12, 1959 – January 3, 1975
- Preceded by: Wayne Ballhagen
- Succeeded by: Raymond Lageschulte
- Constituency: 73rd district (1959–1971); 10th district (1971–1973); 37th district (1973–1975)

Personal details
- Born: Charles Ernest Grassley; September 17, 1933 (age 93) New Hartford, Iowa, U.S.
- Party: Republican
- Spouse: Barbara Speicher (m. 1954)
- Children: 5
- Relatives: Pat Grassley (grandson)
- Education: University of Northern Iowa (BA, MA)
- Website: Senate website Campaign website
- Grassley's voice Grassley supporting John Roberts for Chief Justice of the United States; Recorded September 28, 2005

Charles Ernest Grassley (born September 17, 1933) is an American politician serving as the senior U.S. senator from Iowa, a seat he has held since 1981. Since 2025, he has been the president pro tempore of the United States Senate, a position he also held from 2019 to 2021. He is a member of the Republican Party.

Grassley was first elected to public office in 1958, serving in the Iowa House of Representatives from 1959 to 1975. In 1974, he was elected to represent Iowa's 3rd congressional district in the U.S. House of Representatives. He was elected to the U.S. Senate in 1980 and reelected in 1986, 1992, 1998, 2004, 2010, 2016, and 2022.

During his four decades in the Senate, Grassley has chaired the Finance Committee, the Narcotics Control Caucus, the Judiciary Committee, the Joint Committee on Taxation, and the Aging Committee. When Orrin Hatch retired in 2019, Grassley became the Senate's most senior Republican and its president pro tempore. When Patrick Leahy retired in 2023, Grassley became the dean of the Senate.

Grassley is one of the longest-serving elected politicians in U.S. history, having consistently held elected office since 1959. At 93 years, 1 month and 29 days old, he is the oldest sitting United States senator, the longest-serving Republican in congressional history, the sixth-longest-serving U.S. senator in history, and the seventh-longest serving member of Congress in U.S. history. He served as president pro tempore emeritus of the Senate from 2021 to 2025 before returning as president pro tempore.

== Early life and education ==
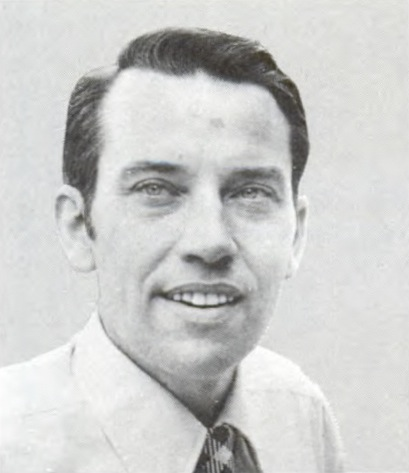
Grassley in 1979

Grassley was born on September 17, 1933 in New Hartford, Iowa. He is the son of Ruth (née Corwin) and Louis Arthur Grassley. He was the third of five children, with two brothers and two sisters.

His paternal grandparents, Gottlieb and Bertha (Waak), emigrated from Germany and used the last name "Graeessle". Gottlieb committed suicide by hanging in April 1900. Gottlieb's son, Charles, also died by suicide, shooting himself in his car on November 4, 1935.

In August 1920, Ruth Grassley was among the first four women to vote in Iowa. Her son did not know about this until many years after her death, when a constituent showed him an article about it. The women had voted in a school election. In 2019, he gave a speech describing her achievement.

Grassley was raised on a farm; his childhood home did not have electricity or indoor plumbing. Grassley's parents were originally Democrats but switched their allegiance to Republican after Franklin D. Roosevelt ran for a third term.

Grassley graduated from New Hartford Community High School in 1951. He was class president three times and valedictorian of his class of 17 students. At Iowa State Teachers College (now the University of Northern Iowa), he earned a Bachelor of Arts in 1955 and a Master of Arts in political science in 1956. He pursued a Ph.D. in political science at the University of Iowa, but did not complete the degree. During his time as a student, Grassley joined the social-professional Alpha Gamma Rho fraternity.

In 1955, Grassley's brother Louis Grassley Jr. died as a result of a traffic accident in New Hartford. His brother Kenneth died in 2001 and his sister Lois in 2006. Chuck became the last surviving Grassley sibling in 2014, when his sister Genevieve died.

== Early political career ==
While he was at the Teachers College, Grassley had a job in Waterloo running an IBM machine. In the 1950s, he worked in factories in Iowa, first as a sheet metal shearer at Universal Hoist Company in Waterloo. He worked in an assembly line at Waterloo Register Company from 1961 until it closed in 1971. From 1967 to 1968, he taught at Charles City College.

=== State House and U.S. House ===
Grassley first ran to represent Butler County in the Iowa House in 1956, announcing his candidacy in February 1956. He ran in the Republican primary against Wayne W. Ballhagen. Grassley lost with 1,042 votes to Ballhagen's 1,122.

Grassley then ran in 1958 and won, representing parts of Butler County in the Iowa House of Representatives from 1959 to 1975. At 25, he was the youngest member of the Iowa House when he started his career. During his tenure, Grassley released "Grassley Reports", a weekly newsletter on the happenings in the Iowa State House published from 1959 to 1974.

Grassley served in the United States House of Representatives from 1975 to 1981.

== U.S. Senate (1981–present) ==
=== Tenure ===
==== 1980s ====
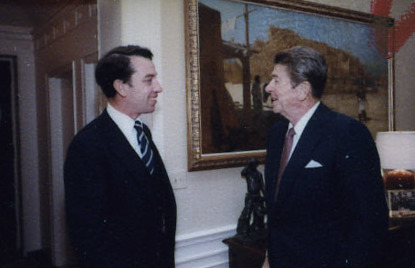
Grassley with President Ronald Reagan in 1981

In November 1981, Grassley was one of 32 senators to sign a letter to President Reagan supporting Director of the Office of Management and Budget David Stockman. In August 1982, while the Reagan administration tried persuading senators to approve legislation authorizing the creation of a radio station for broadcasting to Cuba, Grassley joined fellow Iowa senator Roger Jepsen and Edward Zorinsky in seeking an amendment to the bill barring the Reagan administration from operating Radio Marti on that frequency or other commercial AM frequencies.

In October 1983, Grassley voted against establishing a legal holiday to commemorate Martin Luther King Jr.'s birthday. In 2015, an aide to Grassley said that he voted against the holiday due to an "economic decision both in the cost to the broader economy in lost productivity, and the cost to the taxpayers with the federal government closed". In 2004, Grassley co-sponsored legislation giving King a posthumous award, which became law on October 25 that year.

On November 1, 1984, Grassley signed a one-page citation of contempt of Congress against Attorney General William French Smith due to Smith's not turning over files on an investigation into Navy shipbuilding. Assistant Attorney General Stephen S. Trott called the citation "out of place" since Grassley was not acting at a session of the Judiciary panel he led.

In May 1987, the Senate Appropriations Committee defeated an attempt by Grassley to hasten payments of corn and other feed grain subsidies ahead of the scheduled payment taking place after October 1. Grassley's measure was also designed to unravel an accounting device lawmakers had used to make it appear that they were reducing spending for the incoming fiscal year.

In October 1987, during a press briefing, Grassley accused Reagan of being "asleep at the switch" and botching the handling of Robert Bork's Supreme Court nomination, adding that Bork's nomination had convinced him that the Reagan administration "has been terribly lucky for the last seven years" in other matters, including the economy and foreign policy. Later that month, Grassley likened the groups lobbying against Bork's nomination to the McCarthyism of the 1950s: "The big lie is standard operating procedure for some of these groups. All you have to do is repeat the same outrageous charges, and repeat them so often that people believe they are true." In November, as party leaders of the Senate Judiciary Committee met on the Supreme Court nomination of Douglas H. Ginsburg, Grassley released the text of a letter he intended to send to the American Bar Association suggesting the association was dragging its feet in reviewing Ginsburg's record. After Ginsburg admitted having smoked marijuana, Grassley said, "You like to think people who are appointed to the Supreme Court respect the law." Grassley joined Jesse Helms in resisting the nomination of Anthony Kennedy, Reagan's next choice for the Supreme Court; he indicated that he would have preferred that Reagan instead nominate Judge Pasco Bowman II or Judge John Clifford Wallace. (Note: Immediately after Bork's rejection, Democrats on the Senate Judiciary Committee emphatically declared both Bowman and Wallace unacceptable. Vermont's Patrick Leahy added that if any candidate unacceptable to the Democratic Senate majority were nominated, Senate Democrats would refuse to hold hearings on that nominee and keep the seat open until after the 1988 presidential election.) Grassley expressed distaste for "the people who are committed to changing the judiciary" and taking "the path of least resistance".

In January 1989, as the Senate voted to schedule a vote within a month on a pay increase, Grassley asked how senators would decline federal program increases "come March and April if the first thing out of the box is a pay raise". In February, he was one of six senators to testify against the 50% pay increase scheduled to take effect the next week. In October, he was one of nine senators to vote against legislation intended to outlaw flag burning and other forms of flag defacement and joined Bob Dole and Orrin Hatch, the other two Republicans to vote against the bill, in voicing a preference for a constitutional amendment.

==== 1990s ====
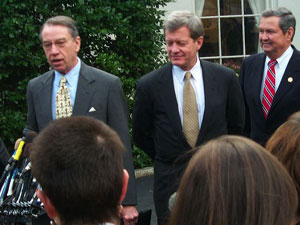
Senators Grassley and Max Baucus (D-MT), and Representative Clay Shaw (R-FL) (left to right) address the media after a meeting at the White House with President Bill Clinton.

In January 1991, Grassley was one of only two Republican senators to vote against joining the international coalition to force Iraq out of Kuwait, the other being Mark Hatfield of Oregon. In August 1991, he became one of six Republicans on the Select Senate Committee on POW-MIA Affairs that would investigate the number of Americans still missing in the aftermath of the Vietnam War following renewed interest. In July 1998, President Bill Clinton listed Grassley among the members of Congress who had made it possible "for me to sign into law today the Internal Revenue Service Restructuring and Reform Act". On February 12, 1999, Grassley was one of 50 senators to vote to convict and remove Bill Clinton from office.

==== 2000s ====
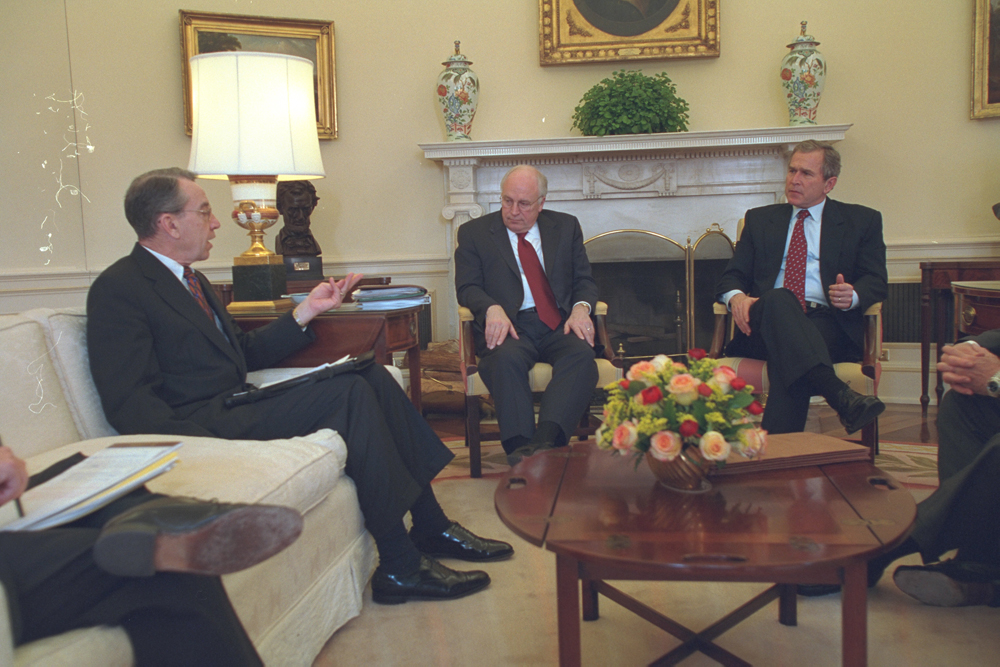
Grassley meets with President George W. Bush and Vice President Dick Cheney in 2001.

In May 2001, Grassley met with Democratic senator Max Baucus over the allocation of finances in tax cuts and both reported they were making progress in reaching a bipartisan deal, Grassley adding that the bill would contain all four of the main elements proposed by the Bush administration and the Senate Finance Committee would modify the components of the Bush proposal.

In August 2002, Grassley sent a letter to president and chief executive of the United Way of America Brian Gallagher requesting a detailed explanation on the overseeing of both finances and management of the organization's affiliates. Grassley also wrote to chief executive of the United Way of the National Capital Area Norman O. Taylor in regards to allegations of affiliates misappropriating money as well as withholding information the board needed to allow its conducting of oversight.

As a senior member of the Senate Finance Committee, Grassley has spearheaded many probes into alleged misuse and lack of accountability of federal money. In July 2007, a Grassley-commissioned report was released claiming that more than $1 billion in farm subsidies were sent to deceased individuals. Grassley was called a "Taxpayer Super Hero" in 2014 by the council for Citizens Against Government Waste. He received a 100 percent rating from the group that year and has a lifetime rating of 78 percent. Grassley was ranked the 5th most bipartisan senator of the 114th United States Congress and the 7th most bipartisan Senator in the first session of the 115th Congress by the Bipartisan Index, a metric created by the Lugar Center for the Lugar Center and Georgetown's McCourt School of Public Policy to rank members of the United States Congress by their degree of bipartisanship.

In February 2004, Grassley released an internal report composed by the FBI in 2000 that examined 107 instances of either serious or criminal misconduct by its agents over a 16-year period. In a letter to the FBI, Grassley called the report "a laundry list of horrors with examples of agents who committed rape, sexual crimes against children, other sexual deviance and misconduct, attempted murder of a spouse, and narcotics violations, among many others" and added that the report's findings raised questions about whether the FBI handled agents "soon enough and rigorously enough".

On June 28, 2006, Grassley proposed legislation intended to curb sex trafficking and sexual slavery by strictly enforcing tax laws, for example by requiring that a Form W-2 be filed for sex workers managed by a pimp or other employer.

Since 1976, Grassley has repeatedly introduced measures that increase the level of taxation on American citizens living abroad, including retroactive tax hikes. Grassley was eventually able to attach an amendment to a piece of legislation that went into effect in 2006, which increased taxes on Americans abroad by targeting housing and living incentives paid by foreign employers and held them accountable for federal taxes, even though they did not currently reside in the United States. Critics of the amendment felt that the move hurt Americans competing for jobs abroad by putting an unnecessary tax burden on foreign employers. Others felt that the move was only to offset the revenue deficit caused by domestic tax cuts of the Bush Administration.

In March 2009, amid a scandal that involved AIG executives receiving large salary bonuses from the taxpayer-funded bailout of AIG, Grassley suggested that those AIG employees receiving large bonuses should follow the so-called 'Japanese example', resign immediately or commit suicide. After some criticism, he dismissed the comments as rhetoric.

In May 2009, Grassley cosponsored a resolution to amend the US Constitution to prohibit flag burning.

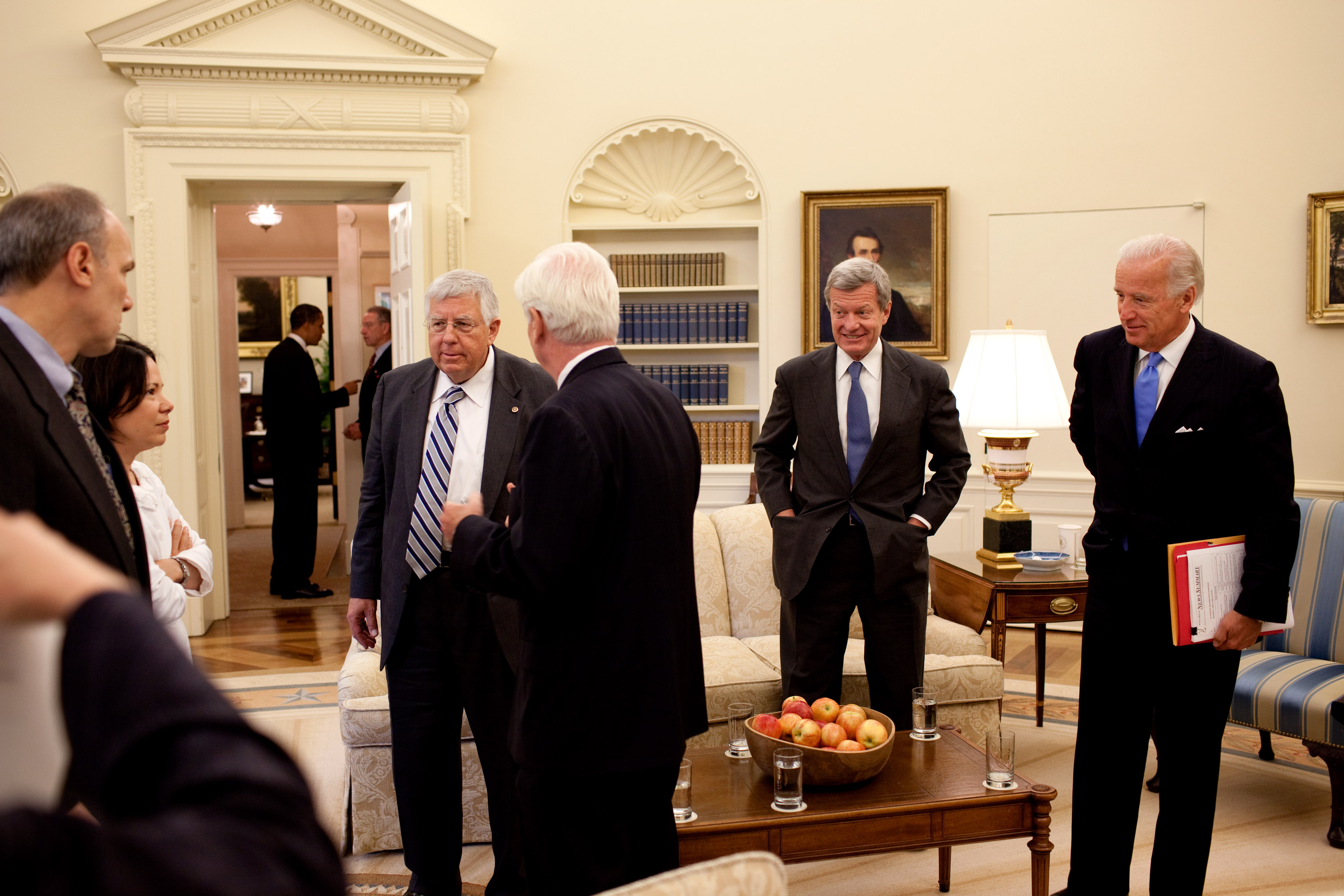
Grassley talking in the background with President Barack Obama at the conclusion of an Oval Office meeting to discuss health care reform in June 2009

When President Barack Obama and the Democratic Party proposed a health reform bill featuring mandated health insurance, Grassley opposed the health insurance mandate, saying that it was a deal breaker. In response to an audience question at an August 12, 2009, meeting in Iowa, about the end-of-life counseling provisions in the House health care bill, H.R. 3200, Grassley said people were right to fear that the government would "pull the plug on grandma". Grassley had previously supported covering end-of-life counseling, having voted for the Medicare Prescription Drug, Improvement, and Modernization Act of 2003, which stated: "The covered services are: evaluating the beneficiary's need for pain and symptom management, including the individual's need for hospice care; counseling the beneficiary with respect to end-of-life issues and care options, and advising the beneficiary regarding advanced care planning." In December 2009, he voted against the Patient Protection and Affordable Care Act (commonly called Obamacare or the Affordable Care Act). It was later reported that Grassley had notified Obama that he would vote against the Affordable Care Act even had the bill been modified to include all of the proposed modifications Grassley had proposed.

==== 2010s ====
In January 2010, Grassley was one of seven Senate Republicans to sign a letter warning the White House about their serious reservations with Director of the Transportation Security Administration nominee Erroll Southers due to conflicting accounts Southers gave the Senate about his previous tapping of databases for information about his ex-wife's boyfriend in the late 1980s.

In December 2010, Grassley was one of 26 senators who voted against the ratification of New START, a nuclear arms reduction treaty between the United States and Russian Federation obliging both countries to have no more than 1,550 strategic warheads as well as 700 launchers deployed during the next seven years along with providing a continuation of on-site inspections that halted when START I expired the previous year. It was the first arms treaty with Russia in eight years.

In April 2013, Grassley opposed a gun control amendment authored by senators Joe Manchin and Pat Toomey, and instead proposed alternative legislation to increase prosecutions of gun violence and increase reporting of mental health data in background checks.

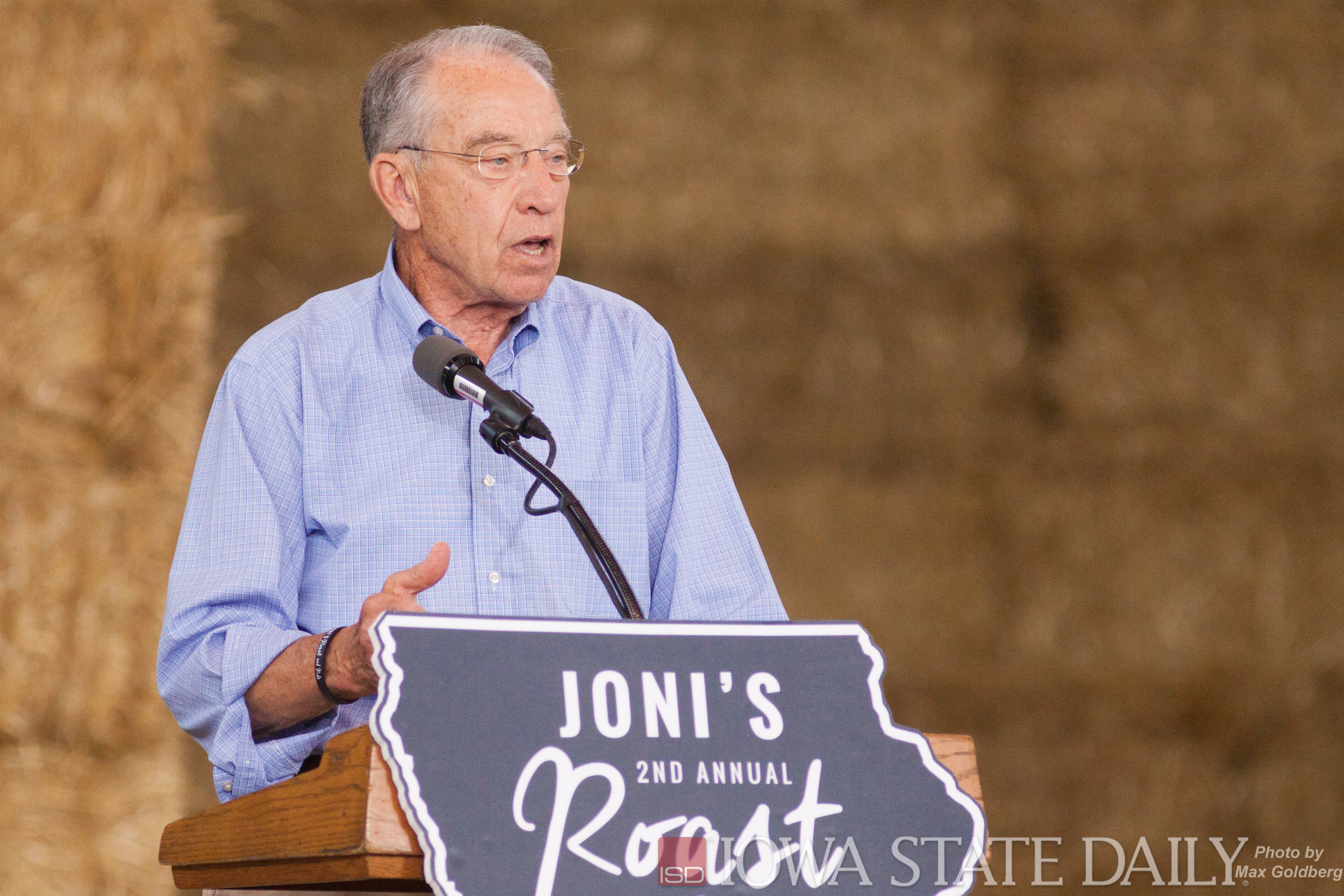
Senator Grassley in 2016

On March 9, 2015, Grassley was one of 47 senators to sign a letter to Iran led by Tom Cotton to rebuke the Joint Comprehensive Plan of Action. In June 2015, Grassley introduced legislation to help protect taxpayers from alleged abuses by the Internal Revenue Service. The legislation was proposed in response to recent events involving alleged inappropriate conduct by employees at the IRS but was opposed by Democrats.

Since first taking office in 1981, Grassley has held public meetings in all of Iowa's 99 counties each year, even after losing honorarium payments for them in 1994. This has led to the coinage of the term "full Grassley" to describe a presidential candidate visiting all 99 counties of Iowa before the Iowa caucuses.

In 2018, Grassley suggested that no women were serving on the Senate Judiciary Committee because of the heavy workload. The following week, Grassley added that he would "welcome more women" to serve on the Committee "because women as a whole are smarter than most male senators. And they work real hard, too".

In July 2018, after President Donald Trump nominated Brett Kavanaugh to the Supreme Court, Grassley lauded Kavanaugh as "one of the most qualified Supreme Court nominees to come before the Senate", and said that critics of Kavanaugh should lessen their confidence in how he would vote given past surprises in voting by members of the Court.

In 2016, Senate Republicans refused to consider Obama's nomination of Merrick Garland to the Supreme Court. At the time, Grassley said that the "American people shouldn't be denied a voice" in the nomination, which was "too important to get bogged down in politics". In 2020, after a Supreme Court vacancy arose due to Justice Ruth Bader Ginsburg's death, Grassley supported a prompt vote on Trump's nominee, backing the decision of "the current chairman of the Judiciary Committee and the Senate Majority Leader".

==== 2020s ====
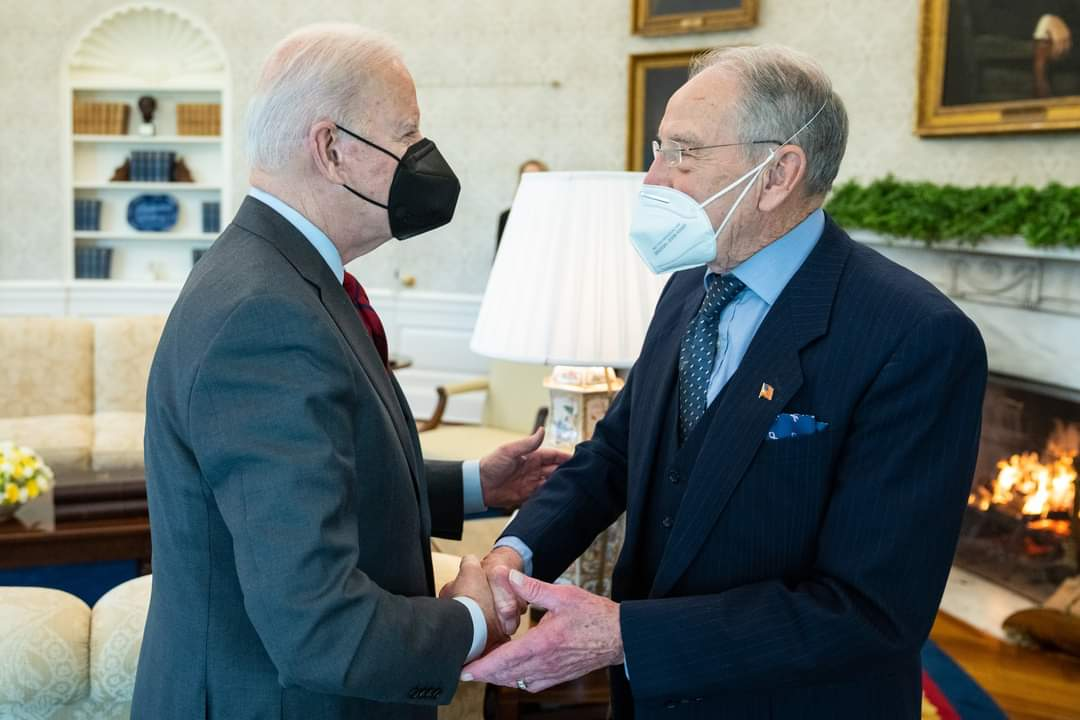
Grassley meeting with President Joe Biden, February 2022

Grassley was participating in the certification of the 2021 United States Electoral College vote count when Trump supporters attacked the U.S. Capitol. He was removed from the Senate chamber and taken to a secure location when rioters entered the building. In the wake of the attack, Grassley said that Trump "displayed poor leadership in his words and actions, and he must take responsibility". He said efforts to impeach Trump would risk "further disunity" and that "the country must take steps to tone down political rhetoric and mend divisions". In response, The Gazette editorial board wrote that Grassley and other Iowa Republicans "must reckon with why they did the wrong thing for so long".

On January 3, 2023, Grassley became the Dean of the United States Senate.

=== Senate record for consecutive votes ===
As of November 2015, Grassley had cast 12,000 votes, and as of July 2012, he had missed only 35 votes in his Senate career. In January 2016, he set a record for the most times without a missed roll-call vote, having not missed one since July 1993, when he was touring Iowa with President Bill Clinton to survey flood damage. In November 2020, this streak came to an end after over 27 years and 8,927 votes when he quarantined after being exposed to COVID-19. Grassley broke Senator William Proxmire's record for most time without a missed vote, but Proxmire holds the record for most consecutive roll-call votes, with 10,252. Senator Susan Collins surpassed Grassley's record in 2024.

=== Committee assignments ===
Grassley's committee assignments for the 119th Congress are as follows:

- Committee on Agriculture, Nutrition, and Forestry
  - Subcommittee on Commodities, Markets and Trade
  - Subcommittee on Rural Development and Energy
- Committee on Finance
  - Subcommittee on Fiscal Responsibility and Economic Growth
  - Subcommittee on Health Care
  - Subcommittee on Taxation and IRS Oversight
- Committee on the Budget
- Committee on the Judiciary (Chair)
  - Subcommittee on Competition Policy, Antitrust and Consumer Rights
  - Subcommittee on Criminal Justice and Counterterrorism
  - Subcommittee on Federal Courts, Oversight, Agency Action and Federal Rights
  - Subcommittee on Immigration, Citizenship and Border Safety
- Joint Committee on Taxation (Chair: 2004-2007, 2020-2023)
- United States Senate Caucus on International Narcotics Control (Chair: 1985-1987, 1995-2001, 2003-2007, 2015-2019)

=== Caucus membership ===
- Senate Republican Conference
- Rare Disease Caucus
- Senate Taiwan Caucus

== Political positions ==
=== Abortion ===
Grassley has said that he considers himself pro-life and has expressed concern about the potential for abortions to be paid for with federal funds. In December 1981, he voted for a proposed constitutional amendment by Orrin Hatch that would allow both Congress and the states to ban or regulate abortion. In 2019, he co-sponsored reintroducing the Pain-Capable Unborn Child Protection Act. Grassley approved of the 2022 overturning of Roe v. Wade, saying it empowered people through their elected representatives to make "commonsense policy decisions".

=== Agriculture ===
In April 2019, Grassley was one of seven senators to sign a letter led by Debbie Stabenow and Joni Ernst to United States secretary of agriculture Sonny Perdue urging the Agriculture Department to implement conservation measures in the 2018 Farm Bill "through a department-wide National Water Quality Initiative, which would build off the existing initiative housed at the Natural Resource Conservation Service".

=== Antitrust ===
In October 2021, Grassley and Senator Amy Klobuchar introduced the American Innovation and Choice Online Act (S.2992) . The legislation aims to prevent Big Tech companies from engaging in anti-competitive behavior by "self-preferencing" their products. Grassley voted to confirm Jonathan Kanter as Assistant Attorney General for the Department of Justice Antitrust Division.

=== Energy and environment ===
Grassley has expressed concern about the impact of regulations by the Environmental Protection Agency on farming. He said the EPA has a "public relations problem" with "the ethanol industry, corn farmers and [himself]", and that the EPA has "screwed" farmers with 31 biofuel exemptions. On December 19, 2019, after the EPA withdrew a new Renewable Fuel Standard (RFS) rule, Grassley criticized the EPA for "playing games and not helping President Trump with farmers".

In 1992, Grassley authored EPACT 1992, which created the federal wind energy tax credit.

In 2005, Grassley authored the tax title of EPACT 2005 when he was chairman of the Senate Finance Committee. On June 28, 2005, he voted for the bill. On June 19, 2007, Grassley helped expand tax incentives that produces energy from alternative sources including ethanol, wind, biomass, and biodiesel. On June 21, 2007, Grassley voted for the Energy Independence and Security Act of 2007, which expanded other energy tax incentives through 2013.

In September 2015, Grassley received the Dr. Harold D. Prior "Friend of Iowa Wind Energy" award from the Iowa Wind Energy Association for his commitment to supporting wind energy development in Iowa.

In 2017, the Environmental Working Group stated that Grassley received $367,763 in grain commodity subsidies over 21 years.

Grassley supports federal ethanol subsidies.

In 2017, of the Paris Agreement, Grassley said, "unequal terms put the U.S. economy at a significant disadvantage while letting large economies like China's and India's off the hook". He also said he didn't like that the Senate had not voted on the agreement.

=== Estate taxes ===
Grassley is in favor of repealing the estate tax, which is a tax on inherited assets above $5.5 million for individuals and $11 million for couples. He has argued that the estate tax is potentially ruinous for farmers and small business owners. According to the Des Moines Register, Grassley's argument does not "match the reality found in federal tax data – particularly for Iowa. The estate tax applies to around 5,000 taxpayers across the entire country each year, and very few of them come from Iowa. Of the Iowans subject to the tax, only a fraction are actually farmers, and a vanishingly small number of them face a tax bill requiring them to sell off farmland or other assets... The number of small businesses impacted by the estate tax is similarly small."

=== Fundraising ===
According to the nonpartisan OpenSecrets, as of 2010 the industries that have been the largest contributors to Grassley during his political career are health professionals ($1 million in contributions), insurance industry ($997,674), lawyers/law firms ($625,543), and pharmaceuticals/health products ($538,680). His largest corporate donors have been Blue Cross Blue Shield, Amgen, and Wells Fargo.

=== Gun law ===
In 2010, Grassley had an "A" rating from the NRA Political Victory Fund (NRA-PVF), rising to "A+" ratings and endorsements in 2016 and 2022.

Grassley has argued that gun laws are ineffective without improved mental health care. Grassley opposed the Manchin-Toomey gun control amendment, and instead proposed alternative legislation to increase prosecutions of gun violence and increase reporting of mental health data in background checks.

In 2016, one month after the Orlando nightclub shooting, Grassley proposed legislation to expand state-to-state access to background check data and to make it illegal for government officials to sell criminals guns as part of sting operations. Both proposals were rejected by the Senate. Additionally, he voted against the Democrats' Feinstein Amendment, which would make it illegal to sell guns to individuals on the terror watchlist and a Republican-sponsored bill that expanded funding for background checks.

In early 2017, Grassley sponsored legislation repealing an Obama-era rule that reported Social Security recipients with representative payees to the National Instant Criminal Background Check System (NICS) as prohibited from purchasing firearms. Grassley and disability rights advocates, including the ACLU, argued the rule unfairly stigmatized people with disabilities without due process. After the 2017 Las Vegas shooting, Grassley, as chairman of the Senate Judiciary Committee, said the investigation was "still ongoing" and that he needed "more information before making a decision on a hearing and what it might cover". In 2018, the day after the Parkland high school shooting, Grassley said the government had "not done a very good job" ensuring that people with mental health disqualifications were reported to the FBI's background check system.

=== Health care ===
Grassley opposes the Affordable Care Act and has voted to repeal it. Before its passage, he had supported the individual mandate in health care reform. Grassley engaged in lengthy negotiations with the Obama administration, as it sought health care reform with support from Republican members of Congress. These negotiations produced nothing that Grassley would support, leading Democrats to characterize Grassley's efforts as intended to delay or scupper health care reform rather than produce compromise legislation. In Obama's memoir, he describes an exchange between him and Grassley in the Oval Office as he sought to reach a compromise with Grassley. Obama asked, "If Max [Baucus] took every one of your latest suggestions, could you support the bill?... Are there any changes—any at all—that would get us your vote?", to which Grassley responded, "I guess not, Mr. President."

In July 2017, Grassley said that Senate Republicans should be ashamed of not having repealed the ACA, and that this could result in a loss of their majority in the 2018 elections.

In August 2018, Grassley was one of ten Republican senators to cosponsor legislation intended to protect ACA provisions for people with preexisting conditions. Health experts said the bill did not prevent insurers from excluding coverage for people with preexisting conditions.

=== Marijuana legalization ===
In 2015, Grassley voiced his opposition to a bipartisan senate bill, the Compassionate Access, Research Expansion, and Respect States Act, that would move cannabis from Schedule I to Schedule II. This bill would allow states with medical cannabis laws to legally prescribe it and allow for more research into its medical efficacy. In 2019, along with Democratic U.S. Senators Dianne Feinstein and Brian Schatz, Grassley introduced the Cannabidiol and Marijuana Research Expansion Act, which would expand research into medical marijuana.

=== Israel Anti-Boycott Act ===
In April 2017, Grassley co-sponsored the Israel Anti-Boycott Act (s. 720), which would make it a federal crime for Americans to encourage or participate in boycotts against Israel and Israeli settlements in the West Bank if protesting actions by the Israeli government. In 2019, Grassley was one of 14 Republican senators to sign a letter from Marco Rubio that involved condemning the BDS movement.

=== LGBT rights ===
In 2015, after the Supreme Court ruled same-sex marriage bans unconstitutional in Obergefell v. Hodges, Grassley released a statement saying he believed marriage was between one man and a woman and criticized the court for not leaving the issue up to the states. But in 2022, he said in a statement that he supports same-sex marriage. Despite this, Grassley voted against the Respect for Marriage Act, citing religious liberty concerns and calling the legislation unnecessary.

=== Retirement planning ===
In 2019, Grassley was one of the lead Senate co-sponsors of the SECURE Act of 2019. This bill, which became law as part of the fiscal year 2020 federal appropriations law signed in late December 2019, was intended to incentivize retirement planning, diversify the options available to savers, and increase access to tax-advantaged savings programs including 529 plans.

=== Russian interference in 2016 elections ===
In February 2017, Grassley said that while Russian interference in U.S. elections was "bothersome", the United States did not have clean hands and had, for instance, interfered with the 1948 Italian election.

In January 2018, Grassley and Lindsey Graham made a criminal referral recommending charges against Christopher Steele, the author of the Steele dossier, alleging he had lied to federal authorities. According to The New York Times, "It was not clear why, if a crime is apparent in the F.B.I. reports that were reviewed by the Judiciary Committee, the Justice Department had not moved to charge Mr. Steele already. The circumstances under which Mr. Steele is alleged to have lied were unclear, as much of the referral was classified." The December 2019 DOJ Inspector General report subsequently identified 17 significant errors and omissions in FISA applications that relied on the Steele dossier, and Special Counsel John Durham's May 2023 report concluded the FBI "did not and could not corroborate any of the substantive allegations" in the dossier.

FBI attorney Kevin Clinesmith pleaded guilty to altering a CIA email used in the FISA warrant process. Durham also indicted Michael Sussmann, a former Perkins Coie attorney, on charges of lying to the FBI; Sussmann was acquitted in May 2022. Durham indicted Igor Danchenko, Steele's primary sub-source, on charges of lying to the FBI about his sourcing; Danchenko was acquitted in October 2022.

In January 2018, Senator Dianne Feinstein, the ranking Democrat on the Senate Judiciary Committee, unilaterally released the full transcript of an August 2017 interview the committee had conducted with Glenn Simpson. Simpson is the co-founder of Fusion GPS, which produced the Steele dossier. Grassley said Feinstein's decision was "confounding" and could deter future witnesses. Simpson had requested the transcript's release, alleging that Republicans had selectively leaked portions to portray him negatively.

=== Whistleblowers ===
The author of the Whistleblower Protection Act of 1989, Grassley has campaigned to increase protection and provide support for "whistleblowers". He has supported a number of FBI whistleblowers, including Coleen Rowley, Sibel Edmonds, and Jane Turner, although not supporting Department of Defense whistleblower Noel Koch.

In 2016, Grassley and Senator Patrick Leahy introduced the FBI Whistleblower Protection Enhancement Act, which was signed into law on December 16, 2016. The legislation clarified that FBI employees are protected when making disclosures to supervisors within the chain of command, members of Congress, and the Office of Special Counsel. In 2017, Grassley called on the FBI to update its internal policies to comply with the new law. A 2024 Government Accountability Office report found continued deficiencies in the FBI's whistleblower protection regulations.

In July 2025, Grassley introduced a second FBI Whistleblower Protection Enhancement Act (S. 2527), cosponsored by Senator Gary Peters. The bipartisan bill would extend protections from the 1989 Whistleblower Protection Act to FBI employees, prohibit supervisors from taking adverse personnel actions against whistleblowers, and eliminate the one-year waiting period before employees can challenge security clearance revocations.

On May 17, 2007, Grassley received a lifetime achievement award from the National Whistleblower Center. In April 2014, he announced plans to create a Senate caucus dedicated to strengthening whistleblower protections.

Grassley defended the whistleblower in the Trump–Ukraine scandal, breaking with his party line, saying on October 1, 2019, that the whistleblower "appears to have followed the whistleblower protection laws and ought to be heard out and protected".

After whistleblowers Colonel Alex Vindman and Ambassador Gordon Sondland testified against Trump and were subsequently fired, Grassley defended Trump's firing of both on the grounds that it was not retaliatory.

=== Donald Trump ===
Grassley supported Trump in the 2016 and 2020 presidential elections. On May 28, 2021, Grassley voted against creating an independent commission to investigate the January 6 United States Capitol attack. Later that year, Trump endorsed Grassley's 2022 reelection bid at a rally in Iowa, calling him "a great American patriot".

In July 2025, Trump publicly criticized Grassley for maintaining the Senate's blue slip tradition for federal judicial nominees, calling him "an absolute JOKE" and "totally ineffective". Grassley defended the practice, saying he was "offended" by Trump's comments and that the blue slip system provides "a necessary and time-honored check on the executive branch".

=== Joe Biden ===
After President Biden withdrew from the 2024 presidential race on July 21, 2024, Grassley posted on X, "The American ppl are sick & tired of the Biden-Harris open border policies + high cost of living crushing family budgets. A change in candidate doesn't fool anyone Changing horses midstream isn't going to stop the bad policies +reckless agenda at the top of the Democrat ticket".

== Investigations ==
=== Financial oversight ===
==== Religious organizations ====
On November 5, 2007, Grassley announced an investigation into the tax-exempt status of six ministries under the leadership of Benny Hinn, Paula White, Eddie L. Long, Joyce Meyer, Creflo Dollar, and Kenneth Copeland by the United States Senate Committee on Finance. In letters to each ministry, Grassley asked for the ministries to divulge specific financial information to the committee to determine whether or not funds collected by each organization were inappropriately utilized by ministry heads. By the December 6, 2007 deadline, only three of the ministries had shown compliance with the Finance Committee's request. On March 11, 2008, Grassley and Finance chairman Max Baucus sent follow-up letters to Kenneth Copeland, Creflo Dollar and Eddie Long, explaining that the Senate reserved the right to investigate the finances of their organizations under federal tax laws.

==== Medical research ====
Grassley also began an investigation about unreported payments to physicians by pharmaceutical companies. He led a 2008 Congressional investigation that found that well-known university psychiatrists, who had promoted psychoactive drugs, had violated federal and university regulations by secretly receiving large sums of money from the pharmaceutical companies that made the drugs. The New York Times reported that Joseph Biederman of Harvard University had failed to report over $1 million of income he had received from pharmaceutical companies. Weeks later, Grassley alleged that Alan Schatzberg, chair of psychiatry at Stanford University, had underreported his investments in Corcept Therapeutics, a company he founded. Schatzberg had reported only $100,000 investments in Corcept, but Grassley said his investments actually totaled over $6 million. Schatzberg later stepped down from his grant, which was funded by the National Institutes of Health (NIH). Similarly, Charles Nemeroff resigned as chair of the psychiatry department at Emory University after failing to report a third of the $2.8 million in consulting fees he received from GlaxoSmithKline. At the time he received the fees, Nemeroff had been principal investigator of a $3.9 million NIH grant evaluating five medications for depression GlaxoSmithKline manufactured. In 2008, for the first time, Grassley asked the American Psychiatric Association to disclose how much of its annual budget came from drug industry funds. The APA said that industry contributed 28% of its budget ($14 million at the time), mainly through paid advertising in APA journals and funds for continuing medical education.

=== Law enforcement oversight ===
==== Timothy Thibault political bias allegations ====
In May 2022, Grassley raised concerns about potential political bias by FBI Assistant Special Agent in Charge Timothy Thibault at the Washington Field Office, citing whistleblower disclosures. He alleged Thibault had made anti-Trump posts on social media and had taken actions to slow the FBI's investigation into Hunter Biden. Thibault's attorney denied the allegations regarding Hunter Biden and said his client welcomed any investigation. Thibault left the FBI in August 2022.

==== FBI Richmond Catholic memo ====
In 2023–2024, Grassley led the Senate investigation into an FBI Richmond field office memo that identified "radical traditional Catholics" as potential domestic terrorism threats. Grassley released documents he described as whistleblower disclosures showing the memo had broader distribution than the FBI initially acknowledged. The FBI retracted the memo, saying it did not meet the agency's standards.

==== Arctic Frost investigation ====
Beginning in 2025, Grassley released documents related to the Arctic Frost investigation, an FBI probe into efforts to overturn the 2020 presidential election that was transferred to Special Counsel Jack Smith in November 2022. According to documents Grassley released in 2025, the investigation was opened in April 2022 by FBI assistant special agent in charge Timothy Thibault, whom Grassley said violated FBI protocol by "self-approving" the case.

In October 2025, Grassley disclosed that the FBI had obtained phone metadata for eight Republican senators and one House member from January 4–7, 2021, and called the investigation "arguably worse than Watergate." Later that month, he released 197 subpoenas showing the investigation targeted over 430 Republican individuals and entities. Attorneys for Jack Smith wrote to Grassley defending the subpoenas as "entirely proper, lawful, and consistent with established Department of Justice policy".

==== Clinton campaign FEC violations ====
In November 2025, Grassley released FBI documents from 2019 showing the bureau had sought authorization to investigate Clinton campaign and DNC payments to Fusion GPS that the FEC later determined were misreported. According to the documents, DOJ officials declined to authorize the investigation in June 2019. In March 2022, the FEC fined the Clinton campaign $8,000 and the DNC $105,000 for misreporting over $1 million in payments to the law firm Perkins Coie, which had funded the Fusion GPS research that produced the Steele dossier.

== Personal life ==
=== Family ===
Grassley married Barbara Ann Speicher on August 22, 1954, at the Little Brown Church in Nashua, Iowa. They have five children and nine grandchildren.

His grandson Pat Grassley has been a member of the Iowa House of Representatives, since 2007. He was elected speaker of the Iowa House in 2020.

=== Memberships, awards, and History Channel feud ===
Grassley is a member of the Family, the organization that organizes the National Prayer Breakfast. He is also known for his widely reported, long-running "feud" with the History channel; he has consistently accused the network of featuring little actual history programming.

In 2003, Grassley's alma mater, the University of Northern Iowa, selected him for honoris causa membership in Omicron Delta Kappa, the National Leadership Honor Society. In 2009, the National Center for Health Research gave Grassley the Health Policy Hero award for his 2004 oversight of legislative reforms and accountability of the United States Food and Drug Administration (FDA). In 2010, The Hill named Grassley and Max Baucus the hardest-working members of Congress.

=== Health ===
In December 1973, Grassley fell while running, causing a painful bone cyst to grow on his knee. He went to University of Iowa Hospital in May 1974 and had surgery to remove it. During the surgery, doctors found a benign tumor in his shin, which was also removed. He was released after almost two weeks in the hospital.

In May 1980, Grassley was involved in a car crash in Cedar Rapids, in a car driven by an aide, resulting in Grassley's bruising his knees.

On June 22, 1985, Grassley and his wife, Barbara, were involved in a plane crash in Fort Madison after leaving a campaign fundraiser for the Lee County Republicans. The plane, piloted by Irv Linder, took off from Fort Madison Municipal Airport and had to land in an oatfield just beyond the airport due to an faulty fuel pump. No injuries were reported. Grassley then drove to Keokuk.

In November 2020, Grassley tested positive for COVID-19 and began a quarantine. He returned to work on November 30.

In 2023, Grassley fell at his DC town home. On January 11, he underwent surgery to fix a hip fracture. On February 1, he returned to the Senate, using a wheelchair.

On January 16, 2024, Grassley was hospitalized for an infection. He was released on January 18.

On April 20, 2026, it was announced that Grassley had had surgery to remove gallstones the previous weekend in Iowa and had recovered quickly.

=== Farm ===
In 1910, Louis Grassley worked as a farmhand for the Heitland family farm in Hardin County. He then rented land for a few years before buying an 80-acre farm in Butler County in 1926. During the Great Depression, he had the option to buy an additional 80 acres for $2,000, but decided against it as he was struggling to make ends meet. Louis died in 1960 and Chuck started renting the land.

In 1965, Grassley purchased 120 acres for about $36,000 to expand his farming operations. When his mother, Ruth, died in 1974, he purchased her 80, making it 200 acres. He grew soybeans, oats, and alfalfa, and raised sheep, cattle, and hogs.

His son, Robin, began operating the farm at age 19, around 1980. By 2000, Grassley owned 750 acres that he worked with his son, and his son had another 700 acres that he farmed.

In 2018, Grassley had to defend why he was applying for a farm bailout, where he could receive anywhere from a few hundred dollars to $35,000. Grassley farms corn and soybeans with his son Robin and grandson Pat.

According to OpenSecrets, Grassley's net worth was more than $7.5 million as of 2018.

=== Social media ===
Grassley has achieved significant public attention for his idiosyncratic communication style on platforms like X. His posts frequently include blunt updates on his life and nonstandard punctuation and grammar.

He is known for often posting about his enjoyment of Dairy Queen ice cream.

A prominent feature of his social media posts was "Beth", a vintage 1970s Hoover Concept Two vacuum cleaner that originally belonged to his mother-in-law. Grassley frequently shared photos of himself operating the appliance on major holidays, turning the vacuum into an internet meme. On August 8, 2026, Grassley announced Beth's "passing" at the age of 49 due to an unrepairable electrical failure, drawing widespread media coverage.

== Electoral history ==
=== Summary ===
Grassley ran unopposed in his Republican primary elections from 1958 to 1970 and from 1976 to 1978. He won all his Senate elections with at least 60% of the vote except in 1980 and 2022. The only general election in which he ran unopposed was in 1968, for Iowa House. Over 70 years, Grassley lost only one race out of 20, the 1956 Iowa House election.

=== 2020s ===
==== 2028 ====
On November 16, 2022, Grassley filed for reelection for a ninth term in 2028. He would be 95 at the time of the election and 101 at the end of the term.

==== 2022 ====
In May 2021, Grassley said he would not decide whether to run for reelection in 2022 until between eight and 12 months before the election. Many believed that an open seat in Iowa would benefit the Democrats as they could convince many Grassley supporters to vote for their nominee. In July 2021, former U.S. representative Abby Finkenauer announced that she would run for the seat regardless of Grassley's decision and criticized him and Republican Senate leader Mitch McConnell for being "obsessed with power" and not taking a strong stance against those who breached the Capitol in the January 6 United States Capitol attack.

In September 2021, Grassley announced his candidacy for an eighth term. His announcement was viewed as advantageous to Republicans seeking to hold Grassley's seat and retake the Senate majority in 2022. He won the general election, defeating Democratic nominee Michael Franken on November 8, 2022. It was his weakest Senate re-election since his initial 1980 victory.

2022 United States Senate election in Iowa, Republican Primary
Party	Candidate	Votes	%	±%
Republican	Chuck Grassley	139,451	73.4%	+7.86%
Republican	Jim Carlin	50,166	26.4%	
	Write in	307	0.2%	
Turnout		190,014	100%	

2022 United States Senate election in Iowa
Party	Candidate	Votes	%	±%
Republican	Chuck Grassley (inc.)	681,507	56.0%	−4.09%
Democratic	Michael Franken	533,717	43.9%	+8.24%
Republican hold				

=== 2010s ===
==== 2016 ====
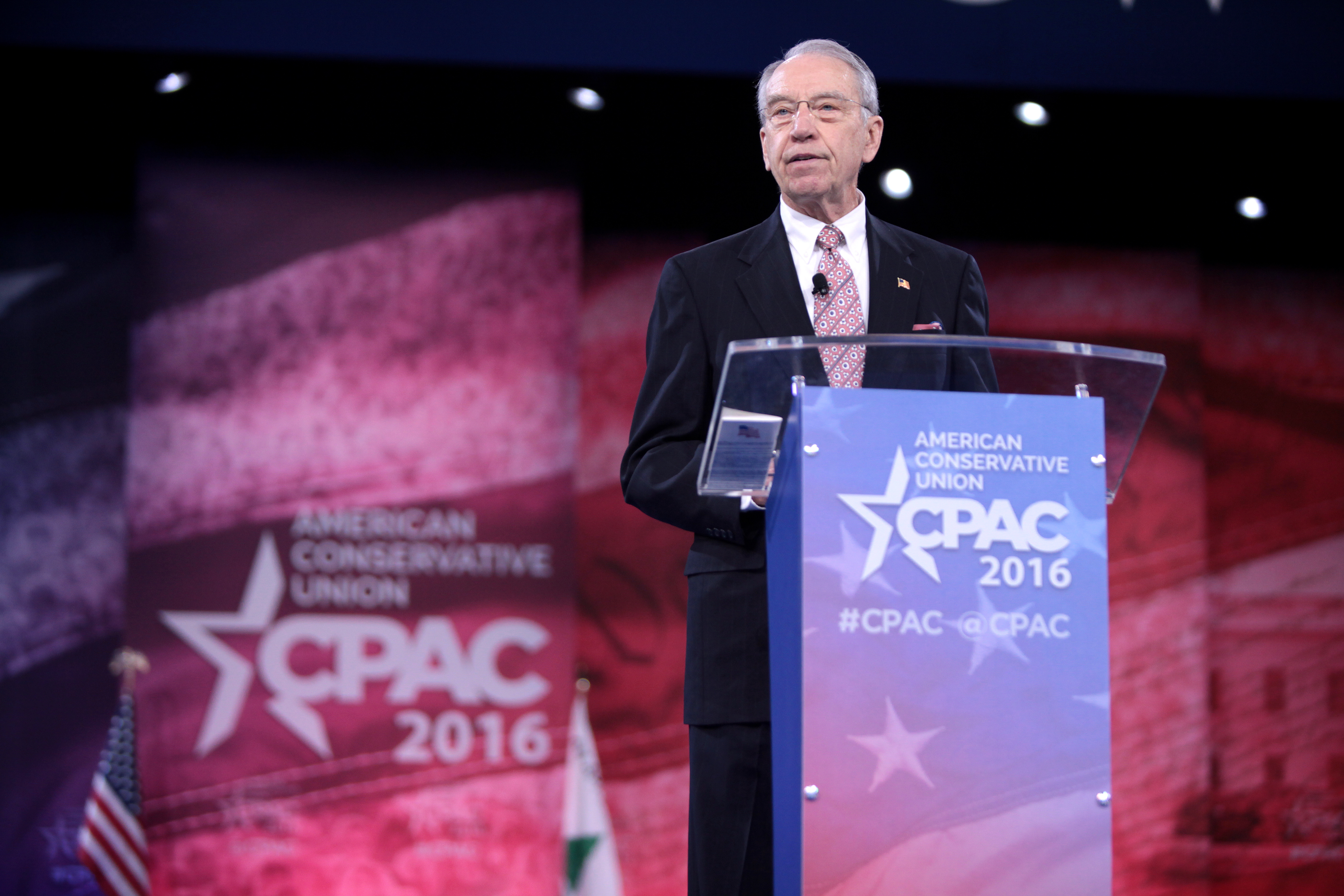
Grassley speaking at the 2016 Conservative Political Action Conference (CPAC) in Washington, D.C.

Grassley sought a seventh term in the 2016 election. He was expected to face a strong challenge from former Democratic lieutenant governor Patty Judge, but won his seventh term with over 60% of the vote as Republican presidential nominee Donald Trump won Iowa with over 51% of the vote.

2016 United States Senate election in Iowa
Party	Candidate	Votes	%	±%
Republican	Chuck Grassley (inc.)	926,007	60.09%	−4.26%
Democratic	Patty Judge	549,460	35.66%	+2.36%
Libertarian	Charles Aldrich	41,794	2.71%	+0.44%
Independent	Jim Hennager	17,649	1.15%	N/A
Independent	Michael Luick-Thrams	4,441	0.29%	N/A
Write-ins		1,686	0.11%	+0.03%
Majority		376,547	24.43%	−6.62%
Turnout		1,541,037		
Republican hold		Swing		

==== 2010 ====
Grassley sought a sixth term in the 2010 election. He was challenged by Democrat Roxanne Conlin and Libertarian John Heiderscheit.

Grassley was unopposed in the Republican primary, although conservative Iowans such as Bill Salier and Craig Robinson said he had drifted "too far to the left".

Grassley was reelected with 718,215 votes to Conlin's 371,686. He won 98 counties, losing Johnson County. Heiderscheit received 25,290 votes.

2010 United States Senate election in Iowa
Party	Candidate	Votes	%	±%
Republican	Chuck Grassley (inc.)	718,215	64.35%	−5.83%
Democratic	Roxanne Conlin	371,686	33.30%	+5.43%
Libertarian	John Heiderscheit	25,290	2.27%	+1.24%
Write-ins		872	0.08%	+0.05%
Majority		346,529	31.05%	−11.26%
Turnout		1,116,063		
Republican hold		Swing		

=== 2000s ===
Grassley was reelected in 2004, defeating former state senator Arthur A. Small.

2004 United States Senate election in Iowa
Party	Candidate	Votes	%	±%
Republican	Chuck Grassley (inc.)	1,038,175	70.18%	+1.77%
Democratic	Art Small	412,365	27.88%	−2.62%
Libertarian	Christy Ann Welty	15,218	1.03%	N/A
Green	Daryl A. Northrop	11,121	0.75%	N/A
Socialist Workers	Edwin Fruit	1,874	0.13%	−0.14%
Write-ins		475	0.03%	0%
Majority		625,810	42.31%	+4.39%
Turnout		1,479,228		
Republican hold		Swing		

=== 1990s ===
==== 1998 ====
Grassley was reelected in 1998, defeating former state representative David Osterberg, who won the Democratic nomination unopposed. He won all 99 counties.

1998 United States Senate election in Iowa
Party	Candidate	Votes	%	±%
Republican	Chuck Grassley (inc.)	648,480	68.41%	−1.20%
Democratic	David Osterberg	289,049	30.49%	+3.29%
Natural Law	Susan Marcus	7,561	0.80%	−0.47%
Socialist Workers	Margaret Trowe	2,542	0.27%	+0.16%
Write-ins		275	0.03%	+0.01%
Majority		359,431	37.92%	−4.50%
Turnout		947,907		
Republican hold		Swing		

==== 1992 ====
Grassley was reelected in 1992, defeating Democratic state senator Jean Hall Lloyd-Jones. He won all 99 counties.

1992 United States Senate election in Iowa
Party	Candidate	Votes	%	±%
Republican	Chuck Grassley (inc.)	899,761	69.61%	+3.58%
Democratic	Jean Hall Lloyd-Jones	351,561	27.20%	−6.37%
Natural Law	Stuart Zimmerman	16,403	1.27%	N/A
Independent	Sue Atkinson	6,277	0.49%	N/A
Independent	Mel Boring	5,508	0.43%	N/A
Independent	Rosanne Freeburg	4,999	0.39%	N/A
Grassroots	Carl Eric Olsen	3,404	0.26%	N/A
Independent	Richard O'Dell Hughes	2,918	0.23%	N/A
Socialist Workers	Cleve Andrew Pulley	1,370	0.11%	N/A
Write-ins		293	0.02%	+0.01%
Majority		548,200	42.41%	+9.95%
Turnout		1,292,494		
Republican hold		Swing		

=== 1980s ===
==== 1986 ====
Grassley was reelected in 1986, defeating the Democratic nominee, attorney John P. Roehrick. He won 98 counties, losing Wapello County.

1986 United States Senate election in Iowa
Party	Candidate	Votes	%	±%
Republican	Chuck Grassley (inc.)	588,880	66.04%	+12.55%
Democratic	John P. Roehrick	299,406	33.57%	−11.97%
Independent	John Masters	3,370	0.38%	N/A
Write-ins		106	0.01%	+0.01%
Majority		289,474	32.46%	+24.51%
Turnout		891,762		
Republican hold		Swing		

==== 1980 ====
Grassley was first elected to the Senate in 1980, defeating Democratic incumbent John Culver.

1980 United States Senate election in Iowa, Republican Primary
Party	Candidate	Votes	%	±%
Republican	Chuck Grassley	170,120	65.54%	
Republican	Tom Stoner	89,409	34.45%	
Turnout		259,529	100%	

1980 United States Senate election in Iowa
Party	Candidate	Votes	%	±%
Republican	Chuck Grassley	683,014	53.49%	+4.21%
Democratic	John Culver (inc.)	581,545	45.54%	−4.48%
Independent	Garry De Young	5,858	0.46%	N/A
Libertarian	Robert V. Hengerer	4,233	0.33%	N/A
Independent	John Ingram Henderson	2,336	0.18%	N/A
Write-ins		48	0.00%	+0%
Majority		101,469	7.95%	+7.20%
Turnout		1,772,983		
Republican gain from Democratic		Swing		

=== 1970s ===
==== 1978 ====
1978 US House general election for Iowa's 3rd district
Party	Candidate	Votes	%	±%
Republican	Chuck Grassley (inc.)	103,659	74.80%	
Democratic	John Knudson	34,880	25.17%	
	Scattering	39	0.03%	
Turnout		138,578	100%	
Republican hold				

==== 1976 ====
1976 US House general election for Iowa's 3rd district
Party	Candidate	Votes	%	±%
Republican	Chuck Grassley (inc.)	117,957	56.46%	
Democratic	Stephen Rapp	90,981	43.54%	
	Scattering	5	0.002%	
Turnout		208,943	100%	
Republican hold				

==== 1974 ====
1974 US House primary election for Iowa's 3rd district
Party	Candidate	Votes	%	±%
Republican	Chuck Grassley	13,495	42.02%	
Republican	Robert E. Case	9,044	28.16%	
Republican	Charlene Conklin	6,043	18.81%	
Republican	Bart Schwieger	2,123	6.61%	
Republican	John Williams	1,412	4.40%	
Turnout		32,117	100%	

1974 US House general election for Iowa's 3rd district
Party	Candidate	Votes	%	±%
Republican	Chuck Grassley	77,468	50.85%	
Democratic	Stephen Rapp	74,895	49.15%	
Turnout		152,363	100%	
Republican hold				

==== 1972 ====
1972 Iowa House, District 37 primary election
Party	Candidate	Votes	%	±%
Republican	Chuck Grassley	2,537	76.48%	
Republican	Luvern W. Kehe	780	23.52%	
Turnout		3,317	100%	

1972 Iowa House, District 37 general election
Party	Candidate	Votes	%	±%
Republican	Chuck Grassley	7,846	70.77%	
Democratic	Tim Youngblood	3,241	29.23%	
Turnout		11,087	100%	
Republican hold				

==== 1970 ====
1970 Iowa House, District 10 general election
Party	Candidate	Votes	%	±%
Republican	Chuck Grassley	3,672	62.65%	
Democratic	Robin K. Howell	2,123	36.22%	
Independent	Celene Eliason	66	1.13%	
Turnout		5,861	100%	
Republican hold				

=== 1960s ===
==== 1968 ====
1968 Iowa House, District 73 general election
Party	Candidate	Votes	%	±%
Republican	Chuck Grassley	4,865	100%	
Turnout		4,865	100%	
Republican hold				

==== 1966 ====
1966 Iowa House, District 73 general election
Party	Candidate	Votes	%	±%
Republican	Chuck Grassley	3,445	69.23%	
Democratic	Floyd J. Ramker	1,531	30.77%	
Turnout		4,976	100%	
Republican hold				

==== 1964 ====
1964 Iowa House, District 73 general election
Party	Candidate	Votes	%	±%
Republican	Chuck Grassley	3,884	60.85%	
Democratic	Beverly Moffitt	2,498	39.15%	
Turnout		6,382	100%	
Republican hold				

==== 1962 ====
1962 Iowa House, District 73 general election
Party	Candidate	Votes	%	±%
Republican	Chuck Grassley	3,017	64.35%	
Democratic	Vernon Garner	1,672	35.65%	
Turnout		4,689	100%	
Republican hold				

==== 1960 ====
1960 Iowa House, District 73 general election
Party	Candidate	Votes	%	±%
Republican	Chuck Grassley	3,021	64.12%	
Democratic	Travis C. Moffitt	1,690	35.87%	
Turnout		4,711	100%	
Republican hold				

=== 1950s ===
==== 1958 ====
1958 Iowa House, District 73 general election
Party	Candidate	Votes	%	±%
Republican	Chuck Grassley	5,001	69.05%	
Democratic	Vernon Garner	2,241	30.94%	
Turnout		7,242	100%	
Republican hold				

==== 1956 ====
1956 Iowa House, District 73 primary election
Party	Candidate	Votes	%	±%
Republican	Chuck Grassley	1,042	48.2%	
Republican	Wayne W. Ballhagen	1,122	51.8%	
Turnout		2,164	100%	

== Notes ==
U.S. House of Representatives
Preceded by H. R. Gross	Member of the U.S. House of Representatives from Iowa's 3rd congressional district 1975–1981	Succeeded by T. Cooper Evans
Party political offices
Preceded by David M. Stanley	Republican nominee for U.S. senator from Iowa (Class 3); 1980, 1986, 1992, 1998, 2004, 2010, 2016, 2022	Most recent
U.S. Senate
Preceded by John Culver	U.S. Senator (Class 3) from Iowa; 1981–present Served alongside: Roger Jepsen, Tom Harkin, Joni Ernst, Josh Turek (elect)	Incumbent
Preceded by William Cohen	Chair of the Senate Aging Committee; 1997–2001	Succeeded by Larry Craig
Preceded by Daniel Patrick Moynihan	Ranking Member of the Senate Finance Committee; 2001	Succeeded by Max Baucus
Preceded by Max Baucus	Chair of the Senate Finance Committee; 2001	Succeeded by Max Baucus
Preceded by Max Baucus	Ranking Member of the Senate Finance Committee; 2001–2003	Succeeded by Max Baucus
Preceded by Max Baucus	Chair of the Senate Finance Committee; 2003–2007	Succeeded by Max Baucus
Preceded by Joe Biden	Chair of the Senate Narcotics Caucus; 2003–2007	Succeeded by Joe Biden
Preceded by Bill Thomas	Chair of the Joint Taxation Committee; 2004–2005	Succeeded by Bill Thomas
Preceded by Bill Thomas	Chair of the Joint Taxation Committee; 2006–2007	Succeeded by Charlie Rangel
Preceded by Joe Biden	Ranking Member of the Senate Narcotics Caucus; 2007–2015	Succeeded by Dianne Feinstein
Preceded by Max Baucus	Ranking Member of the Senate Finance Committee; 2007–2011	Succeeded by Orrin Hatch
Preceded by Jeff Sessions	Ranking Member of the Senate Judiciary Committee; 2011–2015	Succeeded by Patrick Leahy
Preceded by Patrick Leahy	Chair of the Senate Judiciary Committee; 2015–2019	Succeeded by Lindsey Graham
Preceded by Dianne Feinstein	Chair of the Senate Narcotics Caucus; 2015–2019	Succeeded by John Cornyn
Preceded by Orrin Hatch	Chair of the Senate Finance Committee; 2019–2021	Succeeded by Ron Wyden
Preceded by Richard Neal	Chair of the Joint Taxation Committee; 2020–2021	Succeeded by Richard Neal
Preceded by Dianne Feinstein	Ranking Member of the Senate Judiciary Committee; 2021–2023	Succeeded by Lindsey Graham
Preceded by Lindsey Graham	Ranking Member of the Senate Budget Committee; 2023–2025	Succeeded by Jeff Merkley
Preceded by John Cornyn	Ranking Member of the Senate Narcotics Caucus; 2023–2025	Succeeded by Sheldon Whitehouse
Preceded by Dick Durbin	Chair of the Senate Judiciary Committee; 2025–present	Incumbent
Political offices
Preceded by Orrin Hatch	President pro tempore of the United States Senate; 2019–2021	Succeeded by Patrick Leahy
Preceded by Patty Murray	President pro tempore of the United States Senate; 2025–present	Incumbent
Honorary titles
Preceded by Orrin Hatch	Most senior Republican in the United States Senate; 2019–present	Incumbent
Preceded by Patrick Leahy	Dean of the U.S. Senate; 2023–present	Incumbent
Preceded by Dianne Feinstein	Oldest United States Senator; 2023–present	Incumbent
Order of precedence
Preceded by John Ratcliffe as Director of the Central Intelligence Agency	Order of precedence of the United States as President pro tempore of the U.S. Senate	Succeeded by John Thune as U.S. Senate Majority Leader
First	United States senators by seniority 1st	Succeeded by Mitch McConnell
U.S. presidential line of succession
Preceded by Mike Johnson as Speaker of the U.S. House of Representatives	Third in line as President pro tempore of the U.S. Senate	Succeeded by Marco Rubio as Secretary of State
