= Jerome D. Fitzgerald =

American politician (born 1941)

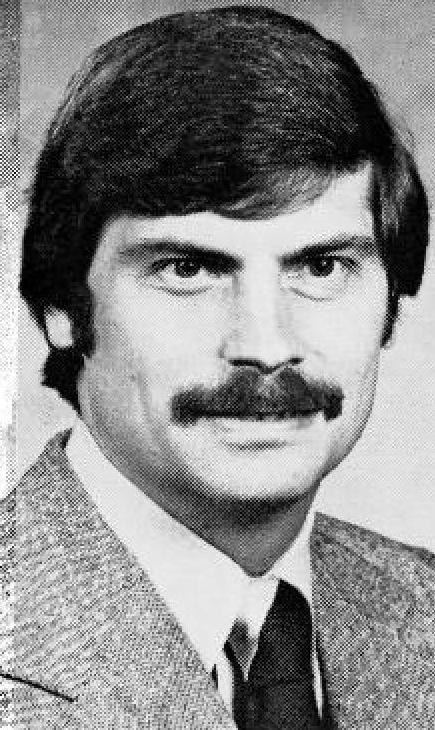

Member of the Iowa House of Representatives
- In office January 8, 1973 – January 7, 1979

Personal details
- Born: April 22, 1941 (age 85) Webster County, Iowa, U.S.
- Party: Democratic
- Occupation: political consultant

Jerome D. Fitzgerald (born April 22, 1941) is an American politician from the state of Iowa.

Fitzgerald was born in Webster County, Iowa and attended Iowa State University. He served in the Iowa House of Representatives from 1973 to 1979, as a Democrat. He also made an unsuccessful run for governor in 1978, losing to incumbent Robert D. Ray.

Party political offices
Preceded by James Schaben	Democratic nominee for Governor of Iowa; 1978	Succeeded by Roxanne Conlin
