= 1980 United States Senate election in Iowa =

- November 4, 1980

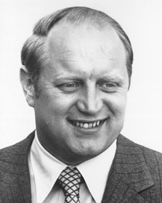
Nominee	Chuck Grassley	John Culver
Party	Republican	Democratic
Popular vote	683,014	581,545
Percentage	53.49%	45.54%
- County results Grassley: 50–60% 60–70% 70–80% Culver: 50–60% 60–70%
U.S. senator before election
John Culver
Democratic
Elected U.S. Senator
Chuck Grassley
Republican

The 1980 United States Senate election in Iowa was held on November 4, 1980. Incumbent Democratic United States Senator John Culver ran for reelection to a second term, but lost to Republican nominee Chuck Grassley, the United States Congressman from Iowa's 3rd congressional district. This election marked the beginning of eight consecutive victories for Grassley in the Senate. It remains the closest election of his Senate career.

== Democratic primary ==
=== Candidates ===
- John Culver, incumbent United States Senator

=== Results ===
Democratic primary results
Party	Candidate	Votes	%
Democratic	John Culver (incumbent)	95,656	99.95%
Democratic	Write-ins	52	0.05%
Total votes		95,708	100.00%

== Republican primary ==
=== Candidates ===
- Chuck Grassley, United States Congressman from Iowa's 3rd congressional district
- Tom Stoner, broadcast executive and former Chairman of the Iowa Republican Party

=== Results ===
Republican primary results
Party	Candidate	Votes	%
Republican	Chuck Grassley	170,120	65.54%
Republican	Tom Stoner	89,409	34.45%
Republican	Write-ins	34	0.01%
Total votes		259,563	100.00%

== General election ==
=== Results ===
United States Senate election in Iowa, 1980
Party	Candidate	Votes	%	±%
Republican	Chuck Grassley	683,014	53.49%	▲6.21
Democratic	John Culver (incumbent)	581,545	45.54%	▼6.50
Independent	Garry De Young	5,858	0.46%	N/A
Libertarian	Robert V. Hengerer	4,233	0.33%	N/A
Independent	John Ingram Henderson	2,336	0.18%	N/A
Majority		101,469	7.95%	+3.19%
Turnout		1,772,983		
Republican gain from Democratic		Swing		

== See also ==
- 1980 United States Senate elections
