= Bob Krause (politician) =

American politician

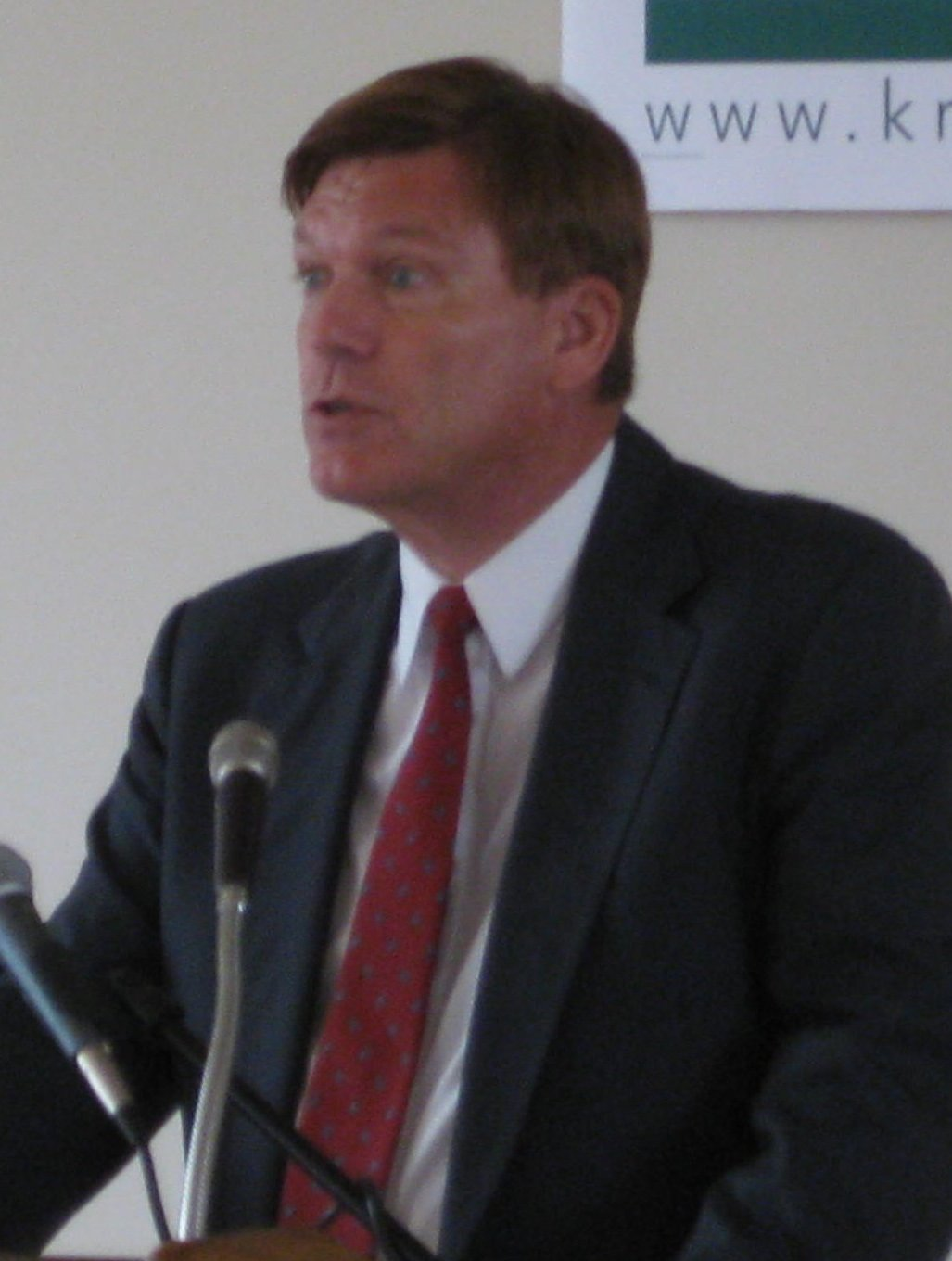
- Krause in 2009

Member of the Iowa House of Representatives from the 7th district
- In office 1973–1978
- Preceded by: Kenneth L. Logemann
- Succeeded by: Sue Mullins

Personal details
- Born: January 15, 1950 (age 76) Algona, Iowa, U.S.
- Party: Democratic
- Spouse: Vicky Krause
- Education: University of Iowa

Robert A. Krause (born January 15, 1950) is an American politician and perennial candidate. He served in the Iowa General Assembly from 1973 until 1979. He has also served as Regional Representative for the US Secretary of Transportation during the Carter Administration, and on the Waterloo, Iowa school board.

== Early life and education ==
Krause was raised on a family farm in rural northwest Iowa, Krause graduated in 1968 from Sentral Community School District of Fenton, Iowa. He was active in 4-H, church, athletics and editor of the student newspaper.

Krause attended the University of Iowa financing his education with a combination of work, scholarships and loans. He graduated in 1972 with a B.A. degree in political science. He was a member of ROTC and was commissioned as a 2nd Lieutenant in the Army Reserve in the summer of 1972. Krause also served in the student senate and was president of University Democrats. He also worked two summers for the Robert D. Fulton for Governor campaign the Iowa Democratic Party.

== Politics ==
Krause ran for state representative to the Iowa General Assembly and served six years in the Iowa House of Representatives. Krause's was appointed as Assistant House Minority Whip in his first term. In this capacity, he helped pass Iowa's collective bargaining for public employees law.

As Chair of the House Transportation Committee for four years, he was assisted in the passage of legislation that allowed for the establishment of the coordinated regional transit systems throughout Iowa, which became a national model of the Federal Transit Administration. He also crafted a restructuring of Iowa's road system that included Iowa's first ethanol exemption when passed, which became the basis for Iowa's ethanol industry. Because of these efforts and others, The Des Moines Register in 1978 honored him as one of the "Top 10 Most Effective Iowa Legislators."

Krause left the House that year to run for Treasurer of the State of Iowa. Although he lost, he ran 5 points ahead of the top of the ticket. After a brief stint for Land O'Lakes as transportation manager for the Agricultural Services Group, Krause left to become Regional Representative for the Secretary of Transportation in 1979. In this capacity, he was ranking department official for Kansas, Iowa, Missouri and Nebraska, and he was administration spokesperson in the field for federal policy.

== Post political career ==
Following his service in the Carter administration, Krause taught in the business school at Iowa State University then joined the staff of the Council of State Governments, the national association for state government officials. There he ran a think-tank on transportation policy, writing five books and staffing several national policy task forces on transportation matters. He left that position for an intergovernmental affairs position with Palm Beach County, Florida, but subsequently returned to Iowa for family reasons.

Upon his return Krause then served as transit director for the Iowa Northland Council of Governments before joining the Iowa Department of Transportation in 1986. He served as a district planner then served as planning and coordination manager for the Public Transit Division. He also managed Iowa's Rural and Large Urban Public Transit Intelligent Transportation System. He retired in 2008 from the Iowa DOT with 20 years of state government service, and served briefly as an advisor to the government of Dubai, United Arab Emirates, on transportation policy matters. From there he returned to Iowa to take a position with VSE Corporation, a small defense contractor. In that role, focused on the readiness of weapons and equipment for a five state Army Reserve command. He left that position in early 2015.

== 2010 U.S. Senate campaign ==
Krause was a candidate for United States Senate from Iowa in the 2010 United States Senate election in Iowa. He lost the Democratic party primary to Roxanne Conlin who later lost in the Senate election against Charles Grassley. On Veterans Day, November 11, 2014, Krause again announced his intention to form an exploratory committee for a possible run against incumbent Senator from Iowa Charles Grassley.

== 2022 U.S. Senate campaign ==
In October 2021, Krause announced that he would be seeking the Democratic Party nomination for the 2022 United States Senate race.

== 2026 U.S. Senate campaign ==
On September 5, 2025, Krause announced his candidacy for the Democratic nomination in the 2026 United States Senate election in Iowa.

== Awards ==
Krause was recognized for his public service by having a locomotive named "Robert A. Krause" by the Rock Island Railroad in honor of his work on transportation issues. He was honored by the Secretary of Transportation for his efforts to pass railroad deregulation.

Party political offices
Preceded by Daniel B. Fitzgerald	Democratic nominee for Treasurer of Iowa; 1978	Succeeded by Michael Fitzgerald
