= 2002 Iowa Senate election =

- November 5, 2002

35 out of 50 seats in the Iowa State Senate 26 seats needed for a majority
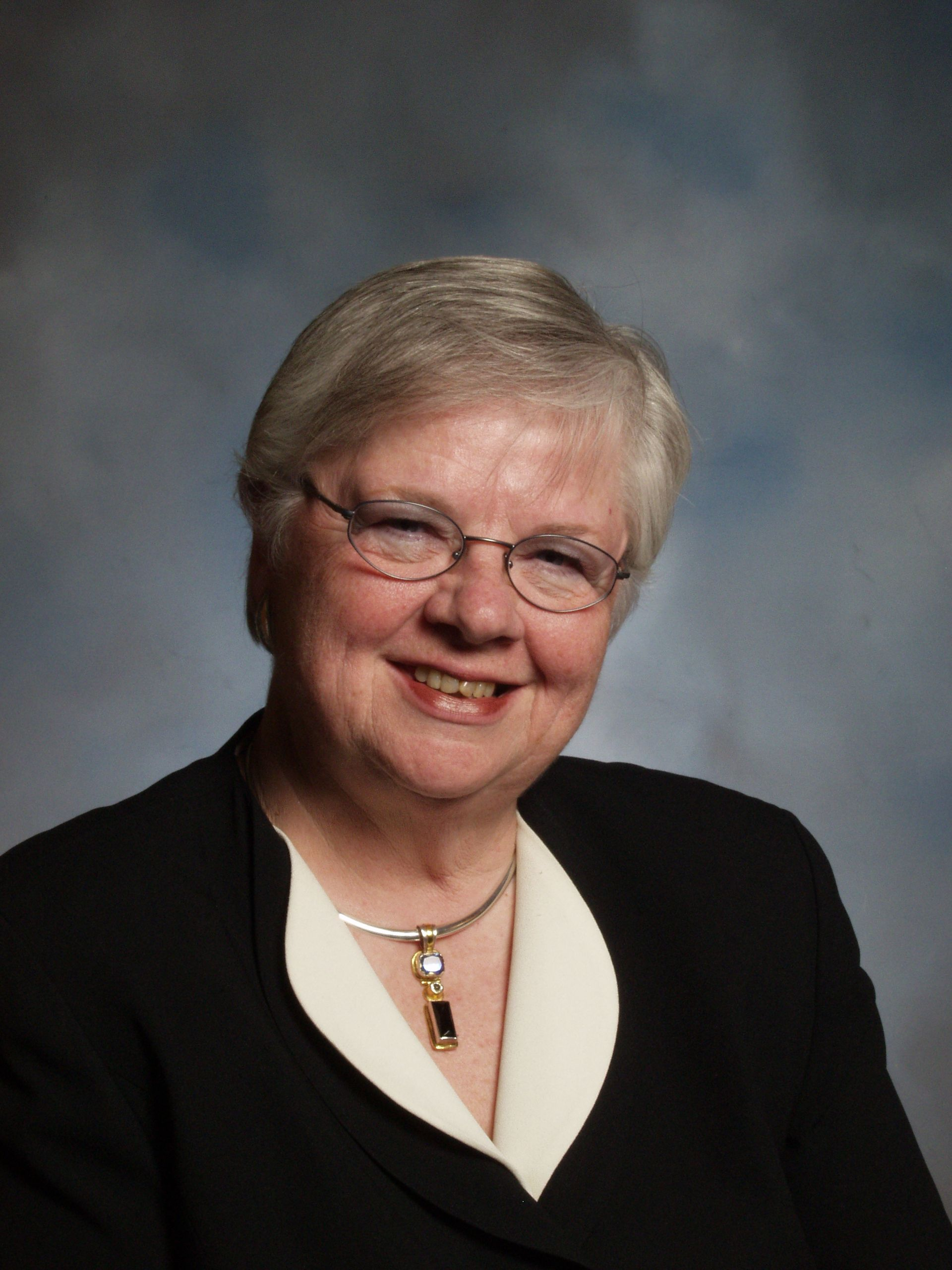

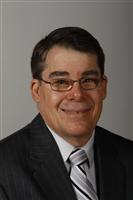
	Majority party	Minority party
Leader	Mary Kramer	Michael Gronstal
Party	Republican	Democratic
Leader's seat	30th	50th
Last election	30	20
Seats before	29 (Note: Democrat Amanda Ragan won a special election in March 2002 to fill a vacancy in District 10 that had been held by Republican Merlin Bartz.)	21
Seats after	29	21
Seat change	Steady	Steady
President of the Senate before election
Mary Kramer
Republican
Elected President of the Senate
Mary Kramer
Republican

The 2002 Iowa State Senate elections took place as part of the biennial 2002 United States elections. Iowa voters elected state senators in 35 of the state senate's 50 districts—all 25 of the odd-numbered seats were up for regularly scheduled elections and, due to the oddities of redistricting following the 2000 Census, 10 of the even-numbered sears were up as well. State senators serve four-year terms in the Iowa State Senate, with half of the seats traditionally up for election each cycle.

The primary election on June 4, 2002, determined which candidates appeared on the November 5, 2002 general election ballot. Primary election results can be obtained here. General election results can be obtained here.

Following the previous 2000 Iowa Senate election, Republicans had control of the Iowa state Senate with 30 seats to Democrats' 20 seats. On March 12, 2002, a special election in district 10 resulted in Amanda Ragan flipping a seat in favor of the Democrats. Therefore, on election day in November 2002, Republicans controlled 29 seats and Democrats had 21. To reclaim control of the chamber from Republicans, the Democrats needed to net 5 Senate seats. Republicans maintained control of the Iowa State Senate following the 2002 general election with the balance of power remaining unchanged with Republicans holding 29 seats and Democrats having 21 seats.

== Predictions ==
Source	Ranking	As of
The Cook; Political Report	Lean R	October 4, 2002

== Summary of Results ==
- NOTE: 15 of the even-numbered districts did not have elections in 2002 so they are not listed here.
- Also note, an asterisk (*) after a Senator's name indicates they were an incumbent re-elected, but to a new district number due to redistricting.

State Senate District	Incumbent	Party	Elected Senator	Party
1st	Steven D. Hansen	Dem	Steve Warnstadt	Democratic
2nd	John Redwine	Rep	Kenneth Veenstra* (Note: Redistricted from district 3 to 2.)	Republican
3rd	Kenneth Veenstra	Rep	David Johnson	Republican
5th	Mary Lou Freeman	Rep	Stewart Iverson* (Note: Redistricted from district 9 to 5.)	Republican
7th	Michael Sexton	Rep	Amanda Ragan* (Note: Redistricted from district 10 to 7.)	Democratic
8th	E. Thurman Gaskill	Rep	Mark Zieman* (Note: Redistricted from district 16 to 8.)	Republican
9th	Stewart Iverson	Rep	Bob Brunkhorst	Republican
11th	John W. Jensen	Rep	William Dotzler	Democratic
13th	Patricia M. Harper	Dem	Roger Stewart	Democratic
15th	Betty A. Soukup	Dem	Robert Dvorsky* (Note: Redistricted from district 25 to 15.)	Democratic
16th	Mark Zieman	Rep	Julie Hosch	Republican
17th	Thomas L. Flynn	Dem	Wally Horn* (Note: Redistricted from district 27 to 17.)	Democratic
19th	Sheldon L. Rittmer	Rep	Chuck Larson	Republican
20th	Tom Fiegen	Dem	John Putney	Republican
21st	Maggie Tinsman	Rep	Dennis Black* (Note: Redistricted from district 29 to 21.)	Democratic
23rd	Joe Bolkcom	Dem	Herman Quirmbach	Democratic
25th	Robert Dvorsky	Dem	Daryl Beall	Democratic
27th	Wally Horn	Dem	Ron Wieck	Republican
28th	Andy McKean	Rep	James Seymour	Republican
29th	Dennis Black	Dem	Nancy Boettger* (Note: Redistricted from district 41 to 29.)	Republican
30th	Neal Schuerer	Rep	Mary Kramer* (Note: Redistricted from district 37 to 30.)	Republican
31st	Johnie Hammond	Dem	Matt McCoy* (Note: Redistricted from district 34 to 31.)	Democratic
33rd	Jeff Lamberti	Rep	Jack Hatch	Democratic
34th	Matt McCoy	Dem	Dick Dearden* (Note: Redistricted from district 35 to 34.)	Democratic
35th	Dick Dearden	Dem	Jeff Lamberti* (Note: Redistricted from district 33 to 35.)	Republican
37th	Mary Kramer	Rep	Doug Shull	Republican
39th	David G. Lord	Rep	Joe Bolkcom* (Note: Redistricted from district 23 to 39.)	Democratic
40th	Jerry Behn	Rep	Richard F. Drake* (Note: Redistricted from district 24 to 40.)	Republican
41st	Nancy Boettger	Rep	Maggie Tinsman* (Note: Redistricted from district 21 to 41.)	Republican
42nd	Michael Gronstal	Dem	Bryan Sievers	Republican
43rd	Hubert Houser	Rep	Joe M. Seng	Democratic
44th	Jeff Angelo	Rep	Thomas G. Courtney	Democratic
45th	Bill Fink	Dem	David Miller* (Note: Redistricted from district 47 to 45.)	Republican
47th	David Miller	Rep	Keith A. Kreiman	Democratic
49th	Mark Shearer	Dem	Hubert Houser* (Note: Redistricted from district 43 to 49.)	Republican

== Detailed Results ==
- Reminder: All odd-numbered Iowa Senate seats were up for election in 2002 as well as 10 of the even-numbered seats due to redistricting following the 2000 Census. 15 of the even-numbered seats are not included here because they did not have elections in 2002.
- Note: If a district does not list a primary, then that district did not have a competitive primary (i.e., there may have only been one candidate file for that district).

=== District 1 ===
Iowa Senate, District 1 General Election, 2002
Party	Candidate	Votes	%
Democratic	Steve Warnstadt	8,871	63.9
Republican	Jack Voss	5,020	36.1
Total votes		13,891	100.0
Democratic hold			

=== District 2 ===
Iowa Senate, District 2 Republican Primary Election, 2002
Party	Candidate	Votes	%
Republican	Kenneth Veenstra (incumbent)	5,295	56.0
Republican	George K. Schneidermann	4,167	44.0
Total votes		9,462	100.0

Iowa Senate, District 2 General Election, 2002
Party	Candidate	Votes	%
Republican	Kenneth Veenstra (incumbent)	16,178	100.0
Total votes		16,178	100.0
Republican hold			

=== District 3 ===
Iowa Senate, District 3 General Election, 2002
Party	Candidate	Votes	%
Republican	David Johnson	12,161	60.8
Democratic	John D. Ryan	7,855	39.2
Total votes		20,016	100.0
Republican hold			

=== District 5 ===
Iowa Senate, District 5 Democratic Primary Election, 2002
Party	Candidate	Votes	%
Democratic	Kevin J. Miskell	767	67.6
Democratic	Darrell Determann	368	32.4
Total votes		1,135	100.0

Iowa Senate, District 5 General Election, 2002
Party	Candidate	Votes	%
Republican	Stewart Iverson (incumbent)	12,106	57.5
Democratic	Kevin J. Miskell	8,959	42.5
Total votes		21,065	100.0
Republican hold			

=== District 7 ===
Iowa Senate, District 7 Republican Primary Election, 2002
Party	Candidate	Votes	%
Republican	Mary Ellen Miller	2,050	56.5
Republican	Art Wolover	1,577	43.5
Total votes		3,627	100.0

Iowa Senate, District 7 General Election, 2002
Party	Candidate	Votes	%
Democratic	Amanda Ragan (incumbent)	11,719	60.6
Republican	Mary Ellen Miller	6,861	35.4
Independent	Kevin Smith	765	4.0
Total votes		19,345	100.0
Democratic gain from Republican			

=== District 8 ===
Iowa Senate, District 8 General Election, 2002
Party	Candidate	Votes	%
Republican	Mark Zieman (incumbent)	11,529	56.7
Democratic	Lyle Otte	8,817	43.3
Total votes		20,346	100.0
Republican hold			

=== District 9 ===
Iowa Senate, District 9 Republican Primary Election, 2002
Party	Candidate	Votes	%
Republican	Bob Brunkhorst	2,431	50.1
Republican	Tom B. Hoogestraat	2,424	49.9
Total votes		4,855	100.0

Iowa Senate, District 9 General Election, 2002
Party	Candidate	Votes	%
Republican	Bob Brunkhorst	11,952	60.1
Democratic	Pat Taylor	7,925	39.9
Total votes		19,877	100.0
Republican hold			

=== District 11 ===
Iowa Senate, District 11 General Election, 2002
Party	Candidate	Votes	%
Democratic	Bill Dotzler	10,820	66.4
Republican	Melvina B. Scott	5,482	33.6
Total votes		16,302	100.0
Democratic gain from Republican			

=== District 13 ===
Iowa Senate, District 13 Democratic Primary Election, 2002
Party	Candidate	Votes	%
Democratic	Roger Tabor Stewart	1,444	70.2
Democratic	Highland B. Nichols	614	29.8
Total votes		2,058	100.0

Iowa Senate, District 13 General Election, 2002
Party	Candidate	Votes	%
Democratic	Roger Tabor Stewart	9,589	54.7
Republican	Jerome F. Burken	7,586	43.3
Libertarian	Nelson B. Morris	343	2.0
Total votes		17,518	100.0
Democratic hold			

=== District 15 ===
Iowa Senate, District 15 General Election, 2002
Party	Candidate	Votes	%
Democratic	Robert Dvorsky (incumbent)	12,827	59.6
Republican	Jack Young	8,679	40.4
Total votes		21,506	100.0
Democratic hold			

=== District 16 ===
Iowa Senate, District 16 Republican Primary Election, 2002
Party	Candidate	Votes	%
Republican	Julie Hosch	2,278	77.2
Republican	Katherine Kitty Dirks	674	22.8
Total votes		2,952	100.0

Iowa Senate, District 16 General Election, 2002
Party	Candidate	Votes	%
Republican	Julie Hosch	11,023	51.2
Democratic	Tom Flynn (incumbent) (Note: Redistricted from district 17 to 16.)	10,519	48.8
Total votes		21,542	100.0
Republican hold			

=== District 17 ===
Iowa Senate, District 17 General Election, 2002
Party	Candidate	Votes	%
Democratic	Wally Horn (incumbent)	14,461	100.0
Total votes		14,461	100.0
Democratic hold			

=== District 19 ===
Iowa Senate, District 19 General Election, 2002
Party	Candidate	Votes	%
Republican	Chuck Larson	13,375	57.1
Democratic	Renee V. Sneitzer	10,044	42.9
Total votes		23,419	100.0
Republican hold			

=== District 20 ===
Iowa Senate, District 20 General Election, 2002
Party	Candidate	Votes	%
Republican	John Putney	12,263	61.5
Democratic	Donald W. Wanatee	7,678	38.5
Total votes		19,941	100.0
Republican gain from Democratic			

=== District 21 ===
Iowa Senate, District 21 Democratic Primary Election, 2002
Party	Candidate	Votes	%
Democratic	Dennis Black (incumbent)	2,972	71.5
Democratic	Joe Pirillo	1,182	28.5
Total votes		4,154	100.0

Iowa Senate, District 21 General Election, 2002
Party	Candidate	Votes	%
Democratic	Dennis Black (incumbent)	14,202	61.6
Republican	Ken Rogers	8,854	38.4
Total votes		23,056	100.0
Democratic gain from Republican			

=== District 23 ===
Iowa Senate, District 23 Democratic Primary Election, 2002
Party	Candidate	Votes	%
Democratic	Herman Quirmbach	1,555	51.4
Democratic	Karen Bolluyt	1,473	48.6
Total votes		3,028	100.0

Iowa Senate, District 23 General Election, 2002
Party	Candidate	Votes	%
Democratic	Herman Quirmbach	10,541	54.5
Republican	Barbara A. Finch	8,215	42.5
Libertarian	Eric Cooper	586	3.0
Total votes		19,342	100.0
Democratic hold			

=== District 25 ===
Iowa Senate, District 25 Republican Primary Election, 2002
Party	Candidate	Votes	%
Republican	Cherrie Wiese	2,109	54.3
Republican	Marvin Dick	1,778	45.7
Total votes		3,887	100.0

Iowa Senate, District 25 General Election, 2002
Party	Candidate	Votes	%
Democratic	Daryl Beall	11,400	58.5
Republican	Cherrie Wiese	8,083	41.5
Total votes		19,483	100.0
Democratic hold			

=== District 27 ===
Iowa Senate, District 27 General Election, 2002
Party	Candidate	Votes	%
Republican	Ron Wieck	9,724	52.2
Democratic	Maurice Welte	8,912	47.8
Total votes		18,636	100.0
Republican gain from Democratic			

=== District 28 ===
Iowa Senate, District 28 General Election, 2002
Party	Candidate	Votes	%
Republican	James Seymour	8,868	48.9
Democratic	Lenee Sinnott	7,857	43.3
Independent	Neal R. Gorham	1,413	7.8
Total votes		18,138	100.0
Republican hold			

=== District 29 ===
Iowa Senate, District 29 Republican Primary Election, 2002
Party	Candidate	Votes	%
Republican	Nancy Boettger (incumbent)	3,433	50.4
Republican	Jim Field	2,452	36.0
Republican	Patrick J. Hall	925	13.6
Total votes		6,810	100.0

Iowa Senate, District 29 General Election, 2002
Party	Candidate	Votes	%
Republican	Nancy Boettger (incumbent)	13,033	61.3
Democratic	Russell Joyce	8,236	38.7
Total votes		21,269	100.0
Republican gain from Democratic			

=== District 30 ===
Iowa Senate, District 30 General Election, 2002
Party	Candidate	Votes	%
Republican	Mary Kramer (incumbent)	17,801	89.6
Independent	Satro Narayan	2,067	10.4
Total votes		19,868	100.0
Republican hold			

=== District 31 ===
Iowa Senate, District 31 Republican Primary Election, 2002
Party	Candidate	Votes	%
Republican	Kaye Lozier	2,597	82.2
Republican	Barbara Stirling	564	17.8
Total votes		3,161	100.0

Iowa Senate, District 31 Democratic Primary Election, 2002
Party	Candidate	Votes	%
Democratic	Matt McCoy (incumbent)	3,275	62.9
Democratic	Chuck Gifford	1,929	37.1
Total votes		5,204	100.0

Iowa Senate, District 31 General Election, 2002
Party	Candidate	Votes	%
Democratic	Matt McCoy (incumbent)	12,004	56.5
Republican	Kaye Lozier	9,233	43.5
Total votes		21,237	100.0
Democratic hold			

=== District 33 ===
Iowa Senate, District 33 General Election, 2002
Party	Candidate	Votes	%
Democratic	Jack Hatch	10,311	100.0
Total votes		10,311	100.0
Democratic gain from Republican			

=== District 34 ===
Iowa Senate, District 34 General Election, 2002
Party	Candidate	Votes	%
Democratic	Dick Dearden (incumbent)	13,366	100.0
Total votes		13,366	100.0
Democratic hold			

=== District 35 ===
Iowa Senate, District 35 General Election, 2002
Party	Candidate	Votes	%
Republican	Jeff Lamberti (incumbent)	18,117	100.0
Total votes		18,117	100.0
Republican gain from Democratic			

=== District 37 ===
Iowa Senate, District 37 Republican Primary Election, 2002
Party	Candidate	Votes	%
Republican	Doug Shull	2,030	61.8
Republican	Brad Nordstrom	1,254	38.2
Total votes		3,284	100.0

Iowa Senate, District 37 General Election, 2002
Party	Candidate	Votes	%
Republican	Doug Shull	11,126	48.9
Democratic	Bill Fink (incumbent) (Note: Redistricted from district 45 to 37.)	10,623	46.7
Independent	Brad Nordstrom	1,002	4.4
Total votes		22,751	100.0
Republican hold			

=== District 39 ===
Iowa Senate, District 39 General Election, 2002
Party	Candidate	Votes	%
Democratic	Joe Bolkcom (incumbent)	14,559	100.0
Total votes		14,559	100.0
Democratic gain from Republican			

=== District 40 ===
Iowa Senate, District 40 General Election, 2002
Party	Candidate	Votes	%
Republican	Richard F. Drake (incumbent)	8,742	50.9
Democratic	Tom Fiegen (incumbent) (Note: Redistricted from district 20 to 40.)	8,432	49.1
Total votes		17,174	100.0
Republican hold			

=== District 41 ===
Iowa Senate, District 41 Republican Primary Election, 2002
Party	Candidate	Votes	%
Republican	Maggie Tinsman (incumbent)	3,213	72.7
Republican	Niky Bowles	1,207	27.3
Total votes		4,420	100.0

Iowa Senate, District 41 General Election, 2002
Party	Candidate	Votes	%
Republican	Maggie Tinsman (incumbent)	16,341	84.8
Libertarian	Mark Nelson	2,928	15.2
Total votes		19,269	100.0
Republican hold			

=== District 42 ===
Iowa Senate, District 42 General Election, 2002
Party	Candidate	Votes	%
Republican	Bryan Sievers	10,116	52.9
Democratic	Dennis Starling	9,013	47.1
Total votes		19,129	100.0
Republican gain from Democratic			

=== District 43 ===
Iowa Senate, District 43 General Election, 2002
Party	Candidate	Votes	%
Democratic	Joe Seng	11,043	68.3
Republican	John D. Gumpert	4,728	29.3
Libertarian	Rich Moroney	385	2.4
Total votes		16,156	100.0
Democratic gain from Republican			

=== District 44 ===
Iowa Senate, District 44 General Election, 2002
Party	Candidate	Votes	%
Democratic	Thomas G. Courtney	11,186	69.3
Independent	Charles Schulz	4,964	30.7
Total votes		16,150	100.0
Democratic gain from Republican			

=== District 45 ===
Iowa Senate, District 45 General Election, 2002
Party	Candidate	Votes	%
Republican	David Miller (incumbent)	10,744	53.3
Democratic	Mark Shearer (incumbent) (Note: Redistricted from district 49 to 45.)	9,410	46.7
Total votes		20,154	100.0
Republican gain from Democratic			

=== District 47 ===
Iowa Senate, District 47 Democratic Primary Election, 2002
Party	Candidate	Votes	%
Democratic	Keith Kreiman	4,286	80.9
Democratic	Theodore Buttel	1,015	19.1
Total votes		5,301	100.0

Iowa Senate, District 47 General Election, 2002
Party	Candidate	Votes	%
Democratic	Keith Kreiman	11,653	56.7
Republican	Galen M. Davis	8,915	43.3
Total votes		20,568	100.0
Democratic gain from Republican			

=== District 49 ===
Iowa Senate, District 49 General Election, 2002
Party	Candidate	Votes	%
Republican	Hubert Houser (incumbent)	15,572	100.0
Total votes		15,572	100.0
Republican gain from Democratic			

== See also ==
- United States elections, 2002
- United States House of Representatives elections in Iowa, 2002
- Elections in Iowa
