= 1998 Iowa Senate election =

- November 3, 1998

25 out of 50 seats in the Iowa State Senate 26 seats needed for a majority
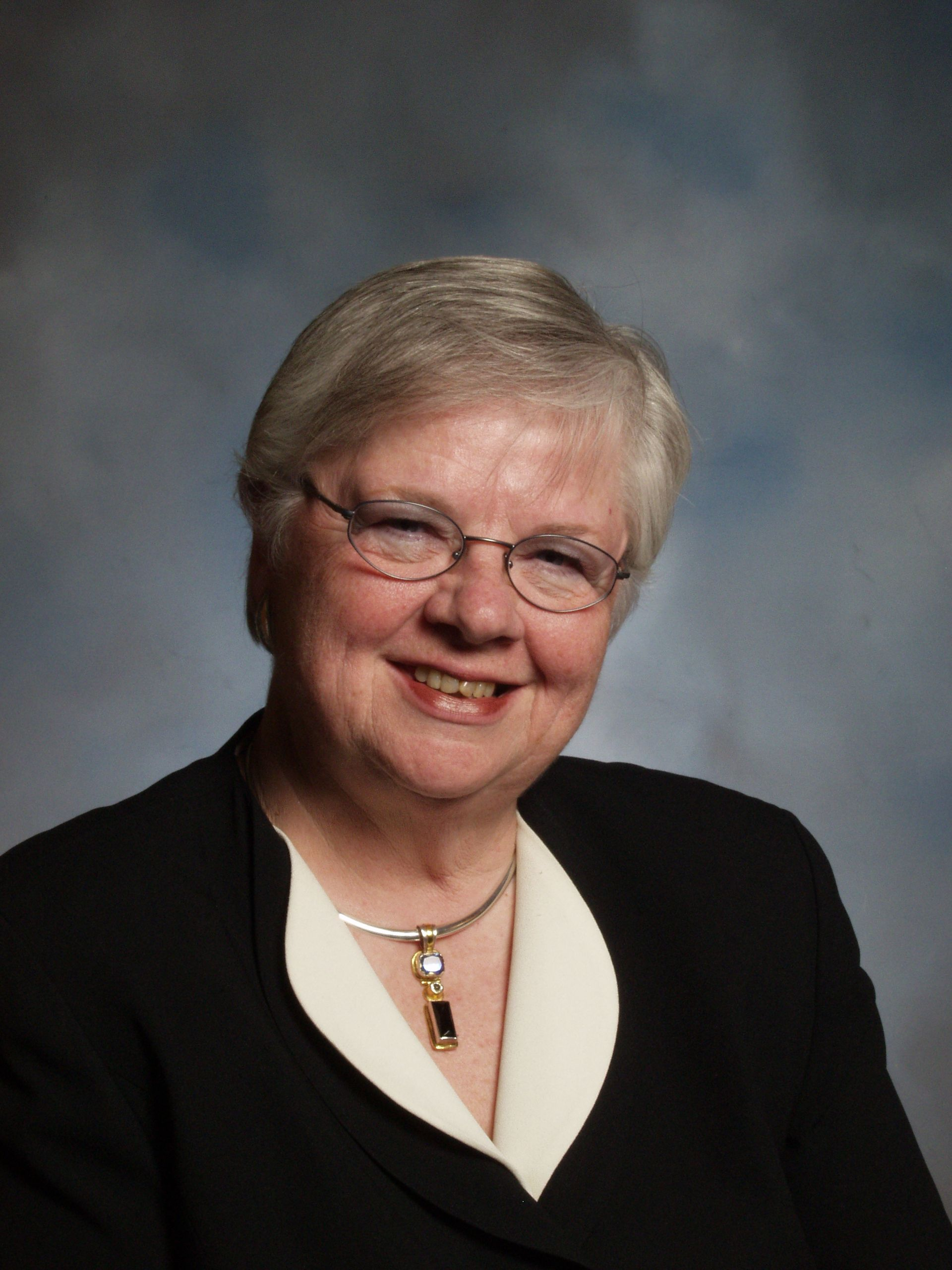

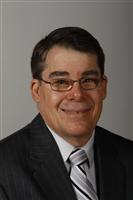
	Majority party	Minority party
Leader	Mary Kramer	Michael Gronstal
Party	Republican	Democratic
Leader's seat	37th	42nd
Last election	29	21
Seats before	28	22 (Note: In district 13, Sen. Lind (R) resigned and Sen. Harper (D) won a special election in 1997 to flip the seat to her party.)
Seats after	30	20
Seat change	▲2	▼2
President of the Senate before election
Mary Kramer
Republican
Elected President of the Senate
Mary Kramer
Republican

The 1998 Iowa State Senate elections took place as part of the biennial 1998 United States elections. Iowa voters elected state senators in half of the state senate's districts—the 25 odd-numbered state senate districts. State senators serve four-year terms in the Iowa State Senate, with half of the seats up for election each cycle. A statewide map of the 50 state Senate districts in the year 1998 is provided by the Iowa General Assembly here.

The primary election on June 2, 1998, determined which candidates appeared on the November 3, 1998 general election ballot. Primary election results can be obtained here. General election results can be obtained here.

Following the previous election in 1996, Republicans had control of the Iowa state Senate with 29 seats to Democrats' 21 seats. In a special election in District 13 in 1997 to fill a vacancy created by Sen. Jim Lind's (R) resignation, Democratic candidate Patricia M. "Pat" Harper (D) flipped the seat for her party. Therefore, on election day 1998, Republicans held 28 seats to Democrats' 22.

To reclaim control of the chamber from Republicans, the Democrats needed to net 4 Senate seats.

Republicans strengthened their control of the Iowa State Senate following the 1998 general election by netting two seats, resulting in Republicans holding 30 seats and Democrats having 20 seats after the election.

== Summary of Results ==
- NOTE: The 25 even-numbered districts did not have elections in 1998 so they are not listed here.

State Senate District	Incumbent	Party	Elected Senator	Party
1st	Steven D. Hansen	Dem	Steven D. Hansen	Democratic
3rd	Wilmer Rensink	Rep	Kenneth Veenstra	Republican
5th	Mary Lou Freeman	Rep	Mary Lou Freeman	Republican
7th	Rod Halvorson	Dem	Mike Sexton	Republican
9th	Stewart Iverson	Rep	Stewart Iverson	Republican
11th	John Jensen	Rep	John Jensen	Republican
13th	Patricia M. "Pat" Harper	Dem	Patricia M. "Pat" Harper	Democratic
15th	Allen Borlaug	Rep	Betty A. Soukup	Democratic
17th	Thomas L. Flynn	Dem	Thomas L. Flynn	Democratic
19th	Sheldon L. Rittmer	Rep	Sheldon L. Rittmer	Republican
21st	Maggie Tinsman	Rep	Maggie Tinsman	Republican
23rd	Mary Neuhauser	Dem	Joe Bolkcom	Democratic
25th	Robert Dvorsky	Dem	Robert Dvorsky	Democratic
27th	Wally Horn	Dem	Wally Horn	Democratic
29th	Dennis Black	Dem	Dennis Black	Democratic
31st	Johnie Hammond	Dem	Johnie Hammond	Democratic
33rd	William D. Palmer	Dem	Jeff Lamberti	Republican
35th	Dick Dearden	Dem	Dick Dearden	Democratic
37th	Mary Kramer	Rep	Mary Kramer	Republican
39th	Jo Ann M. Douglas	Rep	Jo Ann M. Johnson (Note: This is the same Senator, she just changed her last name.)	Republican
41st	Nancy Boettger	Rep	Nancy Boettger	Republican
43rd	Derryl McLaren	Rep	Derryl McLaren	Republican
45th	Bill Fink	Dem	Bill Fink	Democratic
47th	Donald Gettings	Dem	David P. Miller	Republican
49th	Tom Vilsack	Dem	Mark Shearer	Democratic

== Detailed Results ==
- Reminder: Only odd-numbered Iowa Senate seats were up for election in 1998; therefore, even-numbered seats did not have elections in 1998 & are not shown.
- Note: If a district does not list a primary, then that district did not have a competitive primary (i.e., there may have only been one candidate file for that district).

=== District 1 ===
Iowa Senate, District 1 General Election, 1998
Party	Candidate	Votes	%
Democratic	Steven D. Hansen (incumbent)	8,421	61.2
Republican	Kathleen Hoffmann	5,337	38.8
Total votes		13,758	100.0
Democratic hold			

=== District 3 ===
Iowa Senate, District 3 General Election, 1998
Party	Candidate	Votes	%
Republican	Kenneth Veenstra	15,040	100.0
Total votes		15,040	100.0
Republican hold			

=== District 5 ===
Iowa Senate, District 5 General Election, 1998
Party	Candidate	Votes	%
Republican	Mary Lou Freeman (incumbent)	13,389	100.0
Total votes		13,389	100.0
Republican hold			

=== District 7 ===
Iowa Senate, District 7 General Election, 1998
Party	Candidate	Votes	%
Republican	Mike Sexton	9,245	51.5
Democratic	Rod Halvorson (incumbent)	8,712	48.5
Total votes		17,957	100.0
Republican gain from Democratic			

=== District 9 ===
Iowa Senate, District 9 General Election, 1998
Party	Candidate	Votes	%
Republican	Stewart Iverson (incumbent)	12,472	66.4
Democratic	Jim Murra	6,300	33.6
Total votes		18,772	100.0
Republican hold			

=== District 11 ===
Iowa Senate, District 11 General Election, 1998
Party	Candidate	Votes	%
Republican	John W. Jensen (incumbent)	14,957	100.0
Total votes		14,957	100.0
Republican hold			

=== District 13 ===
Iowa Senate, District 13 General Election, 1998
Party	Candidate	Votes	%
Democratic	Patricia Harper (incumbent)	10,469	63.6
Republican	Mike Lanigan	5,998	36.4
Total votes		16,467	100.0
Democratic hold			

=== District 15 ===
Iowa Senate, District 15 General Election, 1998
Party	Candidate	Votes	%
Democratic	Betty Soukup	10,453	50.3
Republican	Allen Borlaug (incumbent)	10,324	49.7
Total votes		20,777	100.0
Democratic gain from Republican			

=== District 17 ===
Iowa Senate, District 17 General Election, 1998
Party	Candidate	Votes	%
Democratic	Tom Flynn (incumbent)	13,067	100.0
Total votes		13,067	100.0
Democratic hold			

=== District 19 ===
Iowa Senate, District 19 General Election, 1998
Party	Candidate	Votes	%
Republican	Sheldon L. Rittmer (incumbent)	10,586	100.0
Total votes		10,586	100.0
Republican hold			

=== District 21 ===
Iowa Senate, District 21 Republican Primary Election, 1998
Party	Candidate	Votes	%
Republican	Maggie Tinsman (incumbent)	2,931	42.5
Republican	Philip B. Allen, Jr.	2,650	47.5
Total votes		5,581	100.0

Iowa Senate, District 21 General Election, 1998
Party	Candidate	Votes	%
Republican	Maggie Tinsman (incumbent)	12,550	67.8
Democratic	Tommy Jacobson	5,960	32.2
Total votes		18,510	100.0
Republican hold			

=== District 23 ===
Iowa Senate, District 23 General Election, 1998
Party	Candidate	Votes	%
Democratic	Joe Bolkcom	12,513	100.0
Total votes		12,513	100.0
Democratic hold			

=== District 25 ===
Iowa Senate, District 25 General Election, 1998
Party	Candidate	Votes	%
Democratic	Robert Dvorsky (incumbent)	13,301	64.4
Republican	Mary Louise Howard	7,368	35.6
Total votes		20,669	100.0
Democratic hold			

=== District 27 ===
Iowa Senate, District 27 General Election, 1998
Party	Candidate	Votes	%
Democratic	Wally Horn (incumbent)	13,653	100.0
Total votes		13,653	100.0
Democratic hold			

=== District 29 ===
Iowa Senate, District 29 Republican Primary Election, 1998
Party	Candidate	Votes	%
Republican	Bruce Rhoads	1,675	62.1
Republican	Joseph R. Hudson	552	20.5
Republican	Rick Phillips	470	17.4
Total votes		2,697	100.0

Iowa Senate, District 29 General Election, 1998
Party	Candidate	Votes	%
Democratic	Dennis Black (incumbent)	12,642	60.6
Republican	Bruce Rhoads	8,216	39.4
Total votes		20,858	100.0
Democratic hold			

=== District 31 ===
Iowa Senate, District 31 Republican Primary Election, 1998
Party	Candidate	Votes	%
Republican	Norman A. Luiken	1,735	70.3
Republican	Jerry Litzel	733	29.7
Total votes		2,468	100.0

Iowa Senate, District 31 General Election, 1998
Party	Candidate	Votes	%
Democratic	Johnie Hammond (incumbent)	9,428	55.6
Republican	Norman A. Luiken	7,524	44.4
Total votes		16,952	100.0
Democratic hold			

=== District 33 ===
Iowa Senate, District 33 General Election, 1998
Party	Candidate	Votes	%
Republican	Jeff Lamberti	17,147	84.5
Reform	Alan Palmer	3,146	15.5
Total votes		20,293	100.0
Republican gain from Democratic			

=== District 35 ===
Iowa Senate, District 35 General Election, 1998
Party	Candidate	Votes	%
Democratic	Dick Dearden (incumbent)	10,538	71.6
Republican	Bert Wagoner, Jr.	4,172	28.4
Total votes		14,710	100.0
Democratic hold			

=== District 37 ===
Iowa Senate, District 37 General Election, 1998
Party	Candidate	Votes	%
Republican	Mary Kramer (incumbent)	13,194	51.6
Democratic	Bill Reichardt	12,136	47.4
Reform	Eric William Gunderson	246	1.0
Total votes		25,576	100.0
Republican hold			

=== District 39 ===
Iowa Senate, District 39 General Election, 1998
Party	Candidate	Votes	%
Republican	Jo Ann Douglas (incumbent)	13,708	56.6
Democratic	Brent A. Halling	10,513	43.4
Total votes		24,221	100.0
Republican hold			

=== District 41 ===
Iowa Senate, District 41 General Election, 1998
Party	Candidate	Votes	%
Republican	Nancy Boettger (incumbent)	12,082	68.5
Democratic	John L. Jensen	5,560	31.5
Total votes		17,642	100.0
Republican hold			

=== District 43 ===
Iowa Senate, District 43 General Election, 1998
Party	Candidate	Votes	%
Republican	Derryl McLaren (incumbent)	13,685	100.0
Total votes		13,685	100.0
Republican hold			

=== District 45 ===
Iowa Senate, District 45 General Election, 1998
Party	Candidate	Votes	%
Democratic	Bill Fink (incumbent)	10,988	56.7
Republican	Larry L. Hughes	8,387	43.3
Total votes		19,375	100.0
Democratic hold			

=== District 47 ===
Iowa Senate, District 47 General Election, 1998
Party	Candidate	Votes	%
Republican	David P. Miller	9,788	50.1
Democratic	Dan Gullion	8,530	43.6
Natural Law	Jonas Magram	1,236	6.3
Total votes		19,554	100.0
Republican gain from Democratic			

=== District 49 ===
Iowa Senate, District 49 General Election, 1998
Party	Candidate	Votes	%
Democratic	Mark Shearer	10,045	53.1
Republican	Richard Garrels	8,881	46.9
Total votes		18,926	100.0
Democratic hold			

== See also ==
- United States elections, 1998
- United States House of Representatives elections in Iowa, 1998
- Elections in Iowa
