= 1994 Iowa Senate election =

United States election

- November 8, 1994

25 out of 50 seats in the Iowa State Senate 26 seats needed for a majority
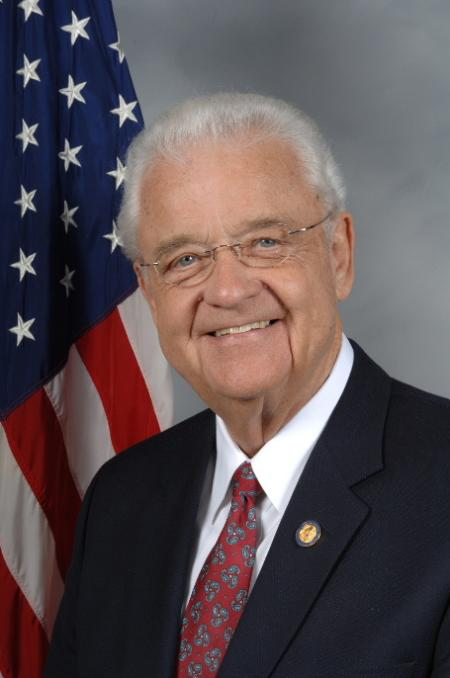

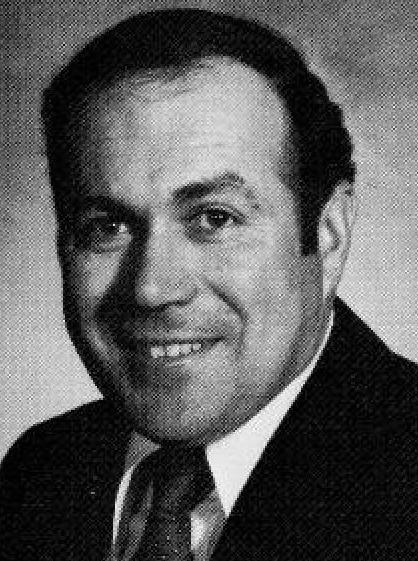
	Majority party	Minority party
Leader	Leonard Boswell	Jack Rife
Party	Democratic	Republican
Leader's seat	44th	20th
Last election	27	23
Seats before	27	23
Seats after	27	23
Seat change	Steady	Steady
President of the Senate before election
Leonard Boswell
Democratic
Elected President of the Senate
Leonard Boswell
Democratic

The 1994 Iowa State Senate elections took place as part of the biennial 1994 United States elections. Iowa voters elected state senators in half of the state senate's districts—the 25 odd-numbered state senate districts. State senators serve four-year terms in the Iowa State Senate, with half of the seats up for election each cycle. A statewide map of the 50 state Senate districts in the year 1994 is provided by the Iowa General Assembly here.

The primary election on June 7, 1994, determined which candidates appeared on the November 8, 1994 general election ballot. Primary election results can be obtained here. General election results can be obtained here.

Following the previous election in 1992, Democrats had control of the Iowa state Senate with 27 seats to Republicans' 23 seats.

To take control of the chamber from Democrats, the Republicans needed to net 3 Senate seats.

Democrats kept their control of the Iowa State Senate following the 1994 general election with the balance of power unchanged--Democrats holding 27 seats and Republicans having 23 seats after the election.

== Summary of Results ==
- NOTE: The 25 even-numbered districts did not have elections in 1994 so they are not listed here.

State Senate District	Incumbent	Party	Elected Senator	Party
1st	Al Sturgeon	Dem	Steven D. Hansen	Democratic
3rd	Wilmer Rensink	Rep	Wilmer Rensink	Republican
5th	Mary Lou Freeman	Rep	Mary Lou Freeman	Republican
7th	James B. Kersten	Rep	Rod Halvorson	Democratic
9th	Ray Taylor	Rep	Stewart Iverson	Republican
11th	John Jensen	Rep	John Jensen	Republican
13th	Jim Lind	Rep	Jim Lind	Republican
15th	Allen Borlaug	Rep	Allen Borlaug	Republican
17th	Joseph J. Welsh	Dem	Thomas L. Flynn	Democratic
19th	Sheldon L. Rittmer	Rep	Sheldon L. Rittmer	Republican
21st	Maggie Tinsman	Rep	Maggie Tinsman	Republican
23rd	Jean Hall Lloyd-Jones	Dem	Mary Neuhauser	Democratic
25th	Robert Dvorsky	Dem	Robert Dvorsky	Democratic
27th	Wally Horn	Dem	Wally Horn	Democratic
29th	Bill Dieleman	Dem	Dennis Black	Democratic
31st	Ralph Rosenberg	Dem	Johnie Hammond	Democratic
33rd	William D. Palmer	Dem	William D. Palmer	Democratic
35th	Florence Buhr	Dem	Dick Dearden	Democratic
37th	Mary Kramer	Rep	Mary Kramer	Republican
39th	James R. Riordan	Dem	Jo Ann M. Douglas (Note: She would later change her surname to 'Johnson.')	Republican
41st	Jack W. Hester	Rep	Nancy Boettger	Republican
43rd	Derryl McLaren	Rep	Derryl McLaren	Republican
45th	Bill Fink	Dem	Bill Fink	Democratic
47th	Donald Gettings	Dem	Donald Gettings	Democratic
49th	Tom Vilsack	Dem	Tom Vilsack	Democratic

== Detailed Results ==
- Reminder: Only odd-numbered Iowa Senate seats were up for election in 1994; therefore, even-numbered seats did not have elections in 1994 & are not shown.
- Note: If a district does not list a primary, then that district did not have a competitive primary (i.e., there may have only been one candidate file for that district).

=== District 1 ===
Iowa Senate, District 1 General Election, 1994
Party	Candidate	Votes	%
Democratic	Steven D. Hansen	8,971	57.0
Republican	Mike van Maanen	6,772	43.0
Total votes		15,743	100.0
Democratic hold			

=== District 3 ===
Iowa Senate, District 3 General Election, 1994
Party	Candidate	Votes	%
Republican	Wilmer Rensink (incumbent)	15,707	100.0
Total votes		15,707	100.0
Republican hold			

=== District 5 ===
Iowa Senate, District 5 General Election, 1994
Party	Candidate	Votes	%
Republican	Mary Lou Freeman (incumbent)	13,899	100.0
Total votes		13,899	100.0
Republican hold			

=== District 7 ===
Iowa Senate, District 7 Republican Primary Election, 1994
Party	Candidate	Votes	%
Republican	Kim L. Landhuis	3,579	57.0
Republican	Myron G. Groat	2,703	43.0
Total votes		6,282	100.0

Iowa Senate, District 7 General Election, 1994
Party	Candidate	Votes	%
Democratic	Rod Halvorson	10,379	52.3
Republican	Kim L. Landhuis	9,472	47.7
Total votes		19,851	100.0
Democratic gain from Republican			

=== District 9 ===
Iowa Senate, District 9 General Election, 1994
Party	Candidate	Votes	%
Republican	Stewart Iverson	14,271	70.0
Democratic	Herbert D. Muhlenbruch	6,122	30.0
Total votes		20,393	100.0
Republican hold			

=== District 11 ===
Iowa Senate, District 11 General Election, 1994
Party	Candidate	Votes	%
Republican	John W. Jensen (incumbent)	13,884	100.0
Total votes		13,884	100.0
Republican hold			

=== District 13 ===
Iowa Senate, District 13 General Election, 1994
Party	Candidate	Votes	%
Republican	Jim Lind (incumbent)	8,990	95.1
Libertarian	David A. Neelans	459	4.9
Total votes		9,449	100.0
Republican hold			

=== District 15 ===
Iowa Senate, District 15 General Election, 1994
Party	Candidate	Votes	%
Republican	Allen Borlaug (incumbent)	12,177	57.4
Democratic	James A. Erb	9,040	42.6
Total votes		21,217	100.0
Republican hold			

=== District 17 ===
Iowa Senate, District 17 Democratic Primary Election, 1994
Party	Candidate	Votes	%
Democratic	Tom Flynn	1,963	63.3
Democratic	Vince Dolphin	1,136	36.7
Total votes		3,099	100.0

Iowa Senate, District 17 General Election, 1994
Party	Candidate	Votes	%
Democratic	Tom Flynn	9,660	51.4
Republican	Jerry Becker	8,968	47.7
Grassroots	Mike Lincoln	160	0.9
Total votes		18,788	100.0
Democratic hold			

=== District 19 ===
Iowa Senate, District 19 General Election, 1994
Party	Candidate	Votes	%
Republican	Sheldon L. Rittmer (incumbent)	11,307	100.0
Total votes		11,307	100.0
Republican hold			

=== District 21 ===
Iowa Senate, District 21 General Election, 1994
Party	Candidate	Votes	%
Republican	Maggie Tinsman (incumbent)	12,473	100.0
Total votes		12,473	100.0
Republican hold			

=== District 23 ===
Iowa Senate, District 23 General Election, 1994
Party	Candidate	Votes	%
Democratic	Mary Neuhauser	13,729	100.0
Total votes		13,729	100.0
Democratic hold			

=== District 25 ===
Iowa Senate, District 25 General Election, 1994
Party	Candidate	Votes	%
Democratic	Robert Dvorsky (incumbent)	11,679	58.0
Republican	Rosie Dalton	8,445	42.0
Total votes		20,124	100.0
Democratic hold			

=== District 27 ===
Iowa Senate, District 27 General Election, 1994
Party	Candidate	Votes	%
Democratic	Wally Horn (incumbent)	12,502	100.0
Total votes		12,502	100.0
Democratic hold			

=== District 29 ===
Iowa Senate, District 29 General Election, 1994
Party	Candidate	Votes	%
Democratic	Dennis Black	13,180	61.4
Republican	Kay E. Ward	8,273	38.6
Total votes		21,453	100.0
Democratic hold			

=== District 31 ===
Iowa Senate, District 31 Republican Primary Election, 1994
Party	Candidate	Votes	%
Republican	Paul D. Smith	2,222	57.8
Republican	Joseph M. Isenberg	1,619	42.2
Total votes		3,841	100.0

Iowa Senate, District 31 General Election, 1994
Party	Candidate	Votes	%
Democratic	Johnie Hammond	10,462	59.6
Republican	Paul D. Smith	7,102	40.4
Total votes		17,564	100.0
Democratic hold			

=== District 33 ===
Iowa Senate, District 33 General Election, 1994
Party	Candidate	Votes	%
Democratic	William D. Palmer (incumbent)	12,561	51.5
Republican	N. John Boehm	11,848	48.5
Total votes		24,409	100.0
Democratic hold			

=== District 35 ===
Iowa Senate, District 35 General Election, 1994
Party	Candidate	Votes	%
Democratic	Dick Dearden	11,710	68.7
Republican	Bert Wagoner, Jr.	5,323	31.3
Total votes		17,033	100.0
Democratic hold			

=== District 37 ===
Iowa Senate, District 37 General Election, 1994
Party	Candidate	Votes	%
Republican	Mary Kramer (incumbent)	20,373	100.0
Total votes		20,373	100.0
Republican hold			

=== District 39 ===
Iowa Senate, District 39 General Election, 1994
Party	Candidate	Votes	%
Republican	Jo Ann Douglas	14,268	60.0
Democratic	Liz Garst	8,570	36.1
Independent	Verlyn Leroy Hayes	928	3.9
Total votes		23,766	100.0
Republican gain from Democratic			

=== District 41 ===
Iowa Senate, District 41 General Election, 1994
Party	Candidate	Votes	%
Republican	Nancy Boettger	12,408	62.1
Democratic	Orv Roecker	7,564	37.9
Total votes		19,972	100.0
Republican hold			

=== District 43 ===
Iowa Senate, District 43 General Election, 1994
Party	Candidate	Votes	%
Republican	Derryl McLaren (incumbent)	14,365	100.0
Total votes		14,365	100.0
Republican hold			

=== District 45 ===
Iowa Senate, District 45 General Election, 1994
Party	Candidate	Votes	%
Democratic	Bill Fink (incumbent)	10,423	52.3
Republican	Kay King	9,501	47.7
Total votes		19,924	100.0
Democratic hold			

=== District 47 ===
Iowa Senate, District 47 General Election, 1994
Party	Candidate	Votes	%
Democratic	Donald Gettings (incumbent)	11,674	80.1
Natural Law	Ed Malloy	2,895	19.9
Total votes		14,569	100.0
Democratic hold			

=== District 49 ===
Iowa Senate, District 49 General Election, 1994
Party	Candidate	Votes	%
Democratic	Tom Vilsack (incumbent)	12,288	100.0
Total votes		12,288	100.0
Democratic hold			

== See also ==
- United States elections, 1994
- United States House of Representatives elections in Iowa, 1994
- Elections in Iowa
