= List of members of the 89th session of the Iowa Senate =

Iowa Senate districts, 2012–2022

The Iowa Senate is the upper house of the Iowa General Assembly, the legislature of the U.S. state of Iowa. One State Senator is elected from each of the state's 50 electoral districts, with each Senate district containing two House of Representatives districts. The 2021–23 term is part of the 89th General Assembly. As of January 11, 2021, 18 of those seats are held by Democrats and 32 by Republicans. The presiding officer is the President of the Senate, who is chosen by the majority party and elected by the Senate. In addition, senators elect a President pro tempore, chosen in the same manner as the President, and the respective party caucuses elect a majority and minority leader, a majority and minority whip, and assistant party leaders.

Senators serve for four-year terms and are elected in even-numbered years, with half of the Senate elected every two years in the general election on election day, as part of the presidential and midterm elections. Newly elected senators are sworn in and begin work on the second Monday of January. Should a senator resign from office before his or her term expires, the governor calls a special election to replace the senator. Senators are not term-limited.

Senators generally serve on several standing committees and often serve on joint appropriations subcommittees, permanent statutory committees and various boards and commissions.

== Party composition ==
Party composition as of January 11, 2021.
Affiliation	Members
Republican	32
Democratic	18
Total	50

== Leadership ==
Senate leadership as of January 11, 2021.
Position	Name	Party	District
President of the Senate	Jake Chapman	Republican	10
President pro tempore	Brad Zaun	Republican	20
Majority Leader	Jack Whitver	Republican	19
Minority Leader	Zach Wahls	Democratic	37

== Senators ==
Iowa senators as of January 11, 2021
District	Jurisdiction(s) represented	Portrait	Senator	Party	First elected	Standing committee leader	Appropriations subcommittee member
1	Clay, Dickinson, Lyon, Osceola and Palo Alto		Zach Whiting	Republican	2018	N/A	Transportation, Infrastructure, and Capitals (Vice Chair)
2	Cherokee, O'Brien, Plymouth and Sioux		Jeff Taylor	Republican	2020	Education (Vice Chair)	
3	Plymouth and Woodbury		Jim Carlin	Republican	2018	Ethics (Vice Chair)	Justice System (Vice Chair)
4	Emmet, Hancock, Kossuth, Winnebago and Wright	Official Portrait for the 85th General Assembly	Dennis Guth	Republican	2012	N/A	Administration and Regulation (Chair)
5	Calhoun, Humboldt, Pocahontas and Webster		Tim Kraayenbrink	Republican	2014	Appropriations (Chair)	
6	Audubon, Buena Vista, Carroll, Crawford and Sac		Craig Williams	Republican	2020	Government Oversight (Vice Chair)	
7	Woodbury		Jackie Smith	Democratic	2018	Local Government (Ranking Member)	Education (Ranking Member)
8	Pottawattamie		Dan Dawson	Republican	2016	Ways and Means (Chair)	
9	Crawford, Harrison, Ida, Monona, Shelby and Woodbury		Jason Schultz	Republican	2014	Commerce (Chair); Government Oversight (Chair)	
10	Adair, Cass, Dallas, Guthrie and Polk	Official Portrait for the 85th General Assembly	Jake Chapman	Republican	2012	Rules and Administration (Vice Chair)	
11	Adams, Cass, Pottawattamie and Union		Tom Shipley	Republican	2014	Local Government (Chair)	Agriculture and Natural Resources (Vice Chair)
12	Fremont, Mills, Montgomery, Page, Ringgold and Taylor		Mark Costello	Republican	2014 (Note: First elected in a December 30, 2014 special election.)	Human Resources (Vice Chair)	Health and Human Services (Chair)
13	Madison and Warren		Julian Garrett	Republican	2013 (Note: First elected in a November 19, 2013 special election.)	Judiciary (Vice Chair)	Justice System (Chair)
14	Clarke, Decatur, Jasper, Lucas, Marion and Wayne		Amy Sinclair	Republican	2012	Education (Chair)	
15	Jasper and Polk		Zach Nunn	Republican	2018	N/A	
16	Polk		Nate Boulton	Democratic	2016	Labor and Business Relations (Ranking Member)	
17	Polk		Tony Bisignano	Democratic	2014	State Government (Ranking Member)	
18	Polk	Official Portrait for the 85th General Assembly	Janet Petersen	Democratic	2012	N/A	Transportation, Infrastructure, and Capitals (Ranking Member)
19	Polk	Official Portrait for the 85th General Assembly	Jack Whitver	Republican	2011 (Note: First elected in a January 18, 2011 special election.)	Rules and Administration (Chair)	
20	Polk	Official Portrait for the 85th General Assembly	Brad Zaun	Republican	2004	Judiciary (Chair)	
21	Polk and Warren		Claire Celsi	Democratic	2018	Government Oversight (Ranking Member)	Administration and Regulation (Ranking Member)
22	Dallas and Polk		Sarah Trone Garriott	Democratic	2020	Natural Resources and Environment (Ranking Member)	
23	Story	Official Portrait for the 85th General Assembly	Herman Quirmbach	Democratic	2002	Education (Ranking Member)	
24	Boone, Greene, Hamilton, Story and Webster		Jesse Green	Republican	2020	Labor and Business Relations (Vice Chair)	Education (Vice Chair)
25	Butler, Grundy, Hardin and Story		Annette Sweeney	Republican	2018	Agriculture (Vice Chair); Natural Resources and Environment (Chair)	
26	Cerro Gordo, Chickasaw, Floyd, Howard, Mitchell, Winneshiek and Worth		Waylon Brown	Republican	2016	Transportation (Chair)	
27	Butler, Cerro Gordo and Franklin	Official Portrait for the 85th General Assembly	Amanda Ragan	Democratic	2002 (Note: First elected in a March 12, 2002 special election.)	N/A	Health and Human Services (Ranking Member)
28	Allamakee, Clayton, Fayette and Winneshiek		Mike Klimesh	Republican	2020	Local Government (Vice Chair)	
29	Dubuque, Jones and Jackson		Carrie Koelker	Republican	2018	Commerce (Vice Chair); Ethics (Chair)	Economic Development (Chair)
30	Black Hawk		Eric Giddens	Democratic	2019	Transportation (Ranking Member); Veterans Affairs (Ranking Member)	
31	Black Hawk	Official Portrait for the 85th General Assembly	William Dotzler	Democratic	2002	N/A	Economic Development (Ranking Member)
32	Black Hawk, Bremer, Buchanan and Fayette		Craig Johnson	Republican	2016	N/A	Transportation, Infrastructure, and Capitals (Chair)
33	Linn	Official Portrait for the 85th General Assembly	Rob Hogg	Democratic	2006	N/A	
34	Linn	Official Portrait for the 85th General Assembly	Liz Mathis	Democratic	2011 (Note: First elected in a November 8, 2011 special election.)	Human Resources (Ranking Member)	Agriculture and Natural Resources (Ranking Member)
35	Linn	Official Portrait for the 85th General Assembly	Todd Taylor	Democratic	2018	N/A	Justice System (Ranking Member)
36	Black Hawk, Marshall and Tama		Jeff Edler	Republican	2016	Human Resources (Chair)	Health and Human Services (Vice Chair)
37	Cedar, Johnson and Muscatine		Zach Wahls	Democratic	2018	Rules and Administration (Ranking Member)	
38	Benton, Iowa and Poweshiek		Dawn Driscoll	Republican	2020	Natural Resources and Environment (Vice Chair)	
39	Johnson, Keokuk and Washington		Kevin Kinney	Democrat	2014	Agriculture (Ranking Member); Judiciary (Ranking Member)	
40	Appanoose, Mahaska, Marion, Monroe and Wapello	Official Portrait for the 85th General Assembly	Ken Rozenboom	Republican	2012	N/A	Agriculture and Natural Resources (Chair)
41	Davis, Jefferson, Van Buren and Wapello		Adrian Dickey	Republican	2021 (Note: First elected in a January 26, 2021 special election.)	Labor and Business Relations (Chair); Transportation (Vice Chair), Labor, and Ways and Means	
42	Henry, Lee, Jefferson and Washington		Jeff Reichman	Republican	2020	Veterans Affairs (Vice Chair)	
43	Johnson	Official Portrait for the 85th General Assembly	Joe Bolkcom	Democratic	1998	Appropriations (Ranking Member)	
44	Des Moines, Louisa and Muscatine		Tim Goodwin	Republican	2020	Ways and Means (Vice Chair)	
45	Scott		Jim Lykam	Democratic	2016 (Note: First elected in a December 27, 2016 special election.)	Commerce (Ranking Member)	
46	Muscatine and Scott		Mark Lofgren	Republican	2016	Veterans Affairs (Chair); Appropriations (Vice Chair)	
47	Scott	Official Portrait for the 85th General Assembly	Roby Smith	Republican	2010	State Government (Chair)	
48	Buchanan, Delaware, Jones and Linn	Official Portrait for the 85th General Assembly	Dan Zumbach	Republican	2012	Agriculture (Chair)	Administration and Regulation (Vice Chair)
49	Clinton and Scott		Chris Cournoyer	Republican	2018	State Government (Vice Chair)	Education (Chair)
50	Dubuque	Official Portrait for the 85th General Assembly	Pam Jochum	Democratic	2008	Ethics (Ranking Member); Veterans Affairs (Ranking Member)	

== See also ==
- List of current members of the Iowa House of Representatives
- Iowa Senate
