= List of Iowa General Assemblies =

List of Iowa state legislatures

This is a list of Iowa General Assemblies, the legislature of the U.S. state of Iowa. This list only covers regular sessions.

== Territorial Assemblies ==
These are the meetings of the Iowa Territory legislature. The upper chamber was known as the council instead of the senate.

Territorial Assemblies
Number	Convened	Adjourned
1st Legislative Assembly of the Territory of Iowa	November 12, 1838	January 25, 1839
2nd Legislative Assembly of the Territory of Iowa	November 4, 1839	January 17, 1840
3rd Legislative Assembly of the Territory of Iowa	November 2, 1840	January 15, 1841
4th Legislative Assembly of the Territory of Iowa	December 6, 1841	February 18, 1842
5th Legislative Assembly of the Territory of Iowa	December 5, 1842	February 17, 1843
6th Legislative Assembly of the Territory of Iowa	December 4, 1843	February 16, 1844
7th Legislative Assembly of the Territory of Iowa	May 5, 1845	June 11, 1845
8th Legislative Assembly of the Territory of Iowa	December 1, 1845	January 19, 1846

== Post-Incorporation sessions ==
These are the sessions of the current legislature. Assemblies with 2 dates signify that there were 2 regular sessions.

Name	Convened	Adjourned	Last election
Iowa Constitution of 1846
1st Iowa General Assembly	November 30, 1846	February 25, 1847	1846 Iowa Senate election
2nd Iowa General Assembly	December 4, 1848	January 15, 1849	1848 Iowa Senate election
3rd Iowa General Assembly	December 2, 1850	February 5, 1851	
4th Iowa General Assembly	December 6, 1852	January 24, 1853	
5th Iowa General Assembly	December 4, 1854	January 25, 1855	
6th Iowa General Assembly	December 1, 1856	January 29, 1857	
Iowa Constitution of 1857
7th Iowa General Assembly	January 11, 1858	March 23, 1858	
8th Iowa General Assembly	January 9, 1860	April 3, 1860	
9th Iowa General Assembly	January 13, 1862	April 8, 1862	
10th Iowa General Assembly	January 11, 1864	March 29, 1864	
11th Iowa General Assembly	January 8, 1866	April 3, 1866	
12th Iowa General Assembly	January 13, 1868	April 8, 1868	
13th Iowa General Assembly	January 10, 1870	April 13, 1870	
14th Iowa General Assembly	January 8, 1872	April 23, 1872	
15th Iowa General Assembly	January 12, 1874	March 19, 1874	
16th Iowa General Assembly	January 10, 1876	March 16, 1876	
17th Iowa General Assembly	January 14, 1878	March 26, 1878	
18th Iowa General Assembly	January 12, 1880	March 27, 1880	
19th Iowa General Assembly	January 9, 1882	March 17, 1882	
20th Iowa General Assembly	January 14, 1884	April 2, 1884	
21st Iowa General Assembly	January 11, 1886	April 13, 1886	
22nd Iowa General Assembly	January 9, 1888	April 10, 1888	
23rd Iowa General Assembly	January 13, 1890	April 15, 1890	
24th Iowa General Assembly	January 11, 1892	March 30, 1892	
25th Iowa General Assembly	January 8, 1894	April 6, 1894	
26th Iowa General Assembly	January 13, 1896	April 11, 1896	
27th Iowa General Assembly	January 10, 1898	April 1, 1898	
28th Iowa General Assembly	January 8, 1900	April 6, 1900	
29th Iowa General Assembly	January 13, 1902	April 11, 1902	
30th Iowa General Assembly	January 11, 1904	April 12, 1904	
31st Iowa General Assembly	January 8, 1906	April 6, 1906	
32nd Iowa General Assembly	January 14, 1907	April 9, 1907	
33rd Iowa General Assembly	January 11, 1909	April 9, 1909	
34th Iowa General Assembly	January 9, 1911	April 12, 1911	
35th Iowa General Assembly	January 13, 1913	April 19, 1913	
36th Iowa General Assembly	January 11, 1915	April 17, 1915	
37th Iowa General Assembly	January 8, 1917	April 14, 1917	
38th Iowa General Assembly	January 13, 1919	April 19, 1919	
39th Iowa General Assembly	January 10, 1921	April 8, 1921	
40th Iowa General Assembly	January 8, 1923	April 17, 1923	
41st Iowa General Assembly	January 12, 1925	April 3, 1925	
42nd Iowa General Assembly	January 10, 1927	April 15, 1927	
43rd Iowa General Assembly	January 14, 1929	April 12, 1929	
44th Iowa General Assembly	January 12, 1931	April 15, 1931	
45th Iowa General Assembly	January 9, 1933	April 20, 1933	
46th Iowa General Assembly	January 14, 1935	April 23, 1935	
47th Iowa General Assembly	January 11, 1937	April 20, 1937	
48th Iowa General Assembly	January 9, 1939	April 26, 1939	
49th Iowa General Assembly	January 13, 1941	April 10, 1941	
50th Iowa General Assembly	January 11, 1943	April 8, 1943	
51st Iowa General Assembly	January 8, 1945	April 12, 1945	
52nd Iowa General Assembly	January 13, 1947	April 25, 1947	
53rd Iowa General Assembly	January 10, 1949	April 20, 1949	
54th Iowa General Assembly	January 8, 1951	April 17, 1951	
55th Iowa General Assembly	January 12, 1953	April 29, 1953	
56th Iowa General Assembly	January 10, 1955	April 29, 1955	
57th Iowa General Assembly	January 14, 1957	May 3, 1957	
58th Iowa General Assembly	January 12, 1959	May 7, 1959	
59th Iowa General Assembly	January 9, 1961	May 6, 1961	
60th Iowa General Assembly	January 14, 1963	May 18, 1963	
61st Iowa General Assembly	January 11, 1965	June 4, 1965	
62nd Iowa General Assembly	January 9, 1967	July 2, 1967	
63rd Iowa General Assembly	January 13, 1969; January 12, 1970	May 23, 1969; April 16, 1970	
64th Iowa General Assembly	January 11, 1971; January 10, 1972	June 19, 1971; March 24, 1972	
65th Iowa General Assembly	January 8, 1973; January 14, 1974	June 24, 1973; May 4, 1974	
66th Iowa General Assembly	January 13, 1975; January 12, 1976	June 20, 1975; May 29, 1976	
67th Iowa General Assembly	January 10, 1977; January 9, 1978	June 13, 1977; July 16, 1978	
68th Iowa General Assembly	January 8, 1979; January 14, 1980	May 11, 1979; April 26, 1980	
69th Iowa General Assembly	January 12, 1981; January 11, 1982	May 22, 1981; April 24, 1982	
70th Iowa General Assembly	January 10, 1983; January 9, 1984	May 14, 1983; April 20, 1984	
71st Iowa General Assembly	January 14, 1985; January 13, 1986	May 4, 1985; May 2, 1986	
72nd Iowa General Assembly	January 12, 1987; January 11, 1988	May 10, 1987; April 17, 1988	
73rd Iowa General Assembly	January 9, 1989; January 8, 1990	May 7, 1989; April 8, 1990	
74th Iowa General Assembly	January 14, 1991; January 13, 1992	May 12, 1991; May 4, 1992	
75th Iowa General Assembly	January 11, 1993; January 10, 1994	May 2, 1993; April 20, 1994	
76th Iowa General Assembly	January 9, 1995; January 8, 1996	May 4, 1995; May 1, 1996	
77th Iowa General Assembly	January 13, 1997; January 12, 1998	April 29, 1997; April 22, 1998	
78th Iowa General Assembly	January 11, 1999; January 10, 2000	April 29, 1999; April 26, 2000	November 1998: Senate
79th Iowa General Assembly	January 8, 2001; January 14, 2002	May 8, 2001; April 12, 2002	November 2000: Senate
80th Iowa General Assembly	January 13, 2003; January 12, 2004	May 1, 2003; April 20, 2004	November 2002: Senate
81st Iowa General Assembly	January 10, 2005; January 9, 2006	May 20, 2005; May 3, 2006	November 2004: Senate
82nd Iowa General Assembly	January 8, 2007; January 14, 2008	April 28, 2007; April 26, 2008	November 2006: House, Senate
83rd Iowa General Assembly	January 12, 2009; January 11, 2010	April 26, 2009; March 30, 2010	November 2008: House, Senate
84th Iowa General Assembly	January 10, 2011; January 9, 2012	June 30, 2011; May 9, 2012	November 2010: Senate
85th Iowa General Assembly	January 14, 2013; January 13, 2014	May 23, 2013; May 2, 2014	November 2012: Senate
86th Iowa General Assembly	January 12, 2015; January 11, 2016	June 5, 2015; April 29, 2016	November 2014: Senate
87th Iowa General Assembly	January 9, 2017; January 8, 2018	April 22, 2017; May 5, 2018	November 2016: House, Senate
88th Iowa General Assembly	January 14, 2019; January 13, 2020	April 27, 2019; June 14, 2020	November 2018: House, Senate
89th Iowa General Assembly; List of senators	January 11, 2021; January 10, 2022	October 5, 2021; May 24, 2022	November 2020: House, Senate
90th Iowa General Assembly; List of representatives, senators	January 9, 2023; January 8, 2024	May 4, 2023; April 19, 2024	November 2022: House, Senate
91st Iowa General Assembly; List of representatives, senators	January 13, 2025; January 12, 2026	May 2, 2025; May 3, 2026	November 5, 2024: House, Senate

== See also ==
- List of speakers of the Iowa House of Representatives
- List of governors of Iowa
- Constitution of Iowa
- Politics of Iowa
- Elections in Iowa
- Iowa State Capitol
- Historical outline of Iowa
- Lists of United States state legislative sessions
