= Senator Shearer =

Senator Shearer may refer to:

- Conrad Shearer (1873–1948), Wisconsin State Senate
- Mark Shearer (born 1952), Iowa State Senate
