= Becky Schmitz =

American politician

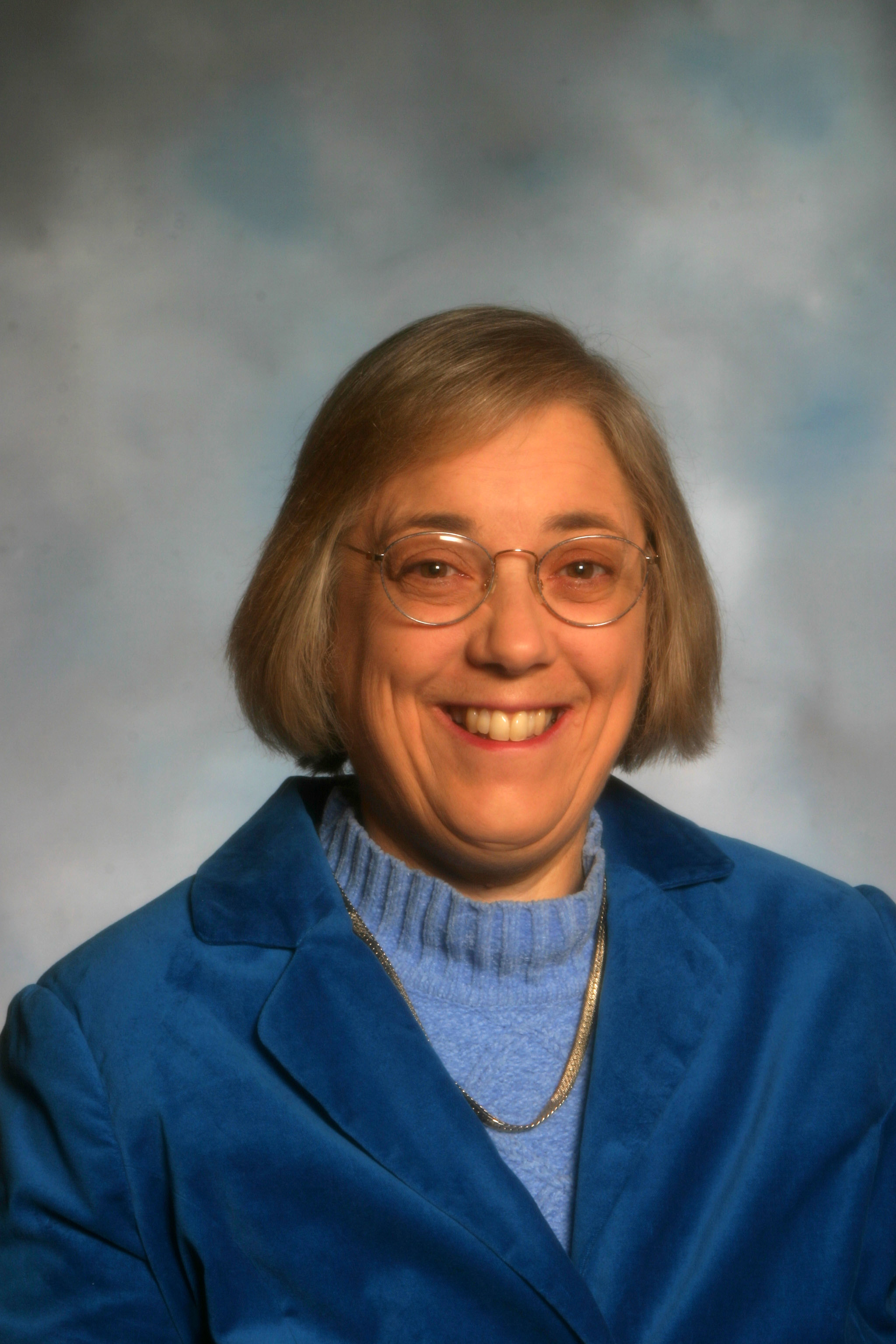

Member of the Iowa Senate from the 45th district
- In office January 8, 2007 – January 10, 2011
- Preceded by: David Miller
- Succeeded by: Sandy Greiner

Personal details
- Party: Democrat

Becky Schmitz is an Iowa politician. She was the Iowa State Senator from the 45th District, serving from 2007 till 2011. She was elected to the Jefferson County Board of Supervisors in November 2012. She assumed office January 1, 2013 for a 4-year term.

Schmitz served on several committees in the Iowa Senate - the Economic Growth committee; the Education committee; the Government Oversight committee; the State Government committee; the Ways and Means committee; and the Human Resources committee, where she was vice chair.

Schmitz was elected in 2006 with 10,326 votes (50%), defeating Republican opponent David Miller.

Iowa Senate
Preceded by David Miller	45th District; 2007 – 2011	Succeeded by Sandy Greiner
