= Senator Shull =

Senator Shull may refer to:

- Doug Shull (born 1943), Iowa State Senate
- Joseph Horace Shull (1848–1944), Pennsylvania State Senate
