= Chuck Larson =

American politician (born 1968)

Charles W. Larson Jr.
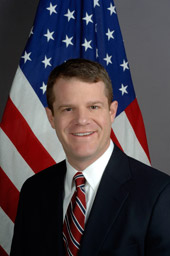

United States Ambassador to Latvia
- In office February 12, 2008 – January 20, 2009
- President: George W. Bush
- Preceded by: Catherine Todd Bailey
- Succeeded by: Judith G. Garber

Member of the Iowa Senate from the 19th district
- In office January 13, 2003 – January 8, 2007
- Preceded by: Sheldon L. Rittmer
- Succeeded by: Rob Hogg

Member of the Iowa House of Representatives from the 55th district
- In office January 1993 – January 2003
- Preceded by: Mark Shearer
- Succeeded by: Clarence Hoffman

Personal details
- Born: Newton, Iowa, U.S.
- Party: Republican
- Children: 2
- Education: University of Iowa (BA); University of Iowa College of Law (JD)
- Occupation: Attorney
- Website: Larson's website

Charles W. 'Chuck' Larson Jr. (born April 1, 1968, in Newton, Iowa) is the former Ambassador Extraordinary and Plenipotentiary of the US to the Republic of Latvia. Prior to his appointment, Ambassador Larson was the Iowa State Senator from the 19th District from 2003 to 2007, was a member of the Iowa House of Representatives from 1993 to 2001, and is a former chairman of the Republican Party of Iowa. He was succeeded in the Iowa Senate by Democrat Rob Hogg.

During his most recent term of office, Larson served on several committees in the Iowa Senate – the Commerce committee; the Education committee; the Judiciary committee; the Ways and Means committee; and the Ethics committee, where he was co-chair. In 2003, President George W. Bush appointed Larson to the President's Advisory Commission for Drug Free Communities, on which he continues to serve.

On November 30, 2007, the White House announced that Larson would be nominated to become Ambassador Extraordinary and Plenipotentiary of the US to the Republic of Latvia in 2008, replacing Catherine Todd Bailey.

In May 2008, Latvian President Valdis Zatlers awarded Ambassador Larson the Order of the Three Stars, which is Latvia's highest award for his service to the country.

In June 2009, President Barack Obama announced he was nominating Judith Gail Garber to replace Larson as U.S. Ambassador to Latvia.

== Work ==
Chuck served on the Pearl Mutual Fund board of directors from 2006 until his appointment. He prosecuted as an assistant county attorney in Jones County, Iowa from 1997 to 1999. He was then named General Counsel for the ESCO Group, a Marion, Iowa, technology services firm with more than 250 employees. He served in this capacity until 2006. He was also chairman of the Republican Party of Iowa from 2001 to 2005 and served on U.S. Senator John McCain's presidential Kitchen Cabinet.

Ambassador Larson is one of the founding partners of Larson Shannahan and Slifka group (LS2group), a bipartisan public affairs firm in Des Moines, IA, whose projects range from local to international covering a diverse groups of sectors.

== Education ==
Ambassador Larson is a 1992 graduate of the University of Iowa, where he received his Bachelor of Arts degree in economics. He graduated with honors and distinction and is a member of the Phi Beta Kappa honor society. In 1996, Ambassador Larson received his Juris Doctor degree with distinction from the University College of Law.

== Military service ==
Ambassador Larson served as a major in the U.S. Army Reserves spending a year in Iraq during Operation Iraqi Freedom and was awarded a Bronze Star Medal for meritorious service in combat and the Combat Action Badge.

In January 2008, Ambassador Larson's book Heroes Among Us, was released by Penguin Publishing, profiling 29 heroes from the War on Terrorism.

Iowa Senate
Preceded by Sheldon Rittmer	19th District; 2003–2003	Succeeded by Rob Hogg
Diplomatic posts
Preceded by Catherine T. Bailey	United States Ambassador to Latvia; 2008–2009	Succeeded by Judith G. Garber
