= Senator Iverson =

Senator Iverson may refer to:

- Alfred Iverson Sr. (1798–1873), U.S. Senator from Georgia
- Stewart Iverson (born 1950), Iowa State Senate
