= Hubert Houser =

American politician

Hubert M. Houser
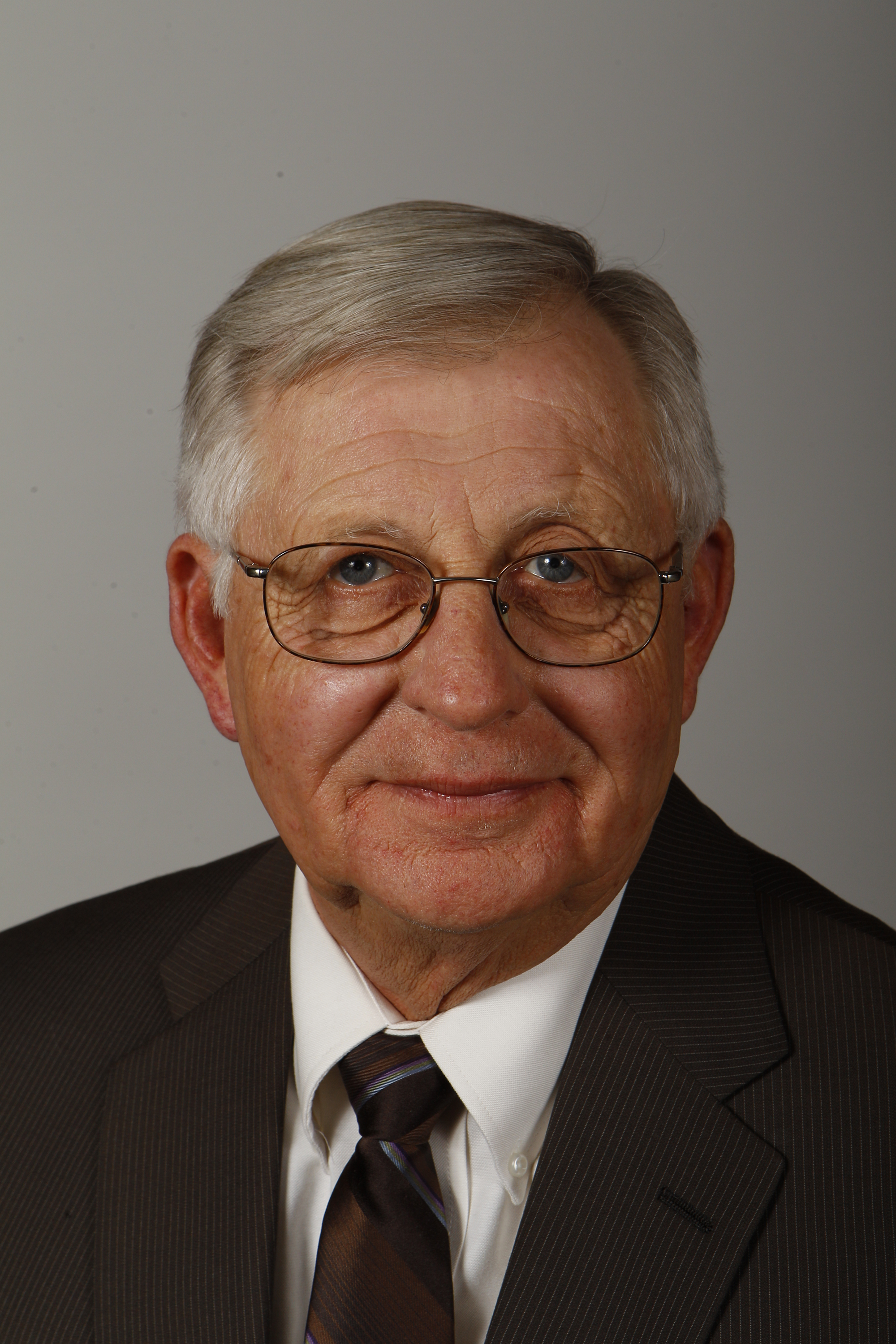

Member of the Iowa Senate from the 49th district 43rd (2002–2003)
- In office 2002–2013
- Preceded by: Derryl McLaren
- Succeeded by: Rita Hart

Personal details
- Born: October 9, 1942 (age 83) Pottawattamie County, Iowa, U.S.
- Party: Republican
- Spouse: Paula Ackerman
- Occupation: Farmer
- Website: Houser's website

Hubert M. Houser (born October 9, 1942) was the Iowa State Senator from the 49th District. He served in the Iowa Senate from 2002, when he filled a vacancy left by Derryl McLaren's resignation, until 2013.

Houser served on several committees in the Iowa Senate - the Agriculture committee; the Local Government committee; the Transportation committee; the Ways and Means committee; and the Economic Growth committee, where he is the ranking member. He also serves on the Agriculture and Natural Resources Appropriations Subcommittee. His prior political experience includes serving as a representative in the Iowa House from 1992 to 2001, serving on the Pottawattamie County Board of Supervisors from 1979 to 1993, and serving two terms on the Carson-Macedonia School Board.

Houser was re-elected in 2006 with 14,373 votes, running unopposed.

== Education ==
Houser obtained his degree from Iowa State University.

== Career ==
Outside politics Houser is a farmer. Secretary of the Senate Michael Marshall told The Des Moines Register on Monday (April 7) that Sen. Hubert Houser was receiving his $144 daily expense payments and his $25,000 annual salary, though he hasn't voted on a measure since March 4. Houser told the Register earlier he was too busy with work on his farm to join in legislative business, adding that as a Republican in the Democratic-controlled Senate, he had little to do. On Monday, Houser told the Council Bluffs Daily Nonpareil he's willing to return his legislative pay to the state if anyone requested he do so. Houser, a Republican, has served 22 years in the Legislature.

== Organizations ==
- Farm bureau
- Cattleman's Association

== Elected offices ==
- Carson-Macedonia School Board (two years)
- Pottawattamie County Board of Supervisors (1979-1993)
- Economic Development Authority Board
- Iowa Economic Development Board
- Iowa Power Fund Board

Iowa Senate
Preceded by Derryl McLaren	43rd District; 2002 – 2003	Succeeded by Joe Seng
Preceded by Mark Shearer	49th District; 2003 – 2013	Succeeded by Rita Hart
