= Chaz Allen =

American politician

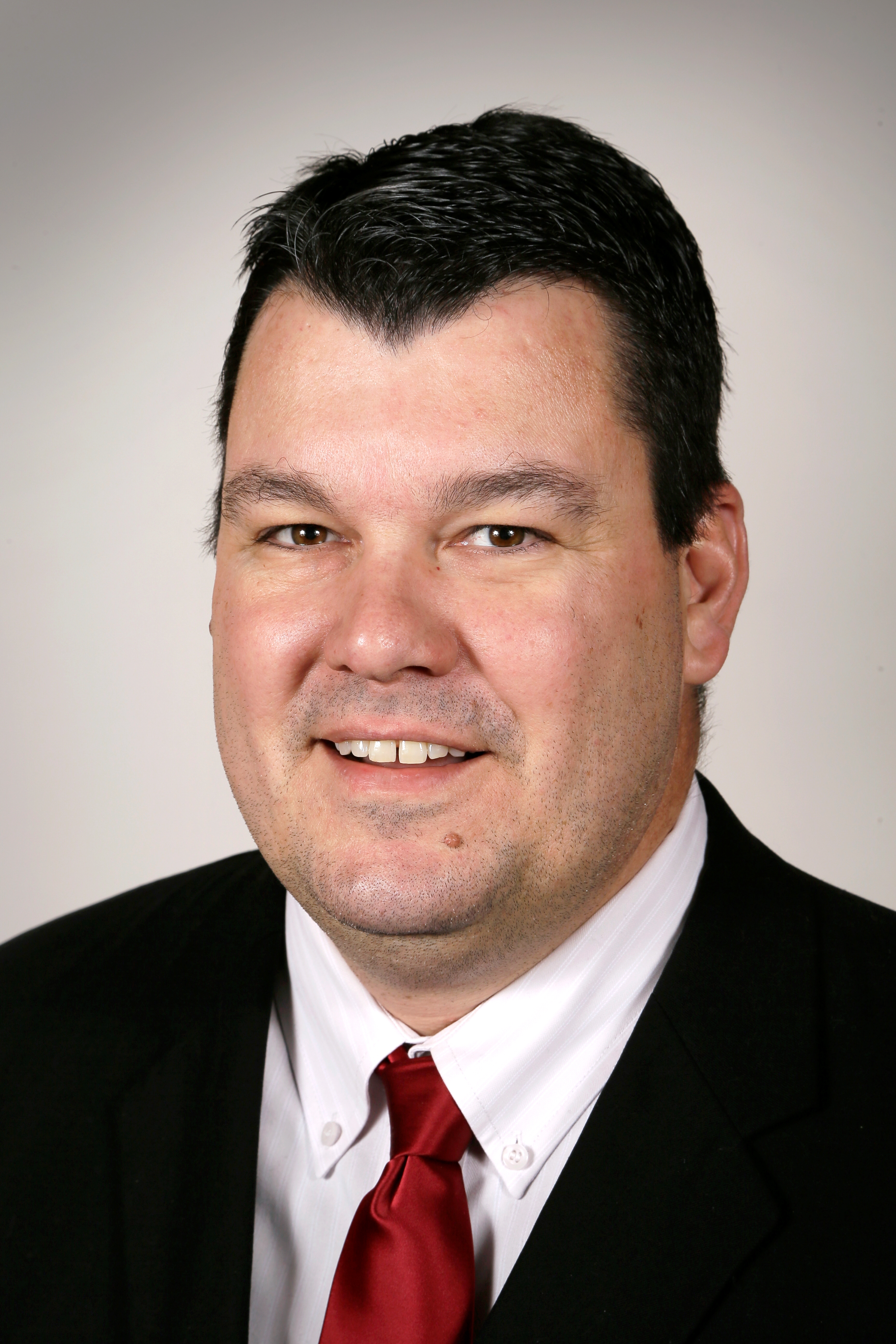
- Preceded by: Dennis Black

Personal details
- Spouse: Teri

Chaz Allen is the former mayor of Newton, Iowa between 2004 and 2012. Allen stated in July 2018 that he would not run for election and that he was resigning from public office.

== Electoral history ==
Iowa Senate 15th District election, 2014
Party	Candidate	Votes	%
Democratic	Chaz Allen	13,307	52.6%
Republican	Crystal Bruntz	12,008	47.4%
Democratic hold			
