= Iowa's 21st Senate district =

American legislative district

Iowa's 10th State Senate district
Senator
Mike Bousselot; R

The 21st District of the Iowa Senate is located in central Iowa, United States, and is currently composed of part of Polk County.

== Current elected officials ==
Mike Bousselot is the senator currently representing the 21st District.

The area of the 21st District contains two Iowa House of Representatives districts:

- The 41st District (represented by Ryan Weldon)
- The 42nd District (represented by Heather Matson)

The district is also located in Iowa's 3rd congressional district, which is represented by Zach Nunn.

== Past senators ==
The district has previously been represented by:

- Charles Balloun, 1971–1973
- Patrick Deluhery, 1983–1992
- Maggie Tinsman, 1993–2002
- Dennis Black, 2003–2012
- Matt McCoy, 2013–2018
- Claire Celsi, 2019–present

== Historical district boundaries ==
Map	Description	Years effective	Notes
	Jackson County	1852–1855	From 1846 to 1857, district numbering was not utilized by the Iowa State Legislature. This convention was added with the passing of the 1857 Iowa Constitution. Numbering of districts pre-1857 is done as a matter of historic convenience.
	Scott County	1856–1859	
	Clinton County	1860–1863	
	Warren County	1864–1877	
	Scott County	1878–1962	
	Johnson County	1963–1966	
	Audubon County Dallas County; Guthrie County	1967–1970	
	Benton County Black Hawk County (partial); Tama County	1971–1972	
	Polk County (partial) Story County (partial)	1973–1982	

== Recent election results from statewide races ==
Year	Office	Results
2008	President	McCain 51–47%
2012	President	Romney 54–46%
2016	President	Trump 48–43%
2016	Senate	Grassley 62–34%
2018	Governor	Hubbell 49.4–48.7%
2018	Attorney General	Miller 75–25%
2018	Secretary of State	Pate 51–47%
2018	Treasurer	Fitzgerald 58–39%
2018	Auditor	Sand 51–47%
2020	President	Biden 49.1–48.6%
2020	Senate	Ernst 49–48%
2022	Senate	Grassley 50.2–49.7%
2022	Governor	Reynolds 52–46%
2022	Attorney General	Miller 55–45%
2022	Secretary of State	Pate 56–44%
2022	Treasurer	Fitzgerald 56–44%
2022	Auditor	Sand 57–43%
2024	President	Trump 50–48%

== See also ==
- Iowa General Assembly
- Iowa Senate
