= Bob Brunkhorst =

American politician in the state of Iowa

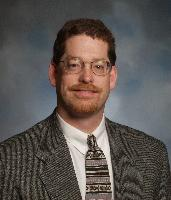
- Robert J. Brunkhorst

Member of the Iowa House of Representatives
- In office 1992–2002

Member of the Iowa State Senate
- In office 2002–2005

Personal details
- Born: December 5, 1965 (age 60) Waverly, Iowa, United States
- Party: Republican
- Spouse: Kris Brunkhorst
- Children: Karalynn Brunkhorst Zachary Brunkhorst
- Occupation: Computer analyst

Robert John Brunkhorst (born December 5, 1965) is an American politician in the state of Iowa.

He was born in Waverly, Iowa. He attended Loras College and is a computer analyst. He served in the Iowa House of Representatives from 1992 to 2002, and the Iowa State Senate from 2002 to 2005. From 2009 to 2013, he served as mayor of Waverly, Iowa.
