= Iowa's 31st Senate district =

American legislative district

Senate District 31
- Type: District of the Upper House
- Location: Northeast Iowa
- Senator: William Dotzler (D)
- Parent organization: Iowa General Assembly

The 31st District of the Iowa Senate is located in northeast Iowa, and is currently composed of part of Black Hawk County.

== Current elected officials ==
William Dotzler is the senator currently representing the 31st District.

The area of the 31st District contains two Iowa House of Representatives districts:

- The 61st District (represented by Timi Brown-Powers)
- The 62nd District (represented by Ras Smith)

The district is also located in Iowa's 1st congressional district, which is represented by Ashley Hinson.

== Past senators ==
The district has previously been represented by:

- Lowell Junkins, 1983–1985
- Gene Fraise, 1986–1992
- Ralph Rosenberg, 1993–1994
- Johnie Hammond, 1995–2002
- Matt McCoy, 2003–2012
- William Dotzler, 2013–present

== See also ==
- Iowa General Assembly
- Iowa Senate
