= Iowa's 49th Senate district =

American legislative district

Senate District 49
- Type: District of the Upper House
- Location: Eastern Iowa
- Senator: Cindy Winckler (D)
- Parent organization: Iowa General Assembly

The 49th District of the Iowa Senate is located in eastern Iowa, and is currently composed of part of Scott County.

== Current elected officials ==
Cindy Winckler is the senator currently representing the 49th District.

The area of the 49th District contains two Iowa House of Representatives districts:

- The 97th District (represented by Ken Croken)
- The 98th District (represented by Monica Kurth)

The district is also located in Iowa's 1st congressional district, which is represented by Mariannette Miller-Meeks.

== Past senators ==
The district has previously been represented by:

- Jack Hester, 1983–1992
- Tom Vilsack, 1993–1998
- Mark Shearer, 1999–2002
- Hubert Houser, 2003–2012
- Rita Hart, 2013–2018
- Chris Cournoyer, 2019–2023
- Cindy Winckler, 2023–present

== Recent election results from statewide races ==
Year	Office	Results
2008	President	Obama 64–34%
2012	President	Obama 68–32%
2016	President	Clinton 55–37%
2016	Senate	Judge 49–46%
2018	Governor	Hubbell 60–38%
2018	Attorney General	Miller 77–23%
2018	Secretary of State	DeJear 60–37%
2018	Treasurer	Fitzgerald 63–34%
2018	Auditor	Sand 63–34%
2020	President	Biden 58–40%
2020	Senate	Greenfield 58–38%
2022	Senate	Franken 56–44%
2022	Governor	DeJear 52–46%
2022	Attorney General	Miller 57–42%
2022	Secretary of State	Miller 54–45%
2022	Treasurer	Fitzgerald 56–44%
2022	Auditor	Sand 58–42%
2024	President	Harris 53–45%
