= Catherine Todd Bailey =

American ambassador

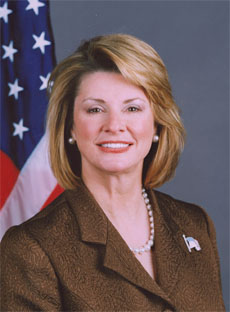

American Ambassador to Latvia
- In office February 4, 2005 – February 4, 2008
- President: George W. Bush

Personal details
- Born: 1951 (age 74–75) Indiana, U.S.

Catherine Todd Bailey (born 1951) is an American diplomat who served as Ambassador of the United States of America to Latvia (Appointed, 29 November 2004 Left post on 4 February 2008). Bailey was awarded the Honor of the Order of the Three Stars by the president of Latvia, the highest honor given to an individual for outstanding public service.

Bailey is the Chair of the Department of Transportation Advisory Committee on Human Trafficking for the United States Chamber of Commerce. She was a Republican National Committee member from Kentucky between 2000 and 2004.

== Early life and education ==
Bailey was born in Indiana in 1951. She received a bachelor's degree from Franklin College.

== Career ==
Early in her career, Bailey worked for eight years as an elementary school teacher, served as public relations consultant for Creative Alliance and as a consultant for the American Bar Association. In 1984, she co-founded the Louisville chapter of Ronald McDonald House, a charitable organization that provides housing and support for families of critically and terminally ill children. From 2000 to 2004, Bailey served as Republican National Committee member from Kentucky.

On September 8, 2004, President George W. Bush announced his intent to nominate Bailey to become the United States Ambassador to Latvia. On November 21, 2004, her nomination was confirmed in the Senate by voice vote and was sworn in as ambassador by former U.S. Secretary of State Colin Powell on January 13, 2005.</ref name=":0"/>

== Personal ==
In 2000, Bailey, and her husband Irving W. Bailey II, founded Operation Open Arms, Inc., a private child placing agency in Kentucky that places children of incarcerated mothers into foster families. Bailey has received accolades for her work with Operation Open Arms, including receipt of the 2003 Unsung Heroine Award sponsored by Mitsubishi Motors.

Bailey has served as a volunteer board member for numerous organizations, including: the Kentucky Opera, the Kentucky Arts and Crafts Foundation, McConnell Center for Political Leadership & Excellence, University of Louisville and the Kennedy Center. />
