= Doug Shull =

American politician

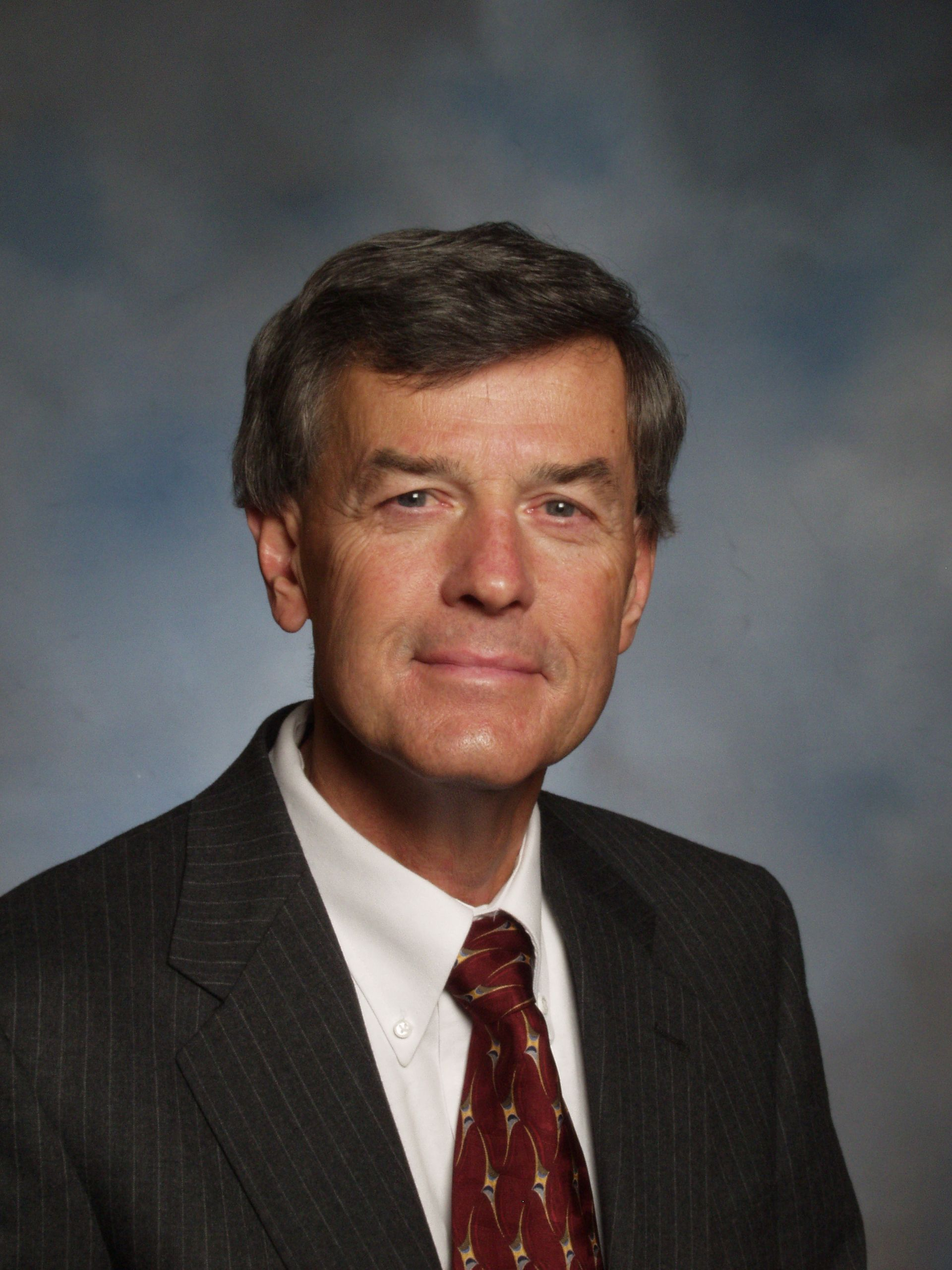

Member of the Iowa State Senate
- In office January 13, 2003 – January 7, 2007

Member of the Iowa State House of Representatives
- In office January 8, 1979 – January 9, 1983

Personal details
- Born: January 14, 1943 (age 83) Sac City, Iowa, United States
- Party: Republican
- Spouse: Carol Madison
- Children: 2
- Occupation: Certified Public Accountant

Douglas K. Shull (born January 14, 1943) is an American politician in the state of Iowa. He is a legacy at Simpson College and has been a mentor for Simpson Alumni from Earlham, Iowa.

Shull was born in Sac City, Iowa and attended the University of Iowa. A Republican, he served in the Iowa House of Representatives from 1979 to 1983 (92nd district) and the Iowa Senate from 2003 to 2007 (37th district).
