= Matt McCoy (politician) =

American politician (born 1966)

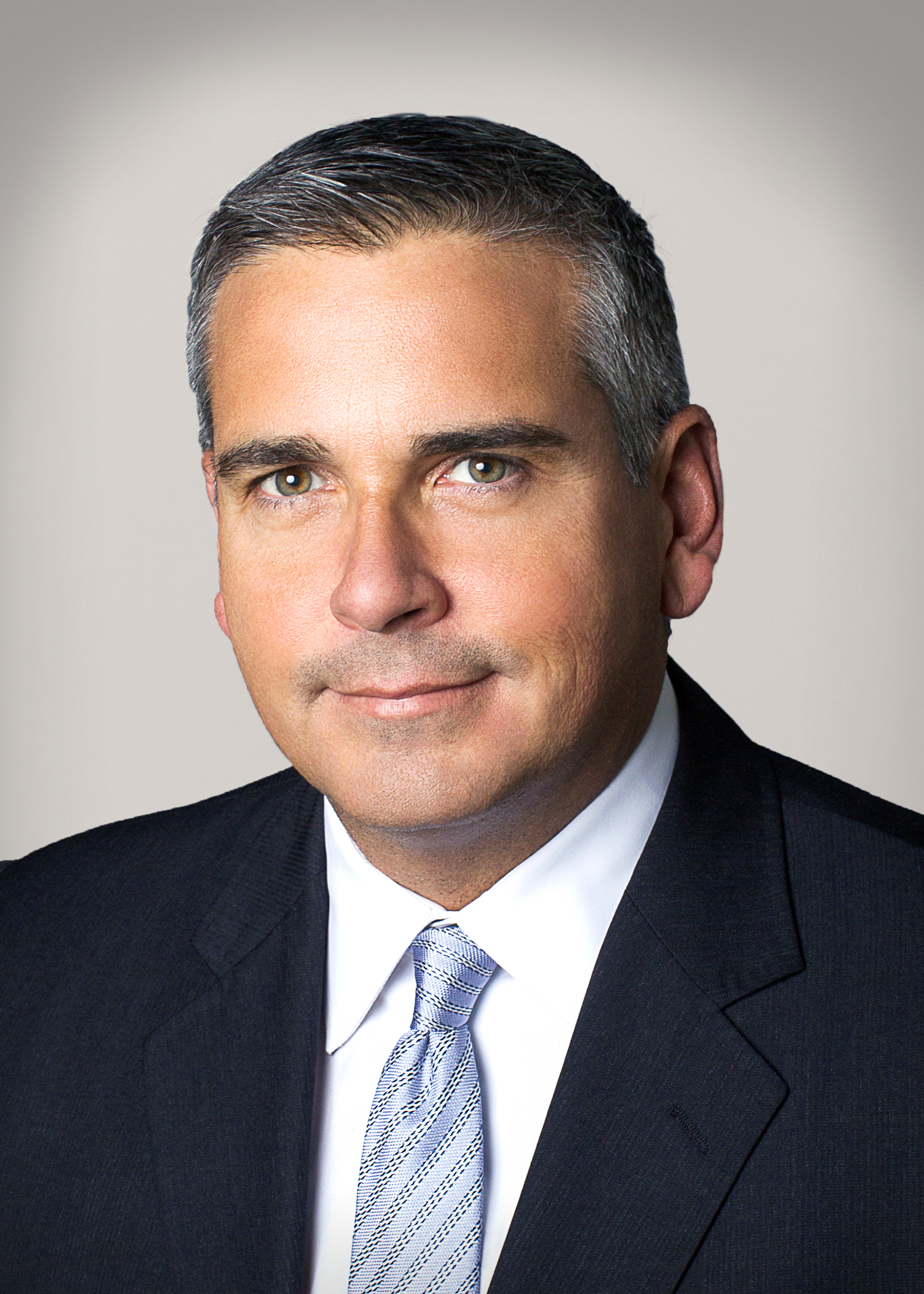
- McCoy in 2015

Member of the Polk County Board of Supervisors from the 5th district
- Incumbent
- Assumed office January 2, 2019
- Preceded by: John Mauro

Member of the Iowa Senate from the 21st district
- In office January 2, 2003 – January 2, 2019
- Preceded by: Johnie Hammond
- Succeeded by: Claire Celsi

Member of the Iowa Senate from the 34th district
- In office January 13, 1997 – January 2, 2003
- Preceded by: Tony Bisignano
- Succeeded by: Dick Dearden

Member of the Iowa House of Representatives from the 67th district
- In office January 11, 1993 – January 13, 1997
- Preceded by: Joel W. Brown
- Succeeded by: Frank Chiodo

Personal details
- Born: March 29, 1966 (age 60) Des Moines, Iowa, U.S.
- Party: Iowa Democratic Party
- Children: 1
- Education: Briar Cliff College
- Website: Supervisor McCoy

Matthew W. "Matt" McCoy (born March 29, 1966) is a member of the Board of Supervisors of Polk County, Iowa, representing the fifth district. A member of the Iowa Democratic Party, McCoy served in the Iowa Senate from 1997 to 2019 and the Iowa House of Representatives from 1993 to 1997. McCoy was the first openly gay member of the Iowa General Assembly.

== Biography ==
McCoy graduated from Dowling Catholic High School, in West Des Moines, Iowa, and received his B.A. from Briar Cliff College in political science. In 2016, McCoy completed Harvard University's John F. Kennedy School of Government program for Senior Executives in State and Local Government as a David Bohnett LGBTQ Victory Institute Leadership Fellow.

== Iowa House and Senate ==
McCoy was elected to the Iowa House of Representatives in 1992 from the 67th district. In 1996, he was elected to the Iowa Senate from the 34th District. While in the Iowa Senate, McCoy served on several committees, including commerce, local government, transportation, and appropriations.

McCoy was re-elected in 2006 with 13,276 votes (66%), defeating Republican opponent Nicholas G. van Patten, and again in 2010.

On January 31, 2018, McCoy announced he would not seek reelection to the Iowa State Senate and instead would run for Polk County Supervisor from District Five, a seat held by Democrat John Mauro for the previous 16 years. McCoy defeated Mauro in the Democratic primary in June 2018 and won the general election in November 2018.

== Personal life ==
McCoy has one son, Jack, and worships at Plymouth Congregational Church.

Iowa House of Representatives
Preceded by	67th District; 1993–1997	Succeeded by Frank Chiodo
Iowa Senate
Preceded by Tony Bisignano	34th District; 1997–2003	Succeeded by Dick Dearden
Preceded by Johnie Hammond	21st District; 2003–2019	Succeeded by Claire Celsi
