= Rod Halvorson =

American politician

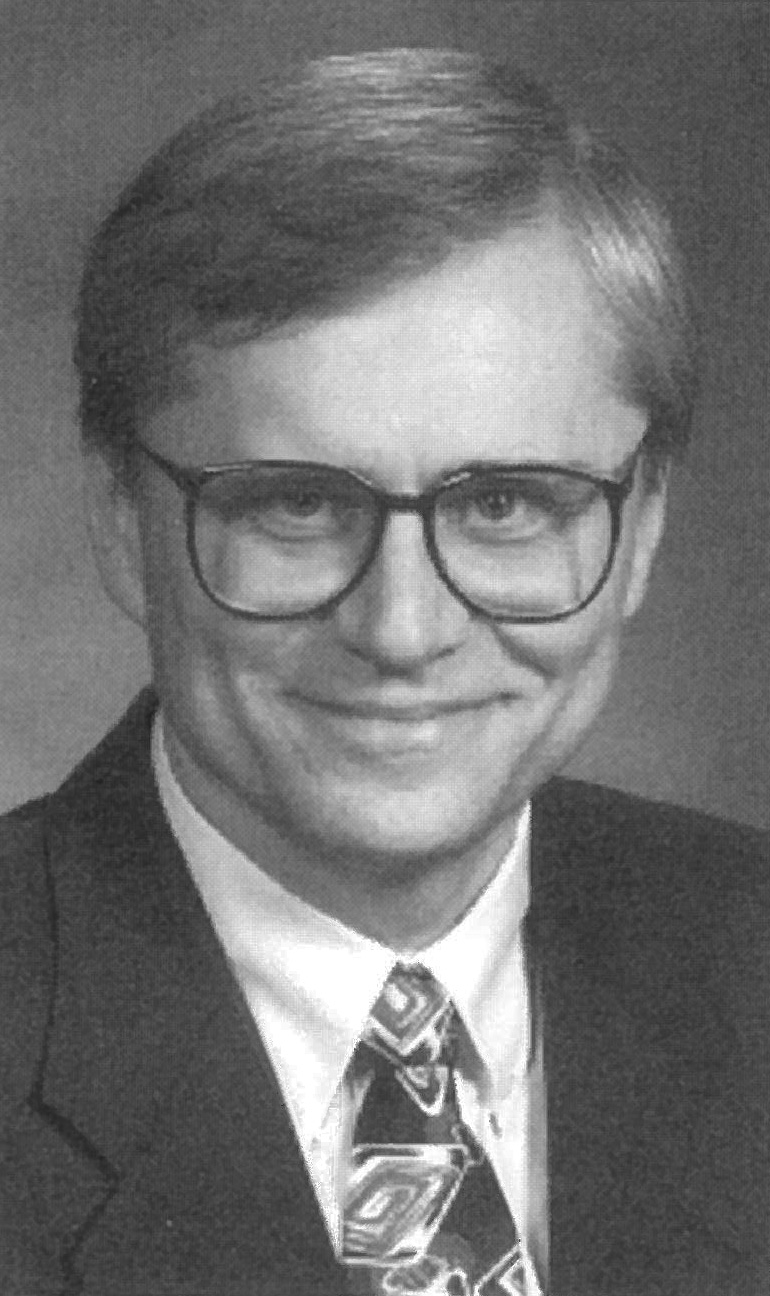

Member of the Iowa Senate from the 7th district
- In office January 9, 1995 – January 10, 1999
- Preceded by: James B. Kersten
- Succeeded by: Michael Sexton

Member of the Iowa House of Representatives from the 13th district 46th (1979-83)
- In office January 8, 1979 – January 8, 1995
- Preceded by: Jerome Fitzgerald
- Succeeded by: Michael G. Cormack

Personal details
- Born: December 23, 1949 (age 76) Appleton, Minnesota
- Party: Democratic
- Education: Moorhead State University
- Occupation: Association Management & Real Estate Agent
- Profession: Political & Community Activist
- Website: Halvorson's legislative website

Rodney N. Halvorson (born December 23, 1949) is an Iowa state legislator and political activist in Iowa and his home state of Minnesota. Halvorson was born and raised in Appleton, Minnesota. A Democrat, he served Webster and Calhoun county in the Iowa Senate from 1995 to 1999, representing the 7th District. From 1979 to 1995, he served Fort Dodge and Webster county in the Iowa House of Representatives, representing the 46th and 13th Districts.

== Biography ==
Halvorson was born and raised in Appleton, Minnesota. After high school, he was a public administration intern at the University of Minnesota and received a bachelor's degree in business administration from Moorhead State University in 1971. Halvorson pursued graduate studies in community and regional planning North Dakota State University and in public administration at Drake University.

From 1972 to 1978, Halvorson worked for Iowa Congressman Berkley Bedell, serving as a campaign organizer and congressional district manager. From 1979 to 1995, he served as a state representative, and as a state senator from 1995 to 1999. During this time, Halvorson served as a member of the Iowa Democratic State Central committee, from 1978 to 1982, 1992–94 and 2000 and as an assistant House majority leader for the 70th-72nd General Assemblies.

In November 2000, Halvorson moved back to his home state of Minnesota to accept a position as the executive director and chief lobbyist for the Minnesota Social Service Association (MSSA) in Saint Paul. He retired from this position in February 2013.

Halvorson continued to be a community and political activist in his new hometown and was named "a prominent St. Paul political activist" by the St. Paul Pioneer Press. He served as the DFL party chair in Senate Districts 66 and 65 as well as the DFL Ramsey County Chair for eight years, ending in 2012. In 2015 and 2016 Halvorson became actively involved in the Senator Bernie Sanders campaign for president and was elected as a Minnesota DFL national delegate to the Democratic National Convention and elected to serve as the Minnesota DFL delegation co-chair for Sanders. Halvorson continued his support for Sanders as an active member of the Sanders inspired Our Revolution Minnesota, serving on the board of directors and chair of the board in 2019. Halvorson was again elected as a Sanders nation delegate to the 2020 Democratic National Convention.

In 2014, Halvorson attempted a political comeback by returning to Fort Dodge and running for the Webster County Board of Supervisors in District 4. Halvorson was defeated by the incumbent.

Iowa House of Representatives
Preceded by Jerome Fitzgerald	46th District; January 8, 1979 – January 9, 1983	Succeeded by Jean Hall Lloyd-Jones
Preceded by Rollin K. Howell	13th District; January 10, 1983 – January 8, 1995	Succeeded by Michael G. Cormack
Iowa Senate
Preceded by James B. Kersten	7th District; January 9, 1995 – January 10, 1999	Succeeded by Michael Sexton
