= Bill Fink =

Former Iowa state senator

William Fink
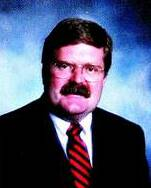

Member of the Iowa Senate from the 45th district
- In office January 11, 1993 – January 12, 2003
- Preceded by: James Riordan
- Succeeded by: David Miller

Personal details
- Born: May 5, 1955 (age 71) Ringsted, Iowa
- Party: Democratic
- Spouse: Donna
- Education: Iowa State University

William Fink (born May 5, 1955) is a former Iowa state senator. He also taught social studies for 36 years at Carlisle High School before retiring in 2015.

Fink grew up in Ringsted, Iowa, and graduated from high school there in 1973. He then spent four years in Ames, Iowa, attending Iowa State University, graduating in 1977 with a B.S. in political science while also earning a teaching certificate. Following college, he became an intern within the Iowa Senate and began teaching social studies. He later earned an M.S.E. in education from Drake University in 1984.

In 1982, he ran for the Iowa House as a Democrat, but was unsuccessful. He tried again in 1988, but did not succeed then either. In 1992, he attempted to enter the Iowa Senate instead of the House. This time, he won both the primary and the general election, and proceeded to spend the next 10 years as a state senator with the Democratic Party. Among his accomplishments within the senate was the establishment of wind generators as a major source of electrical power within the state. In 2001, he criticized an attempt by the Iowa legislature to make Iowa the first state in the country to base its salaries for public school teachers on their performances in the classroom, calling it "...tragic and misdirected" and saying he felt teachers themselves had been allowed too little input.

Following his career as senator, Fink returned to teaching at the high school level, where he remained for the next three decades.

Fink is a Lutheran.
