= Nancy Boettger =

American politician (born 1943)

Nancy Jane Boettger
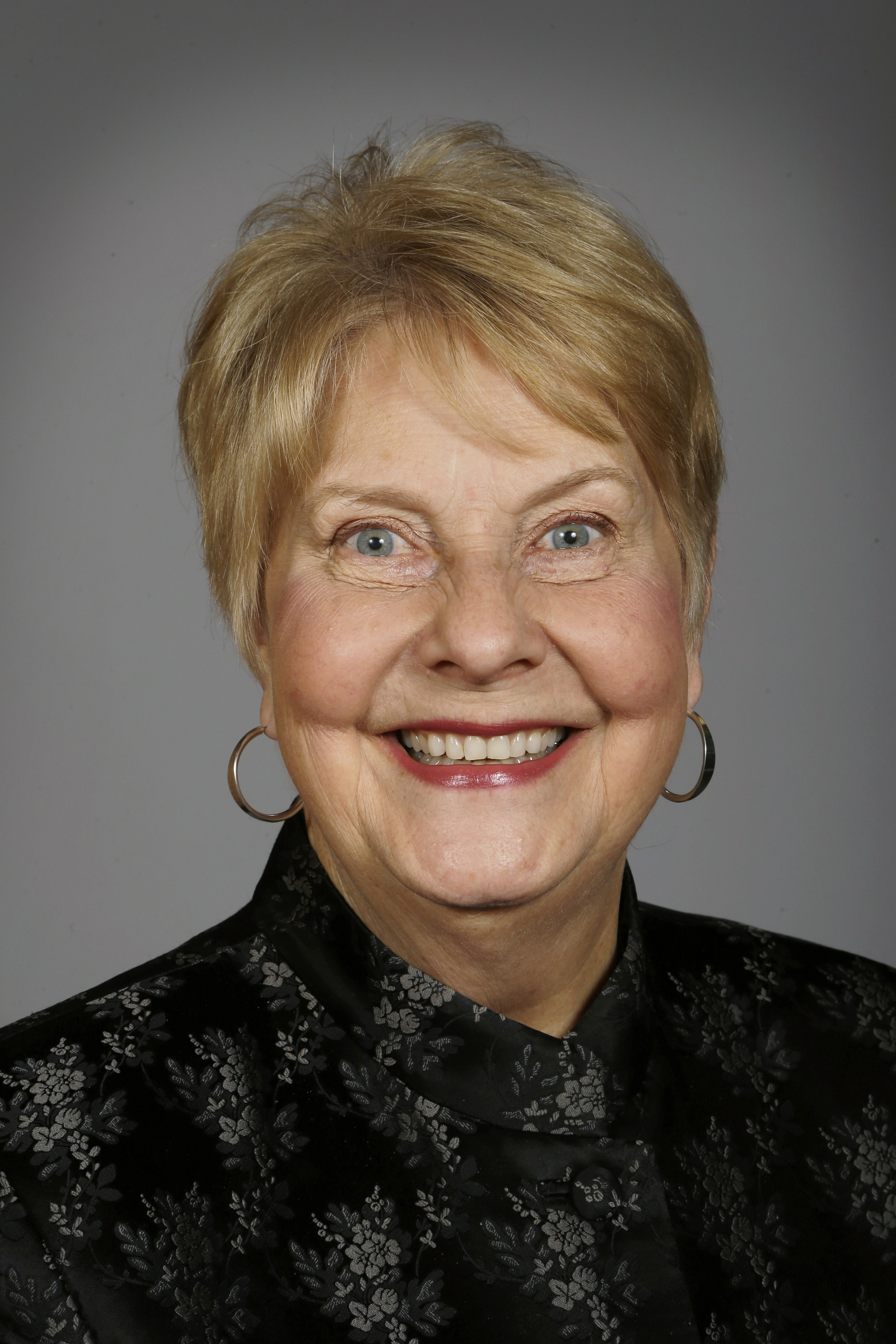

Member of the Iowa Senate from the 9th district 41st (1995–2003), 29th (2003–2013)
- In office January 9, 1995 – January 11, 2015
- Preceded by: David Millage

Personal details
- Born: May 1, 1943 (age 83) Chicago, Illinois
- Party: Republican
- Spouse: H. David Boettger
- Education: Buena Vista College (B.A.); Iowa State University (B.A.)
- Occupation: Farmer, Former Educator
- Website: Boettger's website

Nancy Jane Boettger (born May 1, 1943) was the Iowa State Senator from the 9th District. A Republican, she served in the Iowa Senate since 1995. She received a B.A. in Sociology from Iowa State University in 1965 and a B.A. from Buena Vista College in Education in 1982.

Boettger served on several committees in the Iowa Senate: the Agriculture committee; the Appropriations committee; the Human Resources committee; the Judiciary committee; the Rules and Administration committee; and the Education committee, where she was the ranking member. She also served as the ranking member of the Education Appropriations Subcommittee.

Boettger was re-elected in 2006 with 14,474 votes, running unopposed. She left office in 2015.

After Regent Nancy Boettger warned Iowa State University in July 2022 to keep free speech in mind while teaching the “politically charged topic” of climate science, she gave ISU a pair of books from the Nongovernmental International Panel on Climate Change — which denies the notion of human-induced climate change.

Boettger was appointed to the Board of Regents, State of Iowa on March 1, 2017, by Governor Terry Branstad. Her term expires April 30, 2023.

Iowa Senate
| Preceded by David Millage | 41st District; 1995 – 2003 | Succeeded by Maggie Tinsman |
| Preceded by Dennis Black | 29th District; 2003 – 2013 | Succeeded by Tod Bowman |
| Preceded by Bill Dix | 9th District; 2013 – 2015 | Succeeded by Jason Schultz |
