= Betty Soukup =

American politician (born 1947)

Betty A. Soukup (born February 3, 1947) is an American politician.

Soukup was born in Clarksburg, West Virginia, on February 3, 1947. After graduating from Tripoli High School in 1965, she earned an associate's degree in business management from Northeast Iowa Community College in 1991, followed by a bachelor's degree in communications at Wartburg College two years later. Soukup is married to Robert, with whom she raised three children.

Soukup was a Democratic member of the Iowa Senate from January 11, 1999, to January 12, 2003, representing District 15. Prior to serving on the state senate, she was a city councilor.
