= Joe Bolkcom =

American politician

Joseph Bolkcom
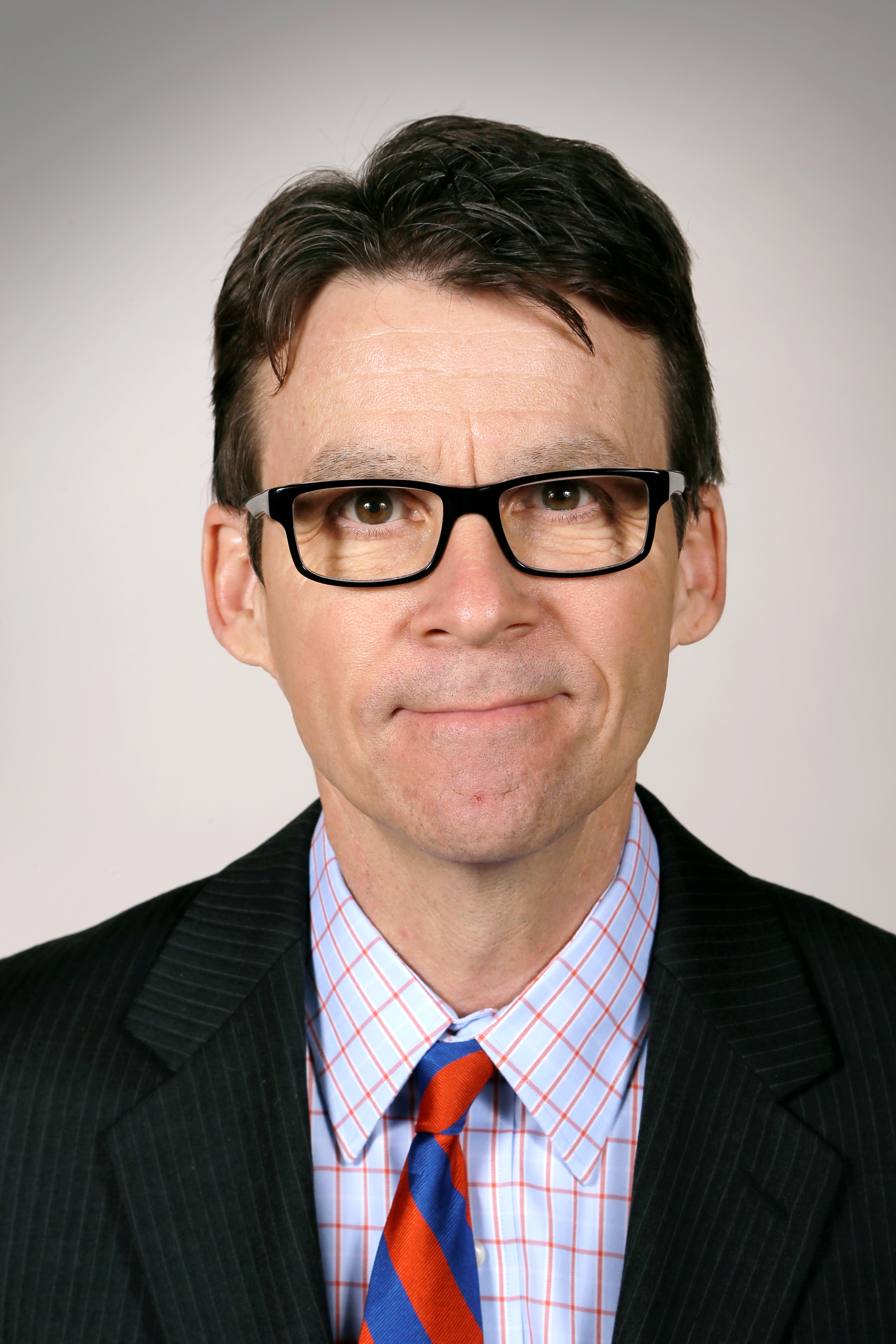

Member of the Iowa Senate from the 43rd district 23rd (1999–2003), 39th (2003–2012)
- In office January 11, 1999 – January 2, 2023
- Preceded by: Mary Neuhauser
- Succeeded by: Zach Wahls

Personal details
- Born: July 29, 1956 (age 69) Bloomington, Minnesota, U.S.
- Party: Democratic
- Website: Bolkcom's website

Joseph Bolkcom (born July 29, 1956) is a former member of the Iowa Senate. A Democrat, he was first elected to the Senate in 1998 and served for 24 years before retiring in 2023. During his tenure he represented the 23rd, 39th and 43rd District of the General Assembly, which includes most of metropolitan Iowa City.

Bolkcom graduated from Saint Ambrose University in Davenport in 1985. He went on to earn a master's degree in Public Affairs from the University of Iowa. He served from 1993 to 1998 on the Johnson County Board of Supervisors. Prior to that he worked for Johnson County Health Department, Senior Advocates, Inc., and Senior Education, Inc. He is a member of the Iowa Chapter of the Sierra Club.

Iowa Senate
Preceded by Mary Neuhauser	23rd District; 1999 – 2003	Succeeded by Herman Quirmbach
Preceded by David Lord	39th District; 2003 – 2012	Succeeded by Sandy Greiner
Preceded by Joe Seng	43rd District; 2012 – 2022	Succeeded by Zach Wahls
