= Dennis Black =

American politician

Dennis H. Black
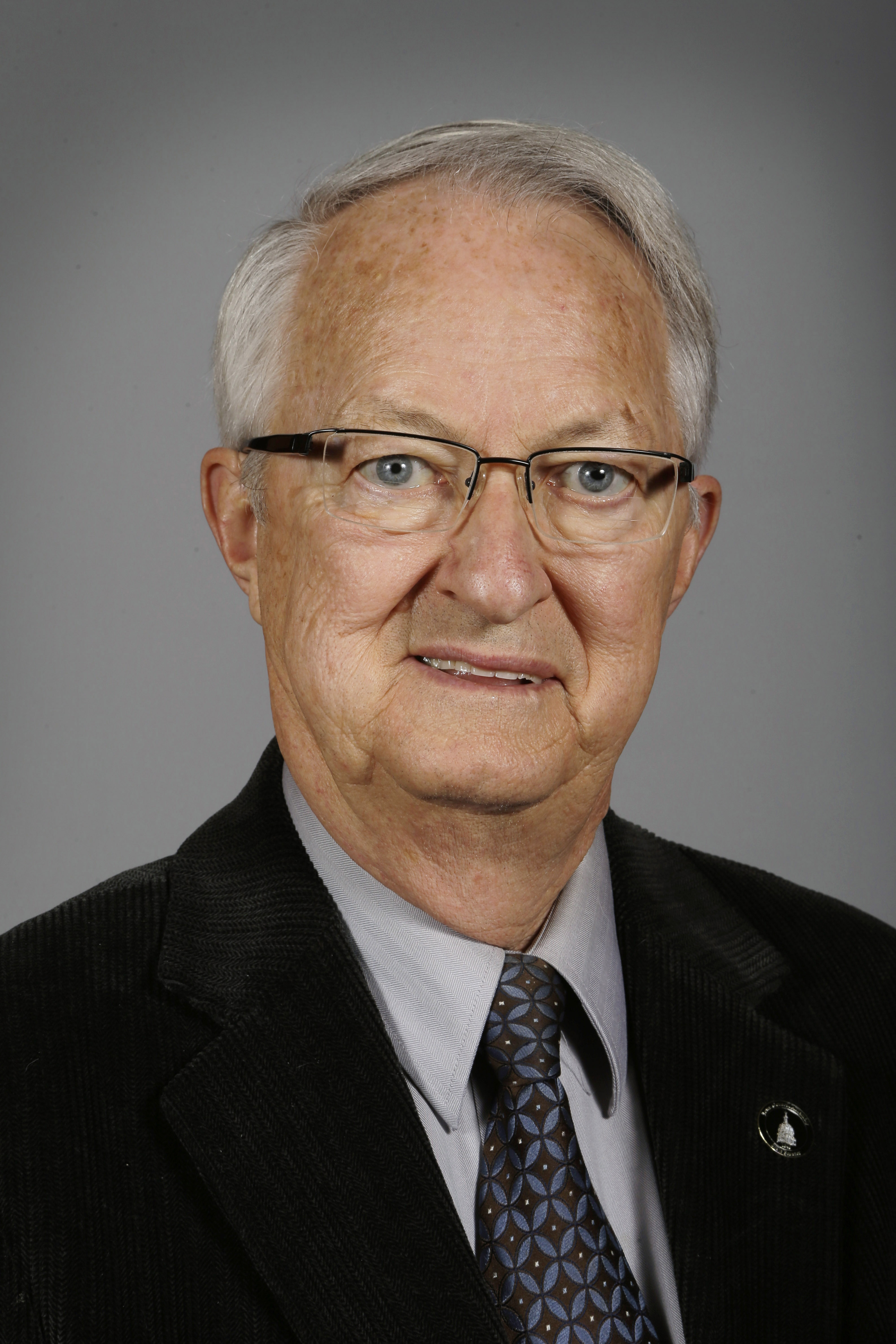

Member of the Iowa Senate from the 15th district 29th (1995–2003)
- In office January 9, 1995 – January 11, 2015
- Preceded by: William Dialeman
- Succeeded by: Chaz Allen

Member of the Iowa House of Representatives from the 58th district 71st (1983–1993)
- In office 1983 – January 9, 1995
- Preceded by: Janet Carl
- Succeeded by: Danny Carroll

Personal details
- Born: December 18, 1939 (age 86) Randolph, Nebraska
- Party: Democratic
- Spouse: Faun Stewart
- Children: 3 children
- Education: Utah State University
- Occupation: Conservationist

Dennis H. Black (born December 18, 1939) is a former Democratic politician, from Lynnville Iowa. Black holds a bachelor's degree in forest management and a master's degree in natural resource economics from Utah State University. He was an author of The Resource Enhancement and Protection (REAP) Fund while chairing the House Natural Resources Committee in Iowa's 73rd General Assembly.

Black's career includes work as a natural resource analyst and consultant, service as the director of the Jasper County Conservation Board from 1970 to 2005, and the author of numerous natural resource management publications. His civic involvement includes service on the Newton Community Schools Board of Education, Jasper County Soil and Water District Commission, Des Moines River Greenbelt Commission, the Iowa Capitol Planning Commission, Jasper Community Foundation, and Terrace Hill Commission. He has also chaired the Jasper County Economic Development Commission.

Iowa House of Representatives
Preceded by Janet Carl	71st District; 1983 – 1993	Succeeded by Tom Baker
Preceded by Steven Grubbs	58th District; 1993 – 1995	Succeeded by Danny Carroll
Iowa Senate
Preceded by William Dialeman	29th District; 1995 – 2003	Succeeded by Nancy Boettger
Preceded by Patrick Deluhery	21st District; 2003 – 2012	Succeeded by Matt McCoy
Preceded by Robert Dvorsky	15th District; 2012 – 2015	Succeeded by Chaz Allen
