= Mary Lou Freeman =

American politician (1941–2006)

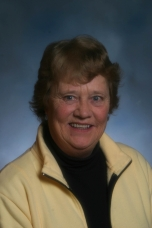

Member of the Iowa House of Representatives from the 52nd district
- In office 2003–2006

Member of the Iowa State Senate from the 5th district
- In office 1995–2003

Personal details
- Born: Mary Lou Hawkinson; October 21, 1941 Kandiyohi, Minnesota, U.S.
- Died: September 4, 2006 (aged 64) Alta, Iowa, U.S.
- Party: Republican
- Spouse: Dennis Freeman (m. 1962)
- Children: 4
- Education: Gustavus Adolphus College (BA)
- Occupation: Politician

Mary Lou Freeman (née Hawkinson; October 21, 1941 – September 4, 2006) was an American politician who served as a member of the Iowa House of Representatives and the Iowa State Senate.

== Early life and career ==
Born in Kandiyohi, Minnesota, Freeman, a Republican, was elected twice to the Iowa State Senate from the 5th District serving from 1995 to 2003, and was then elected to two terms in the Iowa State House from the 52nd district, serving from 2003 until her death in 2006.

== Education ==
Freeman graduated from Willmar High School and later obtained her Bachelor of Arts degree in elementary education from Gustavus Adolphus College.

== Personal life and death ==
=== Family ===
She married Dennis Freeman on June 10, 1962. Freeman was the daughter of J. Martin Hawkinson and Luella Hawkinson. She had 4 children and 10 grandchildren. Freeman died at her home in Alta, Iowa on September 4, 2006.

== Organizations ==
Freeman was a member of the following organizations:

- Early Childhood Intervention Council; 1994
- State Board of Health; 1986–1994
- Maternal/Child Health Advisory Council; 1988–1994
- Medical Assistance Advisory Council; 1983–1985
- St. Mark Lutheran Church, Storm Lake

Iowa House of Representatives
Preceded by Patrick Shey	52nd District; 2003–2007	Succeeded by Gary Worthan
