= Sheldon L. Rittmer =

American politician

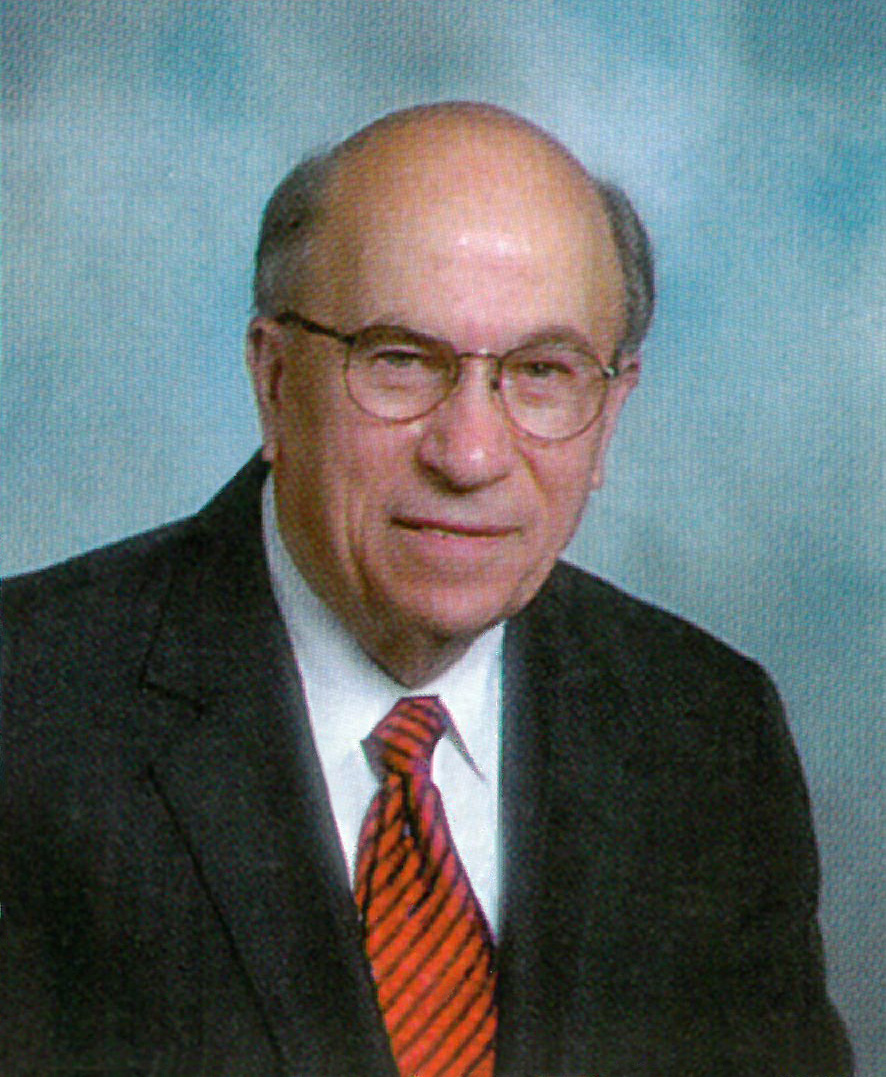

Member of the Iowa Senate from the 19th district
- In office January 14, 1991 – January 12, 2003
- Preceded by: Norman Goodwin
- Succeeded by: Chuck Larson

Personal details
- Born: Sheldon Lowell Rittmer; September 5, 1928 Clinton County, Iowa, U.S
- Died: November 21, 2015 (aged 87) Bettendorf, Iowa, U.S.
- Party: Republican
- Occupation: farmer

Sheldon Lowell Rittmer (September 5, 1928 – November 21, 2015) was an American politician in the state of Iowa.

Rittmer was born in Clinton County, Iowa. He is a farmer. He served in the Iowa State Senate from 1991 to 2003, as a Republican. He died in 2015 in Bettendorf, Iowa from a Zenker's diverticulum.
