= Mary Neuhauser =

American lawyer and politician (born 1934)

Mary Cameron Neuhauser
- Born: August 27, 1934 (age 91); New York City, U.S.
- Occupations: Lawyer, Politician

Mary Cameron Neuhauser (born August 27, 1934) is an American lawyer and former politician.

== Life and career ==
Born in New York City, Neuhauser received her bachelor's degree from Radcliffe College and her law degree from University of Iowa College of Law. She practiced law in Iowa City, Iowa, served on the Iowa City Council, and was the mayor of the city. Neuhauser was initially a Republican but became a Democrat because of the Watergate Scandal. As a Democrat, Neuhauser served in the Iowa House of Representatives from 1987 to 1995 and then in the Iowa Senate from 1995 to 1999.

== See also ==
- List of mayors of Iowa City
