= Derryl McLaren =

American politician (born 1949)

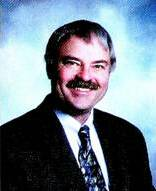

Member of the Iowa State Senate
- In office January 14, 1991 – May 17, 2001

Personal details
- Born: March 22, 1949 (age 77) Shenandoah, Iowa, U.S.
- Party: Republican
- Spouse: Carma Herrig
- Occupation: Farmer

Derryl J. McLaren (born March 22, 1949) is an American politician in the state of Iowa.

McLaren was born in Shenandoah, Iowa. He attended Iowa State University and is a farmer. He served Iowa Senate from 1991 to 2001, as a Republican (47th district from 1991 to 1993 and 43rd district from 1993 to 2001).
