= Stewart Iverson =

American politician (born 1950)

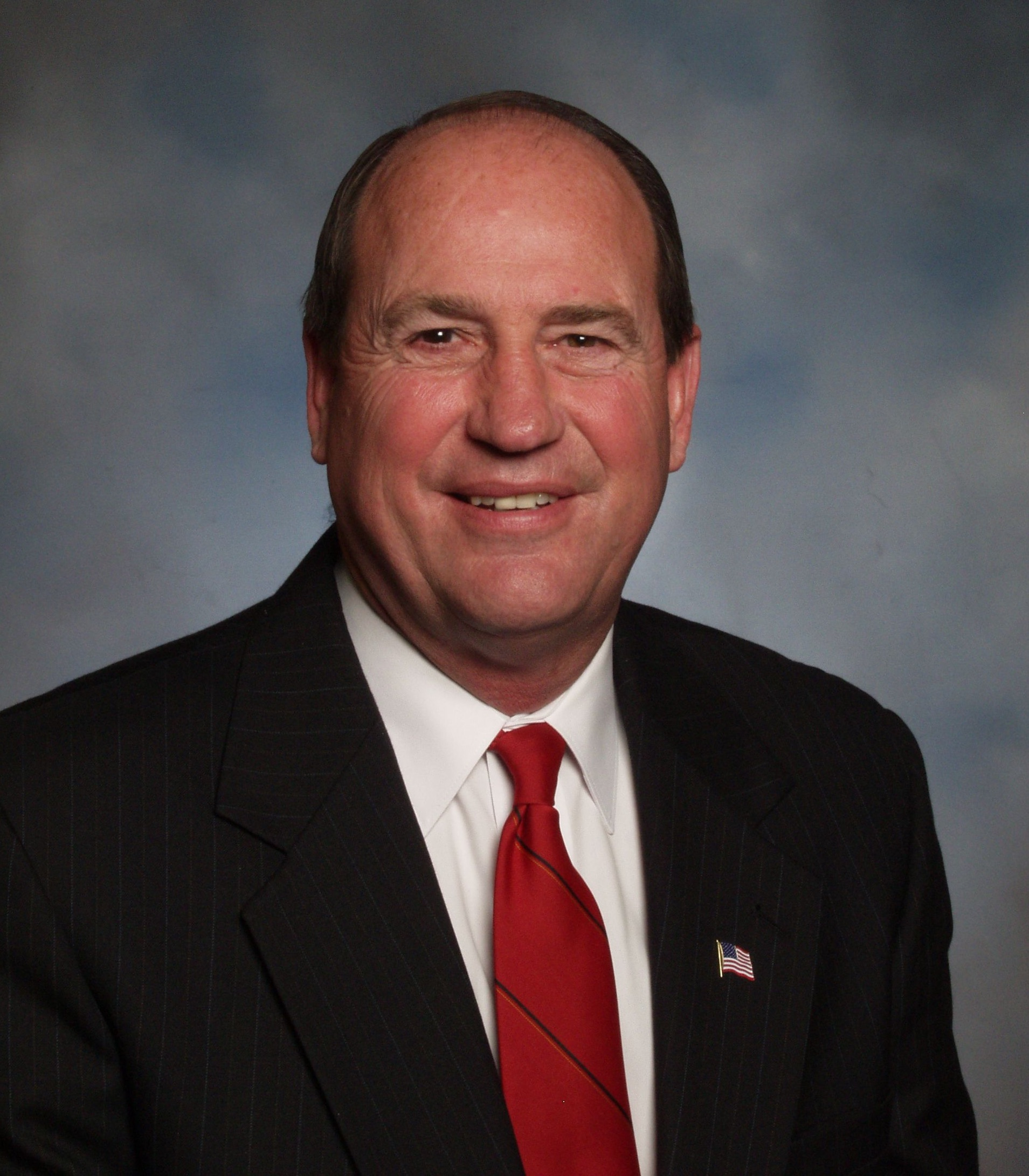

Member of the Iowa State Senate
- In office January 9, 1999 – January 7, 2007

Member of the Iowa House of Representatives
- In office January 10, 2011 – January 13, 2013
- In office January 9, 1989 – January 8, 1995

Personal details
- Born: July 16, 1950 (age 76) Dows, Iowa, U.S.
- Party: Republican
- Spouse: Vicky
- Children: 2
- Education: Ellsworth Community College; Buena Vista College
- Occupation: Farmer

Stewart E. Iverson Jr. (born July 16, 1950) is a former Republican Party member of the Iowa House of Representatives. He previously served in the Iowa State Senate from the 5th District, where he was majority leader from 1998 until 2006.

Iverson holds a degree in accounting from Buena Vista College. He was first elected to the Iowa State house in 1990, serving two terms there.

In 1994 he was elected to the Iowa State Senate. He did not run for reelection in 2006.

He was again elected to the state house in 2010.
