= David Miller (Iowa politician) =

American politician

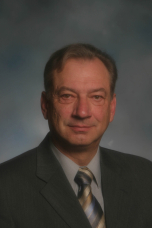
David Miller's official portrait as part of the 81st Iowa General Assembly

David P. Miller (born November 24, 1946) was an American farmer, lawyer, and politician.

Born in Batavia, Jefferson County, Iowa, Miller served in the United States Army. He graduated from the University of Denver in 1969 and from the University of Iowa College of Law in 1973. He practiced law in Fairfield, Iowa. Miller was also a farmer and the owner of the Batavia Grain, Inc. Miller was also involved with the Republican Party. From 1999 to 2007, Miller served in the Iowa State Senate.
