= Maggie Tinsman =

American politician

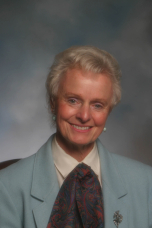

Member of the Iowa Senate from the 41st district: 21st district (1993–2003); 20th district (1989–1993)
- In office 1989–2007

Member of the Scott County Board of Supervisors
- In office 1978–1988

Personal details
- Born: July 14, 1936 (age 90) Moline, Illinois, US
- Party: Republican
- Education: University of Colorado Boulder (BA); University of Iowa (MSW)

Maggie Tinsman (born July 14, 1936) is an American politician who served as a Republican member of the Iowa State Senate from 1989 to 2007.

Tinsman received a Bachelor of Arts in 1958 from the University of Colorado Boulder and a Master of Social Work in 1974 from the University of Iowa. Before her election to the state senate she served for 10 years as a Scott County Supervisor.

Tinsman ran for the Republican nomination for the 1996 U.S. Senate election, finishing 2nd in the primary behind Congressman Jim Ross Lightfoot.

After leaving office, she has run a lobbying group involved in issues related to early childhood education.

== Sources ==
- Biography from Tinsman's website
- Page on Tinsman from Iowa State Senate website
- Iowa legislature bio of Tinsman
