= Johnie Hammond =

American politician (born 1932)

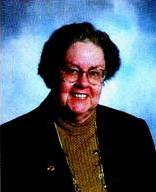

Member of the Iowa Senate
- In office January 9, 1995 – January 12, 2003

Member of the Iowa House of Representatives
- In office January 10, 1983 – January 8, 1995

Personal details
- Born: August 22, 1932 (age 93) Eupora, Mississippi, U.S.
- Party: Democratic
- Spouse: Earl Hammond
- Children: 4
- Education: University of Minnesota; Iowa State University

Johnie Wright Hammond (born August 22, 1932) is an American politician in the state of Iowa.

Hammond was born in Eupora, Mississippi. She attended University of Texas, University of Minnesota, and Iowa State University. A Democrat, she served in the Iowa House of Representatives from 1983 to 1995 (74th district) and the Iowa Senate from 1995 to 2003. She is the first woman in Story County, Iowa to hold office on the county board of supervisors, first woman to represent Ames in the House of Representatives and in the Senate. Reference: Ames Tribune. (31st district).
