= Mark Shearer =

American politician

Mark S. Shearer
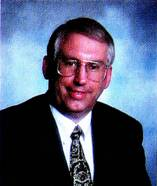

Member of the Iowa Senate from the 49th district
- In office January 11, 1999 – January 12, 2003
- Preceded by: Tom Vilsack

Member of the Iowa State House of Representatives from the 55th district
- In office January 9, 1989 – January 10, 1993

Personal details
- Born: August 11, 1952 (age 73) Burlington, Iowa, U.S.
- Party: Democratic
- Education: University of Iowa (BA)

Mark S. Shearer (born August 11, 1952) is an American politician who served as a member of both chambers of the Iowa General Assembly

== Early life and education ==
Born in Burlington, Iowa, Shearer was raised in Washington, Iowa and attended the University of Iowa, majoring in journalism, business marketing and music performance.

== Career ==
Shearer began his career as a broadcast journalist and on-air talent in several Iowa media markets. While a student at the University of Iowa, he was appointed manager for the university's student radio station KICR / KRUI, and served on the board of directors for the Iowa Broadcast News Association. Shearer was editor of The Columbus Gazette in Louisa County, Iowa for 20 years. Appointed by Gov. Terry Branstad as a member of the Iowa Arts Council Board of Directors in the 1980s, he chaired the council from 1985 to 1988.

Shearer represented the 55th district in Southeast Iowa in the Iowa House of Representatives from 1989 to 1993, and the 49th district in the Iowa Senate from 1999 to 2003. He joined the Iowa Department of Agriculture and Land Stewardship in 2004 as director of emergency programs. In his current position at the Iowa Department of Homeland Security and Emergency Management, he served for eight years as national coordinator of the Multi-State Partnership for Security in Agriculture.
