= Iowa General Assembly =

Legislative branch of the state government of Iowa

Coordinates: 41.591°N 93.604°W

- Great Seal of the State of Iowa

Type
- Type: Bicameral
- Houses: Senate; House of Representatives

Leadership
- Senate President: Amy Sinclair (R) since January 9, 2023
- House Speaker: Pat Grassley (R) since January 13, 2020

Structure
- Seats: 150 members; 50 senators; 100 representatives
- Senate political groups: Republican (33); Democratic (17)
- House of Representatives political groups: Republican (67); Democratic (33)

Elections
- Last Senate election: November 5, 2024 (25 seats)
- Last House of Representatives election: November 5, 2024
- Next Senate election: November 3, 2026 (25 seats)
- Next House of Representatives election: November 3, 2026

Meeting place
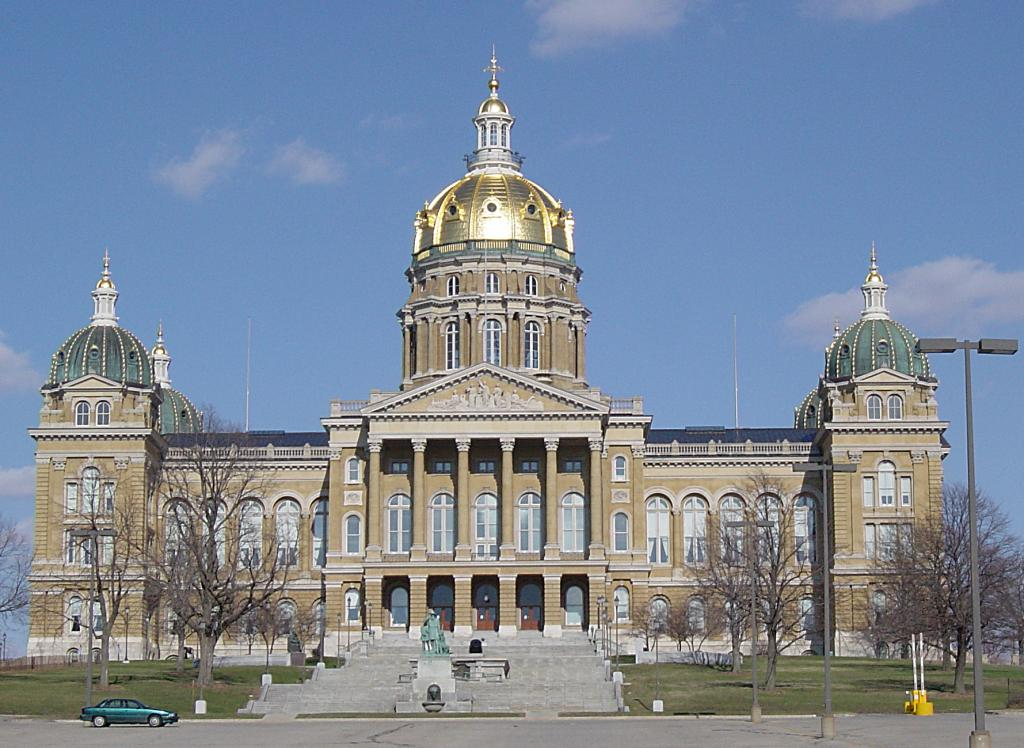
- Iowa State Capitol; Des Moines

Website
- Iowa General Assembly

The Iowa General Assembly is the legislative branch of the state government of Iowa. Like the federal United States Congress, the General Assembly is a bicameral body, composed of the upper house Iowa Senate and the lower Iowa House of Representatives respectively. The Senate consists of four year terms and the House consists of two year terms. The General Assembly convenes within the Iowa State Capitol in Des Moines since the capital was moved there in 1857. The assembly convenes annually on the second Monday in January.

== Composition ==
The Iowa General Assembly consists of 50 senators and 100 representatives. Each senator represents about 63,848 people and each representative about 31,924 people as of the 2020 United States census. The current legislative maps were enacted on November 4, 2021 for the 2022 elections and the 90th General Assembly.

Officials in the Senate are President Amy Sinclair (R) and President Pro Tempore Ken Rozenboom (R). Partisan Senate leaders include Majority Leader Mike Klimesh (R) and Democratic Leader Janice Weiner (D). In the House, the Speaker is Pat Grassley (R) and the Speaker Pro Tempore is John Wills (R). Partisan House leadership includes Majority Leader Bobby Kaufmann (R), and Minority Leader Brian Meyer (D). The Republican Party held a 2/3rds super-majority in the Senate until the August 2025 special election.

=== Composition of the 91st General Assembly of Iowa (2025–2026) ===
Affiliation (Senate)	Members
Republican Party	33
Democratic Party	17
Independent	0
Vacant	0
Total	50

Affiliation (House)	Members
Republican Party	67
Democratic Party	33
Independent	0
Vacant	0
Total	100

== See also ==
- Iowa Senate
- Iowa House of Representatives
- Governor of Iowa
- List of Iowa General Assemblies
