= 2010 Iowa Senate election =

Iowa State Senate elections, 2010
- November 2, 2010

25 out of 50 seats in the Iowa State Senate 26 seats needed for a majority
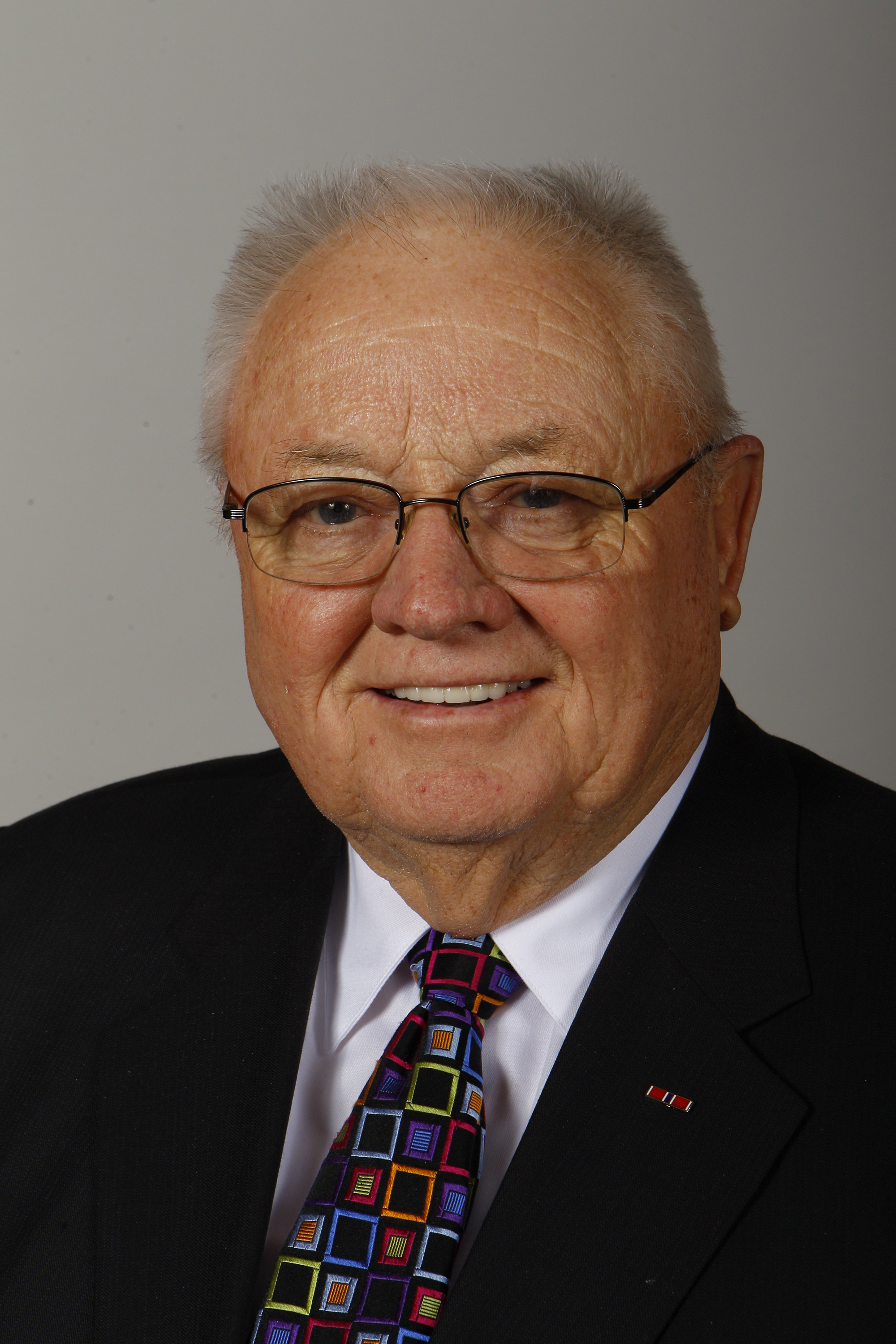

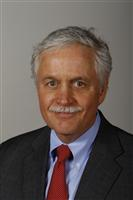
	Majority party	Minority party
Leader	Jack Kibbie	Paul McKinley
Party	Democratic	Republican
Leader's seat	4th	36th
Last election	32	18
Seats before	32	18
Seats after	26	24
Seat change	▼6	▲6
- Results of the elections: Republican gain Democratic hold Republican hold No election
President of the Senate before election
Jack Kibbie
Democratic
Elected President of the Senate
Jack Kibbie
Democratic

The 2010 Iowa State Senate elections took place as part of the biennial 2010 United States elections. Iowa voters elected state senators in half of the state senate's districts—the 25 odd-numbered state senate districts. State senators serve four-year terms in the Iowa State Senate, with half of the seats up for election each cycle.

The primary election on June 8, 2010, determined which candidates appeared on the November 2, 2010 general election ballot. Primary election results can be obtained here.

Following the previous 2008 Iowa Senate election, Democrats maintained control of the Iowa state Senate with 32 seats.

To reclaim control of the chamber from Democrats, the Republicans needed to net 8 Senate seats.

Democrats maintained control of the Iowa State Senate following the 2010 general election; however, their majority was significantly reduced from 32 to 26 seats. Republicans saw their numbers soar from 18 to 24 seats.

== Predictions ==
Source	Ranking	As of
Governing	Lean D	November 1, 2010

== Summary of Results ==
- NOTE: Only odd-numbered Iowa Senate seats were up for election in 2010, so even-numbered seats are not included here.

State Senate District	Incumbent	Party	Elected Senator	Party
1st	Steve Warnstadt	Dem	Rick Bertrand	Republican
3rd	David Johnson	Rep	David Johnson	Republican
5th	Rich Olive	Dem	Robert Bacon	Republican
7th	Amanda Ragan	Dem	Amanda Ragan	Democratic
9th	Bill Heckroth	Dem	Bill Dix	Republican
11th	William Dotzler	Dem	William Dotzler	Democratic
13th	Roger Stewart	Dem	Tod Bowman	Democratic
15th	Robert Dvorsky	Dem	Robert Dvorsky	Democratic
17th	Wally Horn	Dem	Wally Horn	Democratic
19th	Rob Hogg	Dem	Rob Hogg	Democratic
21st	Dennis Black	Dem	Dennis Black	Democratic
23rd	Herman Quirmbach	Dem	Herman Quirmbach	Democratic
25th	Daryl Beall	Dem	Daryl Beall	Democratic
27th	Ron Wieck	Rep	Bill Anderson	Republican
29th	Nancy Boettger	Rep	Nancy Boettger	Republican
31st	Matt McCoy	Dem	Matt McCoy	Democratic
33rd	Jack Hatch	Dem	Jack Hatch	Democratic
35th	Larry L. Noble	Rep	Larry L. Noble	Republican
37th	Staci Appel	Dem	Kent Sorenson	Republican
39th	Joe Bolkcom	Dem	Joe Bolkcom	Democratic
41st	David Hartsuch	Rep	Roby Smith	Republican
43rd	Joe M. Seng	Dem	Joe M. Seng	Democratic
45th	Becky Schmitz	Dem	Sandy Greiner	Republican
47th	Keith A. Kreiman	Dem	Mark Chelgren	Republican
49th	Hubert Houser	Rep	Hubert Houser	Republican

== Detailed Results ==
- Reminder: Only odd-numbered Iowa Senate seats were up for election in 2010, so even-numbered seats are not included here.
- Note: If a district does not list a primary, then that district did not have a competitive primary (i.e., there may have only been one candidate file for that district).

=== District 1 ===
Iowa Senate, District 1 General Election, 2010
Party	Candidate	Votes	%
Republican	Rick Bertrand	7,581	50.7
Democratic	Rick Mullin	7,359	49.3
Total votes		14,940	100.0
Republican gain from Democratic			

=== District 3 ===
Iowa Senate, District 3 General Election, 2010
Party	Candidate	Votes	%
Republican	David Johnson (incumbent)	17,770	100.0
Total votes		17,770	100.0
Republican hold			

=== District 5 ===
Iowa Senate, District 5 General Election, 2010
Party	Candidate	Votes	%
Republican	Robert Bacon	12,368	54.1
Democratic	Rich Olive (incumbent)	10,510	45.9
Total votes		22,878	100.0
Republican gain from Democratic			

=== District 7 ===
Iowa Senate, District 7 General Election, 2010
Party	Candidate	Votes	%
Democratic	Amanda Ragan (incumbent)	12,908	60.4
Republican	James Mills	8,452	39.6
Total votes		21,360	100.0
Democratic hold			

=== District 9 ===
Iowa Senate, District 9 General Election, 2010
Party	Candidate	Votes	%
Republican	Bill Dix	13,189	57.9
Democratic	William M. Heckroth (incumbent)	9,605	42.1
Total votes		22,794	100.0
Republican gain from Democratic			

=== District 11 ===
Iowa Senate, District 11 General Election, 2010
Party	Candidate	Votes	%
Democratic	Bill Dotzler (incumbent)	10,459	63.1
Republican	Ron Welper	6,126	36.9
Total votes		16,585	100.0
Democratic hold			

=== District 13 ===
Iowa Senate, District 13 Democratic Primary, 2010
Party	Candidate	Votes	%
Democratic	Tod R. Bowman	1,573	60.8
Democratic	Brian S. Moore	729	28.2
Democratic	Ed O'Neill	232	9.0
Democratic	Paul J. Feller	54	2.1
Total votes		2,588	100.0

Iowa Senate, District 13 General Election, 2010
Party	Candidate	Votes	%
Democratic	Tod R. Bowman	10,017	50.2
Republican	Andrew Naeve	9,947	49.8
Total votes		19,964	100.0
Democratic hold			

=== District 15 ===
Iowa Senate, District 15 General Election, 2010
Party	Candidate	Votes	%
Democratic	Robert E. Dvorsky (incumbent)	17,964	74.7
Republican	Christopher Peters	6,092	25.3
Total votes		24,056	100.0
Democratic hold			

=== District 17 ===
Iowa Senate, District 17 General Election, 2010
Party	Candidate	Votes	%
Democratic	Wally E. Horn (incumbent)	13,842	100.0
Total votes		13,842	100.0
Democratic hold			

=== District 19 ===
Iowa Senate, District 19 General Election, 2010
Party	Candidate	Votes	%
Democratic	Robert M. Hogg (incumbent)	15,481	100.0
Total votes		15,481	100.0
Democratic hold			

=== District 21 ===
Iowa Senate, District 21 Republican Primary, 2010
Party	Candidate	Votes	%
Republican	Joe Pirillo	1,898	43.6
Republican	Wes Enos	1,497	34.4
Republican	Michael R. Adams, Jr.	960	22.0
Total votes		4,355	100.0

Iowa Senate, District 21 General Election, 2010
Party	Candidate	Votes	%
Democratic	Dennis H. Black (incumbent)	13,517	52.3
Republican	Joe Pirillo	12,321	47.7
Total votes		25,838	100.0
Democratic hold			

=== District 23 ===
Iowa Senate, District 23 General Election, 2010
Party	Candidate	Votes	%
Democratic	Herman C. Quirmbach (incumbent)	11,767	52.9
Republican	Timothy L. Gartin	10,488	47.1
Total votes		22,255	100.0
Democratic hold			

=== District 25 ===
Iowa Senate, District 25 Republican Primary, 2010
Party	Candidate	Votes	%
Republican	Chris McGonegle	2,429	70.3
Republican	Larry M. Aden	1,025	29.7
Total votes		3,454	100.0

Iowa Senate, District 25 General Election, 2010
Party	Candidate	Votes	%
Democratic	Daryl Beall (incumbent)	10,504	54.2
Republican	Chris McGonegle	8,861	45.8
Total votes		19,365	100.0
Democratic hold			

=== District 27 ===
Iowa Senate, District 27 General Election, 2010
Party	Candidate	Votes	%
Republican	Bill Anderson	12,867	62.4
Democratic	Marty Pottebaum	7,744	37.6
Total votes		20,611	100.0
Republican hold			

=== District 29 ===
Iowa Senate, District 29 General Election, 2010
Party	Candidate	Votes	%
Republican	Nancy Boettger (incumbent)	16,127	100.0
Total votes		16,127	100.0
Republican hold			

=== District 31 ===
Iowa Senate, District 31 General Election, 2010
Party	Candidate	Votes	%
Democratic	Matt McCoy (incumbent)	13,385	65.5
Republican	Dave Leach	7,064	34.5
Total votes		20,449	100.0
Democratic hold			

=== District 33 ===
Iowa Senate, District 33 General Election, 2010
Party	Candidate	Votes	%
Democratic	Jack Hatch (incumbent)	10,565	100.0
Total votes		10,565	100.0
Democratic hold			

=== District 35 ===
Iowa Senate, District 35 General Election, 2010
Party	Candidate	Votes	%
Republican	Larry Noble (incumbent)	27,563	100.0
Total votes		27,563	100.0
Republican hold			

=== District 37 ===
Iowa Senate, District 37 General Election, 2010
Party	Candidate	Votes	%
Republican	Kent Sorenson	16,748	59.0
Democratic	Staci Appel (incumbent)	11,646	41.0
Total votes		28,394	100.0
Republican gain from Democratic			

=== District 39 ===
Iowa Senate, District 39 General Election, 2010
Party	Candidate	Votes	%
Democratic	Joe Bolkcom (incumbent)	19,485	100.0
Total votes		19,485	100.0
Democratic hold			

=== District 41 ===
Iowa Senate, District 41 Republican Primary, 2010
Party	Candidate	Votes	%
Republican	Roby Smith	2,487	51.9
Republican	David Hartsuch (incumbent)	2,307	48.1
Total votes		4,794	100.0

Iowa Senate, District 41 Democratic Primary, 2010
Party	Candidate	Votes	%
Democratic	Richard A. Clewell	596	55.4
Democratic	Dave Thede	479	44.6
Total votes		1,075	100.0

Iowa Senate, District 41 General Election, 2010
Party	Candidate	Votes	%
Republican	Roby Smith	13,865	59.5
Democratic	Richard A. Clewell	9,432	40.5
Total votes		23,297	100.0
Republican hold			

=== District 43 ===
Iowa Senate, District 43 Republican Primary, 2010
Party	Candidate	Votes	%
Republican	Mark J. Riley	840	57.0
Republican	Mark N. Holloway	634	43.0
Total votes		1,474	100.0

Iowa Senate, District 43 General Election, 2010
Party	Candidate	Votes	%
Democratic	Joe M. Seng (incumbent)	9,894	62.3
Republican	Mark J. Riley	5,991	37.7
Total votes		15,885	100.0
Democratic hold			

=== District 45 ===
Iowa Senate, District 45 Republican Primary, 2010
Party	Candidate	Votes	%
Republican	Sandra Greiner	3,811	66.3
Republican	Randy J. Besick	1,261	22.0
Republican	Rick Marlar	672	11.7
Total votes		5,744	100.0

Iowa Senate, District 45 General Election, 2010
Party	Candidate	Votes	%
Republican	Sandra Greiner	11,664	50.7
Democratic	Becky Schmitz (incumbent)	10,196	44.4
Independent	Douglas William Philips	1,131	4.9
Total votes		22,991	100.0
Republican gain from Democratic			

=== District 47 ===
Iowa Senate, District 47 General Election, 2010
Party	Candidate	Votes	%
Republican	Mark Chelgren	9,582	50.03
Democratic	Keith A. Kreiman (incumbent)	9,572	49.97
Total votes		19,154	100.0
Republican gain from Democratic			

=== District 49 ===
Iowa Senate, District 49 General Election, 2010
Party	Candidate	Votes	%
Republican	Hubert Houser (incumbent)	15,017	74.0
Democratic	Scott Schondelmeyer	5,281	26.0
Total votes		20,298	100.0
Republican hold			

== See also ==
- United States elections, 2010
- United States House of Representatives elections in Iowa, 2010
- Elections in Iowa
