= 2006 Iowa Senate election =

2006 Iowa State Senate election
- November 7, 2006

25 out of 50 seats in the Iowa State Senate 26 seats needed for a majority
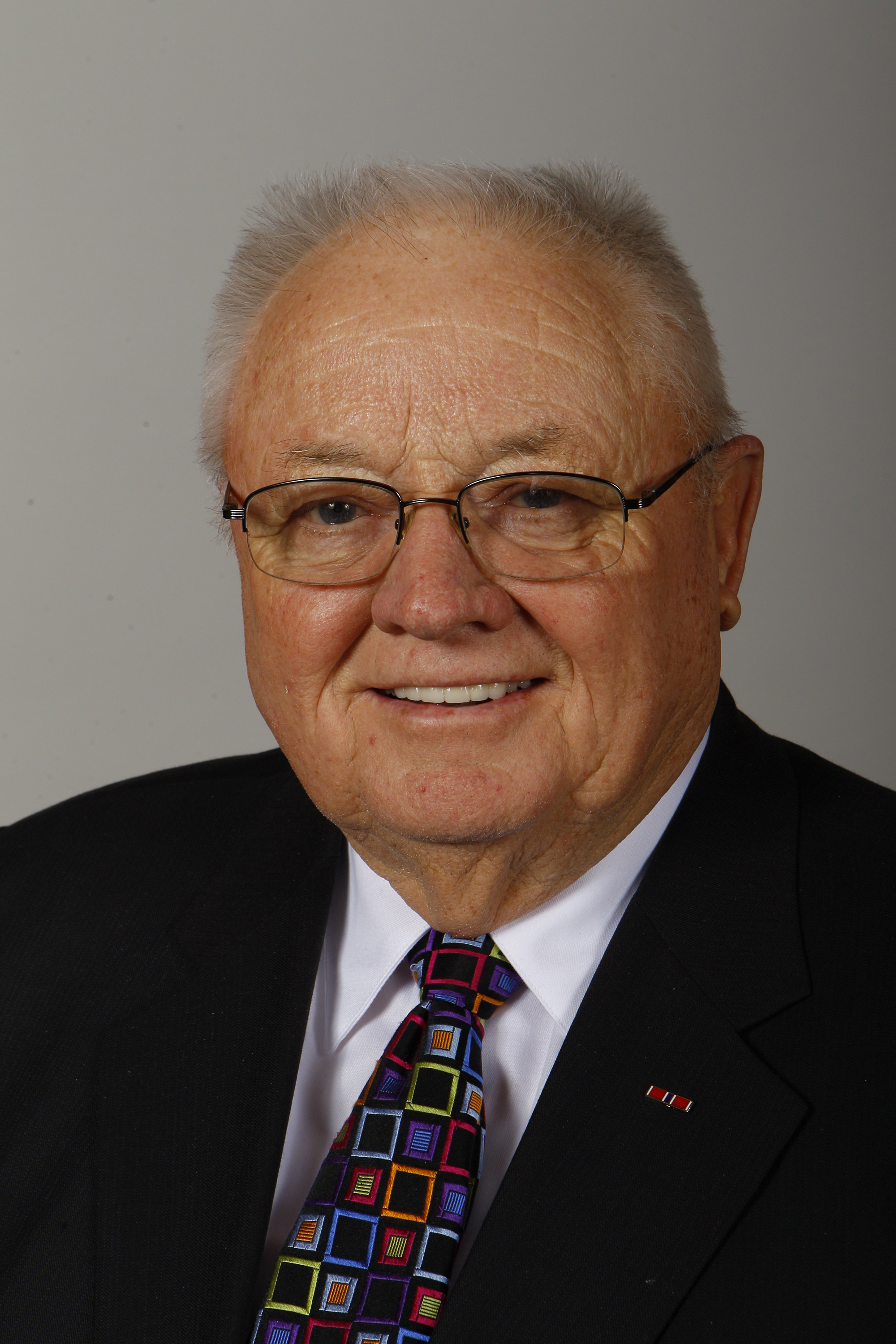

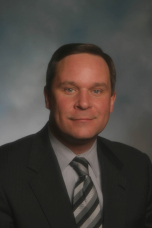
| | Majority party | Minority party |
|---|---|---|
| Leader | Jack Kibbie | Jeff Lamberti |
| Party | Democratic | Republican |
| Leader's seat | 4th | 35th (retired) |
| Last election | 25 | 25 |
| Seats before | 25 | 25 |
| Seats after | 30 | 20 |
| Seat change | ▲5 | ▼5 |
- Results of the elections: Democratic gain Democratic hold Republican hold No election
President(s) of the Senate before election
Jack Kibbie & Jeff Lamberti
Democratic & Republican, respectively
Elected President(s) of the Senate
Jack Kibbie
Democratic

The 2006 Iowa Senate election was held on November 7, 2006. The Senate seats for the twenty-five odd-numbered districts were up for election. Senate terms are staggered such that half the membership is elected every two years. Senators serve four-year terms. Prior to the election, the Senate was evenly divided between Republicans and Democrats. Following the election, the Democrats were in the majority - this marked the first time in 42 years that the Democrats had controlled both branches of the Iowa General Assembly and the Governor's Office.

== Senate composition ==
2006 Elections
| Democratic held and uncontested | 15 |
| Contested | 18 |
| Republican held and uncontested | 17 |
| Total | 50 |

== Predictions ==
| Source | Ranking | As of |
|---|---|---|
| Rothenberg | Tossup | November 4, 2006 |

== Results ==
Final results from the Iowa Secretary of State:
* indicates incumbent

=== District 1 ===
2006 State Senate District 1 election
| Party | Candidate | Votes | % | ±% |
|---|---|---|---|---|
| Democratic | Steve Warnstadt* | 9,340 | 66.9% | |
| Republican | Barbara Blanchard | 4,607 | 33.0% | |
| Total votes | | 13,956 | 100.0% | |
| Majority | | | | |
| Turnout | | | | |

=== District 3 ===
2006 State Senate District 3 election
| Party | Candidate | Votes | % | ±% |
|---|---|---|---|---|
| Republican | David Johnson* | 12,328 | 57.3% | |
| Democratic | Mel Berryhill | 8,534 | 39.7% | |
| Total votes | | 21,520 | 100.0% | |
| Majority | | | % | |
| Turnout | | | | |

=== District 5 ===
2006 State Senate District 5 election
| Party | Candidate | Votes | % | ±% |
|---|---|---|---|---|
| Democratic | Rich Olive | 11,224 | 49.7% | |
| Republican | Jim Kurtenbach | 11,162 | 49.4% | |
| Total votes | | 22,584 | 100.0% | |
| Majority | | | % | |
| Turnout | | | | |

=== District 7 ===
2006 State Senate District 7 election
| Party | Candidate | Votes | % | ±% |
|---|---|---|---|---|
| Democratic | Amanda Ragan* | 15,138 | 70.4% | |
| Republican | Kenneth D. Young | 5847 | 27.2% | |
| Total votes | | 21,484 | 100.0% | |
| Majority | | | % | |
| Turnout | | | | |

=== District 9 ===
2006 State Senate District 9 election
| Party | Candidate | Votes | % | ±% |
|---|---|---|---|---|
| Democratic | Bill Heckroth | 11,902 | 52.4% | |
| Republican | Tom Hoogestraat | 10,556 | 46.5% | |
| Total votes | | 22,711 | 100.0% | |
| Majority | | | % | |
| Turnout | | | | |

=== District 11 ===
2006 State Senate District 11 election
| Party | Candidate | Votes | % | ±% |
|---|---|---|---|---|
| Democratic | Bill Dotzler* | 11,782 | 70.0% | |
| Republican | Jim Buschkamp | 5,033 | 29.9% | |
| Total votes | | 16,841 | 100.0% | |
| Majority | | | % | |
| Turnout | | | | |

=== District 13 ===
2006 State Senate District 13 election
| Party | Candidate | Votes | % | ±% |
|---|---|---|---|---|
| Democratic | Roger Tabor Stewart* | 12,886 | 64.8% | |
| Republican | Lametta K. Wynn | 6,748 | 33.9% | |
| Total votes | | 19,899 | 100.0% | |
| Majority | | | 100.0% | |
| Turnout | | | | |

=== District 15 ===
2006 State Senate District 15 election
| Party | Candidate | Votes | % | ±% |
|---|---|---|---|---|
| Democratic | Robert E. Dvorsky* | 19,027 | 78.0% | |
| Total votes | | 24,385 | 100.0% | |
| Majority | | | % | |
| Turnout | | | | |

=== District 17 ===
2006 State Senate District 17 election
| Party | Candidate | Votes | % | ±% |
|---|---|---|---|---|
| Democratic | Wally E. Horn* | 15,332 | 99.3% | |
| Total votes | | 15,441 | 100.0% | |
| Majority | | | % | |
| Turnout | | | | |

=== District 19 ===
2006 State Senate District 19 election
| Party | Candidate | Votes | % | ±% |
|---|---|---|---|---|
| Democratic | Robert M. Hogg | 14,112 | 59.2% | |
| Republican | Renee Schulte | 9,721 | 40.8% | |
| Total votes | | 23,847 | 100.0% | |
| Majority | | | % | |
| Turnout | | | | |

=== District 21 ===
2006 State Senate District 21 election
| Party | Candidate | Votes | % | ±% |
|---|---|---|---|---|
| Democratic | Dennis Black* | 13,486 | 56.3% | |
| Republican | Tim Morgan | 10,456 | 43.7% | |
| Total votes | | 23,949 | 100.0% | |
| Majority | | | % | |
| Turnout | | | | |

=== District 23 ===
2006 State Senate District 23 election
| Party | Candidate | Votes | % | ±% |
|---|---|---|---|---|
| Democratic | Herman C. Quirmbach* | 11,782 | 57.4% | |
| Republican | Linda Livingston | 8,735 | 42.5% | |
| Total votes | | 20,537 | 100.0% | |
| Majority | | | % | |
| Turnout | | | | |

=== District 25 ===
2006 State Senate District 25 election
| Party | Candidate | Votes | % | ±% |
|---|---|---|---|---|
| Democratic | Daryl Beall* | 13,032 | 65.8% | |
| Republican | Tom Sooter | 6,400 | 32.3% | |
| Total votes | | 19,811 | 100.0% | |
| Majority | | | % | |
| Turnout | | | | |

=== District 27 ===
2006 State Senate District 27 election
| Party | Candidate | Votes | % | ±% |
|---|---|---|---|---|
| Republican | Ron Wieck* | 13,459 | 99.0% | |
| Total votes | | 13,591 | 100.0% | |
| Majority | | | % | |
| Turnout | | | | |

=== District 29 ===
2006 State Senate District 29 election
| Party | Candidate | Votes | % | ±% |
|---|---|---|---|---|
| Republican | Nancy Boettger* | 14,474 | 78.1% | |
| Total votes | | 18,543 | 100.0% | |
| Majority | | | % | |
| Turnout | | | | |

=== District 31 ===
2006 State Senate District 31 election
| Party | Candidate | Votes | % | ±% |
|---|---|---|---|---|
| Democratic | Matt McCoy* | 13,276 | 65.6% | |
| Republican | Nicholas G. Van Patten | 6941 | 34.3% | |
| Total votes | | 20,247 | 100.0% | |
| Majority | | | % | |
| Turnout | | | | |

=== District 33 ===
2006 State Senate District 33 election
| Party | Candidate | Votes | % | ±% |
|---|---|---|---|---|
| Democratic | Jack Hatch* | 10,204 | 98.5% | |
| Total votes | | 10,356 | 100.0% | |
| Majority | | | % | |
| Turnout | | | | |

=== District 35 ===
2006 State Senate District 35 election
| Party | Candidate | Votes | % | ±% |
|---|---|---|---|---|
| Republican | Larry L. Noble | 16,694 | 52.0% | |
| Democratic | Merle O. Johnson | 15,420 | 48.0% | |
| Total votes | | 32,132 | 100.0% | |
| Majority | | | % | |
| Turnout | | | | |

=== District 37 ===
2006 State Senate District 37 election
| Party | Candidate | Votes | % | ±% |
|---|---|---|---|---|
| Democratic | Staci Appel | 12,827 | 50.3% | |
| Republican | Julian B. Garrett | 12,055 | 48.44% | |
| Total votes | | 24,882 | 100.0% | |
| Majority | | | % | |
| Turnout | | | | |

=== District 39 ===
2006 State Senate District 39 election
| Party | Candidate | Votes | % | ±% |
|---|---|---|---|---|
| Democratic | Joe Bolkcom* | 14,816 | 68.9% | |
| Independent | Jay Christensen-Szalanski | 4,095 | 19.1% | |
| Total votes | | 21,492 | 100.0% | |
| Majority | | | % | |
| Turnout | | | | |

=== District 41 ===
2006 State Senate District 41 election
| Party | Candidate | Votes | % | ±% |
|---|---|---|---|---|
| Republican | David Hartsuch | 11,572 | 49.1% | |
| Democratic | Phyllis Thede | 11,136 | 47.2% | |
| Total votes | | 23,578 | 100.0% | |
| Majority | | | % | |
| Turnout | | | | |

=== District 43 ===
2006 State Senate District 43 election
| Party | Candidate | Votes | % | ±% |
|---|---|---|---|---|
| Democratic | Joe M. Seng* | 13,017 | 76.5% | |
| Total votes | | 17,012 | 100.0% | |
| Majority | | | % | |
| Turnout | | | | |

=== District 45 ===
2006 State Senate District 45 election
| Party | Candidate | Votes | % | ±% |
|---|---|---|---|---|
| Democratic | Becky Schmitz | 10,362 | 49.8% | |
| Republican | David Miller* | 10,178 | 49.0% | |
| Total votes | | 20,791 | 100.0% | |
| Majority | | | % | |
| Turnout | | | | |

=== District 47 ===
2006 State Senate District 47 election
| Party | Candidate | Votes | % | ±% |
|---|---|---|---|---|
| Democratic | Keith A. Kreiman* | 11,790 | 63.6% | |
| Republican | Keith Caviness | 6,183 | 33.3% | |
| Independent | Max Hulen | 566 | 3.1% | |
| Total votes | | 18,549 | 100.0% | |
| Majority | | | % | |
| Turnout | | | | |

=== District 49 ===
2006 State Senate District 49 election
| Party | Candidate | Votes | % | ±% |
|---|---|---|---|---|
| Republican | Hubert Houser* | 14,373 | 81.7% | |
| Total votes | | 17,591 | 100.0% | |
| Majority | | | % | |
| Turnout | | | | |

== See also ==
- United States House of Representatives elections in Iowa, 2006
- Iowa Senate
- Iowa House of Representatives
- Iowa House of Representatives elections, 2006
- Iowa General Assembly
- Political party strength in U.S. states
