= Iowa's 5th Senate district =

American legislative district

Iowa's 5th State Senate district
Senator
| Dave Rowley; R |

Iowa's 5th State Senate district is located in Northwestern Iowa. It is currently composed of Dickinson, Emmet, Kossuth, and Palo Alto counties, and part of Clay County.

== Current elected officials ==
Dave Rowley is the senator currently representing the 5th District.

The area of the 5th District contains two Iowa House of Representatives districts:

- The 9th District (represented by Henry Stone)
- The 10th District (represented by John Wills)

The district is also located in Iowa's 4th congressional district, which is represented by U.S. Representative Randy Feenstra.

== List of representatives ==
| Representative | Party | Dates | Residence | Notes |
|---|---|---|---|---|
| Thomas Baker | Democrat | 1846–1847 | Polk County | Served as first president of the Iowa State Senate |
| Phineas Casady | Democrat | 1848–1851 | Des Moines | |
| Archibald McKinney | Whig | 1852–1853 | Henry County | |
| Alvin Saunders | Whig | 1854–1855 | Mt. Pleasant | |
| Henry Hoffman Trimble | Democrat | 1856–1859 | Bloomfield | |
| William Taylor | Democrat | 1860–1863 | Wayne County | It is unclear as to the reason of the overlap between Senator Taylor and Senator Esteb. |
| Elijah Esteb | Democrat | 1862–1863 | Wayne County | |
| Ziba Brown | Republican | 1864–1865 | Clarke County | |
| Eugene Edwards | Republican | 1866–1867 | Chariton | |
| James D. Wright | Republican | 1868–1869 | Chariton | |
| Edward Bill | Republican | 1870–1871 | Albia | |
| Martin Read | Republican | 1872–1873 | Corydon | |
| Lloyd Selby | Anti-Monopoly | 1874-1875 | Corydon | |
| Henry Dashiell | Republican | 1876–1877 | Monroe County | |
| Samuel Bestow | Republican | 1878–1879 | Chariton, Iowa | |
| William Wilson | Republican | 1880–1883 | Osceola, Iowa | |
| John McDonough | Republican | 1884–1887 | Clarke County | |
| James Harsh | Republican | 1888–1895 | Creston, Iowa | |
| George Allyn | Republican | 1896–1903 | Mount Ayr, Iowa | |
| Marion Stookey | Republican | 1904–1908 | Leon, Iowa | |
| John Brown | Republican | 1909–1912 | Decatur County | |
| Charles Thomas | Republican | 1913–1916 | Creston, Iowa | |
| James Stephenson | Democrat | 1917–1920 | Mount Ayr, Iowa | |
| John McIntosh | Republican | 1921–1924 | Decatur County | |
| Henry Roberts | Republican | 1925–1928 | Mount Ayr, Iowa | |
| Frank Ickis | Republican | 1929–1932 | Creston, Iowa | |
| Frank Stevens | Democrat | 1933–1936 | Garden Grove, Iowa | |
| Howard Edwards | Republican | 1936–1940 | Tingley, Iowa | Records indicate that there was an overlap between Senators Stevens and Edwards. This was likely due to the political appointment of Senator Stevens at the end of his term. |
| Stephen Emerson | Republican | 1941–1943 | Creston, Iowa | |
| Theodore Thompson | Republican | 1944 | Creston, Iowa | Thompson was elected for the 50th Extraordinary Session in 1944, and then resigned to accept appointment as federal district court reporter for the southern Iowa district. |
| Roy Hawkins | Republican | 1945–1948 | Decatur County | |
| Xavier Thomas Prentis | Republican | 1949–1962 | Mount Ayr, Iowa | Prentis' given name was X T, his grandfather's initials. Some sources list his name as Xavier Thomas Prentis, a name likely given to him by the Army. |
| Franklin Main | Democrat | 1963–1964 | Mount Ayr, Iowa | |
| James Briles | Republican | 1965–1970 | Corning, Iowa | |
| Vernon Kyhl | Republican | 1971–1972 | Parkersburg, Iowa | Senator Kyhl died while in office in 1973. |
| Ray Taylor | Republican | 1973–1982 | Steamboat Rock, Iowa | |
| Arne Waldstein | Republican | 1983–1986 | Buena Vista County | |
| Linn Fuhrman | Republican | 1987–1994 | Buena Vista County | Senator Fuhrman died in office in 1994. |
| Mary Lou Freeman | Republican | 1993–2002 | Storm Lake, Iowa | |
| Stewart Iverson | Republican | 2003–2006 | Dows, Iowa | |
| Rich Olive | Democrat | 2007–2010 | Story City, Iowa | |
| Robert Bacon | Republican | 2011–2012 | Maxwell, Iowa | |
| Daryl Beall | Democrat | 2013–2014 | Fort Dodge, Iowa | |
| Tim Kraayenbrink | Republican | 2015–2022 | Fort Dodge, Iowa | |
| David Rowley | Republican | 2023–present | Dickinson County | |

== Historical district boundaries ==
| Map | Description | Years effective | Notes |
|---|---|---|---|
| | Dallas County Jasper County; Marion County; Polk County | 1846–1849 | From 1846 to 1857, district numbering was not utilized by the Iowa State Legislature. This convention was added with the passing of the 1857 Iowa Constitution. Numbering of districts pre-1857 is done as a matter of historic convenience. |
| | Boone County Dallas County; Jasper County; Madison County; Marion County; Marshall County; Polk County; Story County; Warren County | 1850–1851 | |
| | Henry County | 1852–1855 | |
| | Davis County | 1856–1859 | |
| | Decatur County Wayne County | 1860–1863 | |
| | Clarke County Lucas County; Wayne County | 1864–1869 | |
| | Wayne County Monroe County | 1870–1877 | |
| | Clarke County Lucas County; Union County | 1878–1883 | |
| | Clarke County Decatur County | 1884–1887 | |
| | Decatur County Ringgold County; Union County | 1888–1962 | |
| | Adams County Montgomery County; Taylor County | 1963–1966 | |
| | Adams County Montgomery County; Taylor County; Union County | 1967–1970 | |
| | Butler County Floyd County; Mitchell County | 1971–1972 | In 1970, the Iowa Legislature passed an amendment to the Iowa Constitution setting forth the rules for legislative redistricting in order to abide by the rules established by the Reynolds v. Sims Supreme Court case. The first reapportionment map created by the Republican controlled legislature was deemed unconstitutional, but was still used for the 1970 election. |
| | Cerro Gordo County (partial) Franklin County (partial); Hancock County (partial); Hardin County (partial); Wright County | 1973–1982 | |
| | Buena Vista Calhoun County; Pocahontas County (partial); Sac County; Webster County (partial) | 1983–1992 | |
| | Buena Vista Cherokee County; Clay County (partial); O'Brien County (partial); Plymouth County (partial); Pocahontas County | 1993–2002 | |
| | Hamilton County Story County (partial): Excluding; Franklin Township; Washington Township; Ames; Gilbert; Webster County (partial): Pleasant Valley Township; Sumner Township; Washington Township; Webster Township; Yell Township; Hardin Township; Coalville; Lehigh; Wright County | 2003–2012 | |
| | Calhoun County Humboldt County; Pocahontas County; Webster County (partial): Excluding; Burnside Township; Dayton Township; Hardin Township; Otho Township; Pleasant Valley Township; Washington Township; Webster Township; Yell Township; Coalville; Dayton; Lehigh; Otho | 2013–2022 | |
| | Clay County (partial): Freeman Township; Lake Township; Meadow Township; Sioux Township; Summit Township; Waterford Township; Fostoria; Ruthven; Dickinson County; Emmet County; Kossuth County; Palo Alto County; Winnebago County | 2023–present | |

== Recent election results from statewide races ==
| Year | Office | Results |
|---|---|---|
| 2008 | President | Obama 49–48% |
| 2012 | President | Romney 56–44% |
| 2016 | President | Trump 65–30% |
| 2016 | Senate | Grassley 71–25% |
| 2018 | Governor | Reynolds 62–36% |
| 2018 | Attorney General | Miller 76–24% |
| 2018 | Secretary of State | Pate 64–34% |
| 2018 | Treasurer | Davis 53–46% |
| 2018 | Auditor | Mosiman 58–39% |
| 2020 | President | Trump 67–32% |
| 2020 | Senate | Ernst 63–34% |
| 2022 | Senate | Grassley 70–29% |
| 2022 | Governor | Reynolds 73–25% |
| 2022 | Attorney General | Bird 65–35% |
| 2022 | Secretary of State | Pate 73–27% |
| 2022 | Treasurer | Smith 64–36% |
| 2022 | Auditor | Halbur 65–35% |
| 2024 | President | Trump 70–29% |

== See also ==
- Iowa General Assembly
- Iowa Senate
