= Bill Dix =

American politician

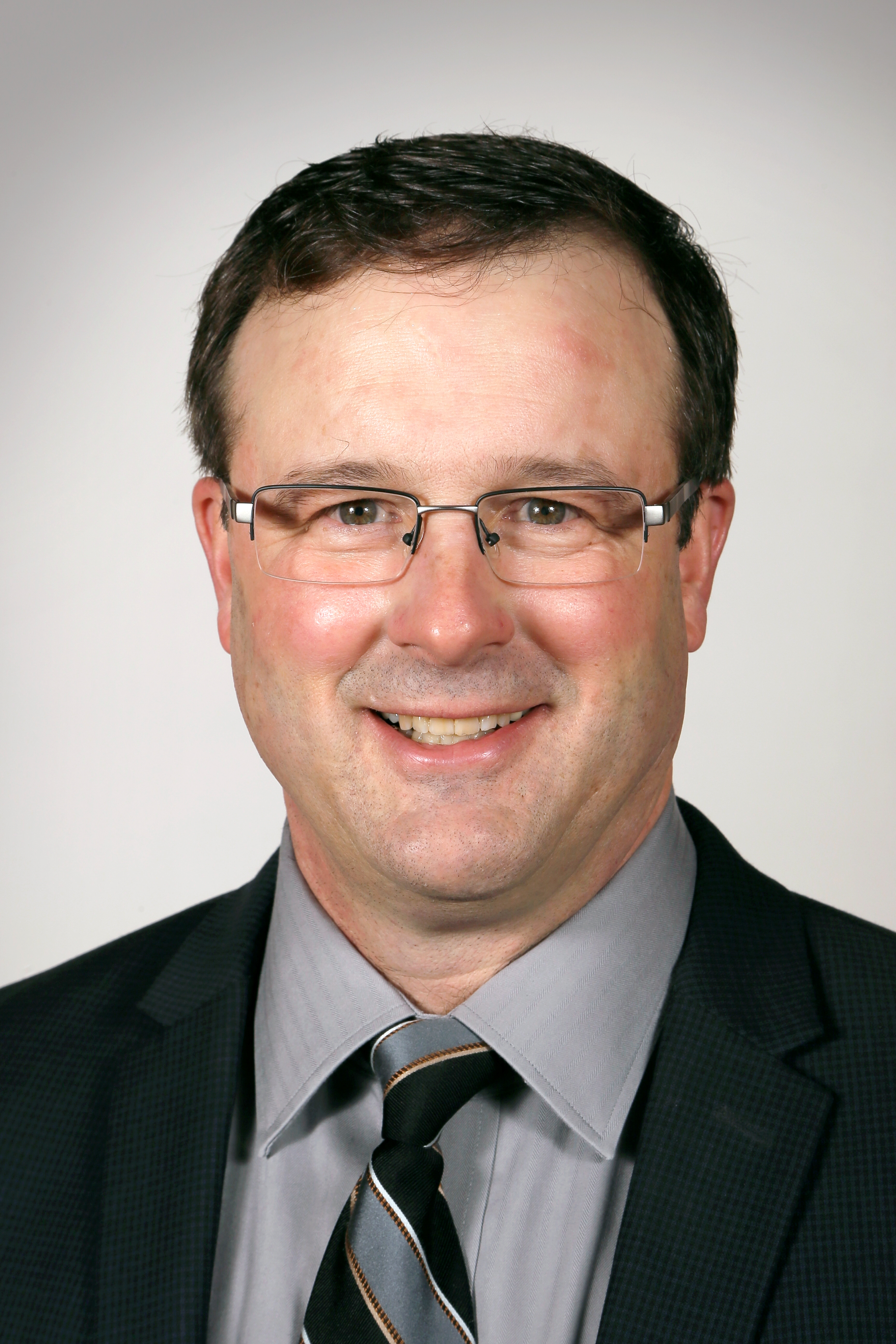
- Dix in 2015

Member of the Iowa Senate from the 25th district
- In office January 14, 2013 – March 12, 2018
- Preceded by: Daryl Beall
- Succeeded by: Annette Sweeney

Member of the Iowa Senate from the 9th district
- In office January 10, 2011 – January 13, 2013
- Preceded by: Bill Heckroth
- Succeeded by: Nancy Boettger

Member of the Iowa House of Representatives from the 17th district
- In office January 13, 2003 – January 7, 2007
- Succeeded by: Pat Grassley

Member of the Iowa House of Representatives from the 21st district
- In office January 13, 1997 – January 12, 2003
- Preceded by: Robert H. Renken

Personal details
- Born: Janesville, Iowa, U.S.
- Party: Republican
- Spouse: Gerri
- Children: 3
- Education: Iowa State University (B.S.)
- Occupation: Farmer

William C. Dix is a Republican politician and farmer from Shell Rock, Iowa. He was formerly the Majority Leader of the Iowa Senate representing Senate District 25, which covers Butler, Grundy, Hardin, and Story Counties. He was the Chair of the Rules and Administration Senate Committee.

He resigned from the Iowa Senate on March 12, 2018, following the release of video footage showing Dix, who was married with three children, kissing a lobbyist at a bar in Des Moines, Iowa.

== Elections ==
=== Iowa House of Representatives (1996–2006) ===
In 1996, Dix made his first bid for the Iowa House of Representatives running unopposed for House District 21 (covered Butler and Grundy Counties from 1993 to 2002 before redistricting from the 2000 Census) vacated by Robert H. Renken. Iowa Congressional and Legislative districts were redrawn after the 2000 Census that went into effect for the 2002 election. From 2002 to 2006, Dix represented House District 17 (covered Butler and Bremer Counties from 2002 to 2012). He served five two-year terms in the Iowa House being reelected in 1998, 2000, 2002, and 2004.

1996 Iowa House District 21
Party	Candidate	Votes	%
Republican	Bill Dix	7,803	99%
N/A	Unopposed	0	0%
Majority		—	—
Republican hold

1998 Iowa House District 21
Party	Candidate	Votes	%
Republican	Bill Dix	7,698	99%
N/A	Unopposed	0	0%
Majority		—	—

2000 Iowa House District 21
Party	Candidate	Votes	%
Republican	Bill Dix	10,171	99%
N/A	Unopposed	0	0%
Majority		—	—

2002 Iowa House District 17
Party	Candidate	Votes	%
Republican	Bill Dix	7,667	99%
N/A	Unopposed	0	0%
Majority		—	—

2004 Iowa House District 17
Party	Candidate	Votes	%
Republican	Bill Dix	11,702	95%
Write-In	Paul Uzel	438	3.5%
Majority		11,264	96.3%

=== Iowa's 1st Congressional District Primary (2006) ===
In 2006, Dix ran in the Republican Primary for Iowa's 1st Congressional District seat vacated by Jim Nussle.

2006 Republican Primary: 1st Congressional District
Party	Candidate	Votes	%
Republican	Bill Dix	8,483	37.4%
Republican	Brian Kennedy	3,172	14%
Republican	Mike Whalen	10,977	48.5%
Majority		2,494	13%
Democratic gain from Republican

=== Iowa Senate (2010–2018) ===
2010 Iowa Senate District 9
Party	Candidate	Votes	%
Democratic	Bill Heckroth	9,605	41%
Republican	Bill Dix	13,189	57%
Majority		3,584	16%
Republican gain from Democratic

2014 Iowa Senate District 25
Party	Candidate	Votes	%
Republican	Bill Dix	18,267	99%
N/A	Unopposed	0	0%
Majority		—	—

Iowa Senate
Preceded by Russell Teig	17th District; 2003 – 1997	Succeeded by Vacant
Preceded by William Heckroth	21st District; 1993–2003	Succeeded by Nancy Boettger
