= Donald Hansen (disambiguation) =

Donald Hansen may refer to:

- Donald Hansen (1924–1981), Canadian politician from Alberta
- Don Hansen (born 1944), American football linebacker
- Donald Hanson (1926–2012), American politician from Iowa
