= Heckroth =

Heckroth is a surname. Notable people with the surname include:

- Bill Heckroth (born 1949), American politician
- Hein Heckroth (1901–1970), German art director
