= Iowa's 26th House of Representatives district =

American legislative district

House District 26
- Type: District of the Lower house
- Location: Iowa
- Representative: Austin Harris
- Parent organization: Iowa General Assembly

The 26th District of the Iowa House of Representatives in the state of Iowa is composed of Monroe and Davis counties, and part of Wapello and Appanoose counties.

== Representatives ==
The district has been represented by:

- William P. Winkelman, 1971–1973
- Joan Miller Lipsky, 1975–1979
- Robert Max L. Johnson, 1979–1983
- John E. McIntee, 1983–1987
- Patricia Harper, 1987–1991
- Donald Hanson, 1991–1993
- Patricia Harper, 1993–1997
- William Dotzler, 1997–2003
- Polly Bukta, 2003–2011
- Mary Wolfe, 2011–2013
- Scott Ourth, 2013–2021
- Brooke Boden, 2021–2023
- Austin Harris, 2023–
