= Patricia Harper (politician) =

American politician

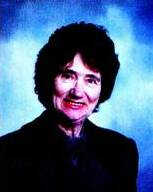

Member of the Iowa Senate from the 13th district
- In office April 10, 1997 – January 12, 2003
- Preceded by: Jim Lind
- Succeeded by: Roger Stewart

Member of the Iowa House of Representatives from the 26th district
- In office January 12, 1987 – January 13, 1991
- Preceded by: John McIntee
- Succeeded by: Donald Hanson
- In office January 11, 1993 – January 12, 1997
- Preceded by: Donald Hanson
- Succeeded by: William Dotzler

Personal details
- Born: December 4, 1932 (age 93) Cresco, Iowa, U.S.
- Party: Democratic
- Education: Iowa State Teachers College

Patricia Mullaney Harper (born December 4, 1932) is an American teacher and former politician in the state of Iowa. A Democrat, she served in the Iowa House of Representatives as the representative for the 26th district between 1987 and 1991 and between 1991 and 1997. She then served in the Iowa Senate for the 13th district between 1997 and 2003.

== Early life ==
Harper was born on December 4, 1932, in Cresco, Iowa, to Patrick Mullaney and Martha Mullaney (née Gossman). She graduated from Our Lady of Victory Academy in Waterloo in 1950. She received her bachelors of arts degree from the Iowa State Teachers College in 1954, majoring in mathematics and general science. She married James Harper the same year and the couple had a daughter, Susan, before divorcing. In 1961, she received a masters of arts degree from the State College of Iowa. She later completed graduate courses at a number of universities, including the University of Northern Iowa, Iowa State University, the University of Iowa, and Columbia University.

Harper began her teaching career in 1955 as a math and science teacher at Postville High School. She later worked for two decades at West High School. She served as the president of the Waterloo Education Association and the Hawkeye UniServ Unit. She also led the Waterloo chapter of the American Association of University Women and the Alliance for the Mentally Ill of Waterloo. Prior to running for office, Harper worked as a campaign manager for Don Shoultz.

== Political career ==
Harper was first elected to the Iowa House of Representatives for the 26th district between in the 1986 election, taking office on January 12, 1987. She beat Republican challenger Martin Borchelt for the seat vacated by John McIntee. During her first term, she advocated for the Excellence in Education program, which set a minimum wage for public school teachers. She was the vice chair of the health and human rights appropriation sub-committee, chair of the sub-committee on elder affairs and House representative for the Commission on Elder Affairs. She was unopposed in the 1988 primary and ran against Republican Sara Rickert in the general election.

In the 1990 general election, Harper lost to Republican Donald Hanson. She ran for re-election when, in 1992, Hanson was moved to the 24th district as the result of redistricting. She ran on a platform of focusing on mental health services, education and healthcare. She was sworn in on January 11, 1993, and once again was appointed as a member of the Commission on Elder Affairs. She worked on a bill to improve training for law enforcement officers working with members of the public suffering from mental illness. She ran against Robert Lantz in the 1994 general election. She chose not to seek re-election in 1996.

Following the unexpected resignation of Jim Lind from the Iowa Senate on March 20, 1997, Harper ran as the Democratic nominee for the 13th district. She won the special election against Republican Steve Jordan and was sworn in on April 10, 1997. She represented the district until 2003, choosing not to run for re-election in 2002 after redistricting. She served as the ranking member of the ways and means committee.

== Legacy ==
Harper was honored in 2015 with the Rachel Fulton Public Service Award, which was granted by the League of Women Voters of Black Hawk-Bremer Counties. Her papers are held by the University of Iowa.
