= Wes Enos =

American politician

Member-elect of the Iowa Senate from the 23rd district
- Assuming office January 1, 2027
- Succeeding: Jack Whitver

Personal details
- Party: Republican
- Website: Campaign website

Wes Enos is an American politician. A member of the Republican Party, he is the member-elect of the Iowa State Senate for the 23rd district, having won election in 2026. He will succeed retiring Republican Jack Whitver in the 2026 election. Enos was a candidate in the 2010 Iowa Senate election. He worked on the Michele Bachmann 2012 presidential campaign in Iowa. He has served on Bondurant City Council and the Chamber of Commerce. He and his wife have four children.
