= Mona Martin =

American politician (born 1934)

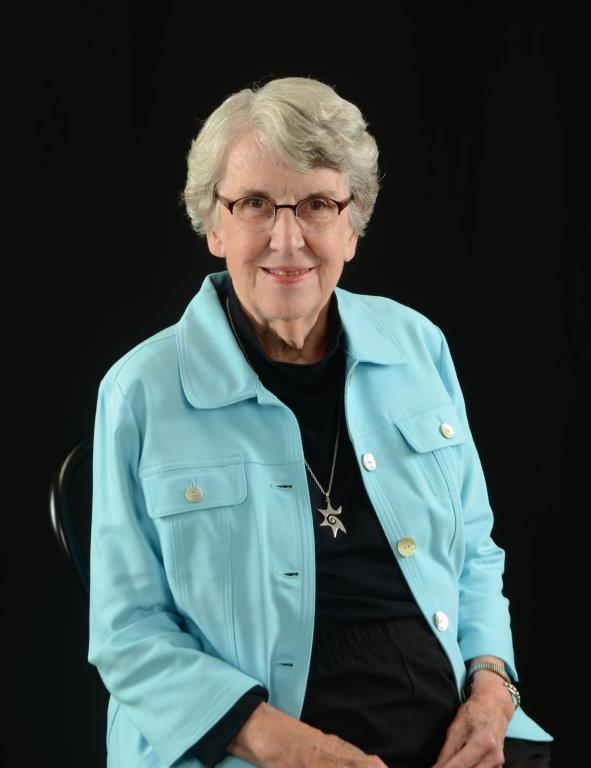
- Martin in 2020

Member of the Iowa House of Representatives from the 43rd District
- In office January 11, 1993 – January 7, 2001
- Preceding: David Osterberg
- Preceded by: Joe Seng

Personal details
- Born: Mona Lea Kadel; October 22, 1934 (age 91) Taylor Ridge, Illinois, US
- Party: Republican
- Spouse: Robert B. Martin
- Children: 2
- Education: Western Illinois University
- Occupation: Politician, teacher

Mona Lea Martin (née Kadel; October 22, 1934) is an American politician in the state of Iowa.

== Early life and education ==
She was born in Taylor Ridge, Illinois and has been a resident of Davenport, Iowa, since 1959. She received a B.S. in 1956 from Western Illinois State College in Macomb, Illinois, and did graduate work at both Iowa State University and the University of Iowa.

== Political career ==
A Republican, she served in the Iowa House of Representatives from 1993 to 2001 (43rd district).

As a state legislator, Mona went against insurance companies in 1996 when she pushed the "Maternity Stay" bill through the legislature, securing the Governor's signature. The law improved the lives of women and newborns by stopping "drive-by deliveries". Mona was lauded by colleagues from across the nation for leadership in orchestrating this change, which became a model for the national law. Beginning in 1997, Mona pushed through reforms aimed at safeguarding Iowa's older citizens from abuse and neglect in nursing homes. The final reform was her foresighted bill consolidating the state's six criminal and abuse registries into a single database, an achievement which garnered the State of Iowa the Smithsonian National Museum's prestigious Laureate Award for Technology Innovation in 2000. As a legislator, Mona also scuttled a movement to sunset the Iowa Department of Human Rights and the Iowa Commission on the Status of Women in 1997 when a male legislator disliked the Department because "there was no Commission on the Status of Men". Mona sponsored and floor-managed the Equal Rights Amendment to Iowa's Constitution and was instrumental in the amendment's passage in 1998. In 2000, Mona was the chief House sponsor and floor manager of the "Pill Bill", a measure requiring insurance companies to provide coverage for prescription contraceptive drugs, devices and services.

Throughout her life, Mona's career has encompassed work as a newspaper reporter, biology/earth science teacher, community leader, and state legislator, serving in the Iowa House of Representatives from 1993 to 2001. Mona also served as president of the League of Women Voters of Iowa and on numerous national advisory panels for the League of Women Voters. Mona was named to leadership roles in the National Conference of State Legislatures, where she chaired the 198-member Committee on Children, Families and Health, and represented NCSL at national forums and at several conclaves in Germany. From 1986 to 1990, Mona served as President of the Iowa Chapter, United Nations Association of the United States of America. She was appointed to the U.S. Department of Energy's Consumer Affairs Advisory Committee which she chaired from 1979 to 1981.

In 2019, Mona Martin was inducted in the Iowa Women's Hall of Fame.
