= Mark Chelgren =

American politician

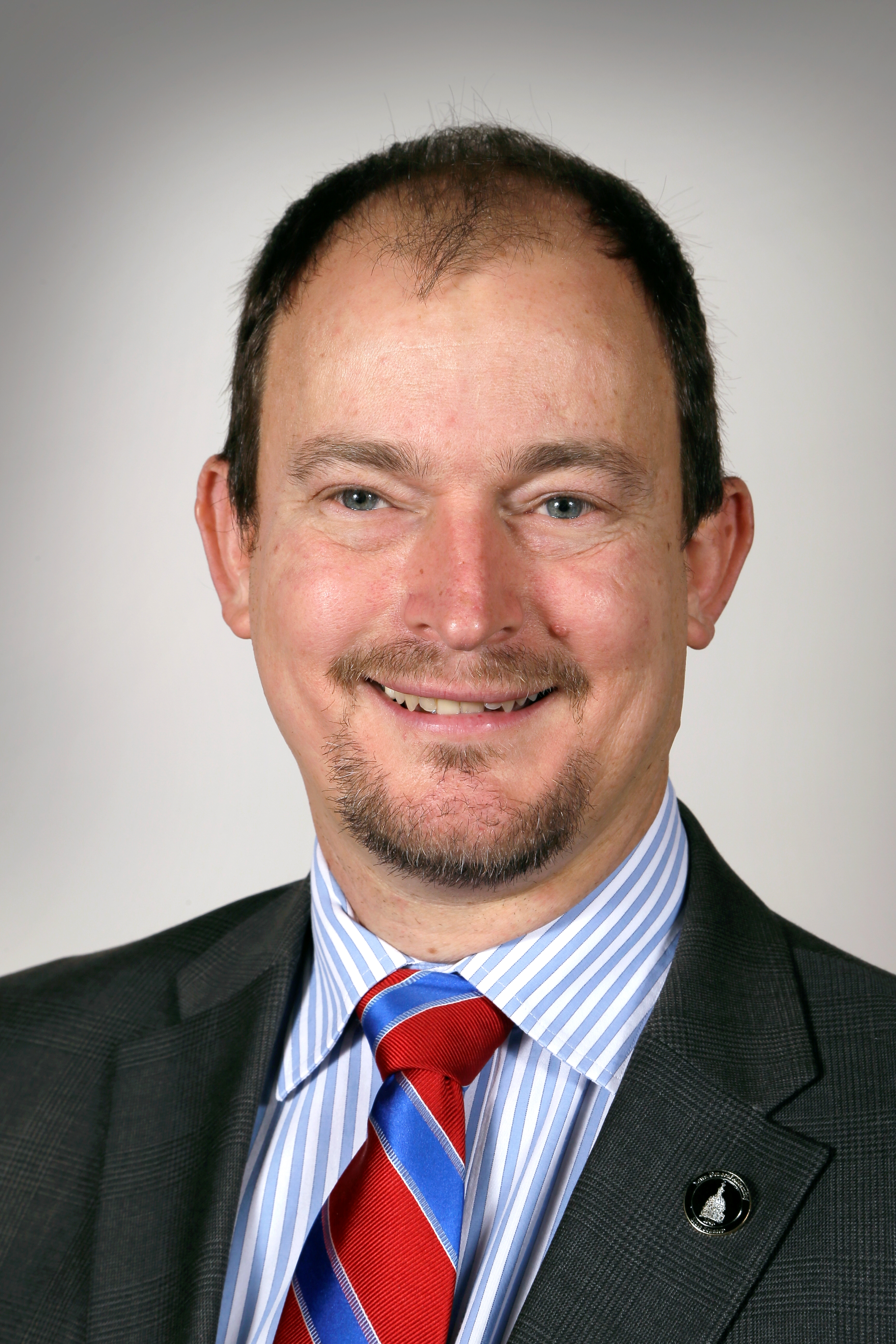

Member of the Iowa Senate from the 41st district
- In office January 10, 2011 – January 14, 2019
- Preceded by: Keith Kreiman
- Succeeded by: Mariannette Miller-Meeks

Personal details
- Born: Eric Mark Chelgren; January 21, 1968 (age 58) Ross, California
- Party: Republican
- Spouse: Janet
- Children: 4
- Education: Riverside Community College

Eric Mark Chelgren (born January 21, 1968) is an American politician. A member of the Republican Party, he was elected to represent District 41 in the Iowa Senate in 2010 and re-elected in 2014.

He has drawn controversy for proposing legislation that would cap the percentage difference in political parties of professors and instructors that state universities can hire. He also drew controversy for his false claim of having a "business degree" from the "Forbco Management School," which was in fact a manager training course run by a company that operated Sizzler restaurants in southern California.

Chelgren announced in March 2018 that he would not be a candidate for reelection in 2018.

== Early life ==
Chelgren was born in Ross, California, on January 21, 1968. He grew up in Huntington Beach, and graduated from Huntington Beach High School in 1986. At the start of his career, Chelgren's employment included managing a Sizzler restaurant in Torrance, California.

== Business ==
In the 1990s, Chelgren relocated to Iowa, and settled in Vinton. The Iowa Senate Republicans organization states that "Senator Chelgren is an entrepreneur with multiple patents, primarily focused in health care".

== Education ==
As of February 2017, Chelgren's Iowa State Legislature biography lists his education as an A.S. at Riverside Community College and says he attended University of California, Riverside. His Senate biography used to indicate that he "has a degree in business management from Forbco Management school and attended the University of California at Riverside majoring in astro-physics, geo-physics and mathematics."

Chelgren's education became an issue in 2017 when he proposed a bill to quiz prospective university professors on their political affiliation, and enact a percentage system to ensure that Iowa's institutions of higher learning did not hire what he deemed an inappropriately high percentage of Democrats and liberals. In defending his proposed legislation, Chelgren claimed to have witnessed what he termed excessive liberal advocacy among the professors of the college he attended. Subsequent investigation of his educational background called this claim into question. In February 2017, news accounts revealed that Forbco Management was not an accredited school that awarded degrees but was a company "which ran Sizzler restaurants and a few other different restaurants." Chelgren worked for Forbco as an assistant manager at a Sizzler restaurant while a young adult in California and completed the 6-month course as part of his training.

Prior to February 2017, a Republican Party site's biography indicated he attended the University of California, Riverside for three years. When the university's spokesman indicated that he had attended for one school year, 1992 to 1993, Chelgren told NBC that he had attended University of California, Riverside for one year, and had earned an associate degree in science from Riverside Community College after two years of attendance. When asked if he mischaracterized his educational background, Chelgren said, "No, I did not."

Other biographies are also inconsistent on the question of Chelgren's higher education. In the biography on one of his business's websites, FrogLegs Incorporated he claims to have "completed his education in Astro- and Geo-Physics at the University of California in Riverside"."

Chelgren's biography in the Iowa Republican Party's 2014 candidate guide states that "He received his degree in Astro- and Geo-Physics at the University of California in Riverside."

In a biography from a 2015-2016 Iowa Legislature directory, he lists an associate degree from Riverside Community College and attendance at the University of California. In a 2016 legislative biography published by the Advocacy Cooperative of Des Moines, Chelgren is listed as holding a "Degree in Astrophysics and Geophysics (University of California Riverside)".

== Political career ==
In 2010, Chelgren was elected to the Iowa Senate, defeating incumbent Democrat Keith Kreiman with 9,572 to 9,582 votes. In 2011, Chelgren endorsed Michele Bachmann in the 2012 presidential election.

In 2014, Chelgren was re-elected, defeating Democrat Steve Siegel 10,331 to 9,954 votes.

In 2015, he provoked controversy when he suggested "if an undocumented person who committed a felony is deported and then tries to return to the U.S., he or she should be subject to capital punishment."

In 2016, Chelgren was a U.S. congressional candidate for Iowa's 2nd District but withdrew in March.

In 2018, Chelgren announced that he would not be a candidate for reelection that year.

In 2022, Chelgren was seeking to be elected (as a house representative instead of a state senator) to fill the vacant seat of the newly-created house district 26, however, he was defeated by Austin Harris.

== Electoral history ==
Election	Political result	Candidate	Party	Votes	%
Iowa's 47th Senate District election, 2010	Republican gain from Democratic	Mark Chelgren	Republican	9,583	50.0
Iowa's 47th Senate District election, 2010	Republican gain from Democratic	Keith Kreiman	Democratic	9,572	50.0
Iowa's 41st Senate District election, 2014	Republican hold	Mark Chelgren	Republican	10,356	50.8
Iowa's 41st Senate District election, 2014	Republican hold	Steve Siegel	Democratic	9,982	49.0
Iowa's 26th House District primary elections, 2022	Republican hold	Austin Harris	Republican	1,610	54.97
Iowa's 26th House District primary elections, 2022	Republican hold	Mark Chelgren	Republican	1,314	44.86

Iowa Senate
Preceded by Keith Kreiman	47th district 2011–2013	Succeeded by Roby Smith
Preceded by Roby Smith	41st district 2013–2019	Succeeded by Incumbent
