= Joe Seng =

American politician (1946–2016)

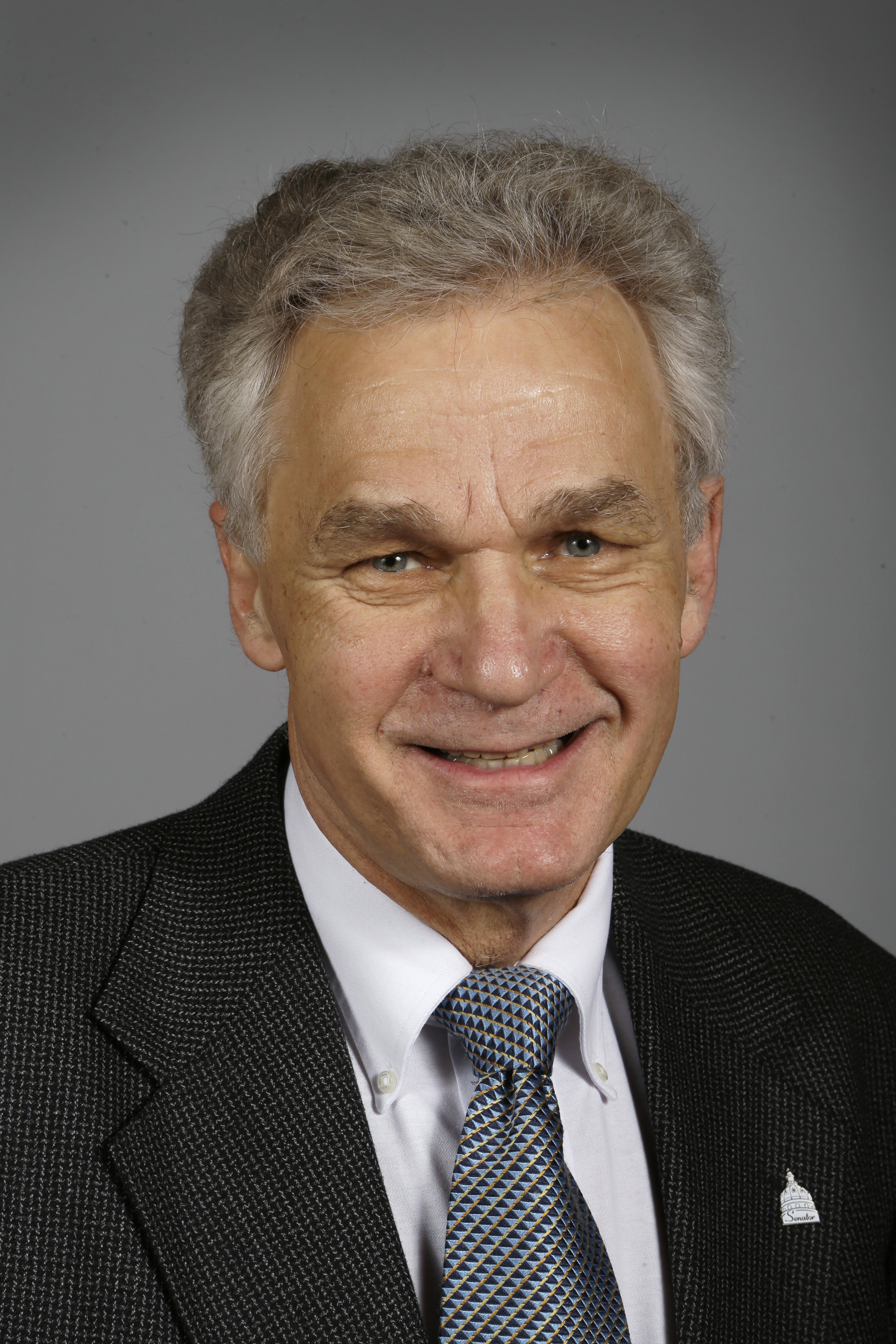

Member of the Iowa Senate from the 45th district 43rd (2003–2012)
- In office January 13, 2003 – September 16, 2016
- Preceded by: Derryl McLaren
- Succeeded by: Jim Lykam

Member of the Iowa House of Representatives from the 43rd district
- In office January 8, 2001 – January 12, 2003
- Preceded by: Mona Martin
- Succeeded by: Mark Smith

Personal details
- Born: September 27, 1946 Lost Nation, Iowa, U.S.
- Died: September 16, 2016 (aged 69) Davenport, Iowa, U.S.
- Party: Democratic
- Spouse: Mary Seng
- Education: Iowa State University
- Occupation: Veterinarian
- Website: Seng's website

Joe M. Seng (September 27, 1946 – September 16, 2016) was the Iowa State Senator from the 45th District. A Democrat, he served in the Iowa Senate from 2003 until 2016. He received a DVM from Iowa State University and worked as a veterinarian in Davenport, running a veterinary clinic for low income families.

As of October 2011, Seng served on several committees in the Iowa Senate - the Commerce, Ethics, and Natural Resources and Environment committees. He also served as chair of the Agriculture Committee and as vice chair of the Ways and Means Committee, as well as serving as a member of the Economic Development Appropriations Subcommittee. Before serving in the Senate, Seng served as the 43rd District representative in the Iowa House of Representatives from 2000 to 2002 and served as an alderman in Davenport. Seng died in office on September 16, 2016, from brain cancer.

== Electoral history ==
Election	Political result	Candidate	Party	Votes	%
Iowa House of Representatives primary elections, 2000; District 43; Turnout: 346	Democratic	Joe Seng	Democratic	295	85.3
Iowa House of Representatives primary elections, 2000; District 43; Turnout: 346	Democratic	Robert Juarez	Democratic	49	14.2
Iowa House of Representatives elections, 2000; District 43; Turnout: 11,487	Democratic gain from Republican	Joe Seng	Democratic	6,480	56.4
Iowa House of Representatives elections, 2000; District 43; Turnout: 11,487	Democratic gain from Republican	Tom Ryan	Republican	4,841	42.1
Iowa Senate elections, 2002; District 43; Turnout: 16,167	Democratic (newly redistricted)	Joe M. Seng*	Democratic	11,043	68.3
Iowa Senate elections, 2002; District 43; Turnout: 16,167	Democratic (newly redistricted)	John D. Gumpert	Republican	4,728	29.2
Iowa Senate elections, 2002; District 43; Turnout: 16,167	Democratic (newly redistricted)	Rich Moroney	Libertarian	385	2.4
Iowa Senate elections, 2006; District 43	Democratic hold	Joe M. Seng*	Democratic	unopposed	
Iowa Senate elections, 2010; District 43; Turnout: 16,245	Democratic hold	Joe M. Seng*	Democratic	9,894	60.9
Iowa Senate elections, 2010; District 43; Turnout: 16,245	Democratic hold	Mark J. Riley	Republican	5,991	36.9

- *Incumbent

Iowa Senate
Preceded by Derryl McLaren	43rd district 2003–2012	Succeeded by Joe Bolkcom
Preceded by Sandy Greiner	45th district 2013–2016	Succeeded by Jim Lykam
Iowa House of Representatives
Preceded by Mona Martin	43rd district 2001–2003	Succeeded by Mark Smith
