= Roy B. Hawkins =

American politician and lawyer (1885–1969)

Roy Baker Hawkins (6 May 1885 – 11 February 1969) was an American lawyer and politician from Iowa.

Roy Baker Hawkins was a native of Des Moines, Iowa, born to parents John A. and Delia Hawkins on 6 May 1885. After graduating from Drake University in 1907, Hawkins passed the bar exam and returned to Drake Law School to complete his juris doctor degree in 1909–1910. Hawkins subsequently became a farmer. In 1924, Hawkins was elected to the first of two terms as Decatur County attorney, stepping down in 1929 to focus on his private legal practice in Leon, from which he retired in 1968.

Hawkins served as a Republican member of the Iowa House of Representatives from 11 January 1943 to 7 January 1945 for District 6. Thereafter, he served one four-year term in the Iowa Senate for District 5, followed by another two-year term as state representative for House District 6 between 12 January 1953 and 9 January 1955.

Hawkins married Evangeline Keister, with whom he had two children, in 1912. Following the deaths of Keister and their son Roger in 1935, Hawkins married Gallatin, Missouri, native Georgia Doolin Netherton in 1939. Roy Hawkins died on 11 February 1969, at the Iowa Methodist Hospital in Des Moines. He was survived by his biological daughter Helen Gowdy, an adopted daughter Jennifer, and his second wife.
