= Austin Harris =

American politician

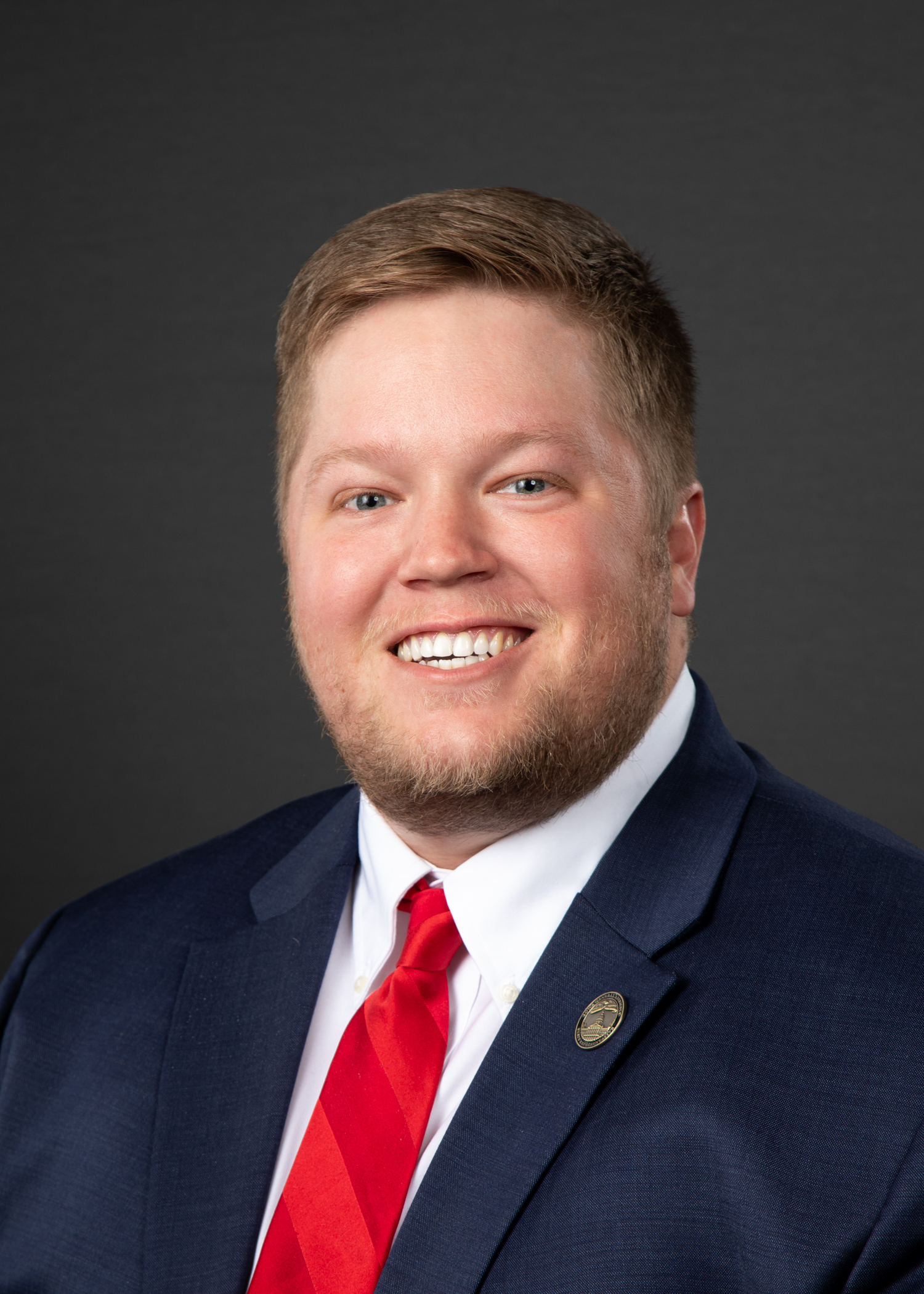

Member of the Iowa House of Representatives from the 26th district
- Incumbent
- Assumed office January 9, 2023
- Preceded by: Brooke Boden

Personal details
- Born: Austin Rex Harris; November 6, 1995 (age 30) Moulton, Iowa, U.S.
- Party: Republican
- Education: Indian Hills Community College
- Occupation: Farmer

Austin Rex Harris (born 1995), is an American politician from the state of Iowa. A member of the Republican Party, he was elected to represent the 26th district in the Iowa House of Representatives in the 2022 election.

== Early life and education ==
Harris was born in Ottumwa, Iowa, in 1995, and was raised in Moulton, Iowa, where he resides with his family. He attended Moulton-Udell High School. Harris earned an associates degree from Indian Hills Community College.

== Political career ==
After facing Mark Chelgren in the Republican Party primary, Harris was elected to the Iowa House of Representatives in the 2022 election, representing the 26th district. He endorsed Nikki Haley for the 2024 Republican Party presidential primaries. Harris won reelection in 2024, defeating Democratic candidate Darcie Whitlow and Libertarian candidate Donald Gier.

=== Committee assignments ===
As of January 2025, Harris serves on the following committees in the Iowa House:

- Health and Human Services (chair)
- Commerce
- Natural Resources
- State Government

== Electoral history ==
*incumbent

=== 2022 ===
Election	Political result	Candidate	Party	Votes	%
Iowa House primary elections, 2022; District 26	Republican	Austin Harris	Republican	1,610	54.97
Iowa House primary elections, 2022; District 26	Republican	Mark Chelgren	Republican	1,314	44.86
Iowa House primary elections, 2022; District 26	Republican	Write-ins	Republican	5	0.17
Iowa House general election, 2022; District 26	Republican	Austin Harris	Republican	9,635	98.46
Iowa House general election, 2022; District 26	Republican	Write-ins		151	1.54

=== 2024 ===
Election	Political result	Candidate	Party	Votes	%
Iowa House primary elections, 2024; District 26	Republican	Austin Harris*	Republican	2,447	98.47
Iowa House primary elections, 2024; District 26	Republican	Write-ins	Republican	38	1.53
Iowa House general election, 2024; District 26	Republican	Austin Harris*	Republican	10,842	71.48
Iowa House general election, 2024; District 26	Republican	Darcie Whitlow	Democratic	3,658	24.12
Iowa House general election, 2024; District 26	Republican	Donald Gier	Libertarian	635	4.19
Iowa House general election, 2024; District 26	Republican	Write-ins		32	02.17

Iowa House of Representatives
Preceded by Brooke Boden	26th district 2023–2025	Succeeded by Incumbent
