= Tim Kraayenbrink =

American politician

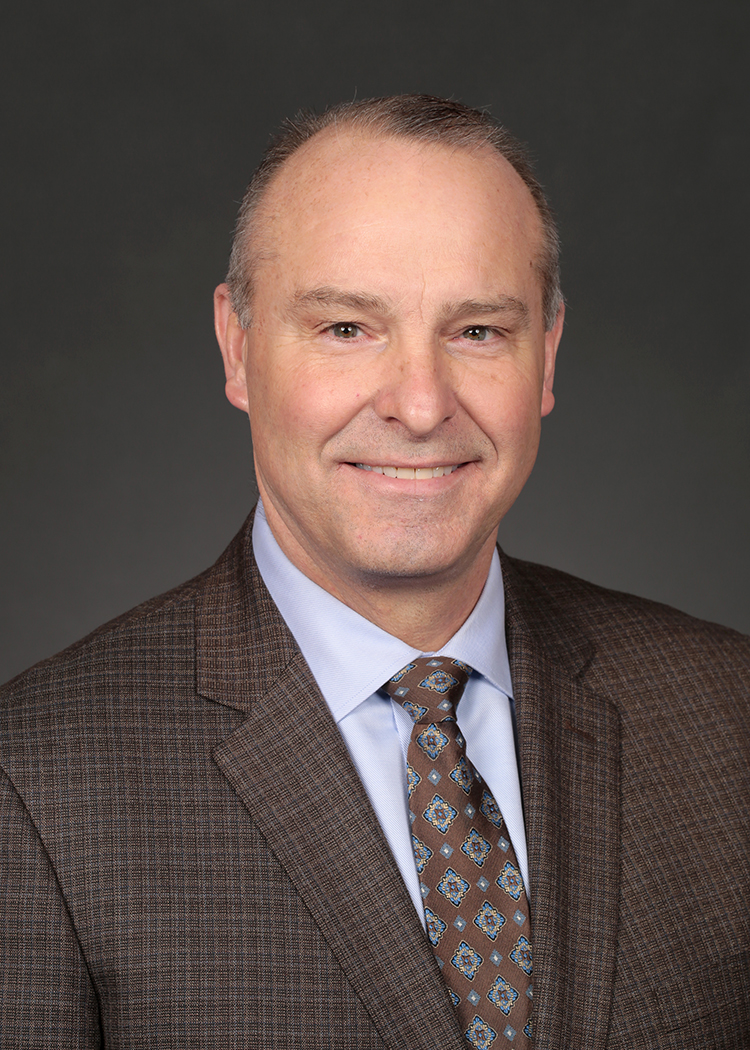

Member of the Iowa Senate from the 4th district
- Incumbent
- Assumed office January 9, 2015
- Preceded by: Daryl Beall
- Constituency: 4th district (2023-present); 5th district (2015–2023)

Personal details
- Born: 1959 (age 66–67) Paullina, Iowa, U.S.
- Party: Republican
- Spouse: Sally
- Children: 3
- Education: Northern State College
- Occupation: Financial Services

Tim Kraayenbrink (born 1959) is the Iowa State Senator from the 5th District. A Republican, he has served in the Iowa Senate since winning election in 2015.

Born in Paullina, Iowa, Kraayenbrink went on to attend Northern State College in South Dakota. He spent time as a teacher and football coach for the Northwest Webster School District. Later he started his own financial firm which he had led for over 25 years before he decided to run for public office. He currently resides in Fort Dodge with his wife Sally. They have three children and six grandchildren.

As of February 2020, Kraayenbrink serves on the following committees: Appropriations (Vice Chair), Education, and Local Government. He also serves on the Education Appropriations Subcommittee (Chair), as well as the Fiscal Committee, School Finance Formula Review Committee, Career and Technical Education Implementation Study Committee, and the College Student Aid Commission.

== Electoral history ==
Iowa Senate 5th District election, 2014
Party	Candidate	Votes	%
Republican	Tim Kraayenbrink	12,383	55.8
Democratic	Daryl Beall	9,801	44.2%
Republican gain from Democratic			

Iowa Senate 5th District election, 2018
Party	Candidate	Votes	%
Republican	Tim Kraayenbrink	14,571	61.9%
Democratic	John O'Brien	8,935	38.0%
Republican hold			

Iowa Senate
Preceded by Dennis Guth	4th District; 2023 – present	Succeeded by Incumbent
Preceded by Daryl Beall	5th District; 2015 – 2023 present	Succeeded by Dave Rowley
