= Polly Bukta =

American politician (born 1937)

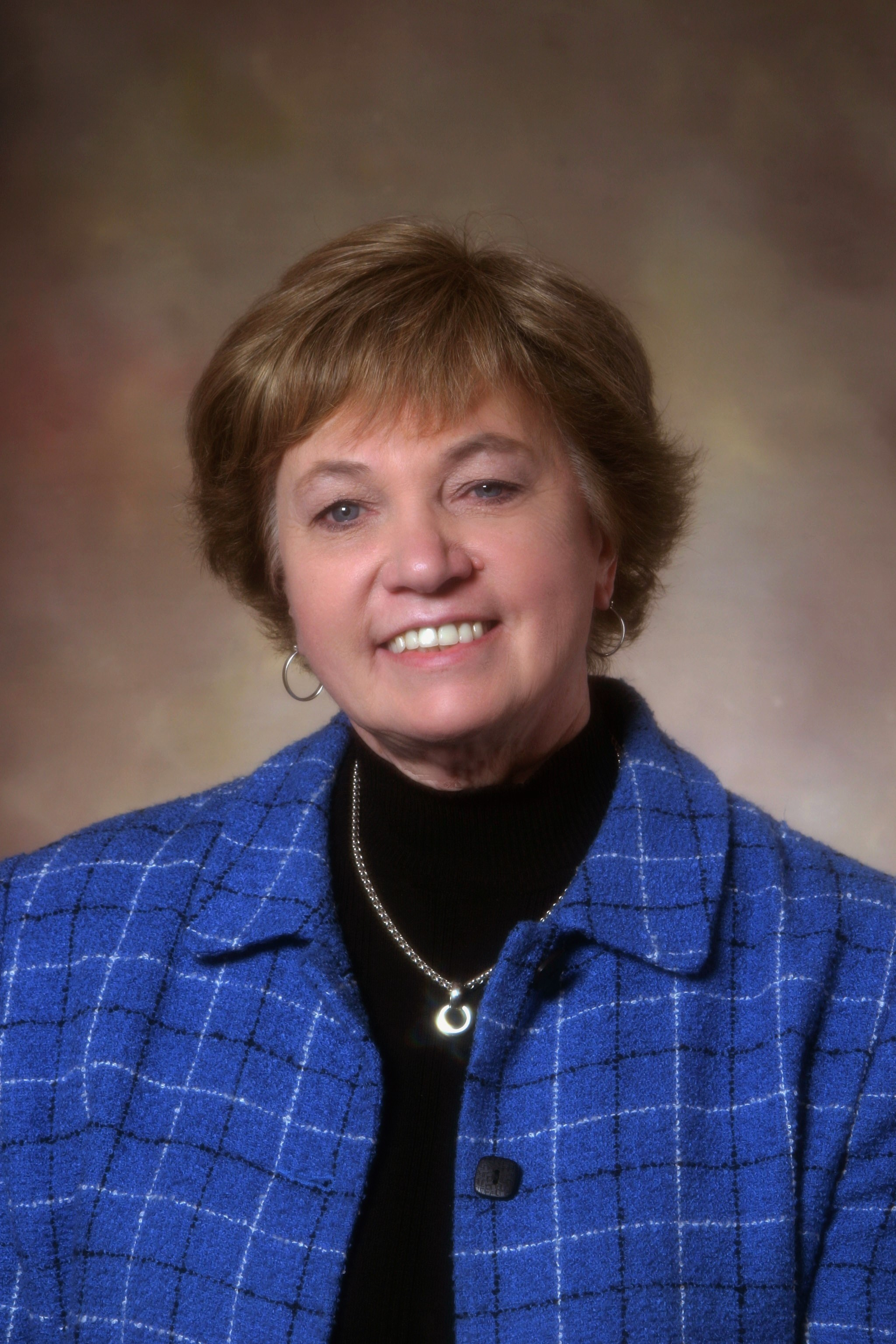

Member of the Iowa House of Representatives from the 26th district 38th (1997-2003)
- Incumbent
- Assumed office January 13, 1997
- Preceded by: Arthur Ollie

Personal details
- Born: April 3, 1937 (age 89) Greenville, Pennsylvania, U.S.
- Party: Democratic
- Spouse: Michael
- Website: Bukta's website

Polly Bukta (born April 3, 1937) is the Iowa State Representative from the 26th District and is the Speaker Pro Tempore. She has served in the Iowa House of Representatives since 1997. She received her BS from Mercyhurst University.

Bukta currently serves on several committees in the Iowa House - the Education committee; the Local Government committee; the Transportation committee; and the Veterans Affairs committee. Her political experience includes serving as vice-chair of the Clinton County Democrats.

Bukta was re-elected in 2006 with 5,536 votes (60%), defeating Republican opponent Lester A. Shields.

Iowa House of Representatives
Preceded by Arthur Ollie	38th District; 1997 – 2003	Succeeded by Robert Hogg
Preceded by Bill Dotzler	26th District; 2003 – present	Succeeded by Incumbent
