= Zach Whiting =

American politician

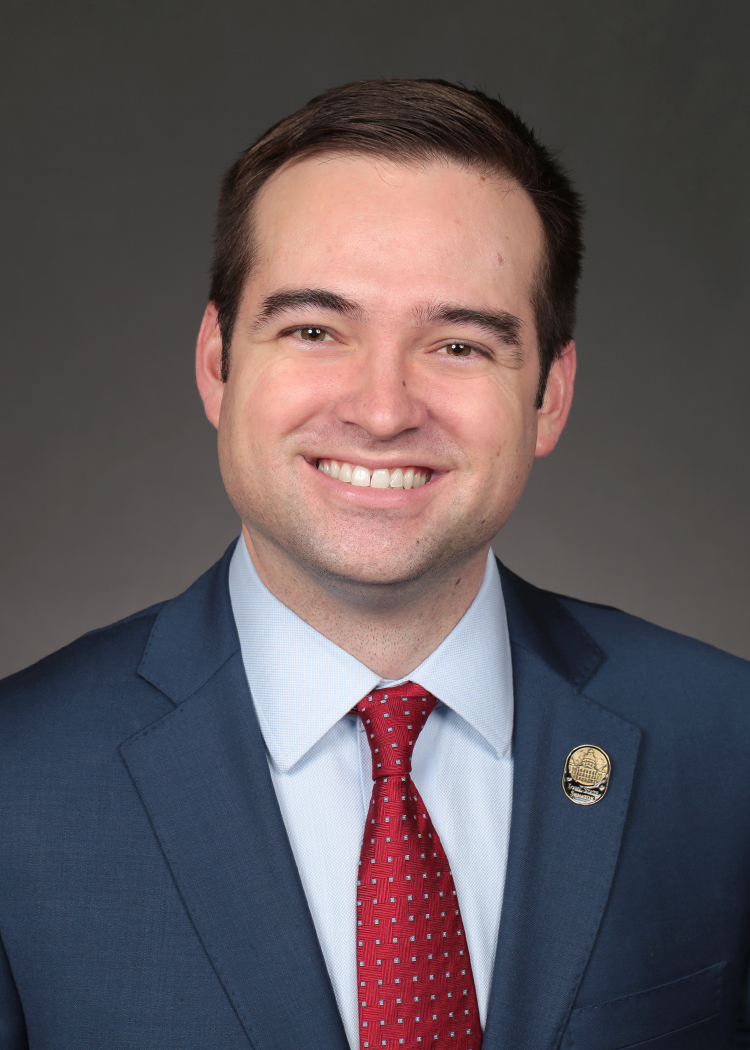

Member of the Iowa Senate from the 1st district
- In office January 14, 2019 – October 30, 2021
- Preceded by: David Johnson
- Succeeded by: Dave Rowley

Personal details
- Born: December 17, 1987 (age 38) Spirit Lake, Iowa
- Party: Republican
- Spouse: Juliana
- Children: 2
- Education: Stetson University; Regent University (JD)

Zach Whiting (born December 17, 1987) is an American politician and policy analyst. A Republican, he served in the Iowa Senate from 2019–2021 before resigning to take a job at the Texas Public Policy Foundation.

== Political career ==
Whiting served on the following committees: Labor and Business Relations (Vice Chair), Government Oversight, Judiciary, State Government, and Transportation. He also served on the Administration and Regulation Appropriations Subcommittee, as well as the Administrative Rules Review Committee, Tax Credit Review Committee, and the Human Rights Board. On October 30, 2021, Whiting resigned from the State Senate, stating that his family would soon move to Texas.

Whiting was elected in 2018 with 21,245 votes, running unopposed in the general election. He won the Republican primary with 62.4% of the vote.

In October 2021, Whiting resigned from his position in the legislature to work at the Texas Public Policy Foundation. His term was completed by Republican Dave Rowley after a November 2021 special election was held.
