= Hardin Township, Webster County, Iowa =

Coordinates: 42.62°N 94.14°W

Hardin Township
- Township
- Country: United States
- State: Iowa
- County: Webster County
- Established: August 1853
- Named for: Joseph Hardin
- Time zone: UTC-6 (CST)
  - Summer (DST): UTC-5 (CDT)

Hardin Township is a township in Webster County, Iowa.
