= Roger Stewart =

American politician

Roger Tabor Stewart
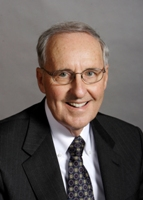

Member of the Iowa Senate from the 13th district
- In office January 13, 2003 – January 9, 2011
- Preceded by: Patricia Harper
- Succeeded by: Tod Bowman

Personal details
- Born: October 4, 1931 (age 95) Milwaukee, Wisconsin
- Party: Democrat
- Spouse: Jennie
- Children: 3 children
- Education: Wisconsin School of Banking; Cornell College
- Occupation: Banker, Farmer
- Website: Stewart's website

Roger Tabor Stewart (born October 4, 1931) is an American politician in the state of Iowa. A Democrat, he served in the Iowa Senate for the 13th district between 2003 and 2011.

Stewart served on several committees in the Iowa Senate: the Commerce committee; the Environment and Energy Independence committee; the Rebuild Iowa committee; the Ways and Means committee; and the Economic Growth committee, where he was the chair.

Stewart was re-elected in 2006 with 12,886 votes (65%), defeating Republican opponent Lametta K. Wynn.

Iowa Senate
Preceded by Patricia Harper	13th District; 2003 – 2011	Succeeded by Tod Bowman
