= Rob Hogg =

American politician (born 1967)

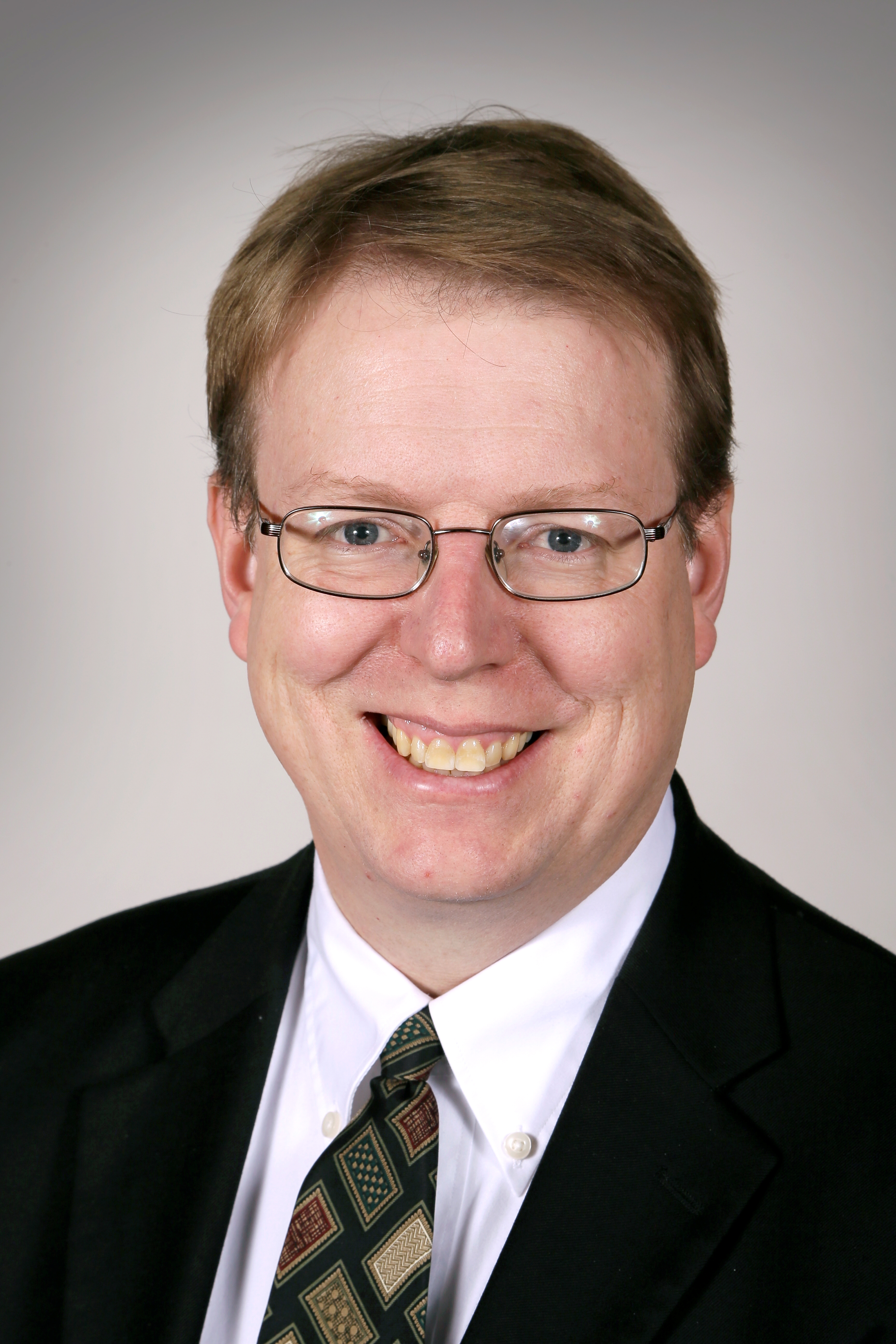
- Official portrait, 2015

Member of the Iowa Senate from the 33rd district
- In office January 8, 2007 – January 9, 2023
- Preceded by: Chuck Larson
- Succeeded by: Jack Whitver

Member of the Iowa House of Representatives from the 38th district
- In office January 13, 2003 – January 8, 2007
- Preceded by: Polly Bukta
- Succeeded by: Tyler Olson

Personal details
- Born: Robert Mason Hogg; January 24, 1967 (age 59) Iowa City, U.S.
- Party: Democratic
- Spouse: Kate Hogg
- Children: Robert Hogg (b. 1993); Dorothy Hogg; Luke Hogg; Isabel Hogg
- Education: University of Iowa; University of Minnesota
- Occupation: Attorney
- Website: Rob Hogg for US Senate

Robert Mason Hogg (born January 24, 1967) is an American politician who served in the Iowa Senate from 2007 to 2023 representing the 33rd district. A Democrat, he previously served in the Iowa House of Representatives from 2003 to 2007. He ran in the Democratic primary for the 2016 United States Senate election in Iowa, but he lost to former lieutenant governor Patty Judge.

== Background ==
Hogg was born in Iowa City in 1967, the son of Robert (Bob) and Carol Ladd Hogg. He received his B.A. from the University of Iowa and his J.D. and M.A. from the University of Minnesota.

== Political career ==
=== State legislature ===
Hogg is on Iowa Senate's Appropriations committee; the Ways and Means committee; the Environment & Energy Independence committee, where he is vice chair; the Judiciary committee, where he is vice chair; and the Rebuild Iowa committee, where he is chair. He is also vice chair of the Justice System Appropriations Subcommittee. As of February 2011, he was the only lawyer in the Iowa Senate.

Hogg was elected in 2006 with 14,112 votes (59%), defeating Republican opponent Renee Schulte. He was reelected in 2010 and 2014.

Hogg was minority leader of the Iowa Senate for a little less than a year. He was replaced by Janet Petersen in 2017.

=== U.S. Senate campaign ===
On July 8, 2014, Hogg announced that he had formed a committee to explore a potential run for United States Senate in 2016 against Republican incumbent Chuck Grassley. Later in 2015, Hogg announced his candidacy. Hogg received the endorsement of over 60 state lawmakers, including Iowa Senate President Pam Jochum and Senate Majority Leader Michael Gronstal. However, he lost the primary election to Patty Judge, who ultimately lost the general election to incumbent Senator Chuck Grassley.

=== Book ===
In 2013, Robb published America's Climate Century: What Climate Change Means for America in the 21st Century, a self-published book about the challenges society is confronting in the face of a changing climate.

Iowa House of Representatives
Preceded by Polly Bukta	38th District; 2003 – 2007	Succeeded by Tyler Olson
Iowa Senate
Preceded by Chuck Larson	19th District; 2007 – 2023	Succeeded by Jack Whitver
