= Greg Stevens (Iowa politician) =

American politician

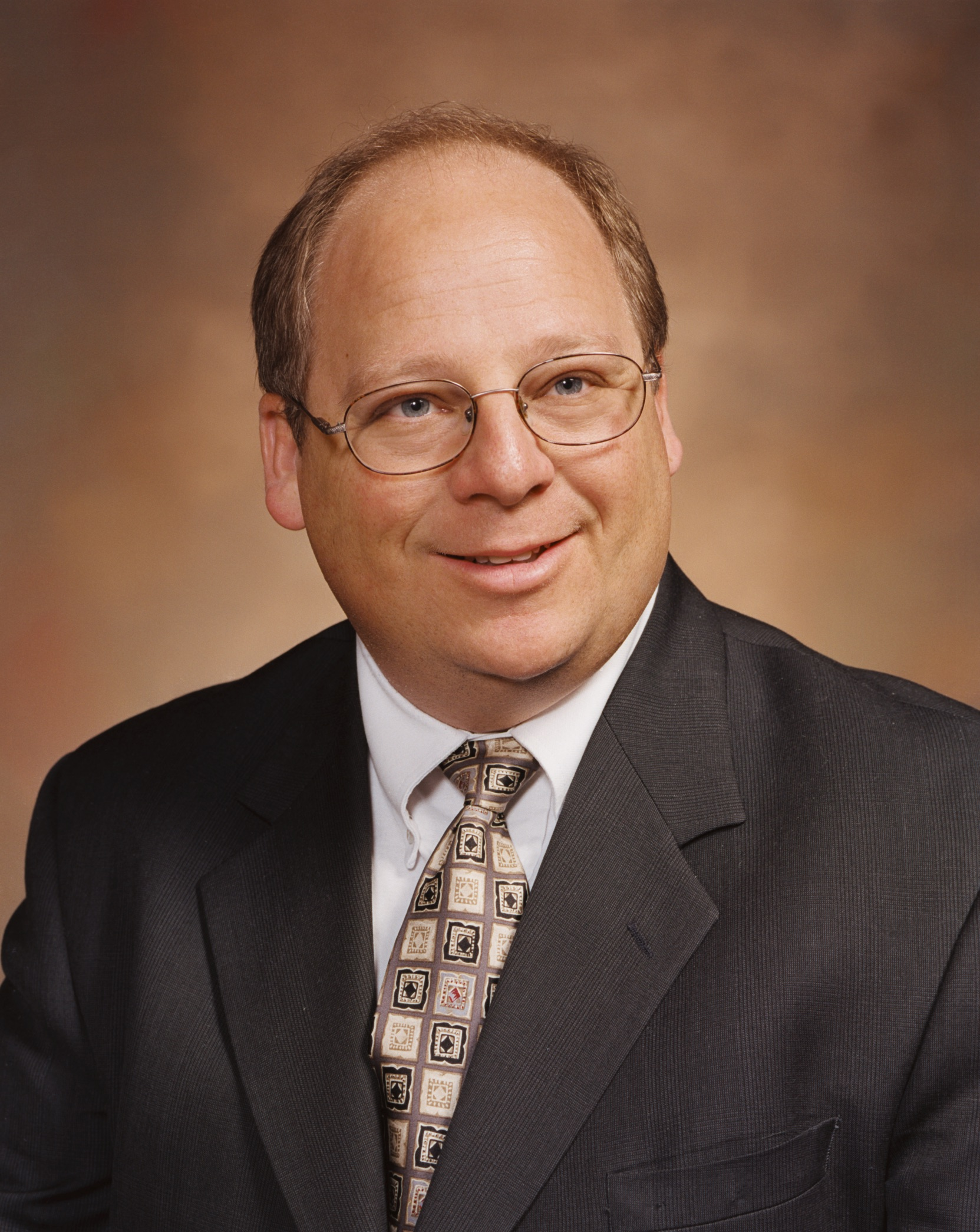

Member of the Iowa House of Representatives
- In office January 11, 1999 – January 9, 2005

Personal details
- Born: March 23, 1960 (age 66) Estherville, Iowa, United States
- Party: Democrat
- Spouse: Laura
- Children: two
- Occupation: teacher

Greg R. Stevens (born March 23, 1960) is an American politician in the state of Iowa.

Stevens was born in Estherville, Iowa. He attended Iowa Lakes Community College, the University of South Dakota, and Minnesota State University, Mankato and is a teacher. A Democrat, he served in the Iowa House of Representatives from 1999 to 2005 (7th district 1999 to 2003 and 6th district 2003 to 2005).He later went on to be an assistant Speech and Debate coach at Puyallup High School in Washington state.
