= Russell Teig =

American politician (born 1957)

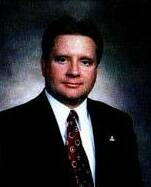

Member of the Iowa House of Representatives
- In office January 9, 1995 – January 12, 2003

Personal details
- Born: April 11, 1957 (age 69) Webster City, Iowa, U.S.
- Party: Republican
- Spouse: Sandy
- Children: 1

Russell W. Teig (born April 11, 1957) is an American politician in the state of Iowa.

Teig was born in Webster City, Iowa and attended the Iowa State University. A Republican, he served in the Iowa House of Representatives from 1995 to 2003 (17th district)
