= Robert Bacon (Iowa politician) =

American politician (born 1955)

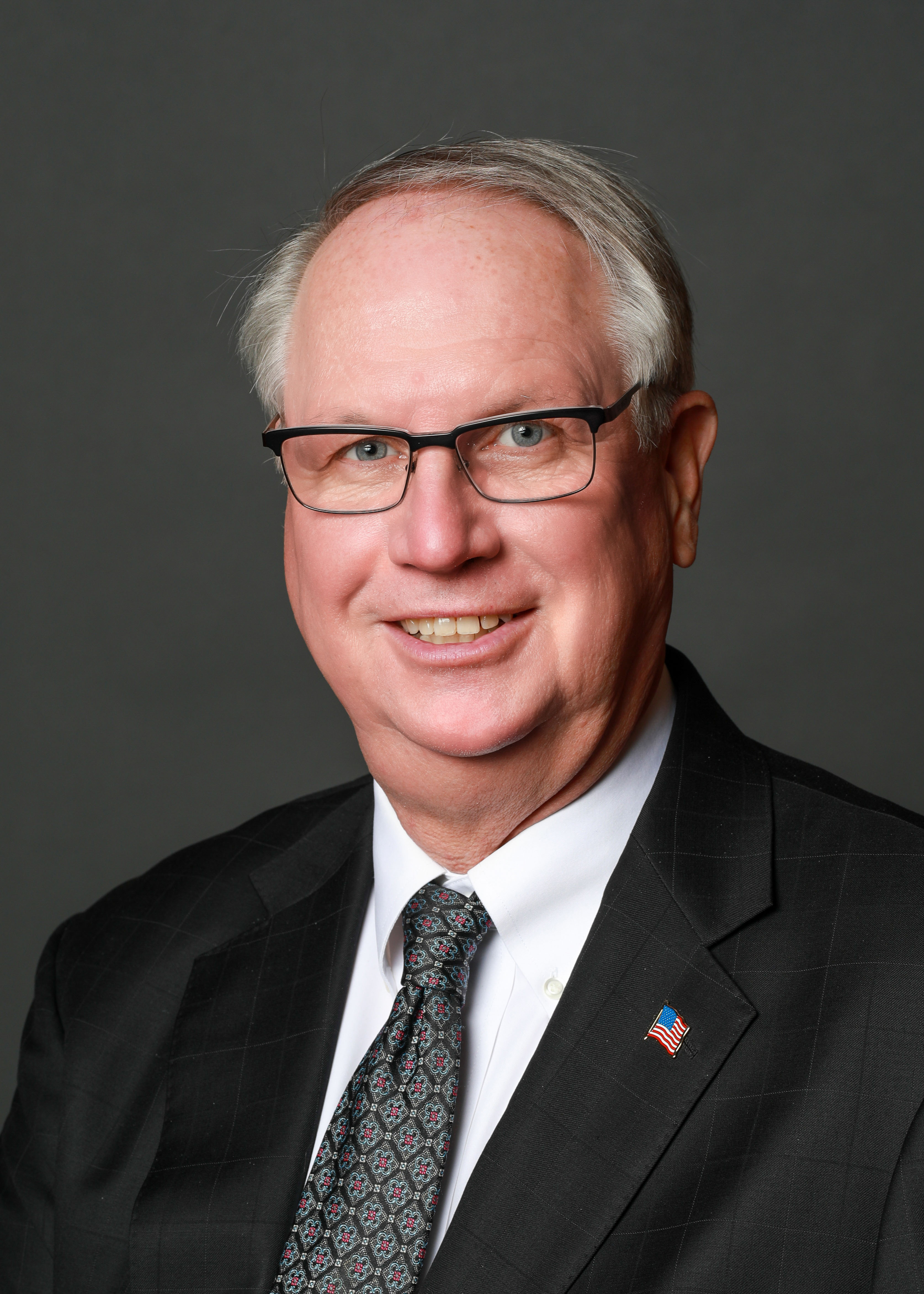

Member of the Iowa House of Representatives from the 48th district
- In office January 14, 2013 – January 9, 2023
- Preceded by: Chip Baltimore
- Succeeded by: Phil Thompson (redistricting)

Member of the Iowa Senate from the 5th district
- In office January 10, 2011 – January 13, 2013
- Preceded by: Rich Olive
- Succeeded by: Daryl Beall

Personal details
- Born: 1955 (age 70–71) Chicago, Illinois, U.S.
- Party: Republican
- Occupation: Funeral director, Legislator
- Website: legis.iowa.gov/...

Robert P. "Rob" Bacon (born 1955) is a Republican politician and former legislator from the state of Iowa. He was elected to the Iowa House of Representatives in 2012 to represent the 48th district. He was previously elected to the Iowa Senate in 2010 to represent District 5, which serves Wright, Hamilton, and Story Counties. Bacon was born in Chicago and his hometown is Maxwell, Iowa.

== Current legislative committees ==
Bacon has been a member of the following legislative committees:

- Economic Growth/Rebuild Iowa, Member
- Human Resources, Member
- Local Government, Member
- Subcommittee on Health and Human Services (Joint Appropriations), Member
- Veterans Affairs, Member

== Political experience ==
Bacon has had the following political experience:

- Representative, Iowa State House of Representatives, 2013–present
- Senator, Iowa State Senate, 2011–2013
- City Council member, Freemont
- City Council member, Maxwell

== Professional experience ==
Bacon is a licensed funeral director, and has been managing funeral homes since 1983. He is the owner of Bacon Funeral Homes.

== Personal life ==
Bacon's wife is Carol. They have four children.
