= Robert H. Renken =

American politician (1921–2018)

Member of the Iowa House of Representatives
- In office 1979–1997

Personal details
- Born: September 25, 1921 Grundy County, Iowa, U.S.
- Died: December 29, 2018 (aged 97) Grundy Center, Iowa, U.S.
- Party: Republican
- Occupation: farmer

Robert Harold Renken (September 25, 1921 – December 29, 2018) was an American politician in the state of Iowa. Renken was born in Grundy County, Iowa. He was a livestock and grain farmer. He served in the Iowa House of Representatives from 1979 to 1997, as a Republican.
