= Arthur Ollie =

American politician (1941–2025)

C. Arthur Ollie

Member of the Iowa House of Representatives
- In office January 10, 1983 – January 12, 1997

Personal details
- Born: Clifford Arthur Ollie; September 19, 1941 New York Mills, Minnesota, U.S.
- Died: June 19, 2025 (aged 83) Clinton, Iowa, U.S.
- Party: Democratic
- Occupation: Politician, teacher

Clifford Arthur Ollie (September 19, 1941 – June 19, 2025) was an American politician in the state of Iowa.

== Life and career ==
Ollie was born in New York Mills, Minnesota on September 19, 1941. He attended Suomi College, Concordia College, as well as the University of Iowa and was a teacher. He served in the Iowa House of Representatives from 1983 to 1997, as a Democrat.

Ollie died June 19, 2025, at the age of 83.
