= Daryl Beall =

American politician

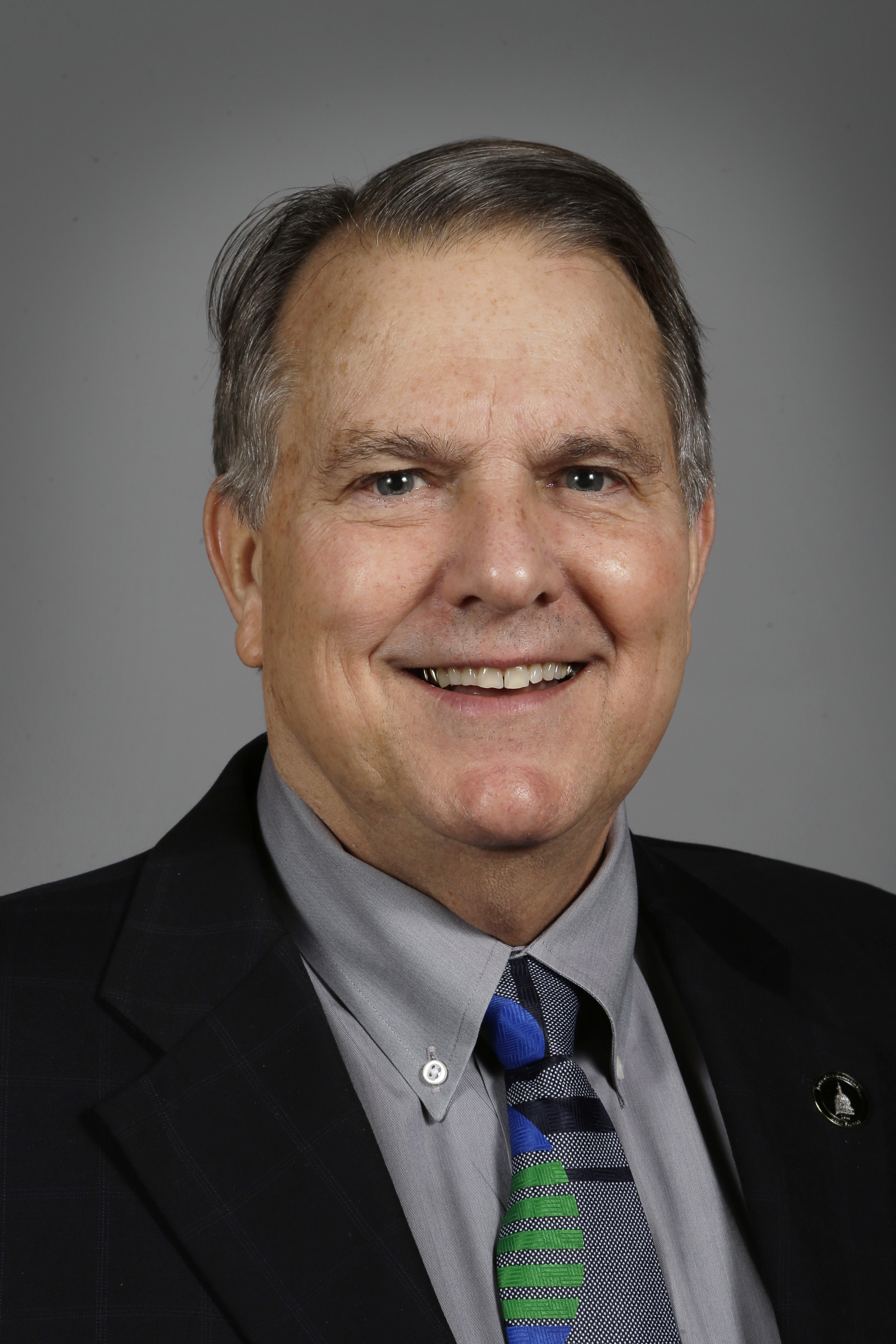

Member of the Iowa Senate from the 5th district
- In office January 13, 2003 – January 11, 2015
- Preceded by: Robert Dvorsky
- Succeeded by: Tim Kraayenbrink

Personal details
- Born: December 11, 1946 (age 79) Fort Dodge, Iowa, U.S.
- Party: Democratic
- Spouse: JoAnn
- Children: Three
- Education: Iowa Central Community College (AA); Buena Vista University (BA); Drake University (MPA)
- Occupation: Journalist
- Website: Beall's website

Daryl Beall (born December 11, 1946) is an American politician. He was the Iowa State Senator from the 5th District. A Democrat, he served in the Iowa Senate from 2003 to 2015, in Iowa Senate district 25 before Iowa's 2012 redistricting. He received his A.A. from Iowa Central Community College, his B.A. from Buena Vista University, and his MPA from Drake University.

Beall served on several committees in the Iowa Senate - the Economic Growth committee; the Education committee; the Local Government committee, where he is vice chair; the Transportation committee, where he is vice chair; and the Veterans Affairs committee, where he is chair. He also serves on the Transportation, Infrastructure, and Capitals Appropriations Subcommittee.

Beall was re-elected in 2006 with 13,032 votes (66%), defeating Republican opponent Tom Sooter.

On November 4, 2014, Beall was defeated by Republican Tim Kraayenbrink, 12,383 votes (55.8%) to 9801 votes (44.2%).

Beall's 2014 election loss came after being placed into a newly redrawn state senate district centered on his home town of Fort Dodge after the 2012 LSA legislative redistricting. The redistricting rules effectively removed his previous Senate 25 district's voting majority Democratic constituency in eastern Webster and all of Greene county. They were replaced with the larger Republican-majority counties of Pocahantas and Humboldt north of Fort Dodge, and Webster County to population balance the new Senate District 5, in which he had to run his re-election campaign.

Iowa Senate
Preceded by Robert Dvorsky	25th District; January 13, 2003 – January 13, 2013	Succeeded by Bill Dix
Preceded by Robert Bacon	5th District; January 14, 2013 – January 11, 2015	Succeeded by Tim Kraayenbrink
