= LaMetta Wynn =

American politician (1933–2021)

Mayor of Clinton, Iowa
- In office 1995–2007

Personal details
- Born: LaMetta Karen Johnson; August 4, 1933 Galena, Illinois, U.S.
- Died: June 24, 2021 (aged 87)
- Cause of death: Alzheimer's disease
- Party: Republican
- Spouse: Thomas Wynn Sr.
- Children: 10
- Parent(s): Garrett Dey Johnson; Mossie Lee Clark
- Education: Galena High School
- Profession: Politician

LaMetta Wynn (August 4, 1933 – June 24, 2021) was the mayor of Clinton, Iowa from 1995 to 2007. She was the first African-American woman to hold the position of mayor in any Iowa municipality.

Wynn has 10 children and worked for 30 years as a registered nurse. She graduated from Galena High School in Galena, Illinois. Prior to becoming mayor, Wynn served 12 years on the Clinton School Board.

On January 26, 2006, Wynn announced her candidacy for the Iowa Senate, District 13 as a Republican, but lost the election to incumbent Democrat Roger Stewart.
