= Iowa's 23rd Senate district =

American legislative district

Senate District 23
- Type: District of the Upper House
- Location: Central Iowa
- Senator: Jack Whitver (R)
- Parent organization: Iowa General Assembly

The 23rd District of the Iowa Senate is located in central Iowa, and is currently composed of part of Dallas and Polk counties.

== Current elected officials ==
Jack Whitver is the senator currently representing the 23rd District.

The area of the 23rd District contains two Iowa House of Representatives districts:

- The 45th District (represented by Brian Lohse)
- The 46th District (represented by Dan Gehlbach)

The district is also located in Iowa's 3rd congressional district, which is represented by Zach Nunn.

== Past senators ==
The district has previously been represented by:

- Kenneth Benda, 1963–1967
- C. Joseph Coleman, 1973–1983
- Arthur Small, 1983–1986
- Jean Hall Lloyd-Jones, 1987–1994
- Mary Neuhauser, 1995–1998
- Joe Bolkcom, 1999–2002
- Herman Quirmbach, 2003–2020
- Jack Whitver, 2020–2027
- Wes Enos, 2027–present

== Recent election results from statewide races ==
Year	Office	Results
2008	President	McCain 54–44%
2012	President	Romney 58–42%
2016	President	Trump 56–36%
2016	Senate	Grassley 67–29%
2018	Governor	Reynolds 55–43%
2018	Attorney General	Miller 72–28%
2018	Secretary of State	Pate 57–40%
2018	Treasurer	Fitzgerald 53–45%
2018	Auditor	Mosiman 52–46%
2020	President	Trump 56–42%
2020	Senate	Ernst 56–41%
2022	Senate	Grassley 58–41%
2022	Governor	Reynolds 60–38%
2022	Attorney General	Bird 52–47%
2022	Secretary of State	Pate 64–36%
2022	Treasurer	Smith 52–48%
2022	Auditor	Halbur 51–49%
2024	President	Trump 57–41%

== See also ==
- Iowa General Assembly
- Iowa Senate
