= David Johnson (Iowa politician) =

American politician (born 1950)

David J. Johnson
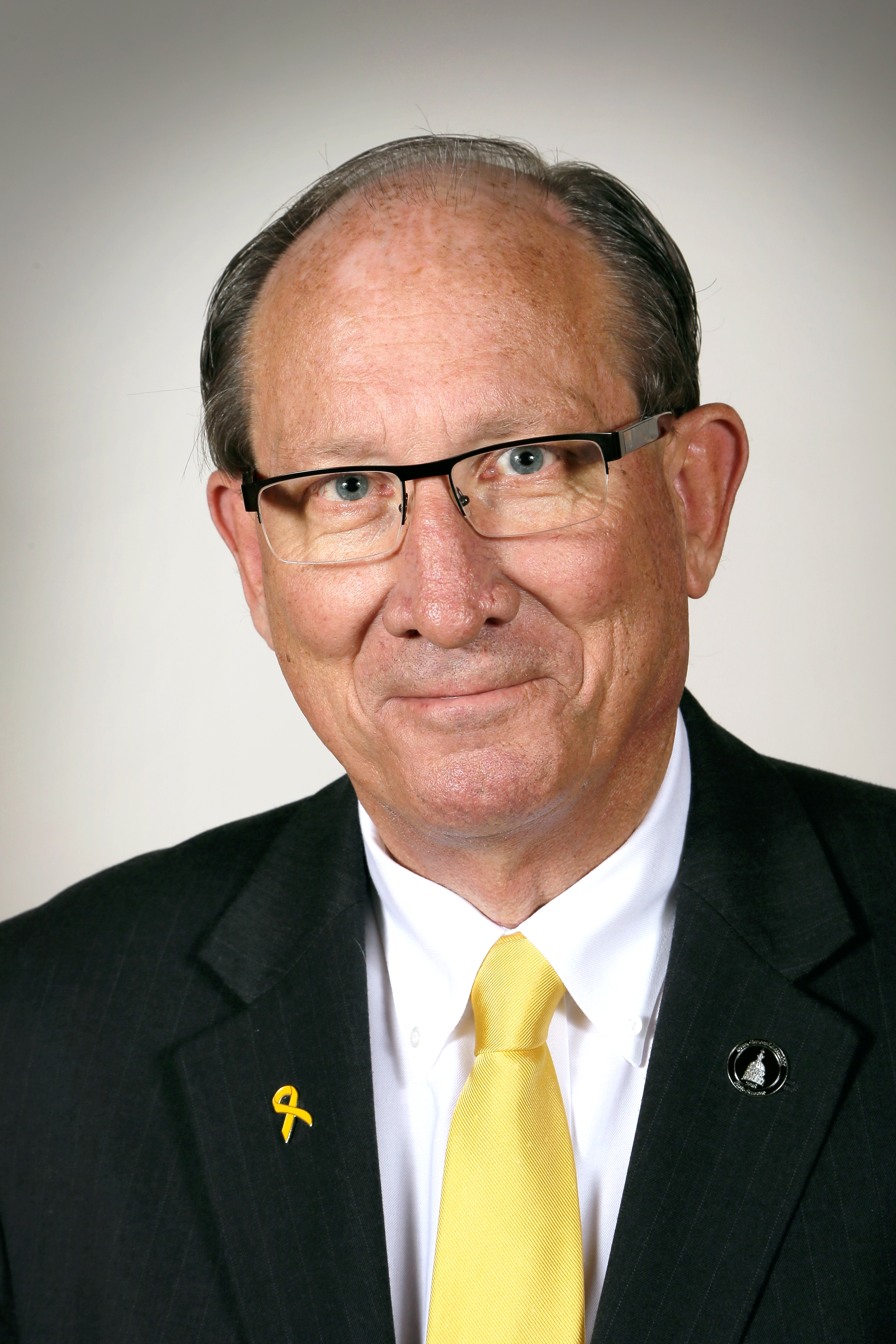

Member of the Iowa Senate
- In office January 13, 2003 – January 7, 2019
- Preceded by: Kenneth Veenstra
- Succeeded by: Zach Whiting
- Constituency: 3rd district (2003–2011); 1st district (2011–2019)

Member of the Iowa House of Representatives from the 6th district
- In office January 13, 1997 – January 13, 2003
- Preceded by: Richard Vande Hoef
- Succeeded by: Greg Stevens

Personal details
- Born: 1950 (age 75–76) West Branch, Iowa, U.S.
- Party: Democratic (since 2019)
- Other political affiliations: Republican (until 2016); Independent (2016–2019)
- Education: Beloit College
- Occupation: Dairy farmer

David Johnson (born 1950) was the Iowa State Senator from the 1st District and served as assistant minority leader. A former Republican and current Democrat, he served in the Iowa Senate from 2003 to 2019 and served in the Iowa House of Representatives from 1999 to 2003.

Johnson served on several committees in the Iowa Senate – the Appropriations committee; the Education committee; the Human Resources committee; the Natural Resources committee; and the Agriculture committee, where he was the ranking member. He also served as the ranking member of the Health and Human Services Appropriations Subcommittee.

== 2006 election ==
In his 2006 bid for re-election, Johnson received 12,328 votes (57%), defeating Democratic opponent Mel Berryhill.

== Early life and education ==
Johnson was born and raised in West Branch, Iowa, and graduated from West Branch High School. He then went on to obtain his B.A. in history from Beloit College in Wisconsin.

== Career ==
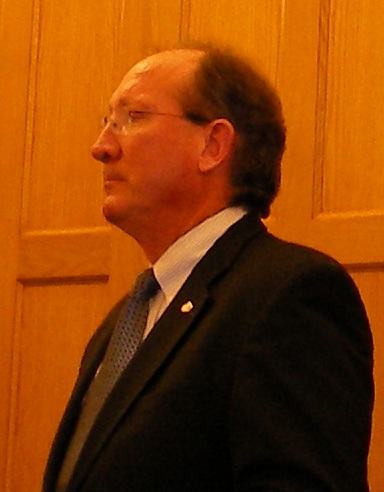
Johnson in 2008

After graduating college, he went on three scientific expeditions. For all three trips to Antarctica and the Arctic, he was the camp manager. Outside politics, Johnson works on an Osceola County dairy farm. He then went on to become a newspaper publisher and editor where he won a number of awards for his work in journalism. For several years he served as president of the Chamber of Commerce.

In July 2015, upon receiving an email from a teacher asking for him to reconsider his stance on an education vote, Senator Johnson wrote "quit whining".

In June 2016, Johnson changed his party affiliation to "No Party", citing his opposition to the Republican Party's support for U.S. presidential candidate Donald Trump. He stated, "Many of the voters who elected me are supporting Mr. Trump. I respect that, but disagree that he is qualified to lead the nation and the free world." Johnson did not run for reelection in 2018. In 2019, Johnson joined the Democratic Party.

== Awards and honors ==
Johnson has won a number of awards from the following:

- Distinguished Service Award
- Iowa Newspaper Association
- Iowa FFA and Iowa High School Football Coaches Association
- Legislator of the Year
- Iowa Izaak Walton League
- Iowa Agribusiness Association
- Iowa Biotechnology Association and Iowa Safe Kids Coalition
- Guardian of Small Business Award — National Federation of Independent Business
- Iowa Association of Municipal Utilities
- Iowa Health Care Association
- Iowa Dental Association

Iowa House of Representatives
Preceded by Richard Vande Hoef	6th district 1999–2003	Succeeded by Greg Stevens
Iowa Senate
Preceded by Kenneth Veenstra	3rd district 2003–2009	Succeeded by Zach Whiting
