= William Dotzler =

American politician

Bill Dotzler Jr.
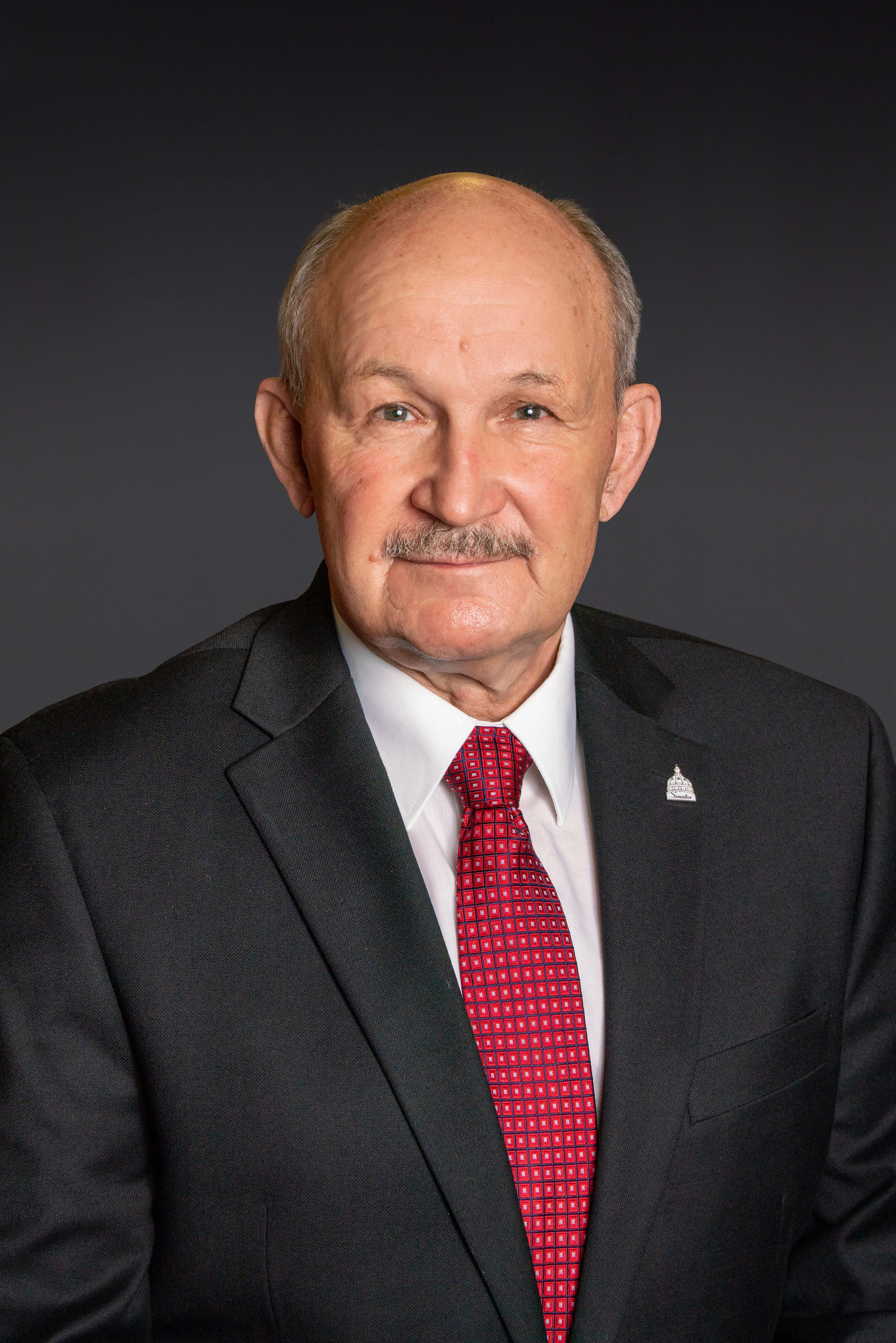

Member of the Iowa Senate from the 31st district
- Incumbent
- Assumed office January 14, 2003
- Preceded by: John W. Jensen
- Constituency: District 31 - (2013-2023); District 11 - (2003-2013)

Member of the Iowa House of Representatives from the 26th district
- In office January 13, 1997 – January 13, 2003
- Preceded by: Patricia Harper
- Succeeded by: Polly Bukta

Personal details
- Born: May 7, 1948 (age 78) Saint Paul, Minnesota, U.S.
- Party: Democratic
- Education: North Iowa Area Community College (A.A.); University of Northern Iowa (B.A.)
- Occupation: Retired - John Deere
- Website: Dotzler's website

William Anthony Dotzler Jr. (born May 7, 1948) is the Iowa State Senator from the 31st District. A Democrat, he has served in the Iowa Senate since 2003 and previously served as assistant majority leader.

== Early life and education ==
Dotzler went to Cedar Falls High School, graduating in 1966. He then received his A.A. from North Iowa Area Community College in 1969. Dotzler then served in the United States Army Office of Military Intelligence for three years, serving one tour in Germany. Upon returning, Dotzler enrolled in the University of Northern Iowa, receiving his B.A. in Biology in 1975.

== Iowa House and Senate ==
Dotzler had previously been a member of the Iowa House of Representatives, representing the 26th District from 1997 to 2003, and then was elected to the Iowa Senate in 2003, succeeding John Jensen.

Dotzler was re-elected in 2006 with 11,782 votes (70%), defeating Republican opponent Jim Buschkamp.

In 2007, Dotzler was instrumental in helping to pass tax incentives aimed at technology companies, such as Google and Microsoft, to build a facility in Iowa and invest millions of dollars in the state. The legislation gave companies tax breaks on sales tax from utility bills and property tax breaks.

Dotzler was re-elected in 2010 with 10,459 votes (59%), defeating Republican opponent Ron Welper.

More recently, Dotzler has gone on record opposing the construction of new nuclear power plants in Iowa citing cost and safety concerns.

Dotzler currently serves on several committees in the Iowa Senate - the Appropriations committee; the Economic Growth committee; the Human Resources committee; the Labor and Business Relations committee, and the Ways and Means committee. He also serves as chair of the Economic Development Appropriations Subcommittee.

Iowa Senate
Preceded by Matt McCoy	31st District; 2013 – present	Succeeded by Incumbent
Preceded by John Jensen	11th District; 2003 – 2013	Succeeded by
Iowa House of Representatives
Preceded by Patricia Harper	26th District; 1997 – 2003	Succeeded by Polly Bukta
