= Bill Heckroth =

American politician

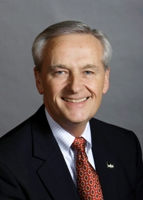

Member of the Iowa Senate from the 9th district
- In office January 8, 2007 – January 8, 2011
- Preceded by: Bob Brunkhorst
- Succeeded by: Bill Dix

Personal details
- Born: September 2, 1949 (age 77) Dysart, Iowa
- Party: Democrat
- Spouse: Jan
- Children: 3 sons
- Education: University of Iowa
- Profession: Financial Planner
- Website: Heckroth's Official profile

William Michael Heckroth (born September 2, 1949) is an American politician. He is a former Iowa State Senator from the 9th District, who as a Democrat served in the Iowa Senate from 2007 to 2011. He owns and is a financial consultant for Financial Architects.

== Early life ==
Heckroth is a graduate of the University of Iowa, earning a B.S. in Financial Management. While at Iowa, he played baseball; starting out as a walk-on to the Iowa Hawkeyes baseball team. He later earned 1st Team "All-Big Ten" honors as a pitcher in his senior year, while leading the Hawkeyes to the Big Ten Championship and a berth in the NCAA Division I College World Series in Omaha, Nebraska.

== Career ==
While serving in the Iowa Senate, Heckroth served on the Economic Growth committee; the Education committee; the Transportation committee; the Commerce Affairs committee, where he was vice chair; and the Rebuild Iowa committee, where he was vice chair. He also served as vice-chair of the Economic Development Appropriations Subcommittee.

Heckroth was elected in 2006 with 11,902 votes (52%).

Iowa Senate
Preceded by Bob Brunkhorst	9th District; 2007 – present	Succeeded by Bill Dix
