= Donald Hanson =

American politician (1926–2012)

Donald E. Hanson (April 26, 1926 – June 27, 2012) was an American politician and educator.

Hanson was born in Lyon County, Minnesota, on April 26, 1926. Upon his discharge from the United States Navy, he pursued a bachelor's degree in education at Northwest Missouri State University, completed a master of arts at the University of Wyoming, and obtained a doctorate of education at Western Michigan University. Hanson then became a schoolteacher and administrator. After retiring from teaching, Hanson served three consecutive terms on the Iowa House of Representatives. He was elected as a Republican legislator from District 26 between 1991 and 1993, and held the District 24 seat from 1993 to 1997. Hanson married his wife Jo in 1950, and raised three children.

Hanson died in Cedar Falls, Iowa on June 27, 2012, at the age of 86.
