= Keith Kreiman =

American politician

Keith A. Kreiman
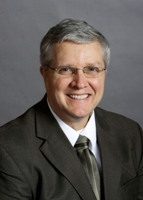

Member of the Iowa Senate
- In office January 13, 2003 – January 9, 2011

Member of the Iowa House of Representatives
- In office January 11, 1993 – January 12, 2003

Personal details
- Born: June 28, 1954 (age 72) Fargo, North Dakota
- Party: Democrat
- Spouse: Rose Ann
- Occupation: Attorney
- Website: Kreiman's website

Keith A. Kreiman (born June 28, 1954) is an American politician who served as an Iowa State Senator from the 47th District from 2003 to 2011. He received his AA from Ellsworth Community College, his BA from Seattle University, and his JD from the University of Iowa College of Law. He works as an attorney in private practice.

Kreiman served on several committees in the Iowa Senate - the Education committee; the Human Resources committee; the Local Government committee; and the Judiciary committee, where he is chair. He also served as vice chair of the Health and Human Services Appropriations Subcommittee. His prior political experience includes serving as a representative in the Iowa House from 1993 to 2003, serving on the Davis County school board from 1989 to 1993, and serving on the State Democratic Platform Committee in 1988.

Kreiman was re-elected in 2006 with 11,790 votes (64%), defeating Republican opponent Keith Caviness and Independent Max Hulen.

He was defeated in 2010 by Republican Mark Chelgren by 10 votes.

Iowa House of Representatives
Preceded by Horace Daggett	92nd district 1993–2003	Succeeded by Philip Wise
Iowa Senate
Preceded by David Miller	47th district 2003–2011	Succeeded by Mark Chelgren
