= Herman Quirmbach =

American politician

Herman C. Quirmbach
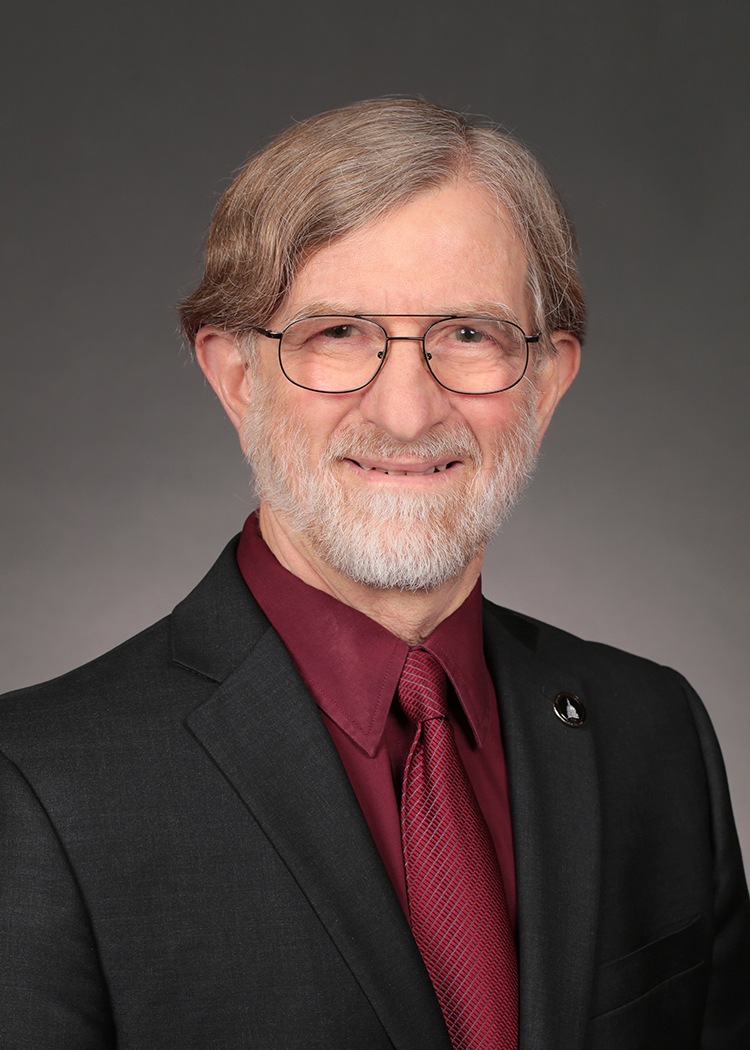

Member of the Iowa Senate from the 23rd district
- Incumbent
- Assumed office January 13, 2003
- Preceded by: Joe Bolkcom
- Constituency: District 25 - (2023-Present); District 23 - (2003-2023)

Personal details
- Born: October 6, 1950 (age 75) St. Paul, Minnesota, U.S.
- Party: Democratic
- Education: Harvard University (BA); Princeton University (MA, PhD)
- Occupation: Associate Professor of Economics
- Website: Quirmbach's website

Herman Charles Quirmbach (born October 6, 1950) is an American politician and academic. He is a member of the Iowa Senate from the 25th district. A Democrat, he has served in the Iowa Senate since 2003 and on the Ames City Council from 1995 to 2003.

== Early life ==
Quirmbach was born on October 6, 1950, in St. Paul, Minnesota. He grew up in Mahtomedi, Minnesota, and Brookfield, Wisconsin. He graduated from Central High School and then received his bachelors' of arts degree in government from Harvard University, where he roomed with future biochemist and Nobel laureate Roger Y. Tsien. He earned his master's degree and Ph.D. in economics from Princeton University, after completing a doctoral dissertation "Input prices and the horizontal and vertical structure of industry."

== Career ==
After earning his doctoral degree, Quirmbach became an associate professor of economics at Iowa State University.

Quirmbach serves on several committees in the Iowa Senate—the Education committee; the Human Resources committee; the Judiciary committee; and the Ways and Means committee; and the Local Government committee, where he is chair. He also serves as vice chair of the Education Appropriations Subcommittee.

Quirmbach was re-elected in 2006 with 11,782 votes (57%), defeating Republican opponent Linda Livingston.

Iowa Senate
Preceded by Annette Sweeney	25th District; 2023 - Present	Succeeded by Jack Whitver
Preceded by Joe Bolkcom	23rd District; 2003 - 2023	Succeeded by Incumbent
