= Rich Olive =

American politician (1949-2016)

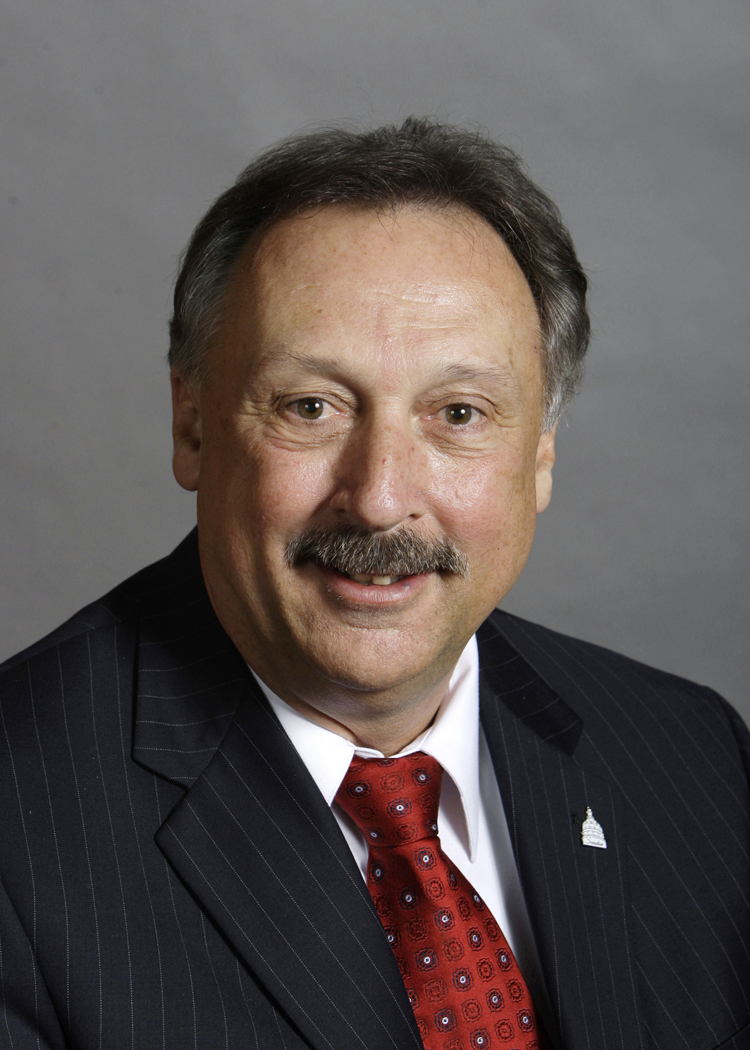

Member of the Iowa Senate from the 5th district
- In office January 8, 2007 – January 9, 2011
- Preceded by: Stewart Iverson
- Succeeded by: Robert Bacon

Personal details
- Born: Richard Warren Olive; December 2, 1949 Bethesda, Maryland
- Died: June 20, 2016 (aged 66) Story City, Iowa
- Party: Democratic
- Spouse: Marian
- Children: 3
- Profession: Real estate, Insurance, Army National Guard

Richard Warren Olive (December 2, 1949 – June 20, 2016) was an American realtor and politician from Iowa. A Democrat, he served the Fifth District in the Iowa Senate from 2007 until 2011.

Olive served on several committees in the Iowa Senate: the Commerce committee; the Agriculture committee, where he was vice chair; the Economic Growth committee, where he was vice chair; and the Government Oversight committee, where he was chair.

Olive was elected in 2006 with 11,224 votes (50%), defeating Republican opponent James Kurtenbach. In his 2010 bid for re-election, he received 10,510 votes (45%), losing to Republican opponent Robert Bacon.

He attended South Dakota State University on scholarship for both football and basketball, but dropped out to serve in the Iowa National Guard. Olive lived and worked in Story City, where he ran Norsemen Realty. He married Marian Tesdall in 1971, with whom he had three daughters. On June 20, 2016, Olive died of cancer at the age of 66.

Iowa Senate
| Preceded by Stewart Iverson | 5th District; 2007 – 2011 | Succeeded by Robert Bacon |
