= List of Nikki Haley 2024 presidential campaign endorsements =

Nikki Haley for President
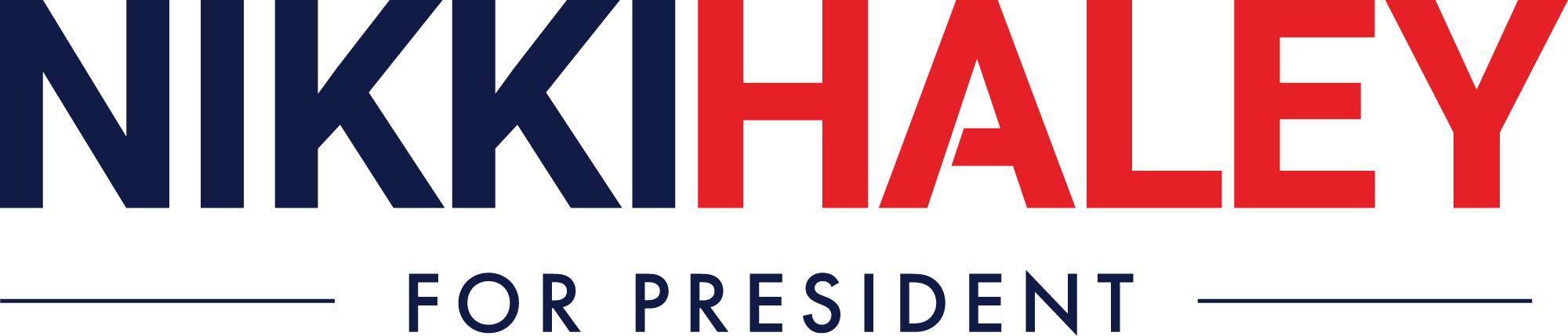
- Campaign: 2024 United States presidential election (Republican presidential primaries)
- Candidate: Nikki Haley; 29th United States ambassador to the United Nations (2017–2018); 116th governor of South Carolina (2011–2017)
- Affiliation: Republican Party
- Announced: February 14, 2023
- Suspended: March 6, 2024
- Headquarters: Charleston, South Carolina
- Slogan: Stand for America

Website
- nikkihaley.com

This is a list of notable individuals and organizations that endorsed Nikki Haley in the 2024 Republican Party primaries.

== Federal executive officials ==
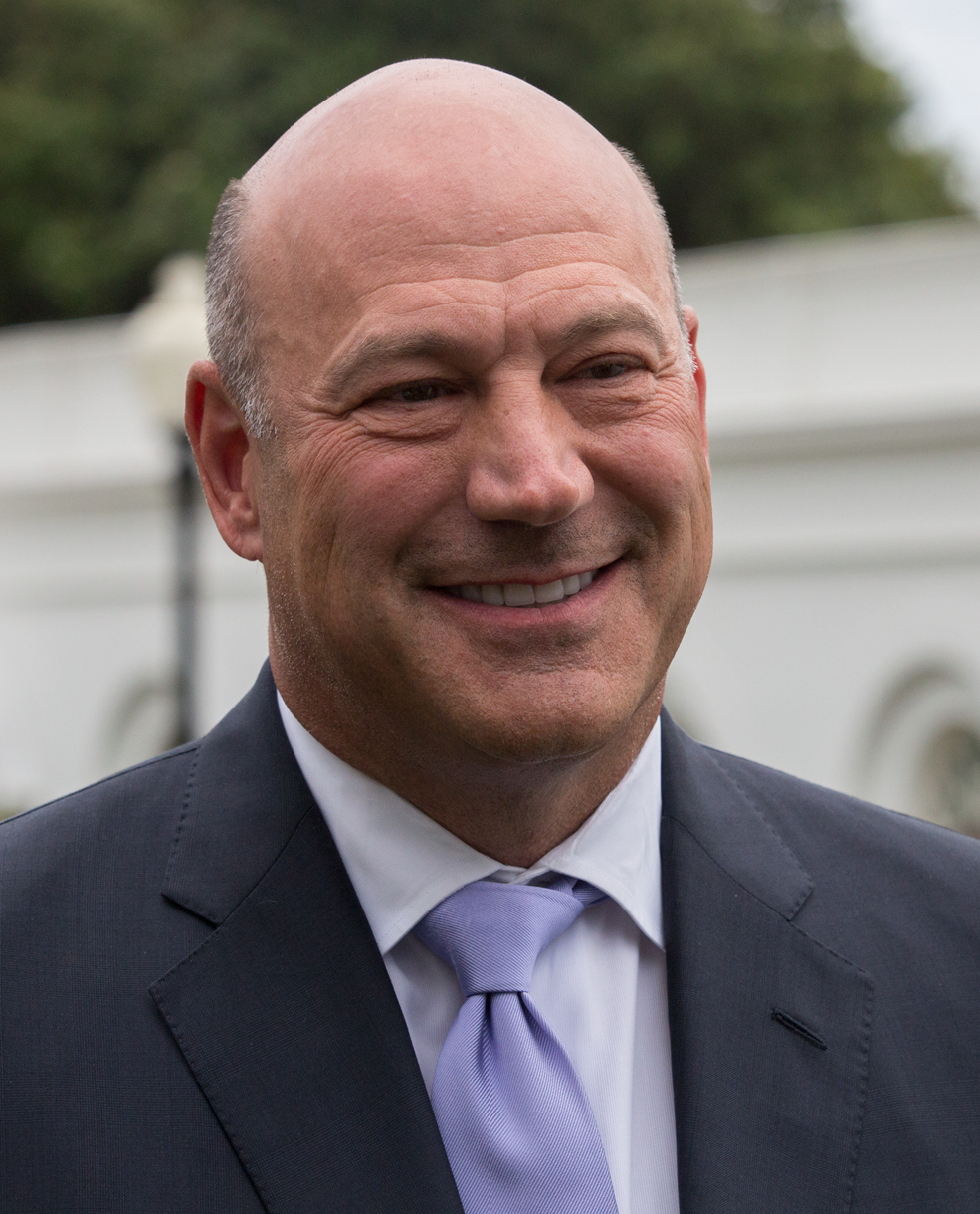
Gary Cohn

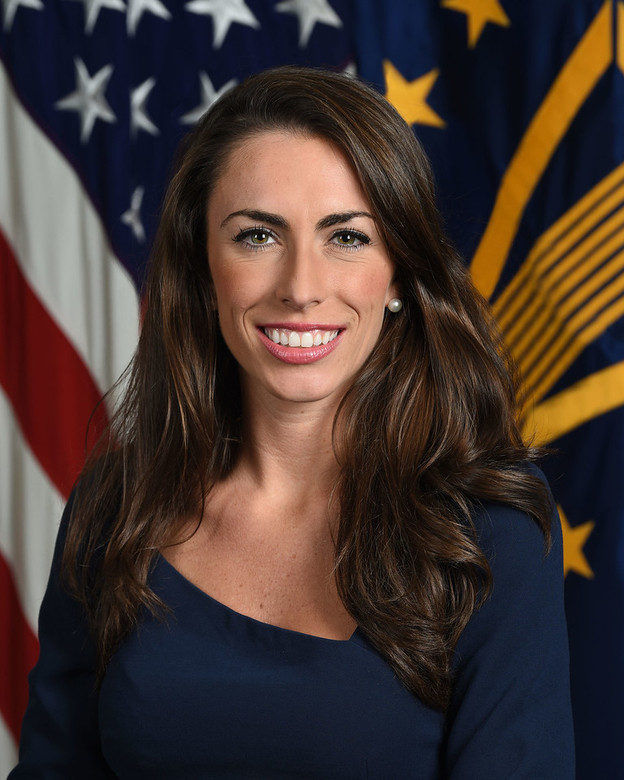
Alyssa Farah Griffin

=== Former ===
- Gary Cohn, director of the National Economic Council (2017–2018) (previously endorsed Tim Scott)
- Ashley Davis, White House deputy director of management and administration (2001–2003)
- Alyssa Farah Griffin, White House director of strategic communications (2020)
- Mary Ann Hanusa, director of the White House Office of Presidential Correspondence (2001–2006)
- Mary Kramer, U.S. ambassador to Barbados (2004–2006)
- Frank Lavin, U.S. ambassador to Singapore (2001–2005) and White House director of political affairs (1987–1989)
- Sarah Matthews, White House deputy press secretary (2020–2021)
- Harriet Miers, White House counsel (2005–2007), White House deputy chief of staff (2003–2005), and White House staff secretary (2001–2003)
- Henson Moore, White House deputy chief of staff (1992) and U.S. deputy secretary of energy (1989–1992)
- Brian T. Moran, U.S. attorney for the Western District of Washington (2019–2021)
- Jeanne Phillips, U.S. ambassador to the OECD (2001–2002)

== U.S. senators ==
=== Current ===
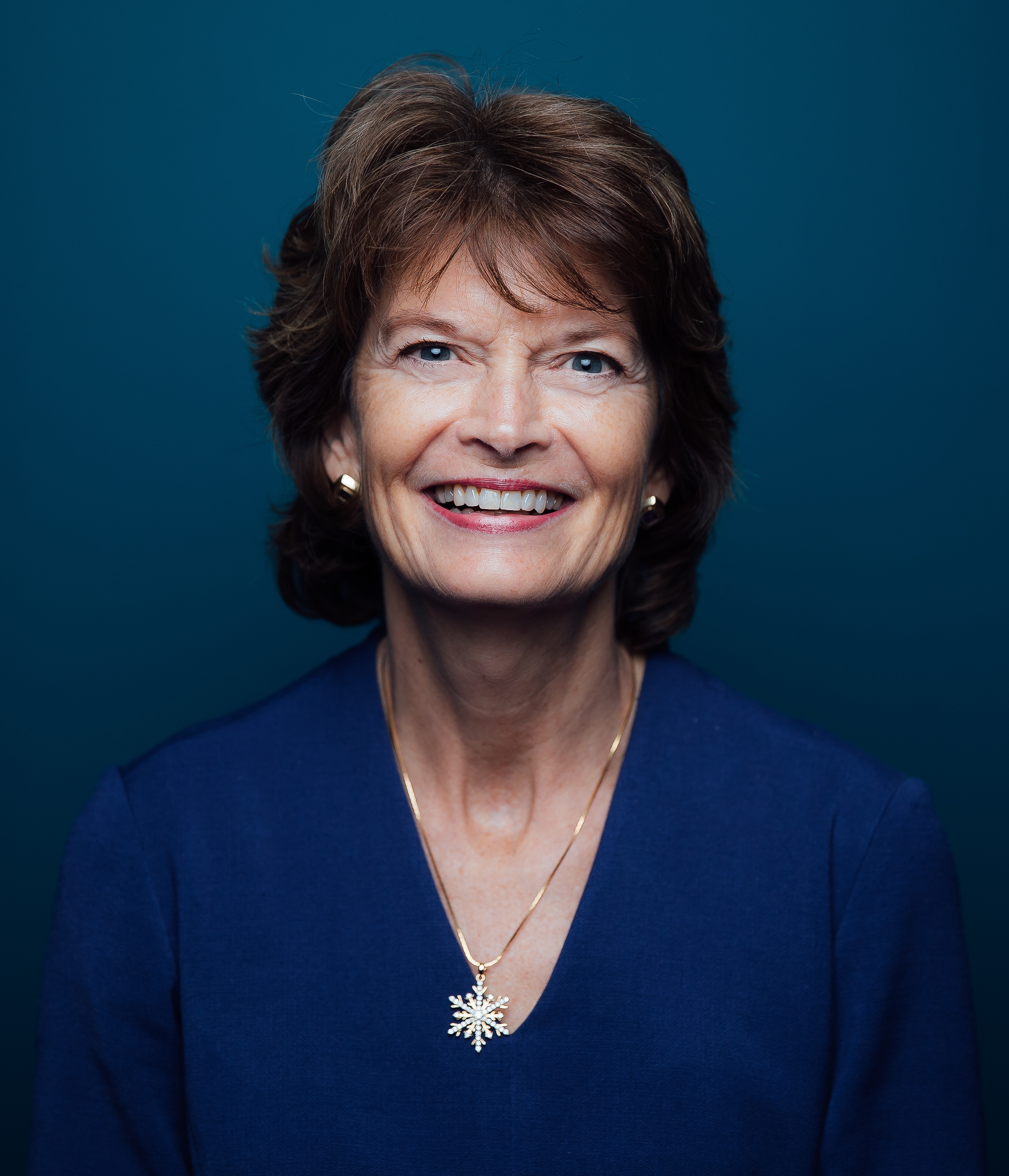
Lisa Murkowski

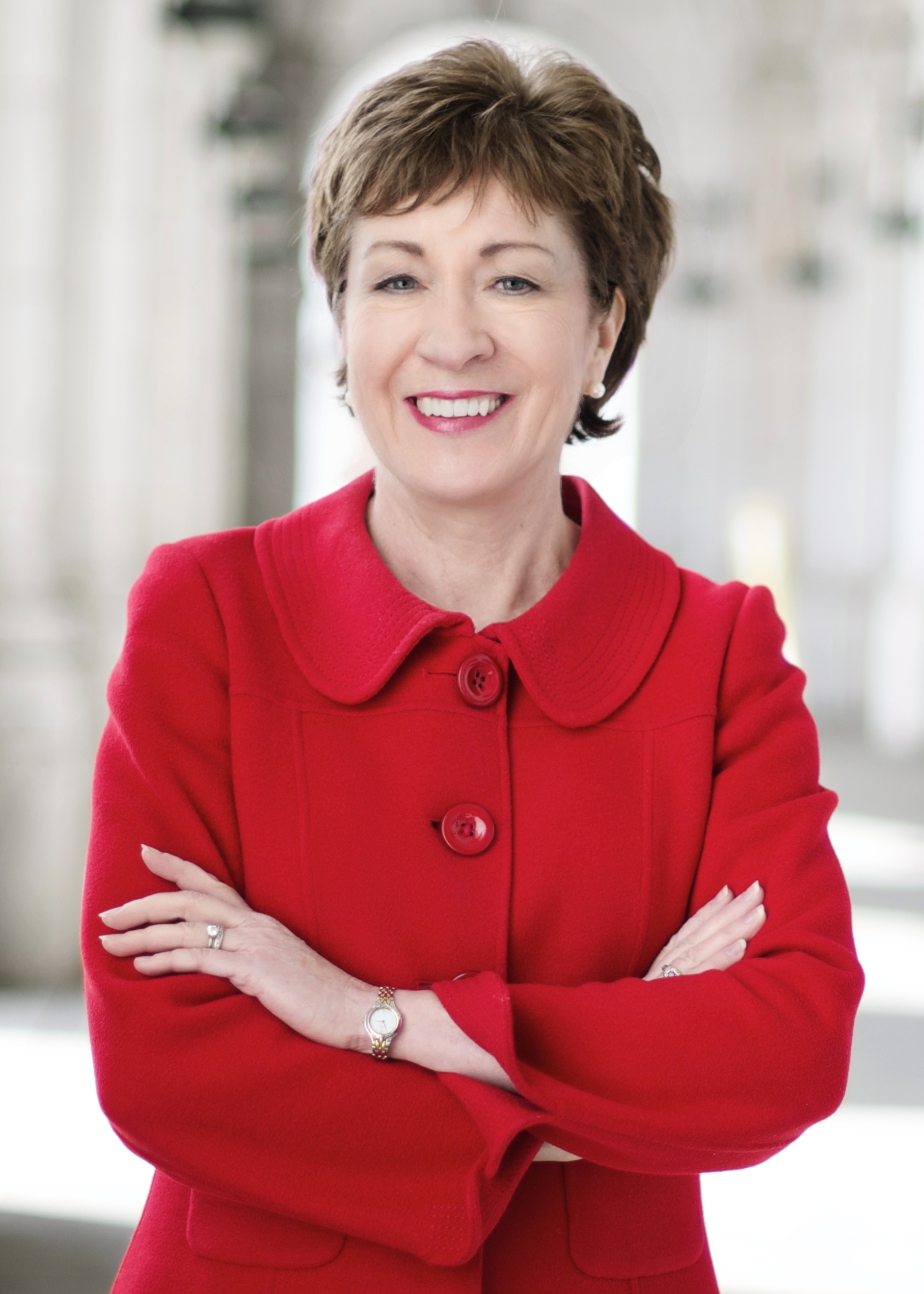
Susan Collins

- Lisa Murkowski, Alaska (2002–present)
- Susan Collins, Maine (1997–present)

=== Former ===
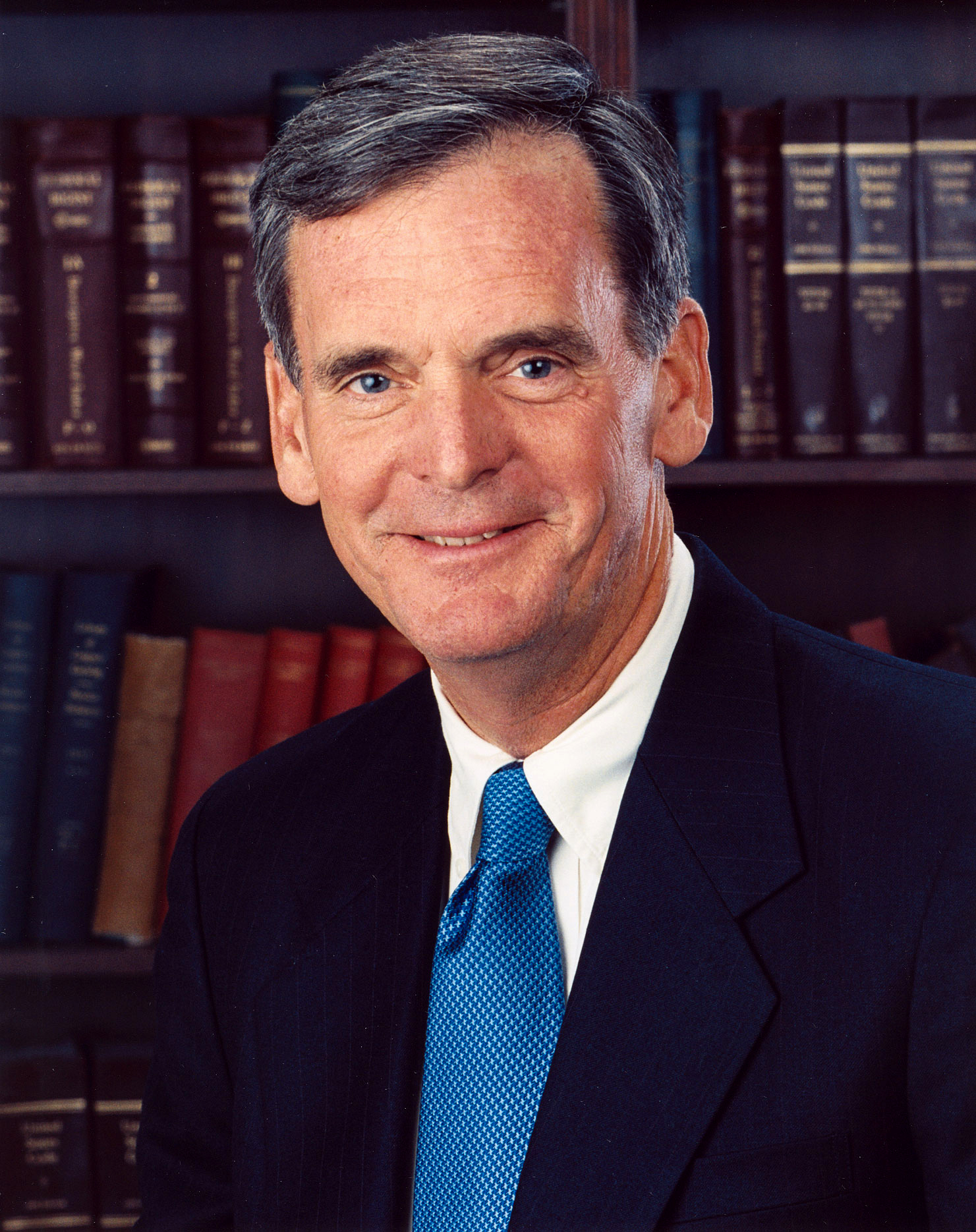
Judd Gregg

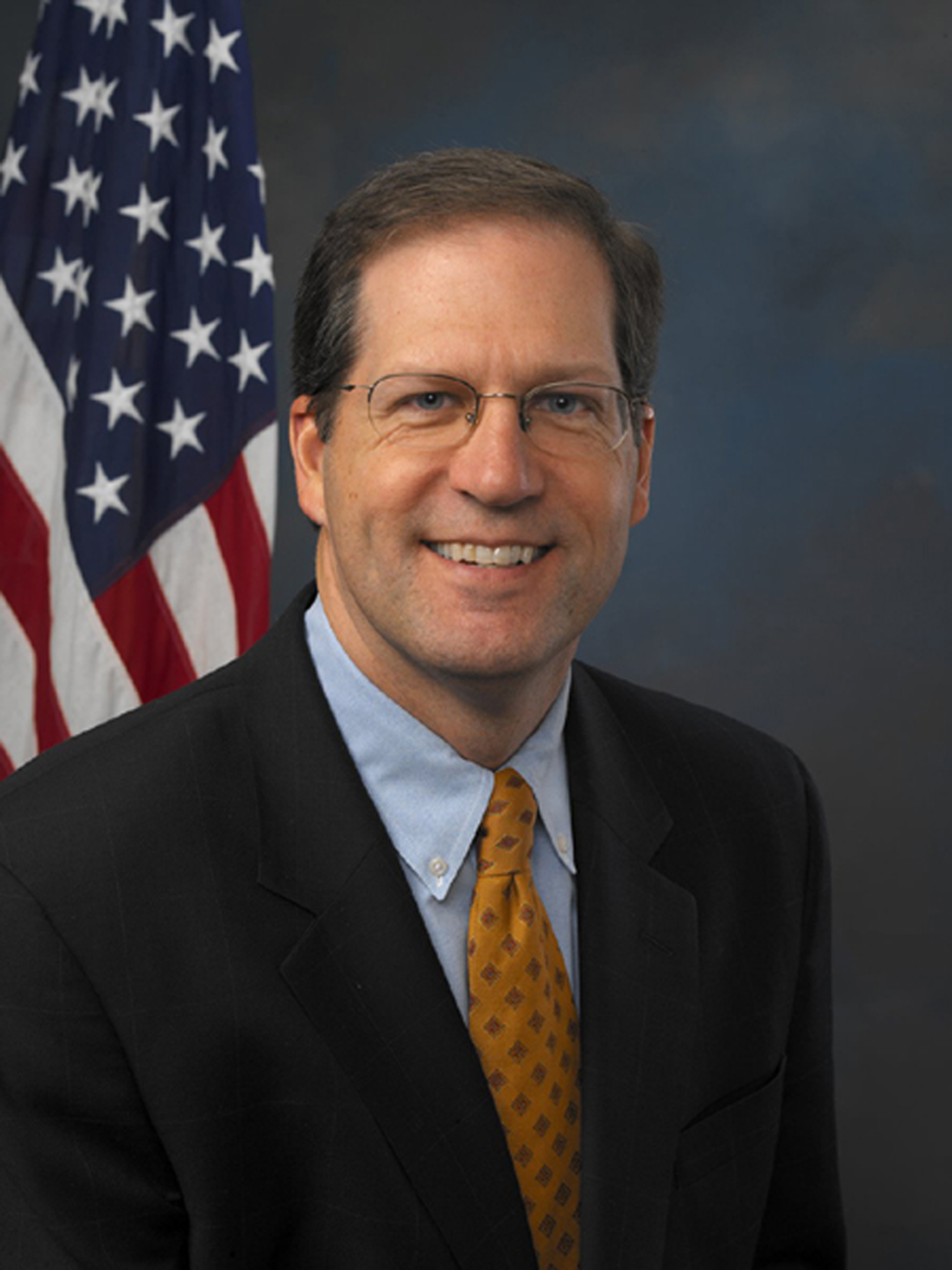
John E. Sununu

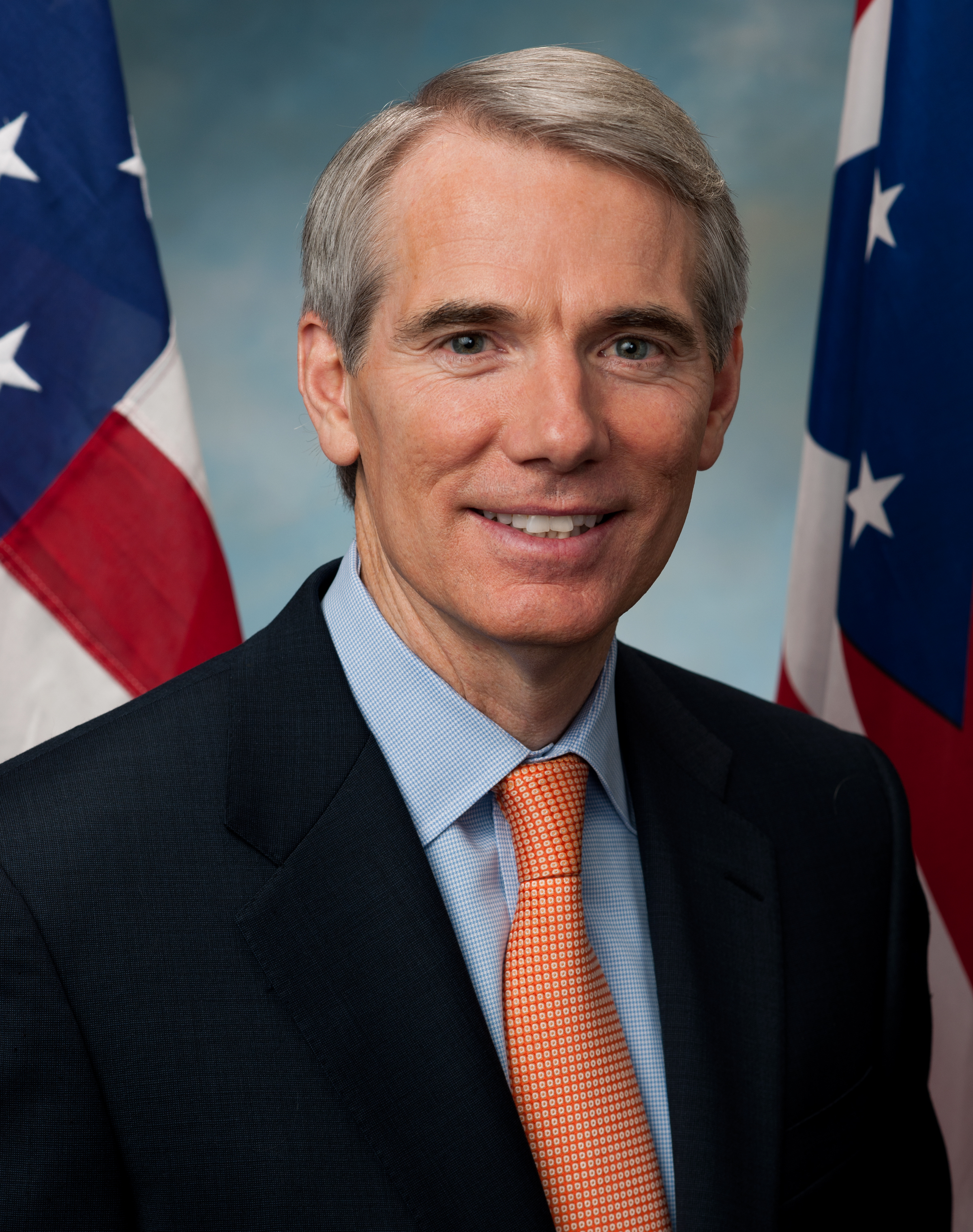
Rob Portman

- Pat Toomey, Pennsylvania (2011–2023)
- Judd Gregg, New Hampshire (1993–2011), Governor of New Hampshire (1989–1993)
- Gordon J. Humphrey, New Hampshire (1979–1990)
- John E. Sununu, New Hampshire (2003–2009)
- Rob Portman, Ohio (2011–2023)

== U.S. representatives ==
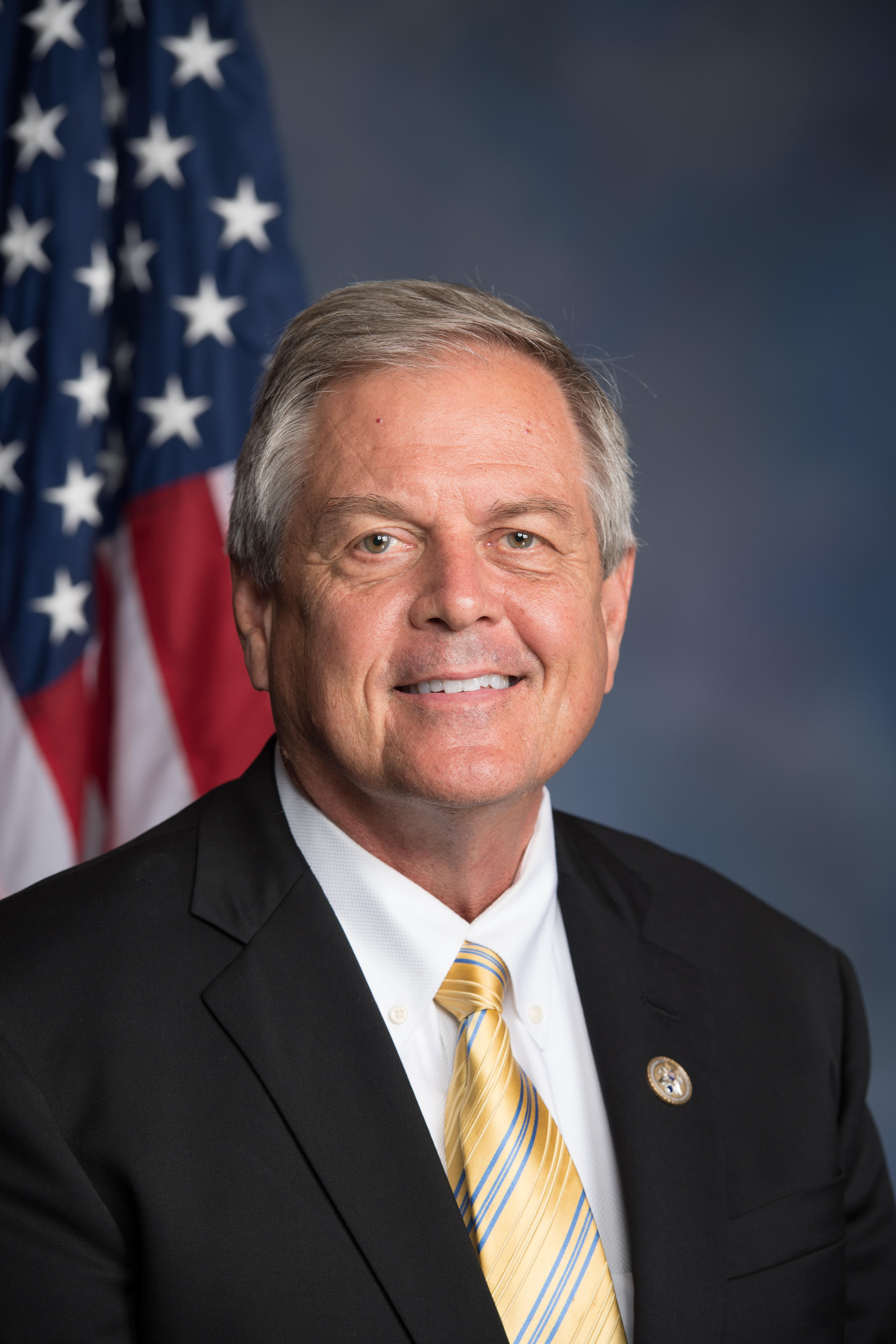
Ralph Norman

=== Current ===
- Ralph Norman, SC-05 (2017–present) (endorsed Trump after Haley withdrew)
- Don Bacon, NE-02 (2017–present) (endorsed Trump after Haley withdrew)

=== Former ===
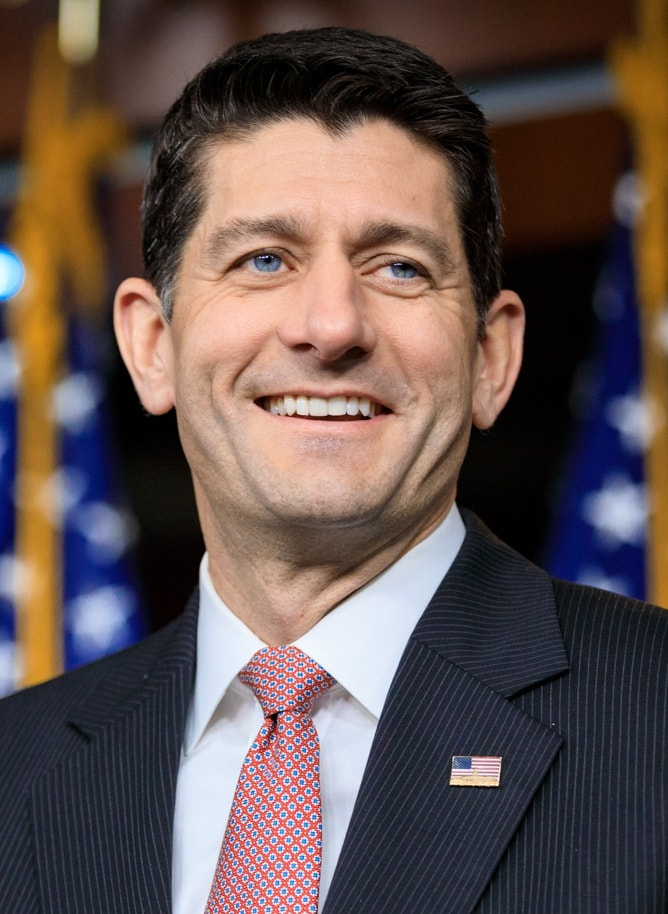
Paul Ryan

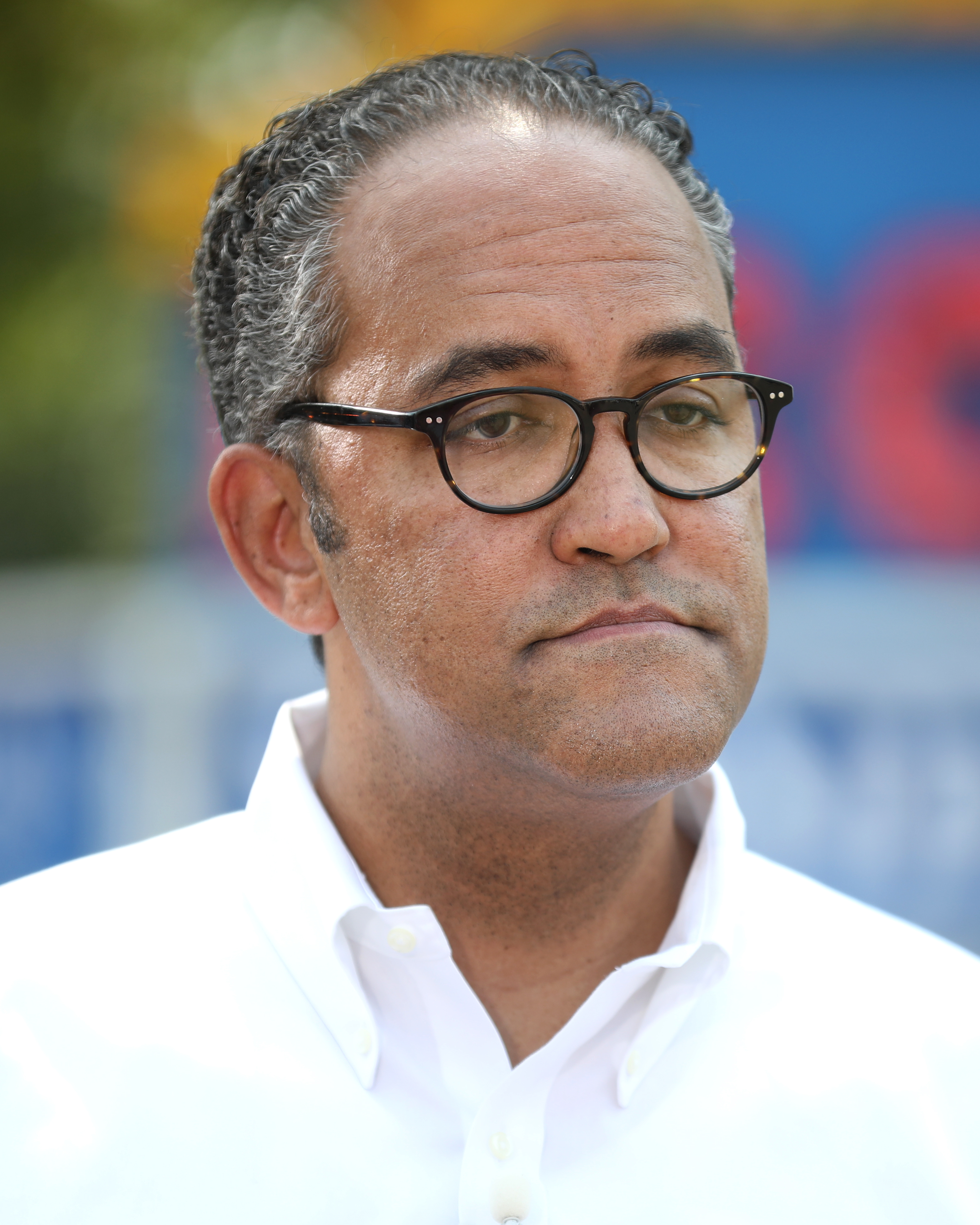
Will Hurd

- Gresham Barrett, SC-03 (2003–2011)
- Charles Bass,NH-02 (1995–2007, 2011–2013)
- Rob Bishop, UT-01 (2003–2021)
- Charles Boustany, LA-03 (2005–2017)
- Joseph Cao, LA-02 (2009–2011)
- Chuck Douglas, NH–02 (1989–1991)
- Gary Franks, CT-05 (1991–1997)
- Will Hurd, TX-23 (2015–2021) and former 2024 Republican presidential candidate
- Enid Greene Mickelsen, UT-02 (1995–1997)
- Paul Ryan, speaker of the House (2015–2019) from WI-01 (1999–2019)
- Lamar Smith, TX-21 (1987–2019) (previously endorsed DeSantis)
- Mac Thornberry, TX-13 (1995–2021)

== Governors ==
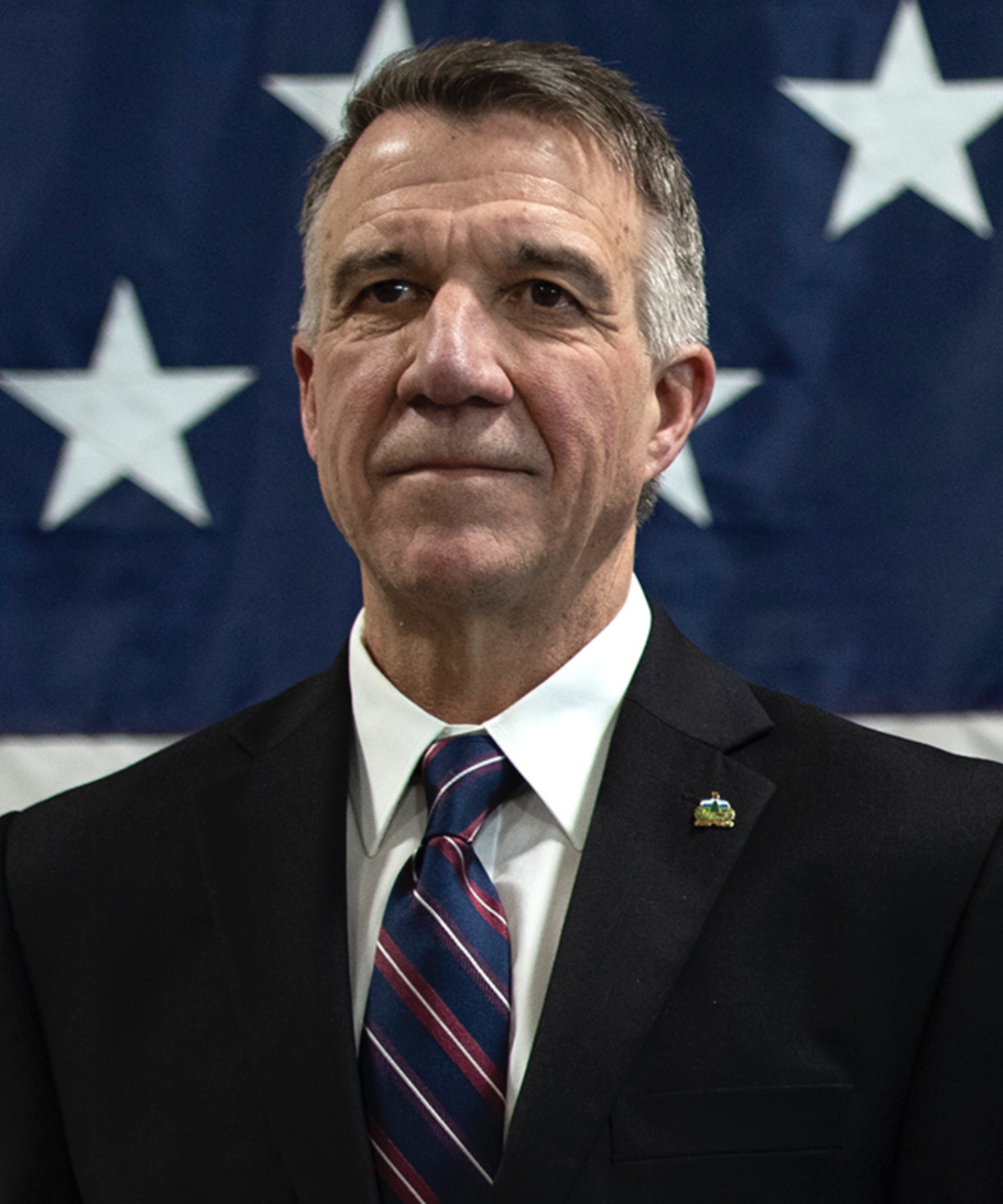
Phil Scott

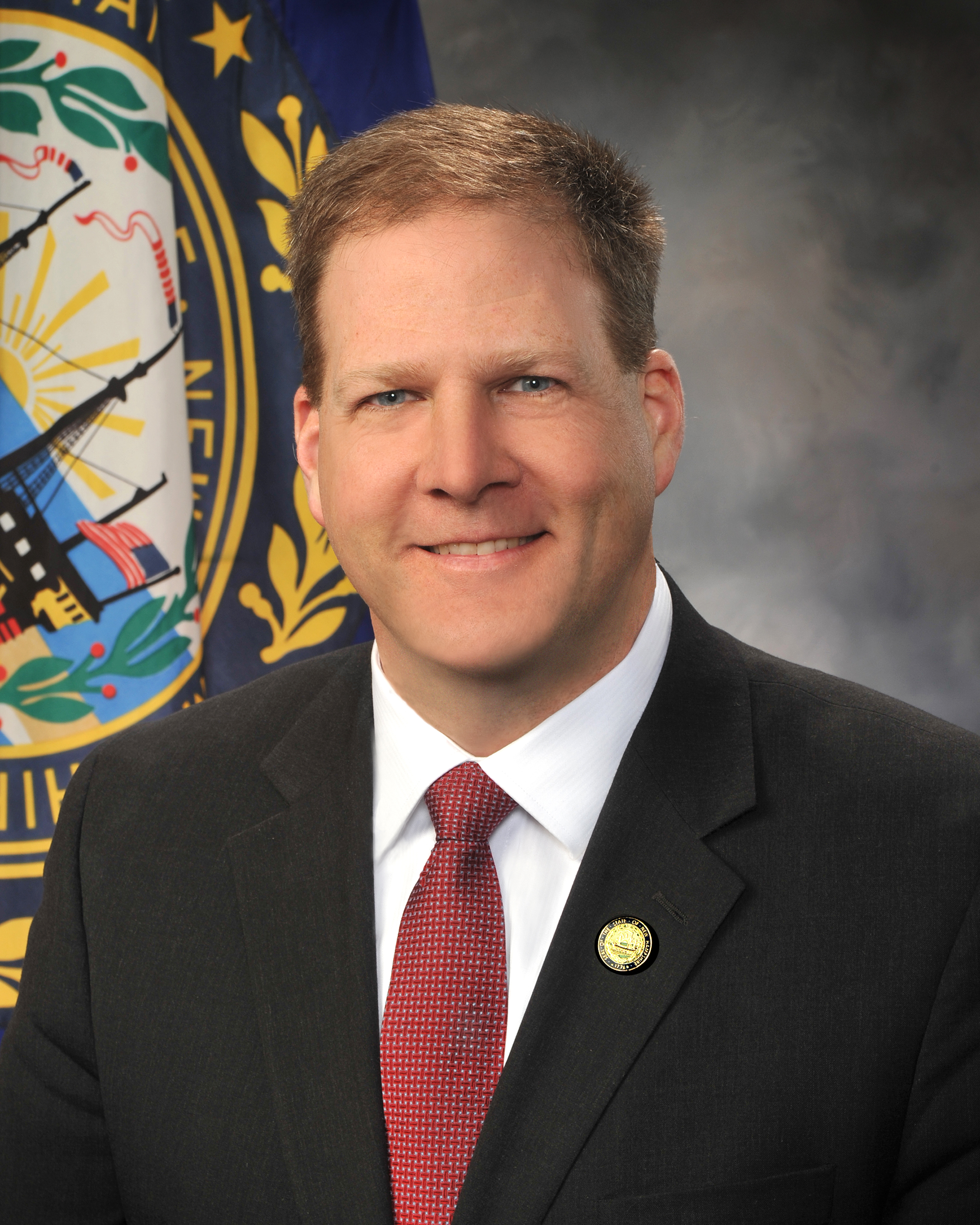
Chris Sununu

=== Current ===
- Phil Scott, governor of Vermont (2017–present)
- Chris Sununu, governor of New Hampshire (2017–2025) (endorsed Trump after Haley withdrew)

=== Former ===
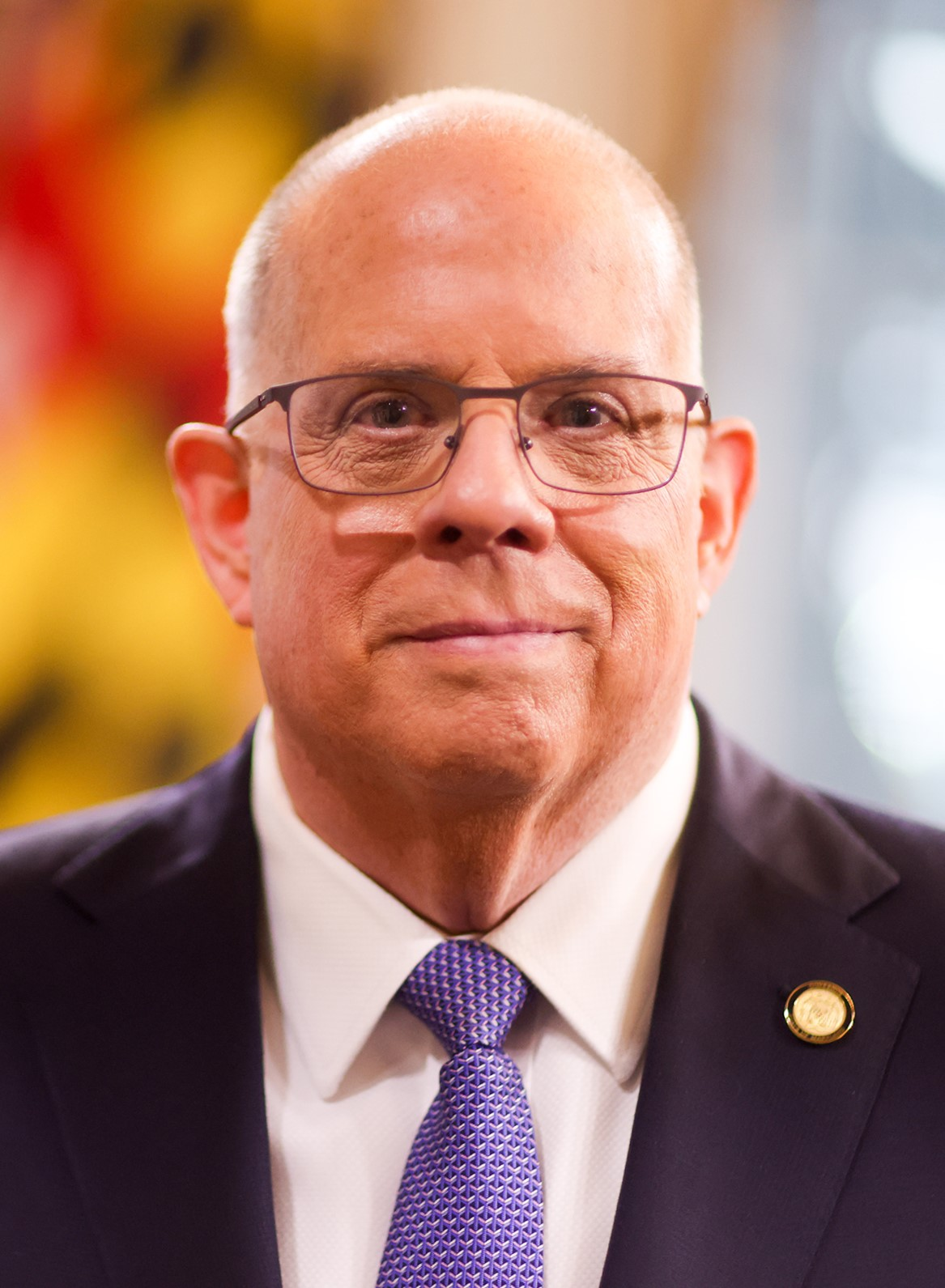
Larry Hogan

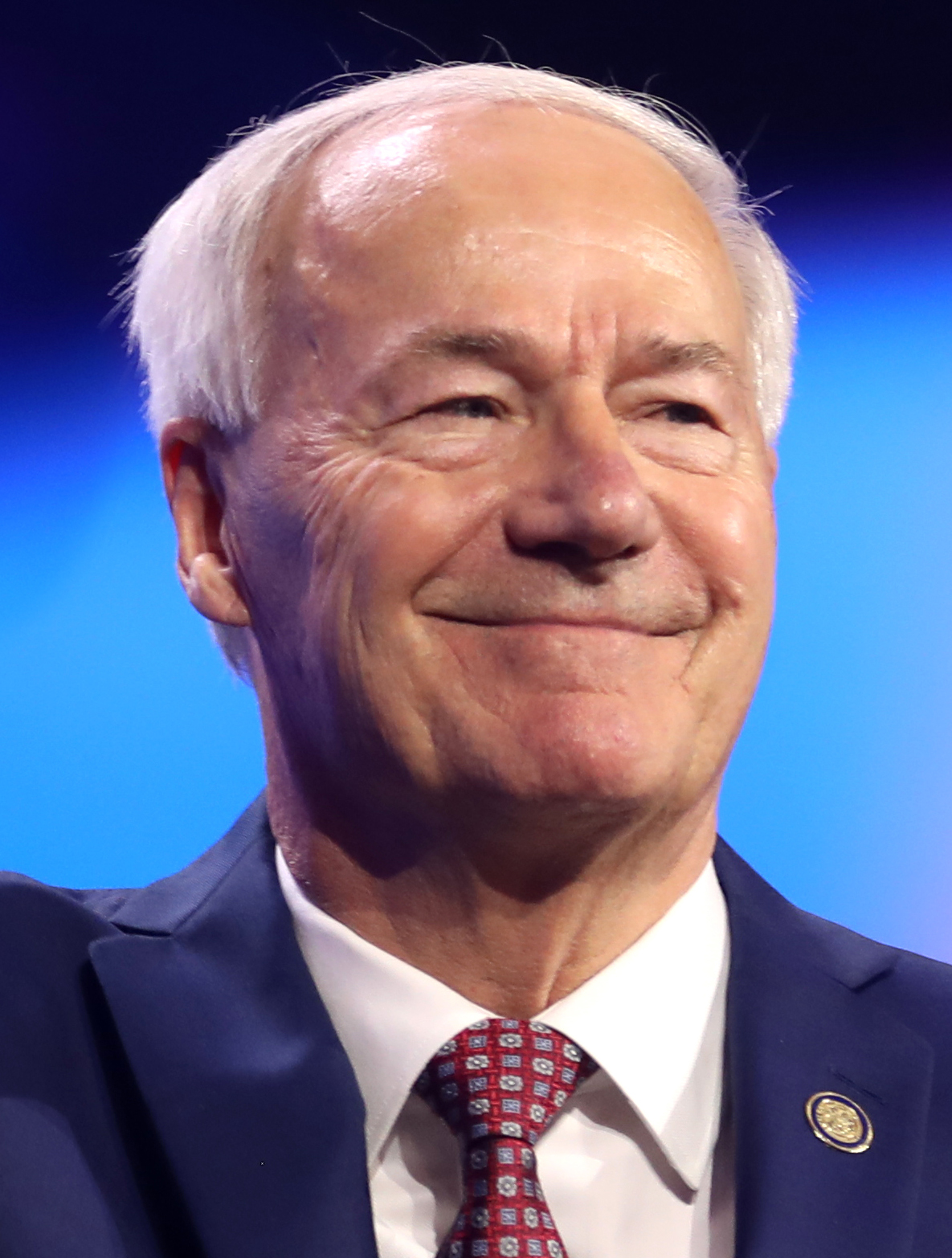
Asa Hutchinson

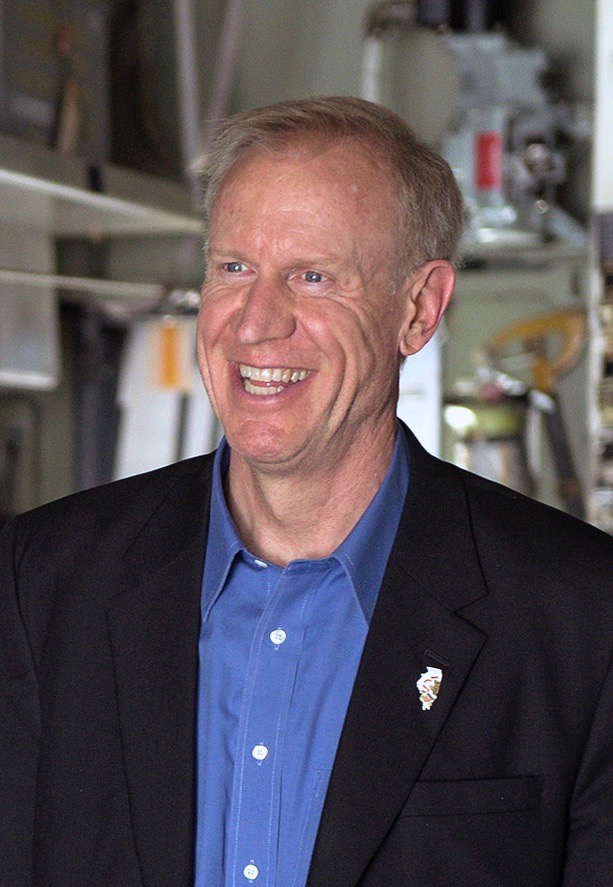
Bruce Rauner

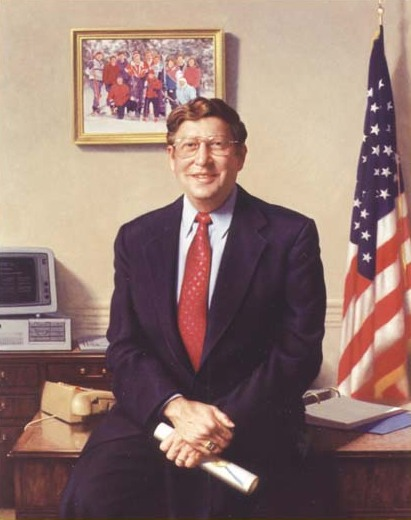
John H. Sununu

- Larry Hogan, governor of Maryland (2015–2023)
- Asa Hutchinson, governor of Arkansas (2015–2023) and former 2024 Republican presidential candidate
- Bruce Rauner, governor of Illinois (2015–2019) (previously endorsed DeSantis)
- John H. Sununu, governor of New Hampshire (1983–1989)

== State executive officials ==
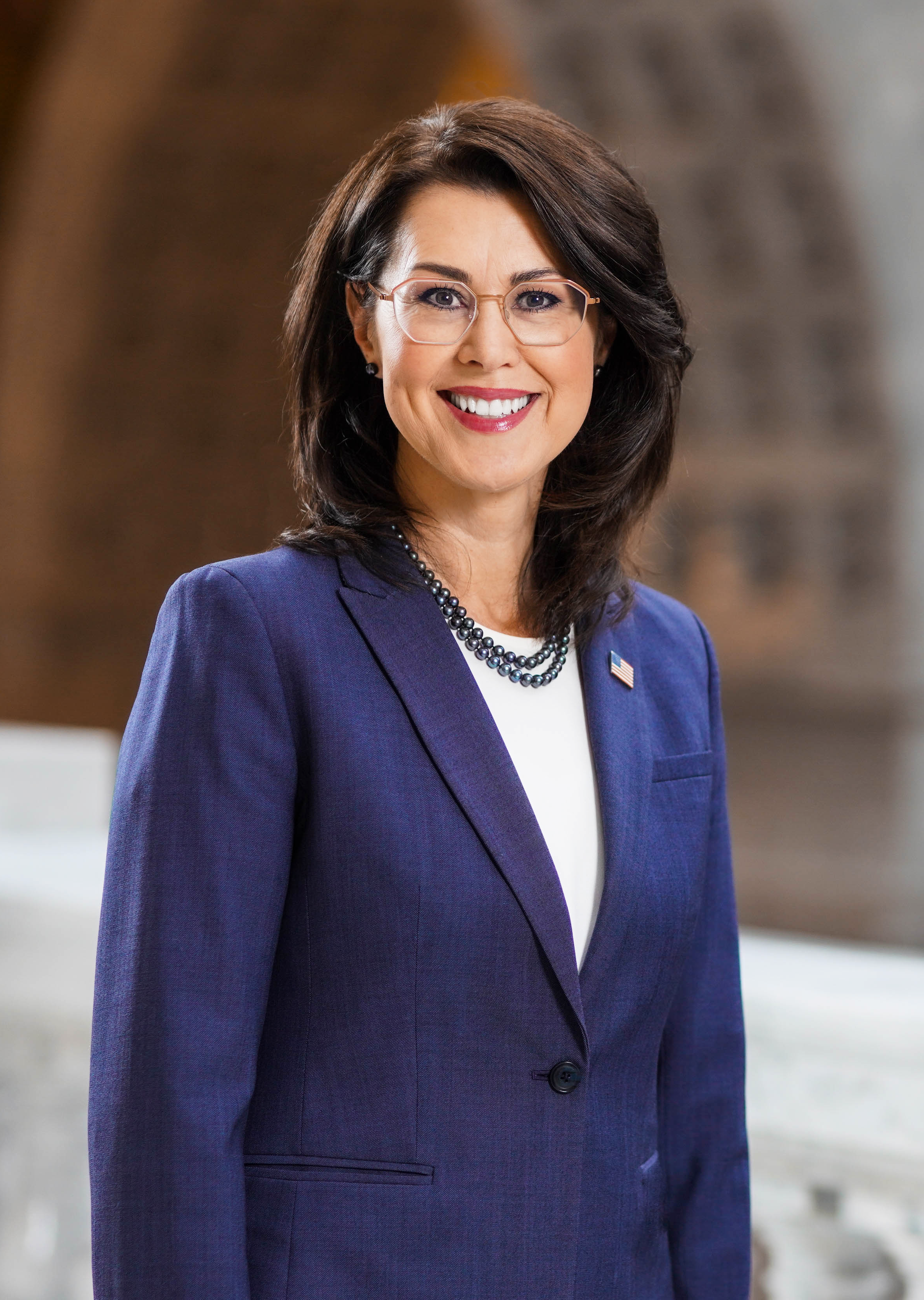
Deidre Henderson

=== Current ===
- Deidre Henderson, lieutenant governor of Utah (2021–present)
- Billy Nungesser, lieutenant governor of Louisiana (2016–present)

=== Former ===
- Jay Dardenne, lieutenant governor of Louisiana (2010–2016)

== State legislators ==
=== Current ===
==== Georgia ====
- Scott Hilton, HD-95 (2023–present)

==== Iowa ====
- Chris Cournoyer, SD-35 (2019–present)
- Jane Bloomingdale, HD-60 (2017–present)
- Jacob Bossman, HD-14 (2018–present)
- Austin Harris, HD-26 (2023–present)
- Chad Ingels, HD-68 (2021–present)
- Megan Jones, HD-06 (2013–present)
- Shannon Latham, HD-55 (2021–present)
- Brian Lohse, HD-45 (2019–present)

==== Louisiana ====
- Barbara Freiberg, HD-70 (2020–present)
- Stephanie Hilferty, HD-94 (2016–present)

==== Massachusetts ====
- Kimberly Ferguson, HD-1st Worcester (2011–present)
- Paul Frost, HD-7th Worcester (1997–present)
- Bradley Jones Jr., House minority leader (2003–present) from HD-20th Middlesex (1994–present)
- Hannah Kane, HD-11th Worcester (2015–present)
- Joseph D. McKenna, HD-18th Worcester (2015–present)
- Matt Muratore, HD-1st Plymouth (2015–2025)
- Michael Soter, HD-8th Worcester (2019–present)
- David Vieira, HD-3rd Barnstable (2011–present)
- Donald Wong, HD-9th Essex (2011–present)

==== New Hampshire ====
- Michael Moffett, HD-Merrimack's 4th (2016–present)
- Bill Gannon, SD-23 (2016–2018, 2020–present)
- Stephen Pearson, HD-Rockingham's 13th (2022–present)
- John Sytek, HD-Rockingham's 8th (2010–present)

==== Pennsylvania ====
- Bryan Cutler, House minority leader (2023–present) from HD-100 (2007–present)

==== South Carolina ====
- Bart Blackwell, HD-81 (2016–2024)
- Mike Neese, HD-44 (2023–present)
- Chris Wooten, HD-69 (2018–present)
- Nathan Ballentine, HD-71 (2005–present)
- Chip Campsen, SD-43 (2004–present) (previously endorsed Tim Scott)
- Tom Davis, SD-46 (2009–present)
- Larry Grooms, SD-37 (1997–present) (previously endorsed Tim Scott)
- Shane Massey, Senate majority leader (2016–present) from SD-25 (2007–present) (previously endorsed Tim Scott)
- Katrina Shealy, South Carolina State Senator from the 23rd district (2013–present) (previously endorsed Tim Scott)

==== Texas ====
- Kyle Kacal, HD-12 (2013–2025)

==== Utah ====
- Evan Vickers, Senate majority leader (2019–present) from SD-28 (2013–present) (previously endorsed DeSantis)
- Curt Bramble, SD-24 (2001–2024)
- Mike McKell, SD-25 (2021–present) (previously endorsed DeSantis)
- Ann Millner, SD-05 (2015–present)
- Karen M. Peterson, HD-13 (2022–present)
- Casey Snider, HD-05 (2019–present)
- Doug Welton, HD-65 (2021–present)

==== Virginia ====
- Carrie Coyner, HD-75 (2020–2026)

==== Washington ====
- Stephanie Barnard, HD-08 (2023–present)
- Keith Goehner, HD-12 (2019–present)
- Paul Harris, HD-17 (2011–present)
- Jacquelin Maycumber, HD-07 (2017–2025)
- J. T. Wilcox, HD-02 (2011–2025)
- Drew Stokesbary, House minority leader from HD-31 (2015–present)
- Mike Steele, HD-12 (2017–present)
- Ann Rivers, SD-18 (2012–present)
- Eric Robertson, HD-31 (1995–1998, 2021–2025)
- Judy Warnick, SD-13 (2015–present)
- Keith Wagoner, SD-39 (2018–present)
- Drew MacEwen, SD-35 (2023–present)
- April Connors, SD-08 (2023–present)

==== Wisconsin ====
- Devin LeMahieu, Senate majority leader (2021–present) from SD-09 (2015–present)

=== Former ===
==== Iowa ====
- Carmine Boal, HD-70 (1999–2009)
- Bob Brunkhorst, SD-09 (2002–2005)
- Dan Clute, HD-59 (2007–2009)
- George Eichhorn, HD-09 (2001–2007)
- Mary Ann Hanusa, HD-16 (2011–2021)
- Libby Jacobs, HD-60 (2003–2009)
- Kevin Koester, HD-70 (2009–2019)
- Linda Miller, HD-94 (2007–2017)
- Scott Raecker, HD-76 (1999–2012)
- Jack Rife, SD-29 (1983–2001)
- Steven Sukup, HD-18 (1995–2003)
- Maggie Tinsman, SD-21 (1989–2007)

==== New Hampshire ====
- Gene G. Chandler, former speaker of the House (2000–2004, 2017–2018) from HD-Carroll's 1st (1982–2018)
- Stephen Duprey, HD-Carroll's 2nd (1972–1976)
- John Gallus, SD-01 (2002–2012)
- Neal Kurk, HD-Hillsborough's 2nd (1986–2018)
- Mariellen MacKay, HD-Hillsborough's 30th (2012–2014)
- Mary Mayville, HD-Hillsborough's 21st (2020–2022)
- John Reagan, SD-17 (2012–2022)
- Kimberly Rice, HD-Hillsborough's 37th (2014–2022)
- Doug Scamman Jr., HD-Rockingham's 13th (2004–2010)
- Stella Scamman, HD-Rockingham's 13th (2002–2010)
- Vicki Schwaegler, HD-Grafton's 3rd (2016–2018)
- Eric Stohl, HD-Coos' 1st (2000–2010)
- Donna Sytek, HD-Rockingham's 26th (1977–2000)

==== Utah ====
- Nolan Karras, former speaker of the House (1989–1990)

==== Massachusetts ====
- Shawn Dooley, HD-9th Norfolk (2014–2022)
- Lenny Mirra, HD-2nd Essex (2013–2023)

==== New York ====
- Andrew Stein, AD-65 (1969–1977) (Democratic; previously endorsed Trump)

==== Washington ====
- Paul Graves, former HD-05 (2017–2019)

==== Texas ====
- Florence Shapiro, SD-08 (1995–2013)
- Joe Straus, speaker of the House (2009–2019)

== Local officials ==
- William S. Cogswell Jr., mayor of Charleston, South Carolina (2024–present)
- George Hansel, mayor of Keene, New Hampshire (2020–2024)
- Aimee Winder Newton, Salt Lake City councilmember from the 3rd district (2014–present)
- Dee Margo, mayor of El Paso, Texas (2017–2021)
- Betsy Price, mayor of Fort Worth, Texas (2011–2021)

== Party officials ==
- Bill Binnie, former New Hampshire Republican State Committee finance committee chair
- Katon Dawson, South Carolina Republican Party chair (2002–2009)
- Jennifer Nassour, Massachusetts Republican Party chair (2009–2011) (Haley's campaign surrogate)
- Amy Tarkanian, Nevada Republican Party chair (2011–2012) (previously endorsed DeSantis)
- Diane Tebelius, Washington Republican Party chair (2006–2007)

== Notable individuals ==
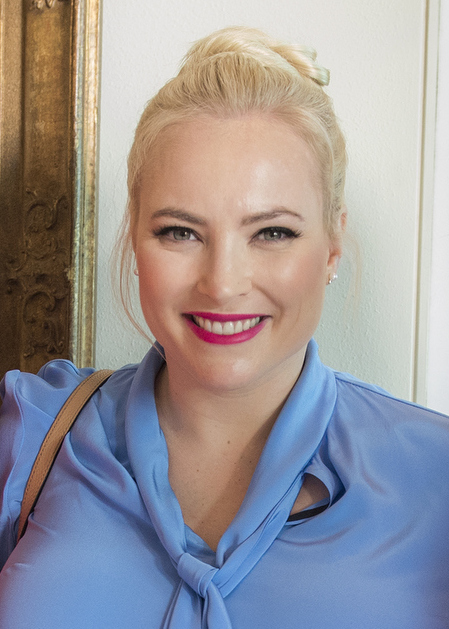
Meghan McCain

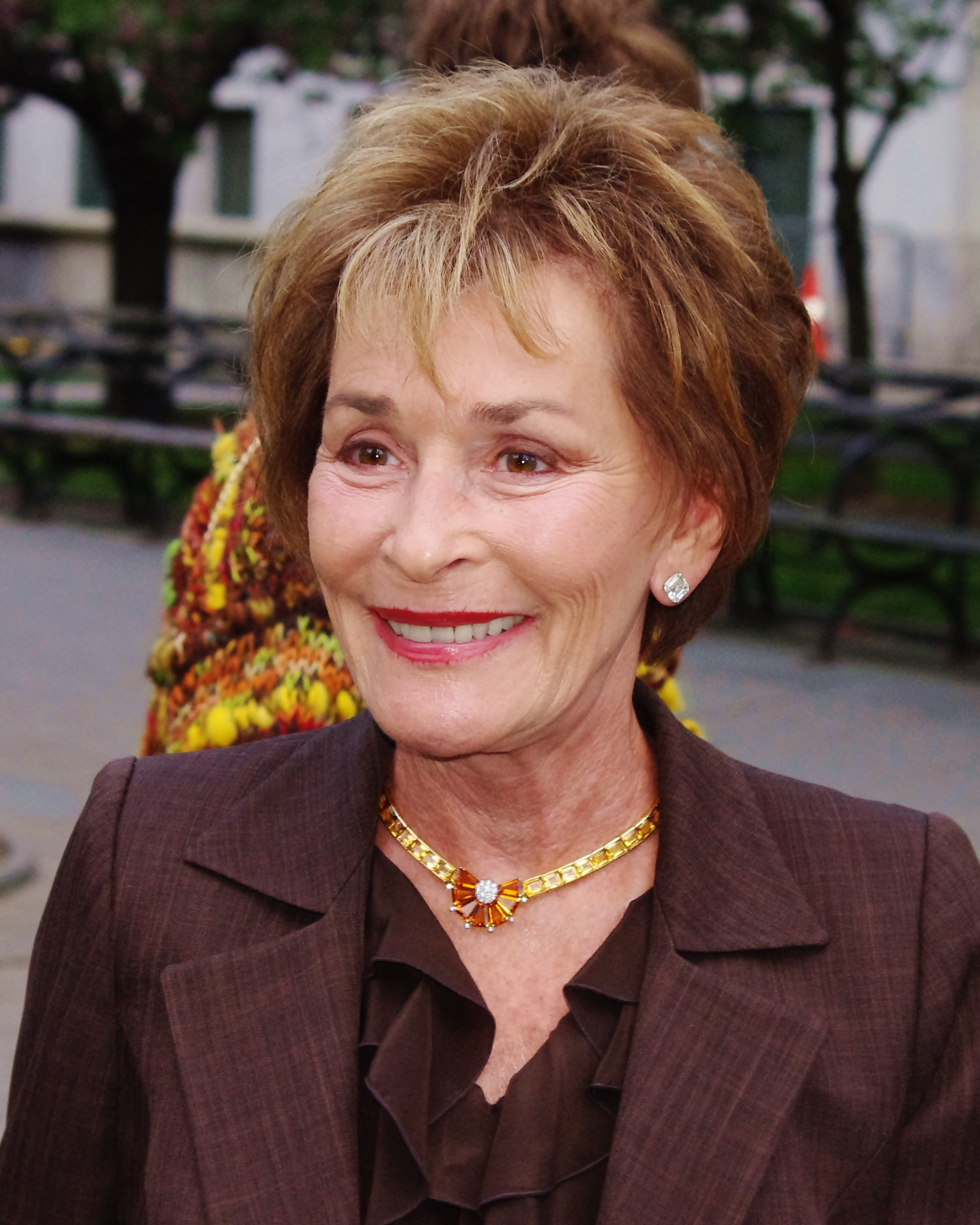
Judy Sheindlin

- Cliff Asness, co-founder of AQR Capital Management
- Abby Cox, first lady of Utah (2021–present)
- Don Bolduc, retired U.S. Army brigadier general and 2022 Republican U.S. Senate nominee in New Hampshire
- Ron Cameron, owner and chairman of Mountaire Farms (previously endorsed Mike Pence)
- Charlamagne tha God, radio and television personality (later endorsed Harris)
- Jason Church, attorney
- Mark Cuban, businessman and investor (endorsed Harris after Haley and Biden withdrew)
- Jim Davis, owner and chairman of New Balance and co-founder of Major League Lacrosse
- Tim Draper, founder of Draper Fisher Jurvetson and Draper University
- Stanley Druckenmiller, former lead portfolio manager for Quantum Fund
- John Hagee, televangelist and founder and chairman of Christians United for Israel
- Sharlene Wells Hawkes, reporter, businesswoman, and Miss America 1985
- Henry Kravis, co-founder of KKR & Co.
- Jan Koum, co-founder of WhatsApp
- Fiona Givens, author
- Kenneth C. Griffin, founder of Citadel LLC
- Ken Langone, co-founder of The Home Depot
- Frank Laukien, president and CEO of Bruker
- Meghan McCain, TV personality, author, and daughter of John McCain
- Star Parker, TV host and syndicated columnist
- Ross Perot Jr., co-owner of the Texas Super Kings and former owner of the Dallas Mavericks
- Judy Sheindlin, host of Judge Judy and Judy Justice
- Randy Shumway, founder and CEO of Cicero Group
- Barry Sternlicht, co-founder, chairman, and CEO of Starwood Capital Group
- Michael Strain, economist
- Cindy Warmbier, mother of Otto Warmbier
- George Will, journalist
- Anita Zucker, chair and CEO of the InterTech Group

== Newspapers ==
- New Hampshire Union Leader
- The Boston Globe
- The Detroit News (Republican primary only)
- The Post and Courier
- The Seattle Times
- Houston Chronicle (Republican primary only)

== Organizations ==
- Americans for Prosperity

== Maps ==
Endorsements by incumbent Republicans in the House of Representatives
Endorsed Donald Trump (162)
Endorsed Ron DeSantis (2) (withdrawn)
Endorsed Mike Pence (2) (withdrawn)
Endorsed Nikki Haley (1)
Endorsed Mike Pompeo (1) (declined to run)
No endorsement (44)
Declined to endorse a candidate (7)

Endorsements by incumbent Republicans in the U.S. Senate
Endorsed Donald Trump (33)
Endorsed Nikki Haley (2)
Endorsed Tim Scott (1) (withdrawn)
No endorsement (6)
Declined to endorse a candidate (7)

Endorsements by incumbent Republican governors
Endorsed Donald Trump (16)
Endorsed Nikki Haley (2)
Endorsed Ron DeSantis (1) (withdrawn)
Endorsed Mike Pence (1) (withdrawn)
No endorsement (5)
Declined to endorse a candidate (2)
Endorsements by incumbent Republicans in the Iowa Senate
Endorsed Ron DeSantis (13)
Endorsed Donald Trump (8)
Endorsed Nikki Haley (1)
Endorsed Vivek Ramaswamy (1)
No endorsement (11)
Non-Republicans (16)

Endorsements by incumbent Republicans in the Iowa House of Representatives
Endorsed Ron DeSantis (27)
Endorsed Donald Trump (15)
Endorsed Nikki Haley (7)
Endorsed Vivek Ramaswamy (1)
No endorsement (14)
Non-Republicans (36)

Endorsements by incumbent Republicans in the New Hampshire Senate Endorsed Ron DeSantis (1) (withdrawn) Endorsed Nikki Haley (1) Endorsed Donald Trump (1) No endorsement (11)

Endorsements by incumbent Republicans in the New Hampshire House of Representatives Endorsed Donald Trump (51) Endorsed Ron DeSantis (26) (withdrawn) Endorsed Vivek Ramaswamy (7) (withdrawn) Endorsed Nikki Haley (3) Endorsed Larry Elder (1) (withdrawn) No endorsement (110) Non-Republicans (202)

Endorsements by incumbent Republicans in the South Carolina House of Representatives Endorsed Donald Trump (61) Endorsed Ron DeSantis (4) (withdrawn) Endorsed Nikki Haley (4) Endorsed Tim Scott (2) (withdrawn) No endorsement (17) Non-Republicans (36)

Endorsements by incumbent Republicans in the South Carolina Senate Endorsed Donald Trump (7) Endorsed Nikki Haley (5) Endorsed Tim Scott (4) (withdrawn) Endorsed Ron DeSantis (1) (withdrawn) No endorsement (13) Non-Republicans (16)

== See also ==
- Endorsements in the 2024 Republican Party presidential primaries
- List of Donald Trump 2024 presidential campaign primary endorsements
- List of Ron DeSantis 2024 presidential campaign primary endorsements
