= Iowa's 55th House of Representatives district =

American legislative district

House District 55
- Type: District of the Lower house
- Location: Iowa
- Representative: Shannon Latham
- Parent organization: Iowa General Assembly

The 55th District of the Iowa House of Representatives in the state of Iowa. It is currently composed of Franklin and Hamilton Counties, as well as part of Wright and Story Counties.

== Current elected officials ==
Shannon Latham is the representative currently representing the district.

== Past representatives ==
The district has previously been represented by:

- John N. Nystrom, 1971–1973
- William R. Ferguson, 1973–1975
- Carroll Perkins, 1975–1981
- Karen Mann, 1981–1983
- Virgil E. Corey, 1983–1989
- Mark S. Shearer, 1989–1993
- Chuck Larson, 1993–2003
- Clarence Hoffman, 2003–2009
- Jason Schultz, 2008–2013
- Roger Thomas, 2013–2015
- Darrel Branhagen, 2015–2017
- Michael Bergan, 2017–2023
- Shannon Latham, 2023–2027
- Beau Klaver, 2027–Present
