= Harold McCormick =

Harold McCormick may refer to:

- Harold Fowler McCormick (1872–1941), American businessman and tennis player
- Harold C. McCormick (1910–2000), American politician from Iowa
