= Frank Pedrick =

American politician (1896–1981)

Frank Pedrick (April 15, 1896 – May 8, 1981) was an American politician.

Frank Pedrick was born in Wapello County, Iowa to parents Samuel Manro and Emma Peck Pedrick on April 15, 1896. He served in World War I, with the United States Navy. Pedrick married Isal F. Judd in 1930. Pedrick operated the Pedrick and Thorne Hardware store in Ottumwa from 1935 to 1961. He was a Freemason and member of the Kiwanis. From 1951 to 1955, Pedrick was a Republican member of the Iowa House of Representatives from District 18. He died on May 8, 1981, in Ottumwa.
