= Tom Shipley =

Tom Shipley may refer to:

- Tom Shipley (singer-songwriter) (1941–2025), of American folk rock duo Brewer & Shipley
- Tom Shipley (politician) (born 1953), Iowa state senator
