= Beau Klaver =

American politician

Member of the Iowa House of Representatives from the 55th district
- Member-elect
- Assumed office January 1, 2027
- Preceded by: Shannon Latham

Personal details
- Party: Republican
- Education: Iowa State University
- Website: www.klaverforiowa.com

Beau Klaver is an American politician. A member of the Republican Party, he was elected to the Iowa House of Representatives in 2026, representing the 55th district. He succeeded fellow Republican Shannon Latham in the 2026 election. The district contains all of Franklin and Hamilton Counties, southeastern Wright County and the northwest part of Story County. Klaver is a farmer from Hamilton County, Iowa.
