= Steve Baier =

American politician

Member-elect of the Iowa Senate from the 9th district
- Assuming office January 1, 2027
- Succeeding: Tom Shipley

Personal details
- Party: Republican

Steve Baier is an American politician. A member of the Republican Party, he is the member-elect of the Iowa State Senate for the 9th district, having won election in 2026. He was elected in the 2026 election to succeed retiring Republican Tom Shipley. He is an educator, farmer, and Cass County Supervisor. He is a former wrestling coach.
