= Iowa's 18th House of Representatives district =

American legislative district

House District 18
- Type: District of the Lower house
- Location: Iowa
- Representative: Tom Moore
- Parent organization: Iowa General Assembly

The 18th District of the Iowa House of Representatives in the state of Iowa is composed of Cass and Montgomery Counties, and part of Page County.

== Current elected officials ==
Tom Moore is the representative currently representing the district.

== Past representatives ==
The district has previously been represented by:

- Otto Armstrong, 1953–1955
- Kenneth D. Scott, 1971–1973
- Harold C. McCormick, 1973–1975
- Terry Dyrland, 1975–1979
- Darrell R. Hanson, 1979–1983
- Richard W. Welden, 1983–1987
- Robert D. Fuller, 1987–1991
- Clark E. McNeal, 1991–1995
- Steven Sukup, 1995–2003
- David Lalk, 2003–2007
- Andrew Wenthe, 2007–2013
- Jason Schultz, 2013–2015
- Steven Holt, 2015–2023
