= Kenneth D. Scott =

American politician (1930–2023)

Kenneth Scott

Member of the Iowa Senate from the 15th district
- In office January 12, 1987 – January 13, 1991
- Preceded by: Arthur Gratias
- Succeeded by: Allen Borlaug

Member of the Iowa Senate from the 6th district
- In office January 8, 1973 – January 9, 1977
- Preceded by: George L. Shawver
- Succeeded by: Alvin V. Miller

Member of the Iowa House of Representatives from the 18th district
- In office January 11, 1971 – January 7, 1973
- Preceded by: Charles Poncy
- Succeeded by: Harold C. McCormick

Personal details
- Born: Kenneth Daniel Scott; May 11, 1930 Mason City, Iowa, U.S.
- Died: February 2, 2023 (aged 92) Mason City, Iowa, U.S.
- Party: Democratic
- Occupation: farmer, auctioneer

Kenneth Daniel Scott (May 11, 1930 – February 2, 2023) was an American politician.

== Biography ==
Kenneth Daniel Scott was born in Mason City, Iowa, on May 11, 1930, to parents Walter and Hattie Scott. He graduated from Rockwell High School in 1948, which later merged into the Rockwell–Swaledale Community School District. Scott later served as president of the school board for the neighboring Meservey–Thornton Community School District, as well as on several agricultural organizations. Outside of politics, Scott was a farmer and auctioneer.

A Democrat, Scott was elected to the Iowa House of Representatives in 1970 for District 18, which then included his home county. He won election to the Iowa Senate in 1972, representing District 6 and again in 1986, this time for District 15.

Scott, a resident of Clear Lake, died at the MercyOne Hospice Inpatient Unit in Mason City on February 2, 2023, at the age of 92.
