= Jason Schultz =

American politician (born 1972)

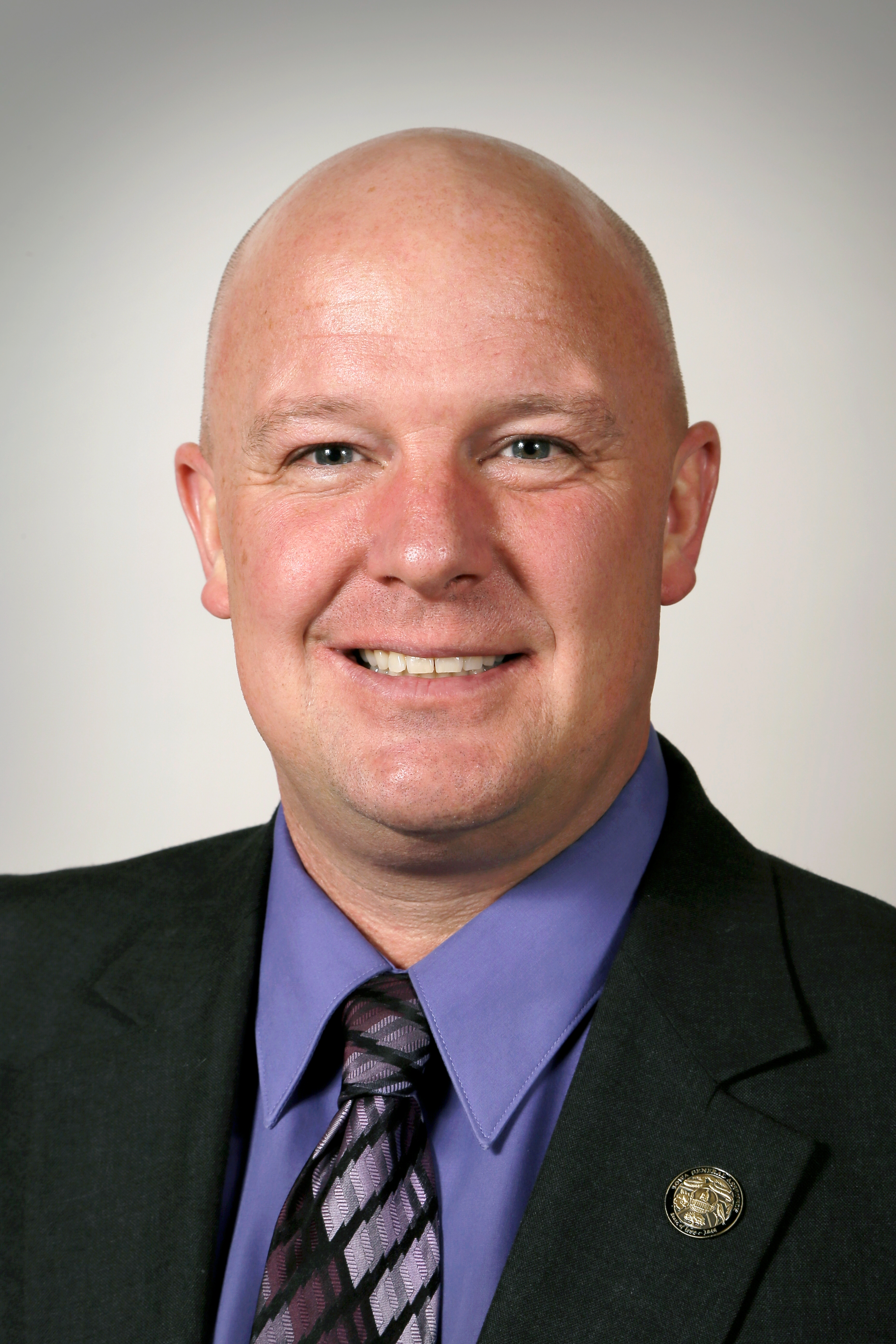

Member of the Iowa Senate
- Incumbent
- Assumed office January 2015
- Preceded by: Nancy Boettger
- Constituency: District 9 - (2015-2023); District 6 - (2023-Present)

Member of the Iowa House of Representatives
- In office January 12, 2009 – January 11, 2015
- Preceded by: Clarence Hoffman
- Succeeded by: Steven Holt
- Constituency: 55th district - (2009-2013); 18th district - (2013-2015)

Personal details
- Born: November 27, 1972 (age 53)
- Party: Republican
- Spouse: Amy
- Children: 2
- Profession: Farmer, insurance adjuster
- Website: Schultz' Website

Jason M. Schultz (born November 27, 1972) is the Iowa State Senator from the 6th District - previously Iowa's 9th District (2015-2023). A Republican, he served in the Iowa House of Representatives from 2009 to 2015 and is an advocate for the loosening of child labor laws. He lives in Schleswig, Crawford County.

Schultz worked as an insurance adjuster at Farmers Mutual Insurance Association in Schleswig and has farmed near Schleswig with his father DeWayne Schultz. For 13 years Schultz served as a volunteer firefighter, and served seven years in the Iowa National Guard. He is a retiring member of the Horn Memorial Hospital Foundation in the fall of 2007. In 2011 he endorsed Republican presidential candidate Ron Paul. In 2015 he endorsed Presidential Candidate Ted Cruz.

As of January 2013, Schultz serves on several committees in the Iowa House – the Economic Growth, Environmental Protection, and Labor committees. He also serves as the chair of the Local Government committee and as a member of the Administration and Regulation Appropriations Subcommittee.

As of January 2017, Schultz serves as the chair of the Labor and Business Relations committee, and a member of the Judiciary, State Government, and Ways and Means committees.

== Electoral history ==
*incumbent

Election	Political result	Candidate	Party	Votes	%
Iowa House of Representatives primary elections, 2008; District 55; Turnout: 2,087		Jason Schultz		1,207	57.83%
Iowa House of Representatives primary elections, 2008; District 55; Turnout: 2,087		Don C. Freidrichsen	Republican	844	40.44%
Iowa House of Representatives general elections, 2008; District 55	Republican hold	Jason Schultz	Republican	unopposed	
Iowa House of Representatives primary elections, 2010; District 55	Republican	Jason Schultz*	Republican	unopposed	
Iowa House of Representatives general elections, 2010; District 55	Republican hold	Jason Schultz*	Republican	unopposed	
Iowa House of Representatives primary elections, 2012; District 18	Republican	Jason Schultz*	Republican	unopposed	
Iowa House of Representatives general elections, 2012; District 18; Turnout: 14,196	Republican (newly redistricted)	Jason Schultz*	Republican	8,351	58.83%
Iowa House of Representatives general elections, 2012; District 18; Turnout: 14,196	Republican (newly redistricted)	Kasey Friedrichsen	Democratic	4,406	31.04%
Iowa Senate general elections, 2014; District 9	Republican hold	Jason Schultz	Republican	unopposed	

Iowa Senate
Preceded by Craig Williams	6th District; 2023 -	Succeeded by Incumbent
Preceded by Nancy Boettger	9th District; 2015 - 2023	Succeeded by Tom Shipley
Iowa House of Representatives
Preceded by Andrew Wenthe	18th District; 2013 – 2015	Succeeded by Steven Holt
Preceded by Clarence Hoffman	55th District; 2009 – 2013	Succeeded by Roger Thomas
