= List of Donald Trump 2024 presidential campaign endorsements =

A range of notable individuals, groups, and organizations endorsed Donald Trump for the 2024 United States presidential election.

== See also ==
- List of former first Trump administration officials who endorsed Kamala Harris
- List of Republicans who opposed the Donald Trump 2024 presidential campaign
- List of Joe Biden 2024 presidential campaign endorsements
- List of Kamala Harris 2024 presidential campaign endorsements
- Endorsements in the 2024 Republican Party presidential primaries
- List of Ron DeSantis 2024 presidential campaign endorsements
- List of Nikki Haley 2024 presidential campaign endorsements
