= 2014 Iowa Senate election =

Iowa State Senate elections, 2014
- November 4, 2014

25 out of 50 seats in the Iowa State Senate 26 seats needed for a majority
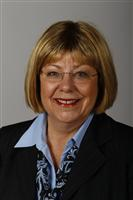

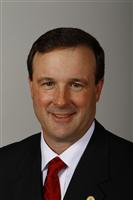
	Majority party	Minority party
Leader	Pam Jochum	Bill Dix
Party	Democratic	Republican
Leader's seat	50th district	25th district
Last election	26	24
Seats before	26	24
Seats after	26	24
Seat change	Steady	Steady
- Results of the elections: Democratic gain Republican gain Democratic hold Republican hold No election
President of the Senate before election
Pam Jochum
Democratic
Elected President of the Senate
Pam Jochum
Democratic

The 2014 Iowa Senate election was held on November 4, 2014. The Senate seats for the twenty-five odd-numbered districts were up for election. Senate terms are staggered such that half the membership is elected every two years, with each senator serving a four-year term. Prior to the election, the Democrats were in the majority. They kept this majority after the election. As of 2025, this is the last time the Democrats won a majority in the Iowa Senate.

== Senate composition ==
Iowa Senate: pre-election	Seats
Democratic-held	26
Republican-held	24
Total	50

2014 Elections
Democratic held and uncontested	18
Contested	14
Republican held and uncontested	18
Total	50

Iowa Senate: post-election	Seats
Democratic-held	26
Republican-held	24
Total	50

== Predictions ==
Source	Ranking	As of
Governing	Tossup	October 20, 2014

== Results ==
Final results from the Iowa Secretary of State

* indicates incumbent

=== District 1 ===
2014 State Senate District 1 election
Party	Candidate	Votes	%	±%
Republican	David Johnson*	18,774	78.6%	
Total votes		23,877	100.0%	

=== District 3 ===
2014 State Senate District 3 election
Party	Candidate	Votes	%	±%
Republican	Bill Anderson*	17,176	77.2%	
Total votes		22,262	100.0%	

=== District 5 ===
2014 State Senate District 5 election
Party	Candidate	Votes	%	±%
Republican	Tim Kraayenbrink	12,383	55.8%	
Democratic	Daryl Beall*	9,801	44.2%	
Total votes		22,184	100.0%	

=== District 7 ===
2014 State Senate District 7 election
Party	Candidate	Votes	%	±%
Republican	Rick Bertrand*	8,766	57.2%	
Democratic	Jim France	5,738	37.4%	
Independent	Maria Rundquist	832	5.4%	
Total votes		15,336	100.0%	

=== District 9 ===
2014 State Senate District 9 election
Party	Candidate	Votes	%	±%
Republican	Jason Schultz	16,293	76.5%	
Total votes		21,306	100.0%	

=== District 11 ===
2014 State Senate District 11 election
Party	Candidate	Votes	%	±%
Republican	Tom Shipley	17,681	78.5%	
Total votes		22,516	100.0%	

=== District 13 ===
2014 State Senate District 13 election
Party	Candidate	Votes	%	±%
Republican	Julian Garrett*	15,326	61.0%	
Democratic	Pam Deichmann	8,900	35.4%	
Libertarian	Clair Tom Thompson	893	3.6%	
Total votes		25,119	100.0%	

=== District 15 ===
2014 State Senate District 15 election
Party	Candidate	Votes	%	±%
Democratic	Chaz Allen	13,307	52.6%	
Republican	Crystal Bruntz	12,008	47.4%	
Total votes		25,315	100.0%	

=== District 17 ===
2014 State Senate District 17 election
Party	Candidate	Votes	%	±%
Democratic	Tony Bisignano	10,548	62.4%	
Republican	Jonathan Lochman	5,374	31.8%	
Independent	Jim Bollard	978	5.8%	
Total votes		16,900	100.0%	

=== District 19 ===
2006 State Senate District 19 election
Party	Candidate	Votes	%	±%
Republican	Jack Whitver*	16,742	81.5%	
Independent	Brett Nelson	3,802	18.5%	
Total votes		20,544	100.0%	

=== District 21 ===
2014 State Senate District 21 election
Party	Candidate	Votes	%	±%
Democratic	Matt McCoy*	17,851	67.0%	
Total votes		26,635	100.0%	

=== District 23 ===
2014 State Senate District 23 election
Party	Candidate	Votes	%	±%
Democratic	Herman C. Quirmbach*	11,713	59.1%	
Republican	Jeremy Davis	8,094	40.9%	
Total votes		19,807	100.0%	

=== District 25 ===
2014 State Senate District 25 election
Party	Candidate	Votes	%	±%
Republican	Bill Dix*	18,267	73.0%	
Total votes		25,038	100.0%	

=== District 27 ===
2006 State Senate District 27 election
Party	Candidate	Votes	%	±%
Democratic	Amanda Ragan*	12,898	56.3%	
Republican	Shawn Dietz	10,012	43.7%	
Total votes		22,910	100.0%	

=== District 29 ===
2014 State Senate District 29 election
Party	Candidate	Votes	%	±%
Democratic	Tod Bowman*	13,245	54.6%	
Republican	James Budde	11,002	45.4%	
Total votes		24,247	100.0%	

=== District 31 ===
2014 State Senate District 31 election
Party	Candidate	Votes	%	±%
Democratic	Bill Dotzler*	13,387	73.5%	
Total votes		18,221	100.0%	

=== District 33 ===
2014 State Senate District 33 election
Party	Candidate	Votes	%	±%
Democratic	Rob Hogg*	14,430	61.8%	
Republican	Harry Foster	8,932	38.2%	
Total votes		23,362	100.0%	

=== District 35 ===
2014 State Senate District 35 election
Party	Candidate	Votes	%	±%
Democratic	Wally Horn*	15,671	69.3%	
Total votes		22,612	100.0%	

=== District 37 ===
2014 State Senate District 37 election
Party	Candidate	Votes	%	±%
Democratic	Robert Dvorsky*	16,613	66.6%	
Total votes		24,934	100.0%	

=== District 39 ===
2014 State Senate District 39 election
Party	Candidate	Votes	%	±%
Democratic	Kevin Kinney*	12,371	52.3%	
Republican	Michael Moore	11,306	47.7%	
Total votes		23,677	100.0%	

=== District 41 ===
2014 State Senate District 41 election
Party	Candidate	Votes	%	±%
Republican	Mark Chelgren*	10,356	50.9%	
Democratic	Steve Siegel	9,982	49.1%	
Total votes		20,338	100.0%	

=== District 43 ===
2014 State Senate District 43 election
Party	Candidate	Votes	%	±%
Democratic	Joe Bolkcom*	18,000	77.8%	
Total votes		23,142	100.0%	

=== District 45 ===
2014 State Senate District 45 election
Party	Candidate	Votes	%	±%
Democratic	Joe Seng*	13,013	73.5%	
Total votes		17,702	100.0%	

=== District 47 ===
2014 State Senate District 47 election
Party	Candidate	Votes	%	±%
Republican	Roby Smith*	14,988	56.4%	
Democratic	Maria Bribriesco	11,580	43.6%	
Total votes		26,568	100.0%	

=== District 49 ===
2014 State Senate District 49 election
Party	Candidate	Votes	%	±%
Democratic	Rita Hart*	11,690	52.0%	
Republican	Brian Schmidt	10,808	48.0%	
Total votes		22,498	100.0%	

== See also ==
- 2014 United States House of Representatives elections in Iowa
- Iowa Senate
- Iowa House of Representatives
- Iowa General Assembly
- Political party strength in U.S. states
