= Susan M. Ford =

American politician

Susan Ford
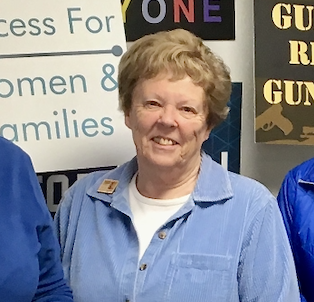

Member of the New Hampshire House of Representatives from Grafton's 3rd district
- In office December 5, 2012 – December 2, 2020
- Preceded by: Vicki Schwaegler
- Succeeded by: Denny Ruprecht

Personal details
- Born: September 20, 1943 (age 83) Guilford, Connecticut
- Party: Democratic
- Education: Hiram College (B.A.); Northern Illinois University (M.S.)
- Profession: Educator

Susan M. Ford (born September 20, 1943) is a Democratic former member of the New Hampshire House of Representatives for Grafton County's 3rd district. The 3rd district includes the towns of Bath, Benton, Easton, Landaff, Orford, Piermont and Warren. She has represented Grafton's 3rd district from 2008 to 2010 and from 2012 to 2020.
