= Otto Armstrong =

American politician (1880–1960)

Member of the Iowa House of Representatives from the 18th district
- In office January 12, 1953 – January 9, 1955
- Preceded by: Dean Aubrey

Personal details
- Born: January 4, 1880 Macon County, Missouri, U.S.
- Died: June 23, 1960 (aged 80) Fort Lauderdale, Florida, U.S.
- Party: Republican
- Spouse(s): Katherine Casada (m. 1903; died 1941) Clare Hale (m. 1942)
- Children: 3
- Education: Ottumwa Commercial College
- Profession: Politician, farmer

Military service
- Allegiance: United States
- Battles/wars: Spanish–American War

Otto Armstrong (January 4, 1880 – June 23, 1960) was an American politician and farmer from Wapello County, Iowa who served in the Iowa House of Representatives from 1953 to 1955, representing the 18th legislative district of Iowa as a Republican in the 55th Iowa General Assembly.

== Early life and education ==
Armstrong was born in Macon County, Missouri on January 4, 1880, near the town of Atlanta, Missouri. He attended local schools and graduated from Ottumwa Commercial College. He served in the Spanish–American War.

== Career ==
In 1950, Armstrong ran for election to the Iowa House of Representatives, though was defeated by Democrat Dean Aubrey in the general election.

Armstrong was subsequently elected to a single term in the Iowa House of Representatives. He served from 1953 to 1955, representing the 18th legislative district of Iowa as a Republican in the 55th Iowa General Assembly.

In 1953, Armstrong was serving on the following standing committees:

- Agriculture 2
- Compensation of Public Officers
- Conservation, Drainage and Flood Control
- Judiciary 2
- Military Affairs
- Public Utilities

Armstrong was a chairman of the Wapello County Ration Board. He was also a chairman of the Wapello County Soldiers Relief Commission for 20 years.

== Personal life and death ==
Armstrong married Fairfield, Iowa native Katherine Casada in 1903, with whom he raised three children. Casada died in 1941; Armstrong married Clare Hale the following year. They farmed together near Ottumwa, Iowa.

Armstrong died at the age of 80 in Fort Lauderdale, Florida on June 23, 1960.

== Electoral history ==
1950 Iowa House of Representatives District 18 general election
| Party | Candidate | Votes | % |
|---|---|---|---|
| Democratic | Dean Aubrey | 7,197 | 50.15 |
| Republican | Otto Armstrong | 7,155 | 49.85 |
| Total votes | | 14,352 | 100.0 |
| Democratic hold | | | |

Iowa House of Representatives
| Preceded by — | Member of the Iowa House of Representatives from the 18th district 1953–1955 | Succeeded by — |
