= Iowa's 63rd House of Representatives district =

American legislative district

House District 63
- Type: District of the Lower house
- Location: Iowa
- Representative: Michael Bergan
- Parent organization: Iowa General Assembly

The 63rd District of the Iowa House of Representatives in the state of Iowa. It is currently composed of Howard and Winneshiek Counties, as well as part of Fayette County.

== Current elected officials ==
Michael Bergan is the representative currently representing the district.

== Past representatives ==
The district has previously been represented by:

- Robert Kreamer, 1971–1973
- Carl V. Nielsen, 1973–1979
- Richard Sherzan, 1979–1981
- Dennis Renaud, 1981–1983
- George R. Swearingen, 1983–1989
- Robert L. Kistler, 1989–1993
- Teresa Garman, 1993–2003
- Scott Raecker, 2003–2013
- Sandy Salmon, 2013–2023
- Michael Bergan, 2023–Present
