= Teresa Garman =

American politician (born 1937)

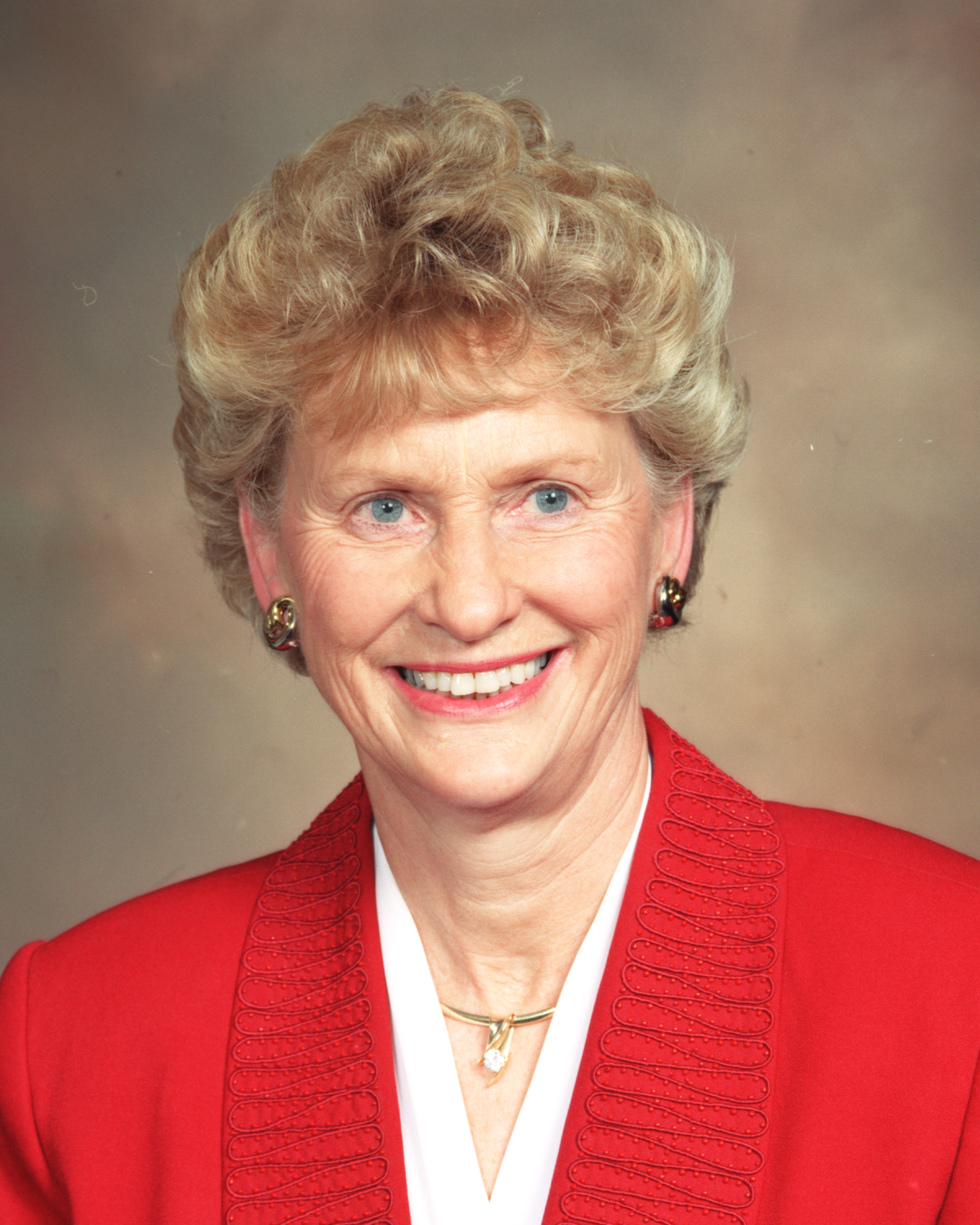

Member of the Iowa House of Representatives
- In office January 12, 1987 – January 12, 2003

Personal details
- Born: August 29, 1937 (age 88) Webster County, Iowa, United States
- Party: Republican
- Spouse: Merle Garman
- Children: four
- Occupation: farmer, realtor, landlord

Teresa A. Garman (née Lennon; born August 29, 1937) is an American politician in the state of Iowa.

Garman was born in Webster County, Iowa. A Republican, she served in the Iowa House of Representatives from 1987 to 2003 (87th district from 1987 to 1993 and 63rd district from 1993 to 2003). She supported Ron DeSantis in the 2024 Iowa Republican presidential caucuses.
