= Tom Shipley (politician) =

American politician

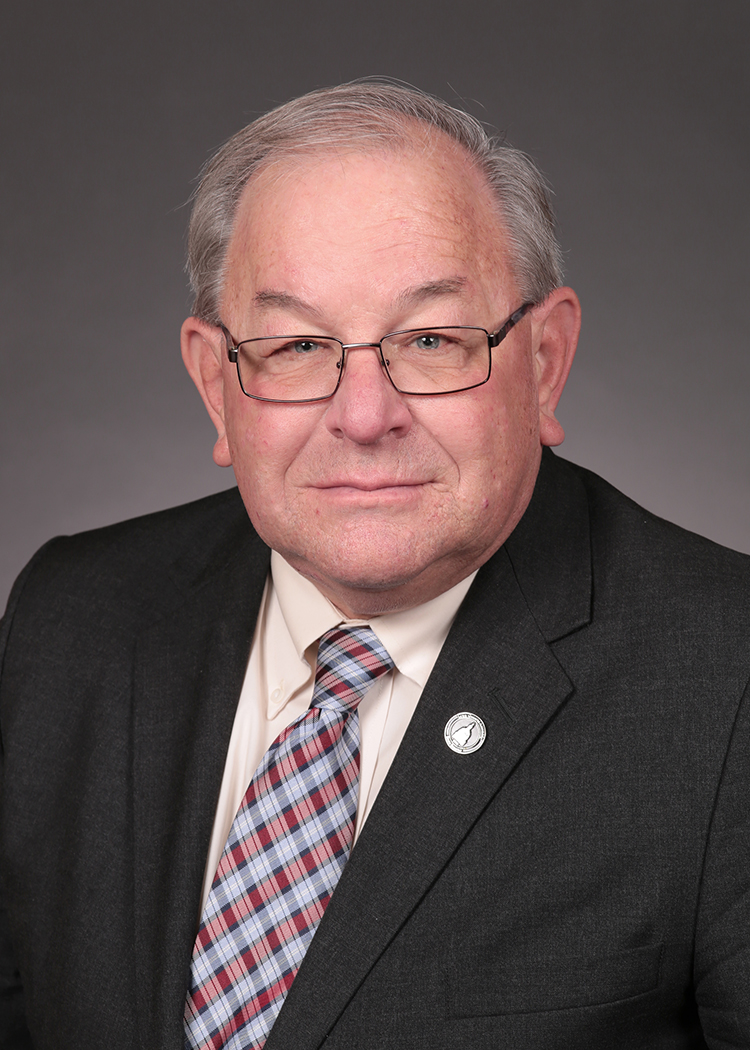

Member of the Iowa Senate from the 9th district
- Incumbent
- Assumed office January 12, 2015
- Preceded by: Hubert Houser
- Succeeded by: Steve Baier (elect)
- Constituency: 9th District (2023-2027); 11th District (2015-2023)

Personal details
- Born: 1953 (age 72–73) Corning, Iowa, U.S.
- Party: Republican
- Education: Iowa Western Community College; Iowa State University (B.A.)
- Website: Shipley's website

Tom Shipley (born 1953) is the Iowa State Senator from the 9th District. A Republican, he has served in the Iowa Senate since 2015. He currently resides in Corning, Iowa.

As of February 2020, Shipley serves on the following committees: Natural Resources and Environment (Vice Chair)), Agriculture, Appropriations, Judiciary, and Transportation. He also serves on the Agriculture and Natural Resources Appropriations Subcommittee (Chair), as well as the Iowa Commission on Interstate Cooperation.

Shipley was elected in 2014 with 17,681 votes, running unopposed. He retired at the 2026 election.

Iowa Senate
Preceded by Jason Schultz	9th District; 2023 -	Succeeded by Incumbent
Preceded by Hubert Houser	11th District; 2015 – 2023	Succeeded by Julian Garrett
