= Michael Bergan =

American politician

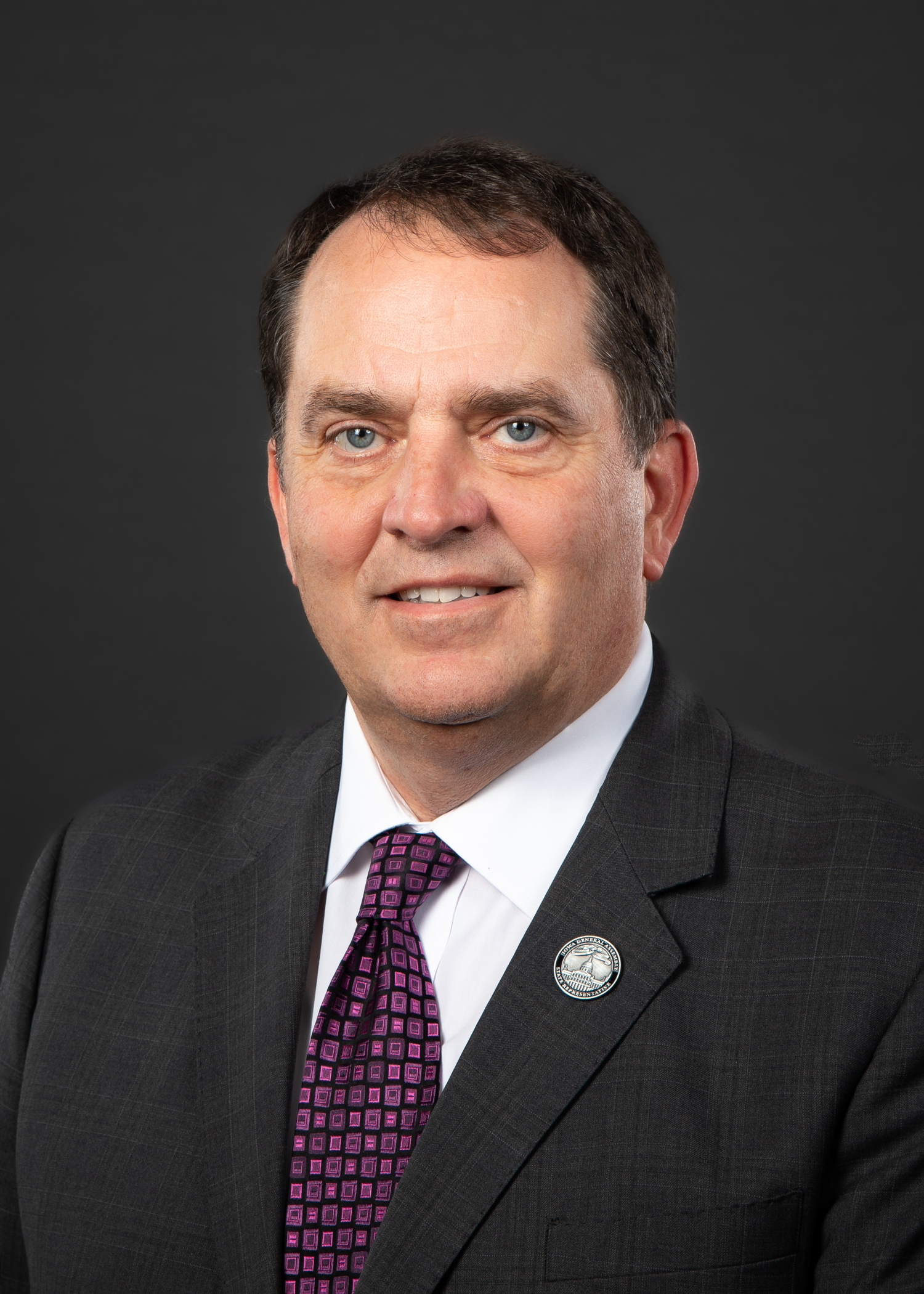

Member of the Iowa House of Representatives from the 63rd district
- Incumbent
- Assumed office January 9, 2017
- Preceded by: Darrel Branhagen

Personal details
- Born: August 16, 1962 (age 64) Winneshiek County, Iowa, U.S.
- Party: Republican
- Spouse: Carol
- Children: 2
- Education: Luther College
- Website: Legislative website

Michael Bergan is a member of the Iowa House of Representatives from House District 63. He has served as a Republican in the Iowa House of Representatives since January 2017. Bergan is a resident of Winneshiek County, Iowa.

During the 2017 legislative session, Bergan served on the following committees in the Iowa House of Representatives: Human Resources (Vice Chair), State Government, and Ways and Means.

Iowa House of Representatives
Preceded by Sandy Salmon	63rd District; 2023 – present	Succeeded by Incumbent
Preceded by Darrel Branhagen	55th District; 2017 – 2023	Succeeded by Shannon Latham
