= Shannon Latham =

American politician

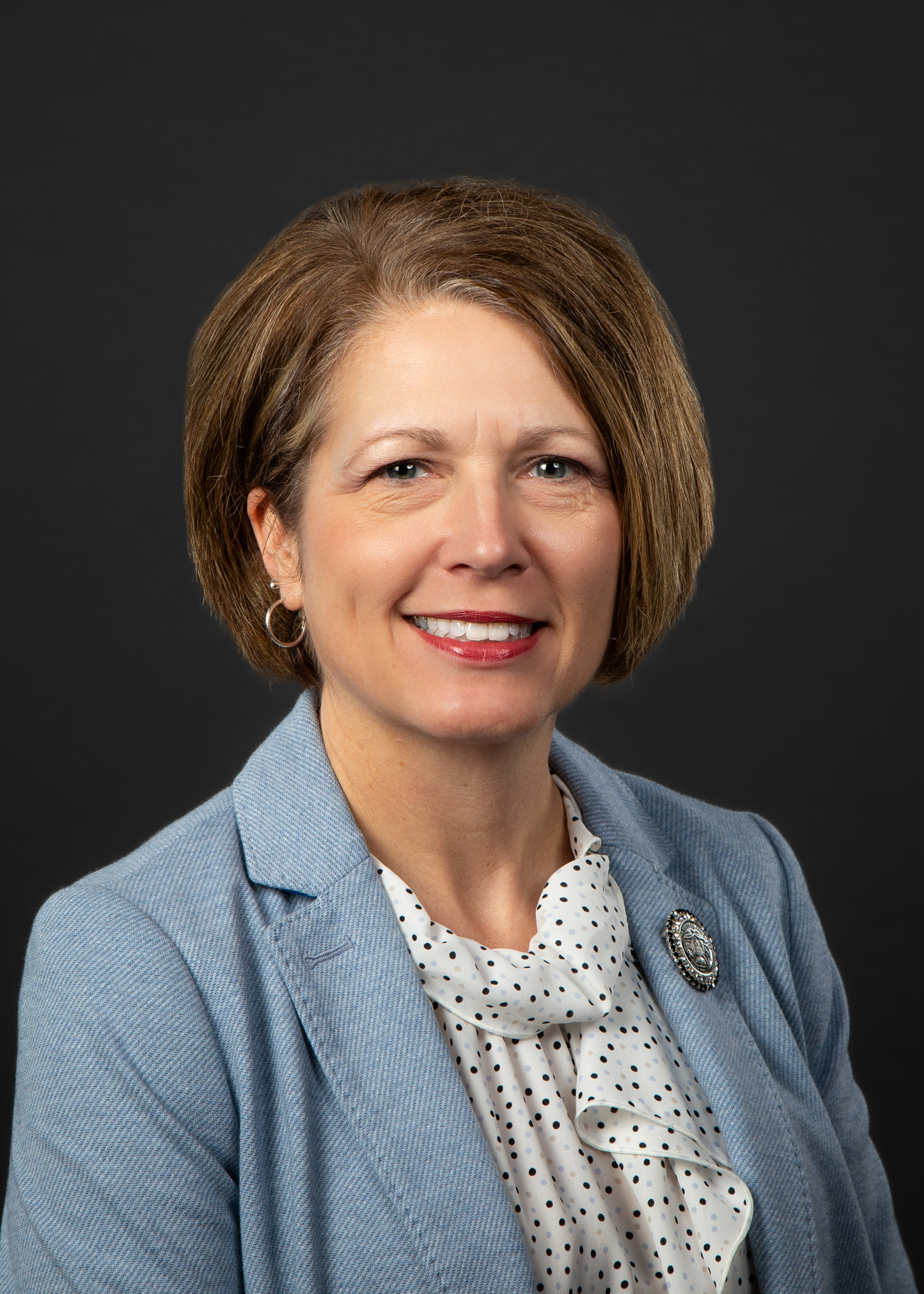

Member of the Iowa House of Representatives from the 55th district
- Incumbent
- Assumed office January 11, 2021
- Preceded by: Linda Upmeyer
- Succeeded by: Beau Klaver (elect)

Personal details
- Party: Republican
- Spouse: John Latham
- Relations: Tom Latham
- Education: Iowa State University (BS); University of Iowa (MBA)

Shannon Latham is an American politician serving as a member of the Iowa House of Representatives from the 55th district. Elected in November 2020, she assumed office on January 11, 2021.

== Education ==
Latham earned a Bachelor of Science degree in agricultural journalism, public service, and administration in agriculture from Iowa State University and a Master of Business Administration from the University of Iowa.

== Career ==
Latham began her career as a lobbyist, eventually working as director of legislative affairs for the Agribusiness Association of Iowa. She later served as the agriculture program coordinator for the Iowa Department of Agriculture and Land Stewardship. Latham has also worked as a public relations specialist for Meyocks & Priebe Advertising. In 2018, Latham ran for 27th district in the Iowa Senate, losing narrowly to Amanda Ragan. Latham was elected to the Iowa House of Representatives in November 2020 and assumed office in January 2021. She is vice chair of the House Appropriations Committee.

== Personal life ==
Latham is married to John Latham, the nephew of former Congressman Tom Latham.

Iowa House of Representatives
Preceded by Michael Bergan	55th District; 2023 – present	Succeeded by Incumbent
Preceded by Linda Upmeyer	54th District; 2021 – 2023	Succeeded by Joshua Meggers
