= Clarence Hoffman =

American politician (1933–2025)

Charence C. Hoffman
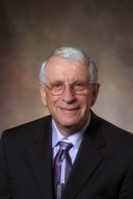

Member of the Iowa House of Representatives from the 55th district
- In office January 1999 – January 2009
- Preceded by: Chuck Larson
- Succeeded by: Jason Schultz

Personal details
- Born: August 7, 1933 Leola, South Dakota, U.S.
- Died: February 28, 2025 (aged 91) Denison, Iowa, U.S.
- Party: Republican
- Spouse: Lynn Beaudean (m. 1968)
- Children: 2
- Parents: John Hoffman (father); Christina Rath (mother)
- Education: South Dakota State University
- Website: Hoffman's website

Clarence Clifford Hoffman (August 7, 1933 – February 28, 2025) was an American politician who served as a Republican member of the Iowa House of Representatives from 1999 to 2009.

In his final Iowa House term, Mr. Hoffman served on the Commerce committee; the Local Government committee, the Economic Growth committee, where he was the ranking member, and on the Economic Development Appropriations Subcommittee.

Hoffman was re-elected in 2006 with 6,297 votes, running unopposed.

== Early life and education ==
Hoffman was born and raised in Leola, South Dakota, the son of John and Christian (née Rath) Hoffman. He graduated from Leola High School and obtained his BS from South Dakota State University.

== Career ==
Outside from his political career, Hoffman was an insurance agent.

== Organizations ==
Hoffman was a member of the following organizations:

- St. John's Lutheran Church
- Independent Insurance Agents of Iowa
- Crawford County Development Committee
- County Risk Management Services

== Personal life and death ==
Hoffman married Lynn Beaudean in 1968 and together they had two children. He and his wife lived in Charter Oak, and later in Denison, Iowa. He died in Denison on February 28, 2025, at the age of 91.

Iowa House of Representatives
Preceded by Don Gries	12th District; 1999–2003	Succeeded by Linda Upmeyer
Preceded by Chuck Larson	55th District; 2003–2009	Succeeded by Jason Schultz
