= Harold C. McCormick =

American politician

Harold McCormick

Member of the Iowa House of Representatives from the 18th district
- In office January 8, 1973 – January 12, 1975
- Preceded by: Kenneth D. Scott
- Succeeded by: Terry Dyrland

Member of the Iowa House of Representatives from the 48th district
- In office January 11, 1971 – January 7, 1973
- Preceded by: Dale Crosier
- Succeeded by: Wayne D. Bennett

Member of the Iowa House of Representatives from the 68th district
- In office January 13, 1969 – January 10, 1971
- Preceded by: James Edward Patton
- Succeeded by: Clair Strand

Personal details
- Born: Harold Charles McCormick; October 8, 1910 Manchester, Iowa
- Died: August 17, 2000 (aged 89) Dubuque, Iowa
- Party: Democratic

Harold Charles McCormick (October 8, 1910 – August 17, 2000) was an American politician.

== Early life ==
Harold McCormick was born to parents Charles and Mary on October 8, 1910. He attended St. Xavier School in his hometown of Manchester, Iowa, then enrolled at Columbia College. McCormick joined the United States Army during World War II, and later worked for the United Service Organization in Alabama, Mississippi, Florida, and Texas before returning to Iowa to work for the local furniture business cofounded by his father. He was a member of several local associations.

== Political career ==
McCormick was a two-term member of the Manchester City Council, and had served on the municipal planning commission for five years before his election to the Iowa House of Representatives in 1968, as a legislator from House District 68. He won reelection twice, from District 48 in 1970, and District 18 in 1972. McCormick was the second Democrat from Delaware County to be seated in the state house. His district was renumbered in each of his three terms, but also included the counties of Buchanan, Clayton, Dubuque, Fayette, and Jones. After McCormick completed his third term as state representative, Robert D. Ray appointed him to the Iowa Capitol Planning Commission, on which McCormick served two terms. The Iowa Legislative Council picked him to serve on the Advisory Commission on Correctional Relief. Ray's successor as governor, Terry Branstad, named McCormick to a task force on drunk driving, as well as the Iowa Board of Corrections on which he served three terms, totaling twelve years. After moving to the city of Dubuque, McCormick was a member of a long-range planning commission for two years.

== Personal life ==
McCormick was married to Doris Marie Kehoe from 1940 to her death in 1964. He married Betty Primus O'Brien in 1967. The family moved to the city of Dubuque in 1988. He died at the Ennoble Manor Care Center in Dubuque on August 17, 2000.
