= Vicki Schwaegler =

American politician

Member of the New Hampshire House of Representatives from the 3rd Grafton district
- In office December 7, 2016 – December 5, 2018
- Preceded by: Susan M. Ford
- Succeeded by: Susan M. Ford

Personal details
- Party: Republican

Victoria "Vicki" Schwaegler is an American politician. She was a member of the New Hampshire House of Representatives and represented Grafton 's 3rd district. She lost the Republican primary in 2018.
