= Darrel Branhagen =

American politician (born 1949)

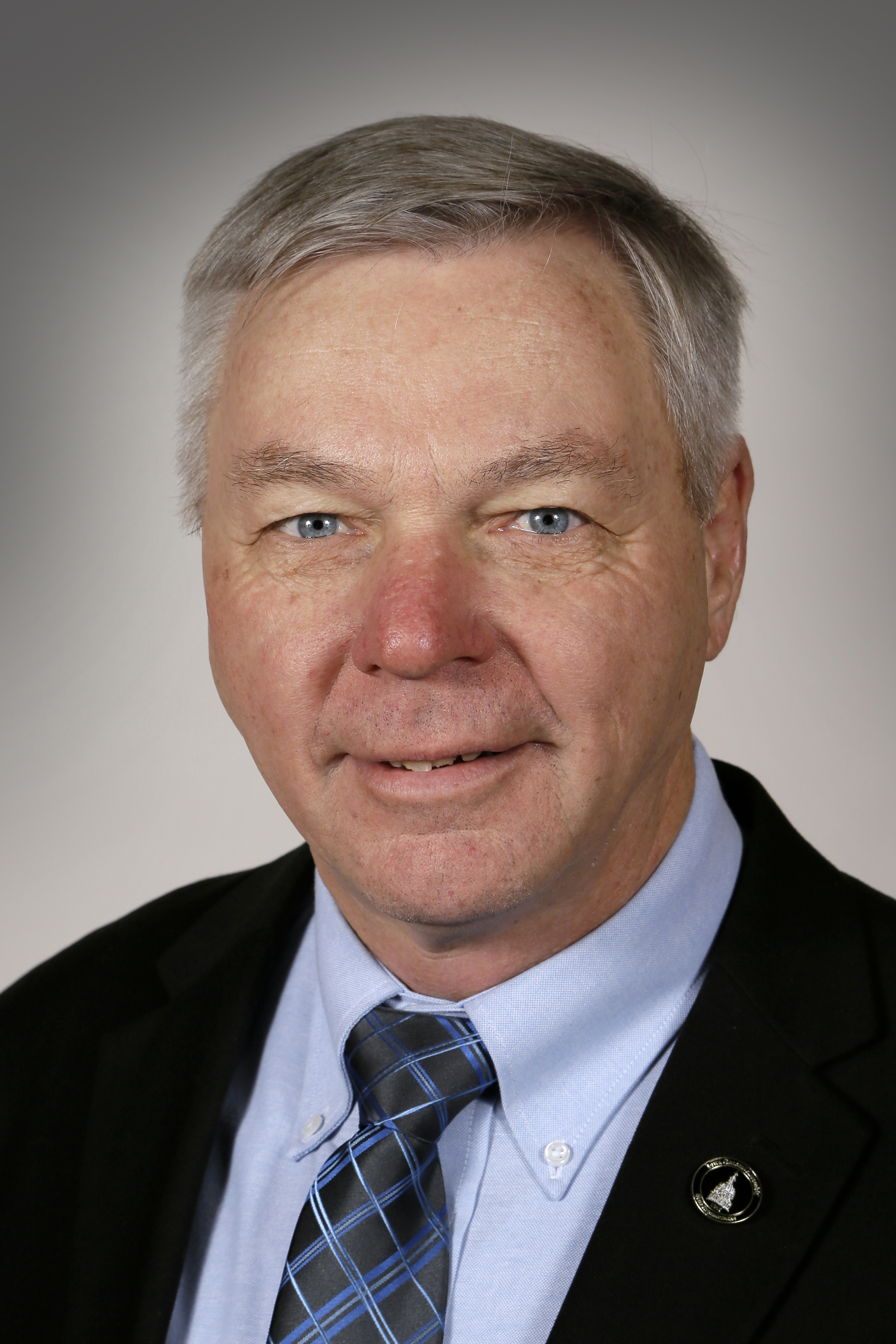

Member of the Iowa House of Representatives from the 55th district
- In office January 12, 2015 – January 9, 2017
- Preceded by: Roger Thomas
- Succeeded by: Michael Bergan

Personal details
- Born: October 23, 1949 (age 76) Decorah, Iowa, U.S.
- Party: Republican
- Spouse: Betty
- Education: Drake University
- Profession: Attorney

Darrel Branhagen (born October 23, 1949) is the Iowa State Representative from the 55th District. A Republican, he has served in the Iowa House of Representatives since 2015.
