= David Lalk =

American politician

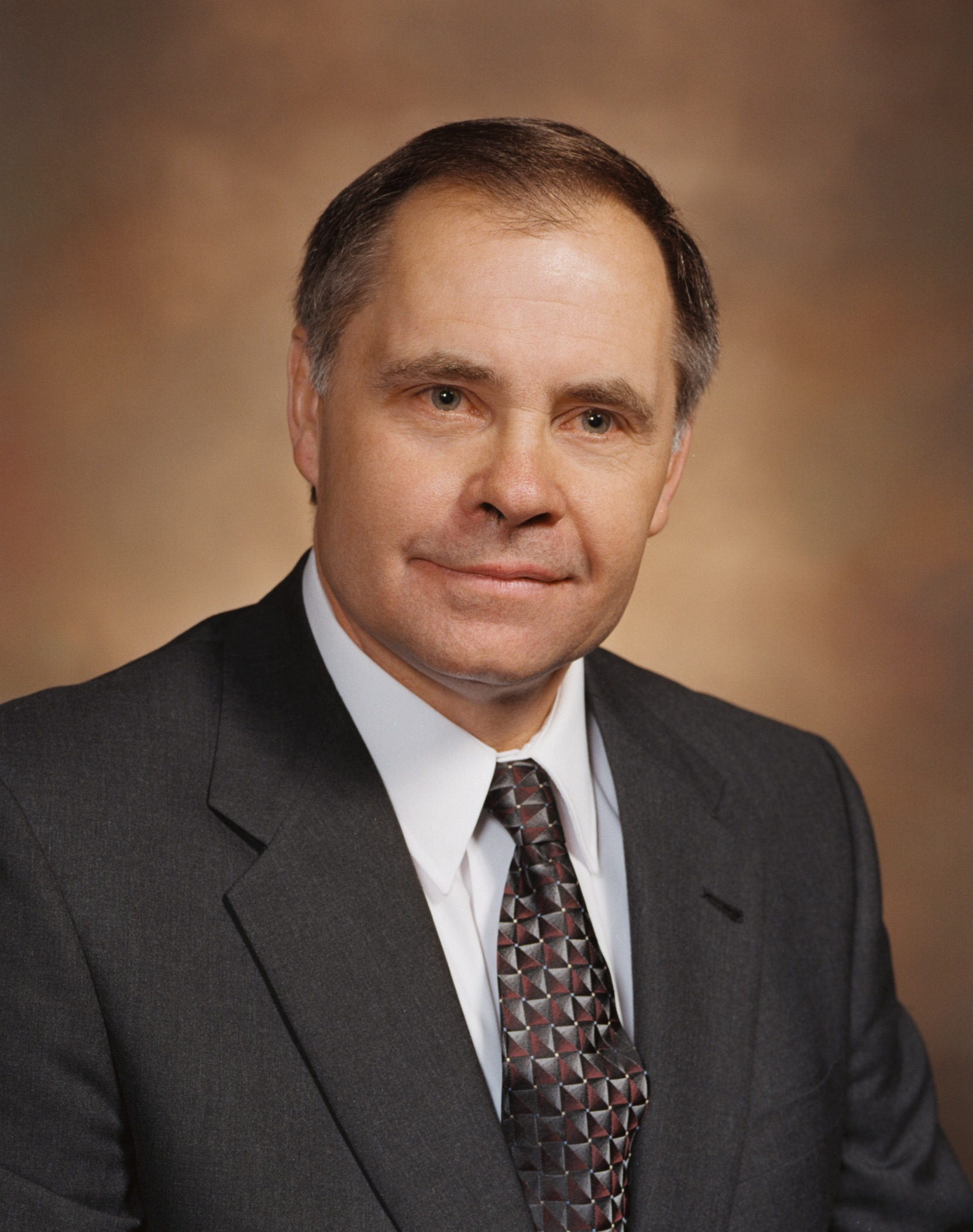

Member of the Iowa House of Representatives
- In office January 13, 2003 – January 7, 2007
- Preceded by: Steven Sukup
- Succeeded by: Andrew Wenthe

Personal details
- Born: October 31, 1948 (age 77) Oelwein, Iowa, United States
- Party: Republican
- Spouse: Debrah
- Children: four
- Occupation: farmer

David Lalk (born October 31, 1948) is an American politician in the state of Iowa.

Lalk was born in Oelwein, Iowa and is a farmer. A Republican, he served in the Iowa House of Representatives from 2003 to 2007 (18th district).
