= Randy Shumway =

Randy W. Shumway
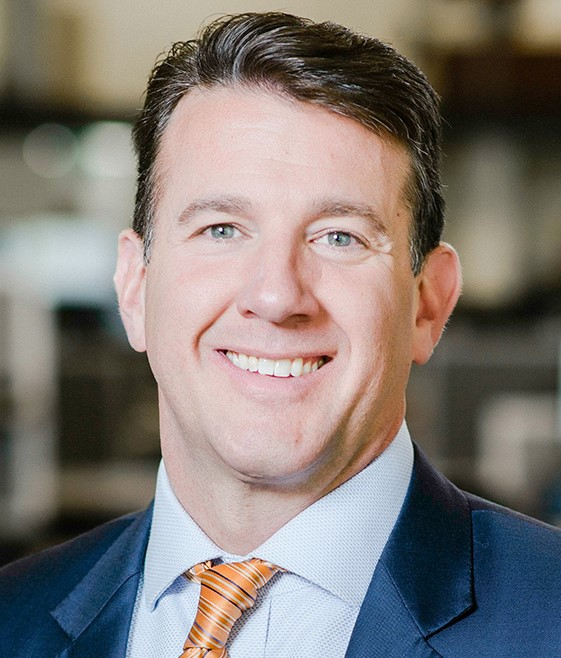
- Randy Shumway in 2024
- Born: November 24, 1971 (age 54); United States
- Education: Harvard Business School
- Occupation: Businessperson
- Known for: Founder and CEO of Cicero Group
- Spouse: Maureen Shumway née Ryder
- Children: 5

Randy Shumway (born November 24, 1971) is an American businessman who is the founder and CEO of Cicero Group, a management consulting firm.

In 2017, he was recognized as CEO of the Year in Utah and received a Lifetime Achievement award from Utah Business. In 2019, Shumway was appointed to the University of Utah Board of Trustees and in 2021 was appointed to the Utah Homelessness Council. Shumway serves on multiple philanthropic as well as corporate boards.

== Early life and education ==
Shumway was born in 1971. He obtained his MBA from Harvard Business School, where he graduated in the top 5% of his class.

== Business career ==
Shumway worked for Bain & Company as a senior associate prior to attending Harvard University.

From 2010 to 2018 Shumway was the economic advisor to Zions Bank From 2012 to 2019 he was an adjunct professor at University of Utah's David Eccles School of Business. He has also served on the board of the Utah Economic Council and the Utah Education Excellence Commission. Shumway was elected to a four-year term (2002–2006) on the Governing Board of the Dublin Unified School District in Alameda County, California.

In early 2001, Shumway started Cicero Group, a data-driven strategy firm. Cicero Group is headquartered in Salt Lake City, Utah, with additional offices in Dallas, Texas, and Washington D.C. The firm has been recognized with a number of awards, including Utah best in state between 2012 and 2017.

== Personal life ==
Shumway is married to the Maureen Ryder, a pediatric nurse practitioner. They are the parents of five.

Shumway writes for the Deseret News and Forbes on business and economic issues.
