= Steven Sukup =

American politician (born 1956)

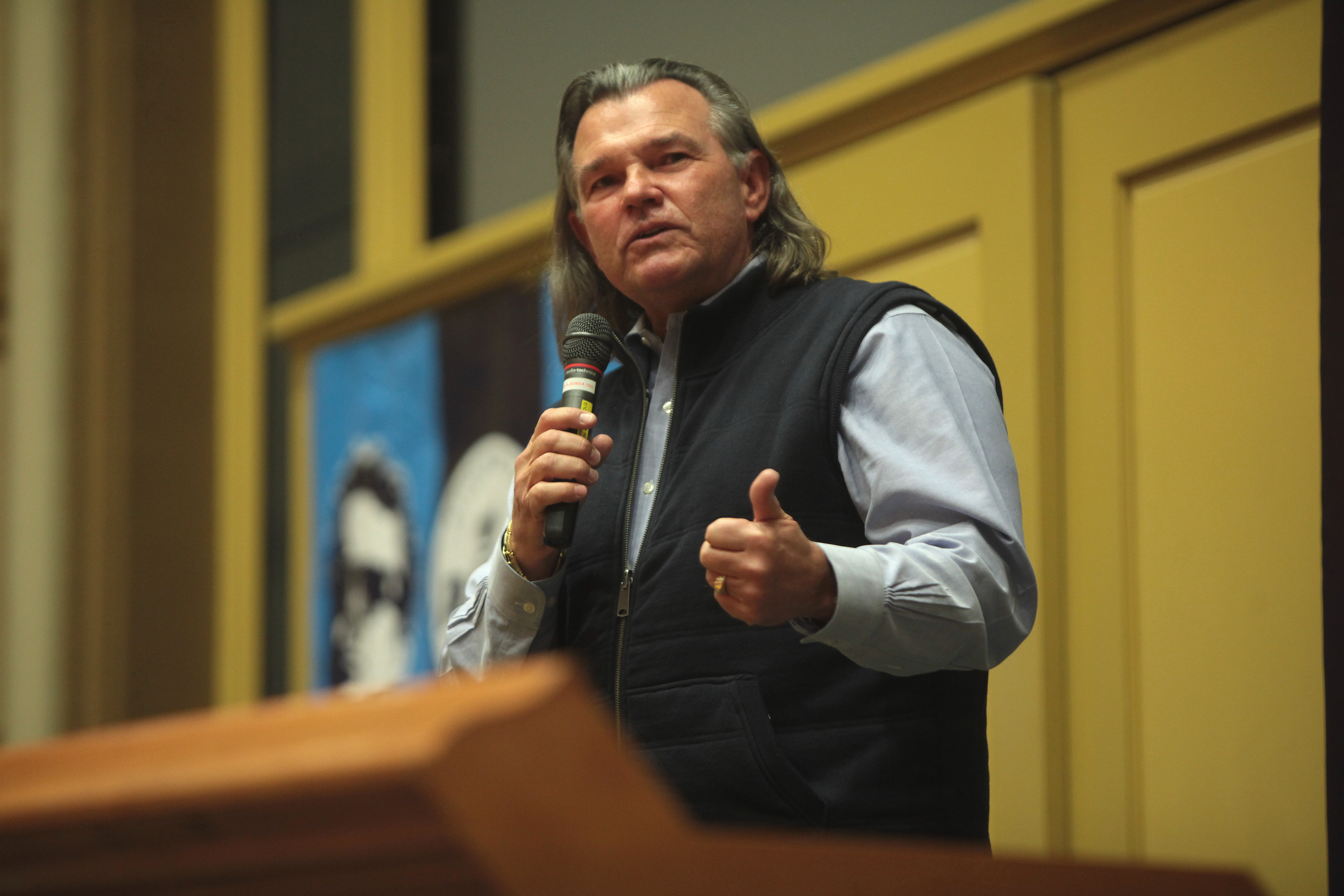

Member of the Iowa House of Representatives from the 18th district
- In office January 9, 1995 – January 12, 2003
- Preceded by: Clark E. McNeal
- Succeeded by: David Lalk

Personal details
- Born: November 4, 1956 (age 69) Sheffield, Iowa, United States
- Party: Republican
- Spouse: Vicki Ann
- Children: 3
- Occupation: Engineer

Steven E. Sukup (born November 4, 1956) is an American politician in the state of Iowa.

Sukup was born in Sheffield, Iowa and attended the Iowa State University. A Republican, he served in the Iowa House of Representatives from 1995 to 2003 (18th district)
