= Andrew Wenthe =

American politician

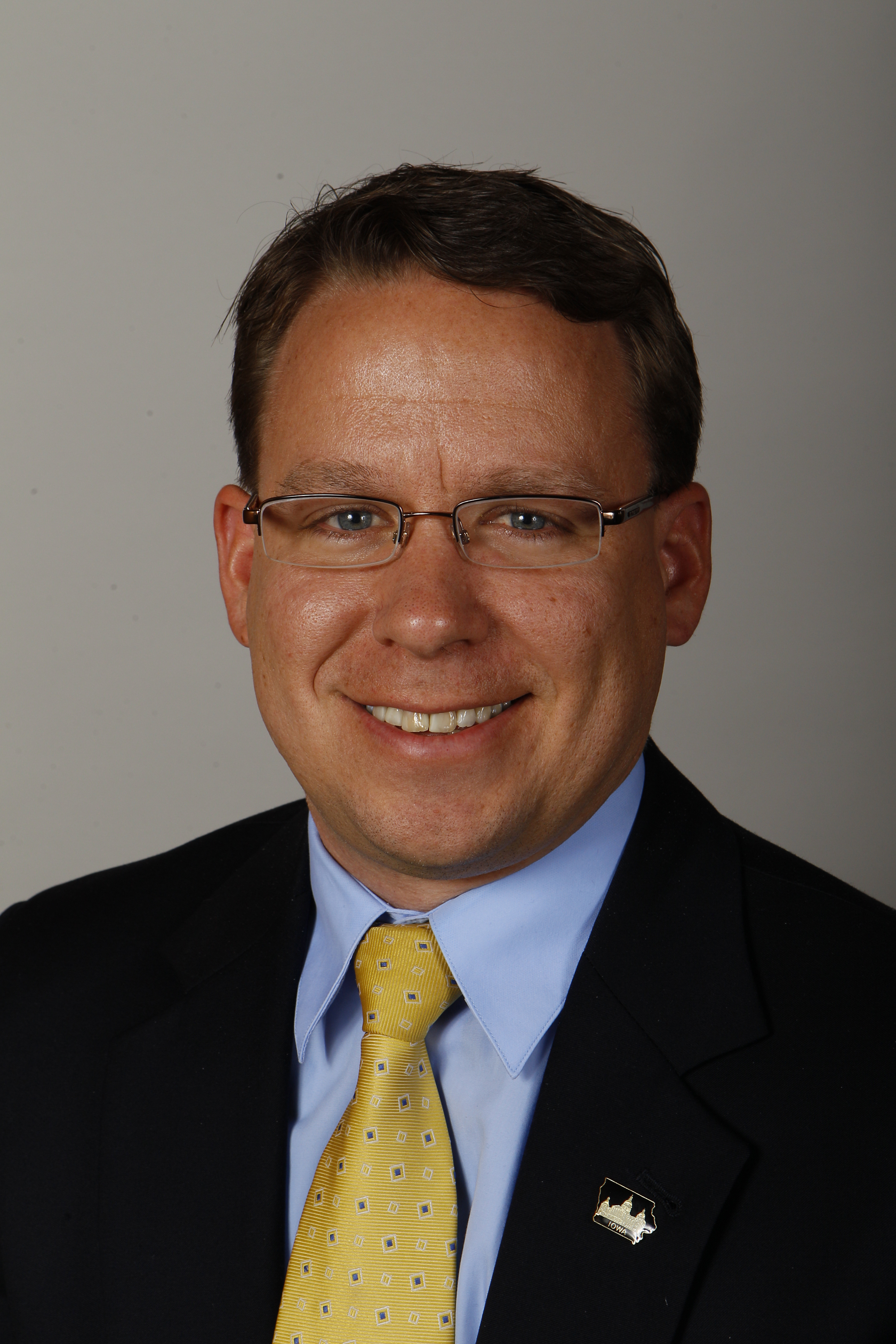

Mayor of Fayette, Iowa
- Incumbent
- Assumed office 2014
- Preceded by: William B. Dohrmann

Member of the Iowa House of Representatives from the 18th district
- In office January 8, 2007 – January, 2013
- Preceded by: David Lalk
- Succeeded by: Jason Schultz

Personal details
- Born: 1977 (age 48–49) West Union, Iowa, U.S.
- Party: Democratic
- Website: Wenthe's website

Andrew J. Wenthe (born 1977) was the Iowa State Representative from the 18th District. He served in the Iowa House of Representatives from 2007 to 2013. He received his BA from the University of Northern Iowa.

During his time in the House, Wenthe was a member of several of its committees: the Administration and Rules, Agriculture, Appropriations, State Government, and Transportation committees. His prior political experience included serving as a legislative assistant for State Senator Jeff Danielson and as legislative staff for Senator Chuck Grassley.

In 2013, he was elected mayor of Fayette, Iowa, with his first term starting in 2014. As of January 2020, he remains mayor.

== Electoral history ==
*incumbent

Election	Political result	Candidate	Party	Votes	%
Iowa House of Representatives elections, 2006; District 18; Turnout: 11,004	Democratic gain from Republican	Andrew Wenthe	Democratic	6,160	56.0
Iowa House of Representatives elections, 2006; District 18; Turnout: 11,004	Democratic gain from Republican	David Lalk*	Republican	4,783	43.5
Iowa House of Representatives elections, 2008; District 18; Turnout: 14,034	Democratic hold	Andrew Wenthe*	Democratic	7,861	56.0
Iowa House of Representatives elections, 2008; District 18; Turnout: 14,034	Democratic hold	Austin Lorenzen	Republican	6,170	44.0
Iowa House of Representatives elections, 2010; District 18; Turnout: 11,230	Democratic hold	Andrew Wenthe*	Democratic	5,499	49.0
Iowa House of Representatives elections, 2010; District 18; Turnout: 11,230	Democratic hold	Roger Arthur	Republican	5,463	48.6

Iowa House of Representatives
Preceded by David Lalk	18th District; 2007 – present	Succeeded by Incumbent
