= Mike Klimesh =

American politician

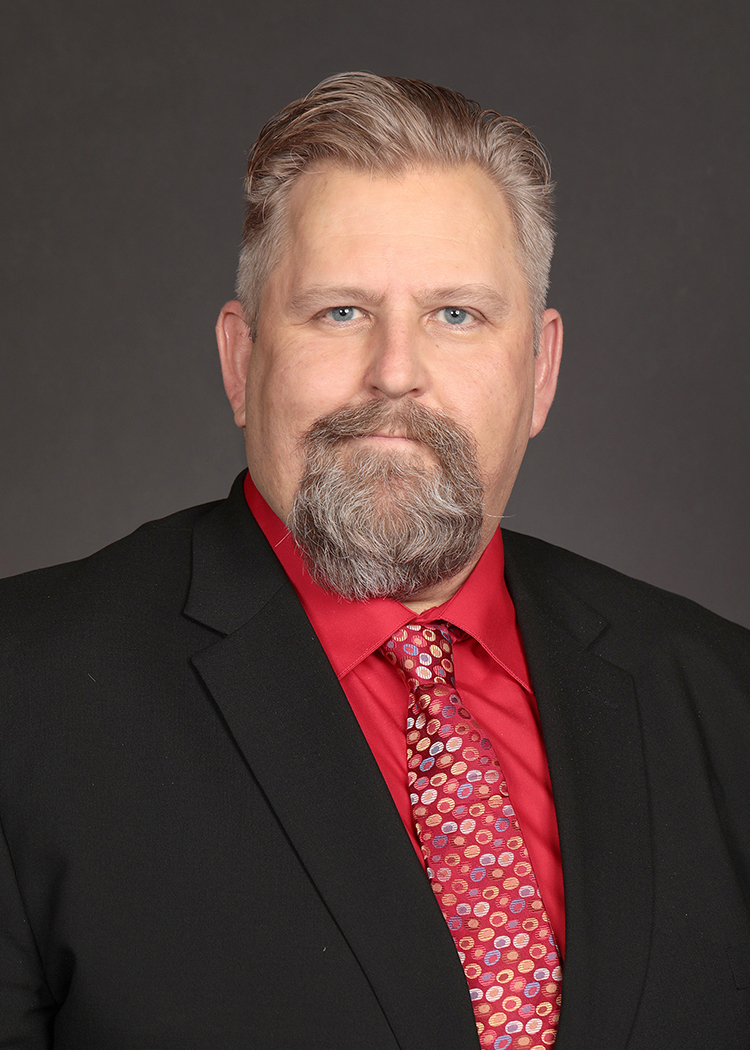

Majority Leader of the Iowa Senate
- Incumbent
- Assumed office September 24, 2025
- Preceded by: Jack Whitver

Member of the Iowa Senate from the 32nd district
- Incumbent
- Assumed office January 11, 2021
- Preceded by: Michael Breitbach
- Constituency: 28th district (2021–2023); 32nd district (2023–present)

Personal details
- Born: Michael Klimesh; 1969 (age 56–57) Decorah, Iowa, U.S.
- Party: Republican
- Spouse: Kate
- Children: 1
- Education: Luther College (BA)

Michael T. "Mike" Klimesh (/ˈklɪmɪʃ/ KLIM-ish; born 1969) is an American politician serving as a member of the Iowa Senate from the 32nd district. Elected in November 2020, he assumed office on January 11, 2021. He is the current Majority Leader of the Iowa Senate.

== Education ==
Klimesh graduated from South Winneshiek High School in Calmar, Iowa and earned a Bachelor of Arts degree in political science from Luther College.

== Career ==
Klimesh served as the mayor of Spillville, Iowa from 2008 to 2020. In 2010 and 2012, he was an unsuccessful candidate for the Iowa House of Representatives. In 2015 and 2016, he worked as a coach at the Northeast Iowa Community College. He was elected to the Iowa Senate in November 2020 and assumed office on January 11, 2021. He also serves as vice chair of the Senate Local Government Committee.

He was elected as the Majority Leader of the Iowa Senate on September 24, 2025.

Klimesh controversially removed Senator Doug Campbell from all of his legislative committee assignments at the beginning of the 2026 Iowa Legislative Session. Multiple Republican County Central Committees, including those in Plymouth, Cerro Gordo, Wright, and Linn counties passed resolutions opposing the move.

Iowa Senate
Preceded by Jack Whitver	Majority Leader of the Iowa Senate; 2025–present	Incumbent
