= Ace Communication Group =

Coordinates: 43°45′48.1″N 91°34′1.36″W

AcenTek
- Formerly: Ace Telephone, Ace Communications Group
- Type: Utility cooperative
- Industry: Telecommunications; Internet service provider Digital television
- Founded: 1950
- Headquarters: Houston, Minnesota, United States
- Website: AcenTek

Ace Telephone Association, doing business as Acentek, is a telephone cooperative based out of Houston, Minnesota. It is a telephone company which also offers local and long distance phone service through VoIP, as well as internet services, e-mail services, and digital TV service; it operates in small towns and rural areas throughout the upper midwestern United States. It serves parts of Houston, Fillmore, and Winona Counties in Minnesota; in Iowa, it serves parts of Allamakee, Winneshiek, and Fayette Counties. It also owns and operates Ace Telephone Company of Michigan, Inc., in Mesick, Michigan serving northwestern Michigan in the Wexford, Manistee and Benzie County region, along with South Boardman, Michigan. It also operates in Allendale, Michigan serving Michigan in the Ottawa region. In addition, it also operates Ace Link Telecommunications, Inc., which serves the city of Caledonia, Minnesota.

As an Internet service provider, it also has non-telephone customers within its local dialing area. For internet service, in some parts, especially rural ones, it is the only ISP available. In addition, it provides internet and VoIP services to select areas through a fiber-optical network. In many areas, Ace still operates digital subscriber lines (DSL) over old copper phone lines.

It was formed in 1950 as a rural cooperative to improve telephone service in Fillmore County, Minnesota. It subsequently absorbed a number of other small providers. In 1956 it adopted the "Ace" name, however in 2014, the cooperative changed their consumer-facing name to "AcenTek", a combination of the words ascending and technology. Ace, however, is still used as a nickname from time to time. Currently, it has over 24,000 subscribers.

AcenTek also has a non-profit foundation, the AcenTek Foundation, which exists to provide funds for various purposes.

== Service area ==
=== Iowa ===
- Castalia
- Clermont
- Fort Atkinson
- Harpers Ferry
- Highlandville
- New Albin
- Ossian
- Waterville

=== Michigan ===
- Buckley
- Copemish
- Hoxeyville
- Mesick
- South Boardman
- Thompsonville
- Old Mission
- Allendale
- Coopersville
- Grand Haven
- Hudsonville
- Jenison
- West Olive
- Zeeland

=== Minnesota ===
- Brownsville
- Canton
- Dakota
- Eitzen
- Granger
- Hokah
- Houston
- La Crescent
- Lanesboro
- Ostrander
- Peterson
- Rushford
- Caledonia
