= Iowa Department of Public Safety =

Agency in the US state of Iowa

- State Seal of Iowa

- State flag of Iowa

Mission: "To serve the people of Iowa by providing public safety services with leadership, integrity, and professionalism."

Website: https://dps.iowa.gov/

The Iowa Department of Public Safety (DPS) is a state law enforcement agency of Iowa, headquartered in the Oran Pape State Office building, located at 215 E. 7th Street in Des Moines.

The department comprises several divisions, including the Iowa State Patrol, the State Fire marshal, and the Iowa Division of Criminal Investigation. The chief executive of the agency is the Commissioner, who is appointed by the Iowa Governor and confirmed by the Iowa Senate. The current commissioner is Stephen Bayens.

Through the Iowa State Patrol, the Iowa Department of Public Safety is responsible for promoting highway safety by enforcing traffic laws, investigating crashes, and patrolling state highways, interstates, and public roads. The department is responsible for protecting the Iowa State Capitol, state government buildings, the Iowa Governor's mansion (Terrace Hill), and providing protection to the governor.

Through the Iowa Division of Criminal Investigation (DCI), the Iowa Department of Public Safety is also responsible for conducting statewide criminal investigations, handling major crimes, and operating the state crime laboratory. The DCI is responsible for the Iowa Missing Persons Information Clearinghouse, the Iowa Sex Offender Registry and is also responsible for ensuring public trust in the Iowa gaming industry by conducting criminal investigations and enforcement activity related to casino gaming and pari-mutuel wagering in the state.

Through the Iowa State Fire Marshal Division, the Iowa Department of Public Safety is responsible for investigating fires, arson, and explosions. This division has a number of special agents that are certified bomb technicians. The Fire Training Service Bureau (FTSB) is responsible for providing training to over 800 fire departments in the State of Iowa.

Through the Iowa Division of Narcotics Enforcement (DNE), the Iowa Department of Public Safety is responsible for enforcing state controlled substance laws, investigating and suppressing illicit drug trafficking, and regulating the legal use of prescription medications.

The agencies of the Iowa DPS frequently coordinate with and support law enforcement activity and investigations with local police departments, the 99 Iowa County Sheriffs' offices, and federal law enforcement agencies.

== History of the Iowa Department of Public Safety ==
The Department of Public Safety was created in 1939 by the Iowa 48th General Assembly. It was established by consolidating several existing agencies under one department. Those agencies were the State Fire Marshal's Office (created in 1911), the Bureau of Criminal Investigation (created in 1921), and the Iowa State Highway Patrol (created in 1935).

== Organization & Personnel ==
The Department of Public Safety is comprised of seven divisions, six bureaus, and the Office of the Commissioner. The seven divisions are:

- Iowa State Patrol
- Division of Criminal Investigation
- Division of Intelligence & Fusion Center
- Division of Narcotics Enforcement
- State Fire Marshal Division
- Administrative Services Division
- Division of Professional Development and Support Services

The Bureaus of the Iowa Department of Public Safety are:

- Govenor's Traffic Safety Bureau
- Govenor's School Safety Bureau
- Office of Drug Control Policy
- Professional Standards Bureau
- Interoperability Communications Bureau
- Strategic Communications Bureau

The Office of the Commissioner includes the Executive Officer to the Commissioner, the Executive Secretary, Legal Counsel, and a Legislative Liaison.

The Iowa Department of Public Safety's employees consist of both sworn (law enforcement) personnel and non-sworn (professional, technical, scientific, and clerical staff) personnel. Sworn personnel, such as Iowa State Troopers, Iowa Division of Criminal Investigation (DCI) special agents, Division of Narcotics Enforcement (DNE) special agents, and State Fire Marshal Division special agents attend basic training at the DPS Basic Training Academy located at Camp Dodge in Johnston, Iowa. The academy is 20 weeks long.

== Commissioner ==
The Iowa Commissioner of Public Safety is the Chief executive officer of the Iowa Department of Public Safety, responsible for overseeing the department's operations, administration, and law enforcement responsibilities as established under Iowa Code Chapter 80.

The Public Safety Commissioner is a full-time, paid position and the incumbent may not hold any other employment while serving in this role. The Commissioner is appointed by the Iowa Governor and his or her appointment must be confirmed by the Iowa Senate. The Commissioner serves at the pleasure of the governor and must be appointed for his or her possession of executive and law enforcement administrative capabilities. Iowa state law says the commissioner must not be selected on the basis of political affiliation and the Commissioner cannot engage in any partisan or political activity while in office.

The Iowa Public Safety Commissioner reports to the Govenor of Iowa. The current Commissioner is Stephan Bayens.

== List of Iowa Public Safety Commissioners ==
- Karl F. Fischer, 1939 - 1943
- Alfred W. Kahl, 1947 - 1950
- Pearl Wayland McMurry, 1950 - 1955
- Clinton H. Moyer, 1955 - 1959
- Gene L. Needles, 1966
- Jack M Fulton, 1967 - 1971
- Charles W. Larson, Sr., 1974 - 1980
- E.A. "Penny" Westfall, 1999 - 2002
- Kevin W. Techau, 2002 - 2007
- Eugene T. Meyer, 2007-2011
- Larry Noble (politician), 2011 - 2012
- K. Brian London, 2012 - 2013
- Larry Noble (politician), 2013 - 2015
- Roxann Ryan, 2015 - 2021
- Stephan K. Bayens, 2021 - present
