= Urban Hageman =

American politician (1929–1965)

Urban Frederick Hageman (August 23, 1929 – October 10, 1965) was an American politician.

Urban Hageman was born to parents Ignatius and Elizabeth Hageman on August 23, 1929. After attending school in Calmar, Iowa, Hageman enrolled in an agriculture program and took short courses at Iowa State University. He served in the Panama Canal Zone during the Korean War. Upon his return to the United States, Hageman and his family lived successively in Calmar, Cresco, and Canoe Township.

Hageman was elected as a Democrat to District 91 of the Iowa House of Representatives in November 1964, defeating incumbent Hillman Howard Sersland. Hageman took office on January 11, 1965, and died later that year on October 10, while working on Lee Schissel's farm in Canoe Township.
