= Conover, Iowa =

- Ghost town
- Location within Iowa
- Coordinates: 43°12′55″N 91°53′41″W
- Country: United States
- State: Iowa
- County: Winneshiek
- Elevation: 1,227 ft (374 m)
- Time zone: UTC-6 (CST)
  - Summer (DST): UTC-5 (CDT)
- ZIP code: 52132
- Area code(s): 319, 563
- GNIS feature ID: 1941391
- FIPS code: 19-19191

Conover is a ghost town located in Winneshiek County, Iowa, United States. It appears on the Fort Atkinson quadrangle of the United States Geological Survey topographic map and has been subsumed within the U.S. Postal Service ZIP code of nearby Calmar.

== History ==
Conover was a cow pasture until September 1864, when news arrived that the westward-growing railroad would pass through the area, at which time a village was quickly plotted from local farmland during a two-week period. Rails laid by the McGregor Western Railroad Company reached Conover, through Calmar, in August 1865, by which time the village contained more than 200 buildings, including over 32 saloons and as many produce markets.

They are building the railroad near Conover. Mr. Pushusta took his team of horses and helped them. He took us with his team and wagon over to see where they are building. A lot of other farmers were there to help with their horses.

— Marie "Mary" Andera, Diary, April 1866, Spillville, Iowa

In 1865, Cargill (now the largest privately held company in America) was first started in Conover when William Wallace Cargill left his family home in Janesville, Wisconsin, and purchased a grain flat house in Conover, Iowa. The flat house, a type of warehouse that preceded country elevators, was at the end of the McGregor & Western Railroad line. This was the first business in a long line of agriculture-based businesses that would build the huge Cargill empire.

By 1866, the village boasted 1200-1500 inhabitants, many of whom had migrated from nearby Calmar. David Noggle presented a petition for incorporation of Conover into a town, and County Judge G. R. Wellett issued the order of incorporation on 17 October 1866. In 1867, Capt. V. C. Jacobs was elected the first (and only) mayor of Conover. Town Councilmen included Col. G. D. Pagent, Charles Sydan, and probably Capt. George Q. Gardner, but detailed town records were destroyed in a subsequent fire. The election expenses exceeded the capacity of the town treasury, and township clerk J. J. Haug took assignment of the accounts, but the expenses remained unpaid.

Growth of the railroad continued to the north and west, drawing business away from the new town of Conover, and in 1868 Calmar became the eastern terminus and junction with the main line for the I & D branch of the Chicago, Milwaukee and St. Paul Railroad. In 1869 a branch line from Conover to Decorah was completed, and Robert Jameson became the first conductor. In the same year, the Conover terminal was transferred to Calmar, including the railroad depot, freight house, and side tracks. A large fire further damaged Conover, and many inhabitants (and buildings) moved back to Calmar. By 1870, most of the lots in Conover had returned to cropland, but the 1880 census still reported a population of 168.

Conover buildings huddle down the railroad track a half-hour walk – a town that somehow got cheated out of great expectations.

— Marie "Mary" Andera, Diary, 5 March 1884, Spillville, Iowa

The Conover Post Office, established in 1865, closed in 1916.

Railroad cars were still checked in Conover until the yards closed in the late 1940s. Anna Becvar (née Vondersitt) was the last Conover railroad agent. The population was 49 in 1940.

== Education ==
Conover is within the South Winneshiek Community School District.
