= Walter Langland =

American politician (born 1927)

Walter Vincent Langland

Member of the Iowa House of Representatives
- In office 1967–1971

Personal details
- Born: September 16, 1927 (age 98) Winneshiek County, Iowa, U.S.
- Party: Republican
- Occupation: dairy farmer

Walter Vincent Langland (born September 16, 1927) is an American retired politician in the state of Iowa.

Langland was born in Winneshiek County, Iowa. He was a dairy farmer. He served in the Iowa House of Representatives from 1967 to 1971 as a Republican.
