= Larry Noble =

Larry Noble may refer to:

- Larry Noble (politician)
- Larry Noble (actor)
