= Jack Whitver =

American politician, football player and businessman (born 1980)

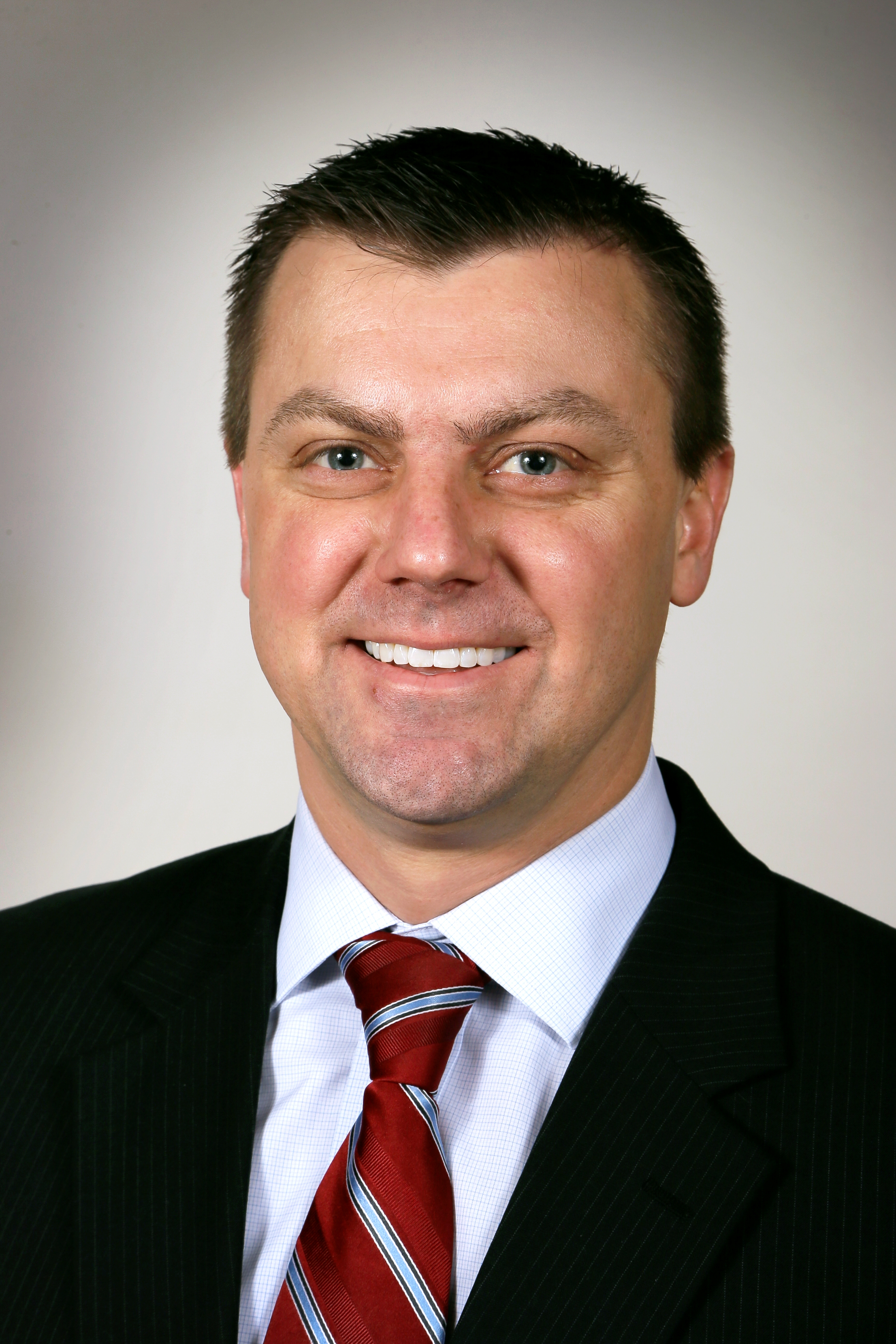

Majority Leader of the Iowa Senate
- In office March 14, 2018 – September 24, 2025
- Preceded by: Bill Dix
- Succeeded by: Mike Klimesh

President of the Iowa Senate
- In office January 9, 2017 – March 15, 2018
- Preceded by: Pam Jochum
- Succeeded by: Charles Schneider

Member of the Iowa Senate
- Incumbent
- Assumed office January 24, 2011
- Preceded by: Larry Noble
- Succeeded by: Wes Enos (elect)
- Constituency: 35th district (2011–2013); 19th district (2013–2023); 23rd district (2023–present)

Personal details
- Born: Jack Andrew Whitver; September 4, 1980 (age 46) Knoxville, Iowa, U.S.
- Party: Republican
- Spouse: Rachel Lea (m. 2007)
- Children: 3
- Education: Iowa State University (BS, MBA); Drake University (JD)

Jack Andrew Whitver (born September 4, 1980) is an American businessman and politician, who is currently the Iowa State Senator for the 23rd District. He is the former Majority Leader and President of the Senate.

== Early life ==
Whitver was born in Knoxville in 1980.

He graduated from Grinnell Highschool in 1999. He attended Iowa State University and received his BS in exercise science in 2003 and his Masters in 2003. He played college football for Iowa State, starting at wide receiver. He attended Drake Law School for his Juris Doctor starting in 2009 and graduating in 2012. In 2010, he was named to the Drake Law Review.

== Business career ==
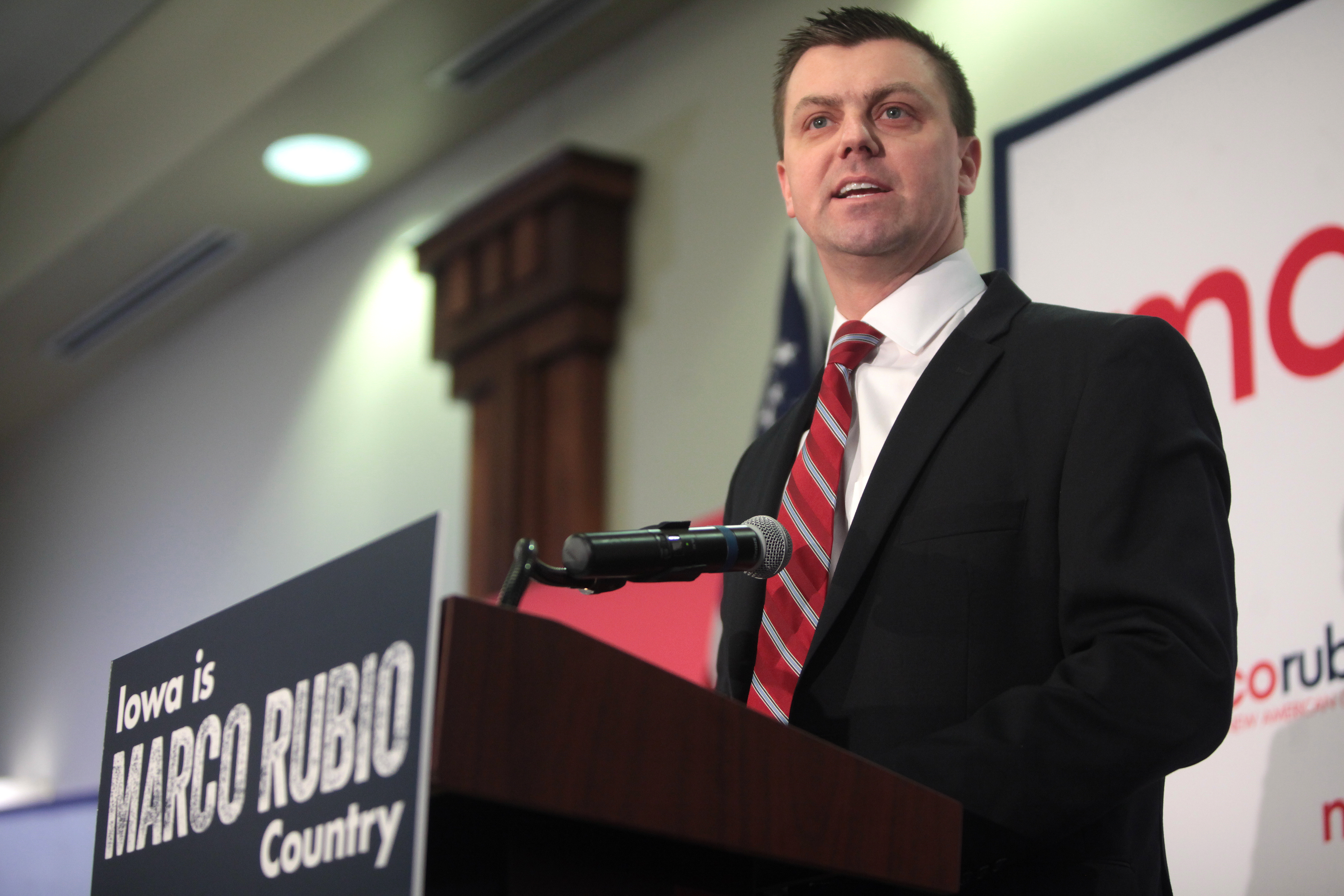
Whitver campaigning for Marco Rubio in 2016

Whitver founded Acceleration Iowa in 2004, in Urbandale, with business partner Geoff Jensen. They added new locations in 2007, in Waukee, and 2013, in Ankeny. Acceleration Iowa is a sports training business, which develops speed, quickness and overall athletic ability for young athletes.

In 2012, Whitver bought CrossFit Des Moines and CrossFit Waukee and opened North Ankeny CrossFit.

Whitver was an assistant coach (wide receivers and offensive coordinator) for the Iowa Barnstormers of the Arena Football League from 2008 to 2011.

Whitver is also an attorney with the Des Moines law firm Whitaker Hagenow & Gustoff starting in 2013.

== Political career ==
Whitver ran in the 2011 Special Election for District 35 due to Larry Noble resigning to become the Commissioner of the Iowa Department of Public Safety. He ran against John Calhoun and was elected to the Iowa State Senate on January 18, 2011. District 35 covered Ankeny, Johnston, Grimes, Polk City and the entire northern part of Polk County.

Whitver was sworn into the Iowa Senate on January 24, 2011, and was named to the Judiciary, Economic Growth and Human Resource committees.

After the redistricting of 2012, Whitver began representing District 19 in the State Senate, which covered Ankeny, Alleman, Saylor Township, and a small part of Des Moines.

In 2013 Whitver was named Ranking Member of the Appropriations Committee as well as serving on the Economic Growth, Ethics, Human Resource, Judiciary and State Government committees.

In 2014, he ran against Brett H. Nelson, another Republican, in both the primary and general election. He beat Nelson both times and was re-elected to his second term.

In 2015, Whitver became the Minority Whip and was named member of the Government Oversight, Judiciary, Labor and Business Relations, Rules and Administration and State Government committees.

On January 9, 2017, Senator Bill Dix nominated Whitver to be President of the Senate. He was elected unanimously and sworn in by Iowa Chief Justice Mark S. Cady. He was named as Vice Chair of the Rules and Administration Committee.

In 2018, he ran against Brett H. Nelson, again, in the primary and won. He ran against Amber Gustafson and was re-elected to his third term. He was named as Vice Chair of the Rules and Administration Committee and as a member of the Appropriations Committee. He served until March 15, 2018, as President of the Senate and then became the Majority Leader.

On January 19, 2019, his children recited the Pledge of Allegiance to start the session. He was named as Chair of the Rules and Administration Committee.

After redistricting in 2022, Whitver ran to represent District 23. He ran unopposed in the Republican primary, winning 3,629 votes. He then ran against Matt Pries and won his fourth term.

He is currently, as of September 2025, Chair of the Rules and Administration Committee. On September 24, 2025, he stepped down when Senator Mike Klimesh was elected leader.

== Personal life ==
He married Rachel Anne Lea in May 2007, and they have three children. They attend Lutheran Church of Hope in West Des Moines. They resided in Ankeny until 2023 when they moved to Grimes.

In May 2024, Whitver announced that he was diagnosed with a brain tumor, a month prior, and is responding well to radiation treatment.

== Electoral history ==
2011 Iowa 35th District Senate Special Election Results
Party	Candidate	Votes	%	±%
Republican	Jack Whitver	4,773	63.47%	
Democratic Party (United States)	John Calhoun	2,739	36.42%	
	Under Votes and Scattering	8	0.2%	
Turnout		7,520	100%	

2014 Iowa 19th District Senate Primary Election Results
Party	Candidate	Votes	%	±%
Republican	Jack Whitver	2,362	63.32%	
Republican Party (United States)	Brett H. Nelson	635	17.02%	
	Under Votes and Scattering	733	19.65%	
Turnout		3,730	100%	

2014 Iowa 19th District Senate General Election Results
Party	Candidate	Votes	%	±%
Republican	Jack Whitver	16,742	62.46%	
Republican Party (United States)	Brett H. Nelson	3,802	14.18%	
	Under Votes and Scattering	6,260	23.35%	
Turnout		26,804	100%	

2018 Iowa 19th District Senate Primary Election Results
Party	Candidate	Votes	%	±%
Republican	Jack Whitver	1,369	75.21%	
Republican Party (United States)	Brett H. Nelson	326	17.91%	
	Under Votes and Scattering	125	6.86%	
Turnout		1,820	100%	

2018 Iowa 19th District Senate General Election Results
Party	Candidate	Votes	%	±%
Republican	Jack Whitver	18,598	50.24%	
Democratic Party (United States)	Amber Gustafson	17,608	47.56%	
	Under Votes and Scattering	812	2.19%	
Turnout		37,018	100%	

2022 Iowa 23rd District Senate Primary Election Results
Party	Candidate	Votes	%	±%
Republican	Jack Whitver	3,629	84.03%	
	Write-in and Under votes	690	15.97%	
Turnout		4,319	100%	

2022 Iowa 23rd District Senate General Election Results
Party	Candidate	Votes	%	±%
Republican	Jack Whitver	17,276	56.99%	
Democratic Party (United States)	Matt Pries	12,159	40.13%	
	Write-in, Under and Over votes	874	2.88%	
Turnout		30,309	100%	

Iowa Senate
Preceded by Pam Jochum	President of the Iowa Senate; 2017–2018	Succeeded by Charles Schneider
Preceded by Bill Dix	Majority Leader of the Iowa Senate; 2018–2025	Succeeded by Mike Klimesh
