= Waverly stranglings =

Unsolved series of murders

Waverly strangler
- Other name: "The Waverly Three"

Details
- Victims: 3
- Span of crimes: 1971–1976
- Country: United States
- State: Iowa

The Waverly stranglings refers to three unsolved murders committed from 1971 to 1976, with the victims being a teenage girl and two young women who lived in Waverly, Iowa. Due to the fact that all victims were killed in similar circumstances, news media has speculated that this possibly was the work of a serial killer.

To this day, the murders remain cold cases, with nobody having been arrested or charged in relation in any of them.

== Murders ==
=== Valerie Klossowsky ===
On the evening of June 13, 1971, 14-year-old Valerie Lynn Klossowsky was reported missing by family members after she failed to return home. Her whereabouts remained unknown until two days later, when two young boys walking around a gravel road spotted her partially-unclothed body underneath a bridge close to the nearby town of Denver. The body was taken to the Conway-Perry Funeral Home in New Hampton, where it was positively identified as Valerie's by her father.

The day after this discovery, Bremer County district attorney Richard "Dick" Kemming stated that according to a preliminary coroner's report, Klossowsky had been strangled to death, but it was currently unknown whether she had been sexually assaulted. Following this reveal, at least seven agencies across the state began an investigation into the murder, with local officials asking for help from the public to gather tips about the killer(s). While there were no suspects who were immediately identified, neighbors reported that a possible prowler had been spotted skulking around the area the day after Klossowsky had been reported missing.

It was determined that on the day she had disappeared, Klossowsky had had a picnic with a friend named LuAnn Hicks at a park in Waverly, remaining together until the afternoon. Reportedly, she later went to Hicks' house to ask her to accompany her for the rest of the night, but as she was not home, Klossowsky had left and instead went to the local swimming pool with another friend, Cindy Newgren. Newgren later claimed that she had seen Klossowsky talking to a group of people outside the pool and that she was told to go inside by Valerie, only to find her swimming suit and towel outside when she went to check on her.

On June 23, investigators publicly admitted that they had exhausted most of their leads and had no viable suspects for a potential arrest. Approximately a month after the slaying, it was reported that they had investigated as many as 150 people – some as many as five times.

=== Julia Benning ===
On December 4, 1975, the parents of 18-year-old Julia Ann Benning reported her missing, as the young woman was last seen alive four days prior on Bremer Avenue in Waverly, where she was walking to her workplace, the Sir Lounge. Initially, authorities stated that they were treating this simply as a missing persons case due to the fact that Benning was of legal age and there was no indication there was a crime at this point in time. On December 11, a body found on a dirt road near Oelwein which was initially thought to be her was identified as that of 16-year-old Sheila Foley, who was the victim of an unrelated homicide case.

On March 18, 1976, four months after she was reported missing, Benning's badly-decomposed body was found in a culvert near Shell Rock by local maintenance worker Roscoe Hulbert. Due to the fact that she was found completely nude, suspicions immediately grew that she had been murdered, leading to a joint investigation by police in Waverly and nearby Butler County. Two days after the discovery, comparisons were already drawn to the earlier unsolved murder of Klossowsky, who was found in suspiciously similar circumstances.

The first autopsy conducted on Benning's body led to inconclusive results, leading to the scheduling of a second autopsy at a later date. On March 30, while investigators were still awaiting completion of the findings, they received an anonymous letter that supposedly contained substantial leads about the case, but had incomplete information. Law enforcement officers requested that the writer of this letter to contact them as soon as possible.

On April 2, Butler County Attorney Gene Shepard reported that the lab results from Benning's second autopsy were complete, and that they would be discussed with pathologist Dr. James Collins prior to them being released to the public. On April 13, Shepard released a statement to the public confirming that Benning had been strangled to death, but withheld other information, saying that it would hamper their investigation. The day after Shepard's statement was released, the anonymous letter writer mailed a second letter, but as the information provided was still not considered enough, the Bremer County Sheriff's Office renewed their appeal for the writer to contact them for further questioning.

=== Marie Peak ===
On September 6, 1976, 19-year-old sophomore university student Marie Lisa Peak was reported missing by her friends after she failed to return from a shopping trip back to her dorm at the Wartburg College. A day later, her nude body was found in a cornfield by farmer John Anhalt and one of his neighbors, who immediately reported the finding to the police. The area was searched by responding officers and auxiliaries, who collected various trash and cans as potential evidence.

While a cause of death could not be immediately determined, it was initially speculated that her death might be related to Peak's role in the conviction of sextortionist John Carmody Jr., a 36-year-old car salesman from Mason City who was sentenced to 40 years imprisonment for blackmailing women into doing sexual favors by claiming to be a member of the Mafia. Reportedly, Peak was working on a book about her role in the case together with a reporter from The Des Moines Register and was intent on confronting Carmody to show him that she was not afraid of him.

On September 9, an autopsy officially confirmed that Peak had been beaten, sexually assaulted, and later suffocated to death after her neck was broken by her killer. This led to public speculation about who was responsible for her murder, which alternated between her being killed in retaliation for her role in exposing Carmody's sextortion scheme to being the latest victim of whoever had killed Klossowsky and Benning. One article posted in The Des Moines Register suggested that the Benning and Peak murders might be related by the fact that both women had been killed after going out to purchase shoes.

On September 14, Tom Hopewell, deputy director of the Iowa Division of Criminal Investigation, released a statement in which he dispelled rumors that police had a suspect in the case, and admitted that there were very few viable leads in her murder. Four days later, the Bremer County Banker's Association announced that they were offering a $5,000 reward for anyone who could provide pertinent information leading to an arrest in the Peak case.

== Investigation and current status ==
In 2015, an article was published in The Des Moines Register focusing on the life and murder of Julia Benning, featuring an interview with her family members and possible theories about who was responsible. In the article, the connection to the murders of Klossowsky and Peak is mentioned, with one detective from the local sheriff's department stating his belief that the cases were indeed connected.

== See also ==
- List of serial killers in the United States
