= Hillman Howard Sersland =

American politician (1906–1985)

Hillman Howard Sersland (August 10, 1906 – October 21, 1985) was an American politician.

Hillman Sersland was born to parents Halvor and Malla Brown Sersland, and had eight younger siblings. He attended rural school in Winneshiek County and took courses at Luther College until 1926. Sersland began selling farming equipment in 1930, and was active in the Winneshiek County Farm Bureau and the local Lutheran church. He married Decorah native Irene W. Olson in 1929, with whom he raised three children: Howard, Walter, and Marilyn.

Sersland was first elected to the Iowa House of Representatives as a Republican in 1952, and served continuously for District 91 until 1965, when he was defeated by Urban Hageman.

Sersland died on October 21, 1985, at his son Howard's home in Decorah.
