= Louise M. Weiser =

American businesswoman

Louise M. Weiser (c. 1837–1898) became president of Winnesheik County Bank in 1875. She was the first woman to serve as president of an American bank.

== Biography ==
Weiser was born in Vermont. She married Horace Weiser around 1860 and moved to Decorah, Iowa.

Horace was founder and president of Winnesheik County Bank. Upon Horace's death in 1875, Louise assumed the role of bank president making her the first woman in the United States to hold such a position. Her son, C.S. Weiser became president of the bank in 1892.
