= Bily Clocks Museum =

Museum in Spillville, Iowa

Coordinates: 43°12′6.91″N 91°57′4.695″W

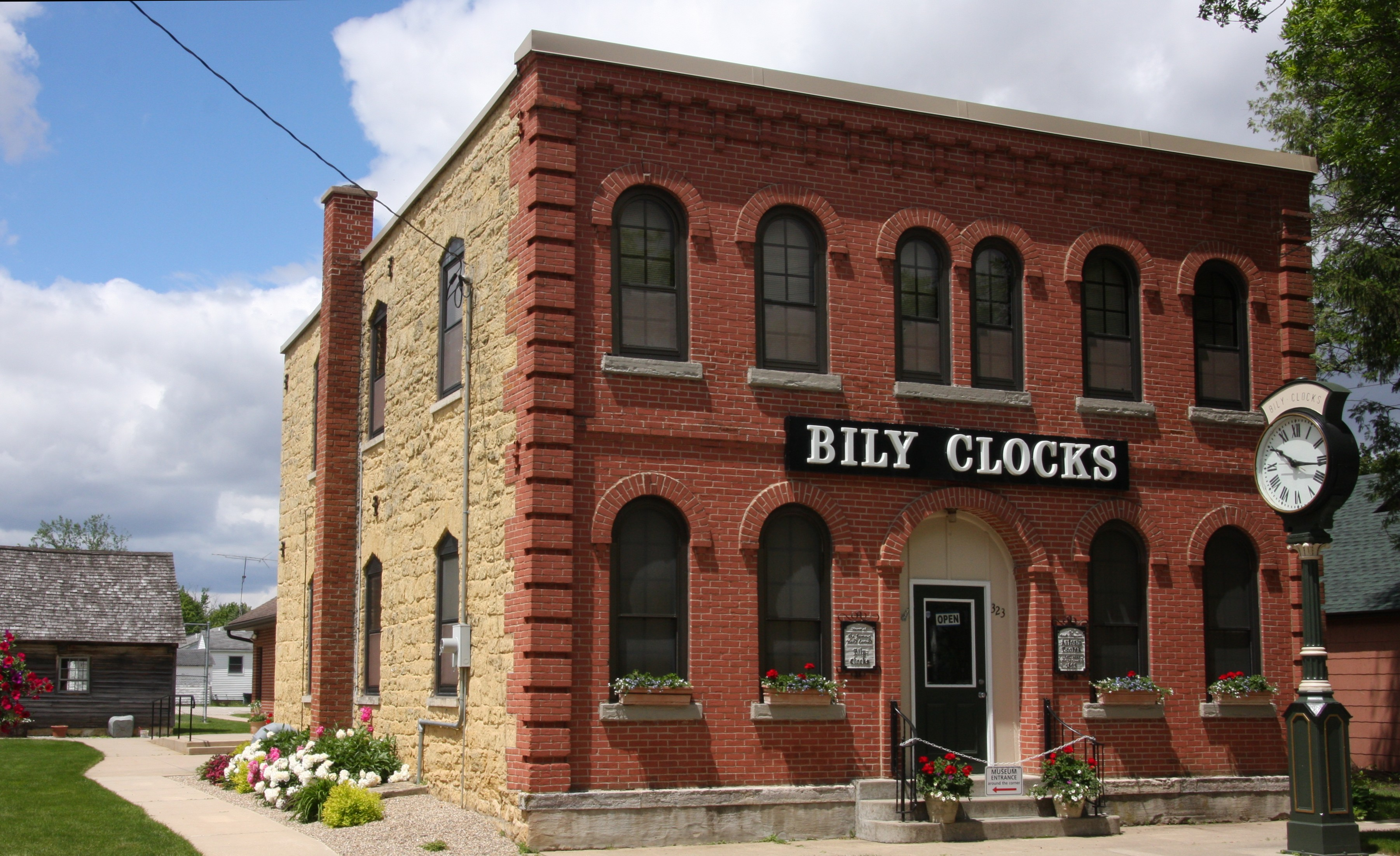
The museum in 2017

The Bily Clocks Museum is located in Spillville, Iowa, United States. The museum contains clocks that were made by hand from the years 1913 to 1958. The clocks were made by Frank and Joseph Bily, together known as the Bily brothers. The clocks include the American Pioneer Clock, a version of the World's Smallest Church, and the Apostles Parade Clock.

Frank and Joseph Bily were born in the late 19th century in Spillville, Iowa. They went on to become farmers as well as carpenters. They took up clockmaking as their hobby, carving and creating complex, finely detailed works of art out of wood.

The Bily brothers were originally going to burn their creations when they died, but they later donated their collection to the city of Spillville.

The Czech composer Antonín Dvořák spent the summer of 1893 in the building, which is where he completed his Symphony No. 9 in E minor, "From the New World".

== See also ==
- List of music museums
