= Eugene T. Meyer =

American politician and former law enforcement official

Eugene T. Meyer is an American politician and former law enforcement official from Iowa.

Meyer received a bachelor's degree in Criminal Justice from Parsons College in Fairfield, Iowa. He later earned a Master of Public Administration (MPA) degree from Drake University.

In 1969, he joined the Iowa Department of Public Safety as a communications specialist. In 1973, he was promoted to special agent with the Iowa Division of Criminal Investigation. He was later promoted to Assistant Director and, ultimately, to Director. Meyer retired as the Director of the Iowa Division of Criminal Investigation in 2006.

In 2007, Iowa Governor Chet Culver appointed Meyer as the Commissioner of Public Safety for the State of Iowa.

Meyer was elected to the position of Mayor of the City of West Des Moines, Iowa, serving from 1997 to 2006.
