= Sumner Township, Winneshiek County, Iowa =

Township in Winneshiek County, Iowa, U.S.

Coordinates: 43.212°N 92.022°W

Sumner Township is a township in Winneshiek County, Iowa, USA.

== History ==
Sumner Township was established in 1862.
