= Madison Township, Winneshiek County, Iowa =

Township in Winneshiek County, Iowa, U.S.

Coordinates: 43.299°N 91.903°W

Madison Township is a township in Winneshiek County, Iowa, USA.

== History ==
Madison Township was established in 1880.
