= Fremont Township, Winneshiek County, Iowa =

Township in Winneshiek County, Iowa, U.S.

Coordinates: 43.465°N 92.025°W

Fremont Township is a township in Winneshiek County, Iowa, United States.

== History ==
Fremont Township was established in 1856. It is named for John C. Frémont.
