= Northeast Iowa Community College =

Multi-campus public college in Iowa, US

Coordinates: 41.0159°N 92.4069°W

- Type: Public community college
- Established: 1966
- President: Dave Dahms, Interim President
- Students: 4,786
- Location: Calmar and Peosta, Iowa, United States
- Campus: Rural
- Mascot: Cougars
- Website: www.nicc.edu

Northeast Iowa Community College (NICC) is a public community college with two main campuses in Iowa, one in Calmar and one in Peosta. The college serves the Iowa counties of Allamakee, Chickasaw, Clayton, Fayette, Howard, Winneshiek, Dubuque, and Delaware counties. It also includes sections of Bremer, Buchanan, Jones, Jackson, and Mitchell counties. NICC also has a satellite campus in downtown Dubuque, Iowa.

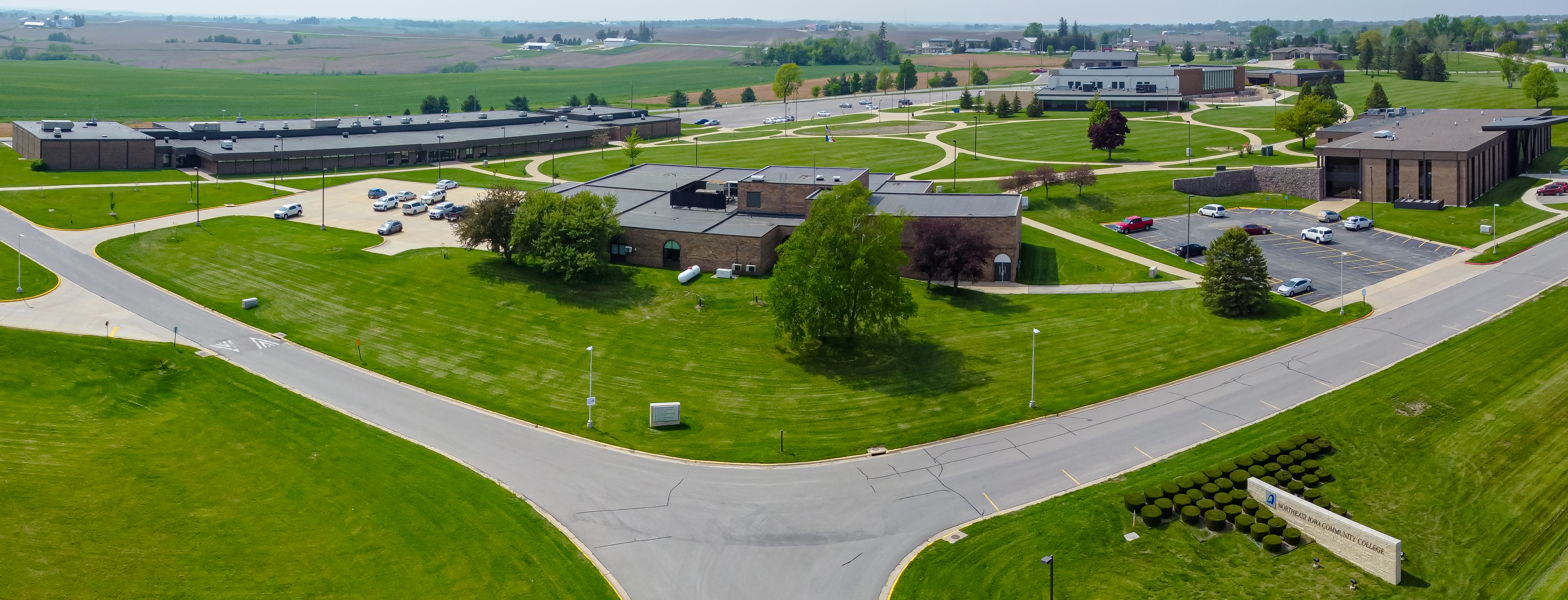
Northeast Iowa Community College

Originally, the school was known as Northeast Iowa Technical Institute (NITI). The school became a community college in 1988 and was renamed. The school is authorized by the Iowa Board of Education to award the Associate in Arts, Associate in Science, and Associate in Applied Science degrees as well as the GED. It offers programs in a number of vocational fields, as well as transfer programs for students wishing to continue their education at four-year institutions. The school had worked with the University of Dubuque to provide a transfer option for students looking to transfer to four-year programs. The Peosta Campus houses the National Education Center for Agricultural Safety (NECAS), a nationally accredited agricultural training center.

As part of a three-day Midwestern bus tour, President Barack Obama traveled to the college with members of his cabinet to host the White House Rural Economic Forum on August 16, 2011. The college also hosted President Donald Trump for an economic roundtable in July 2018.
