= Morgan, Iowa =

- Unincorporated community
- Location within the state of Iowa Morgan, Iowa (the United States)
- Coordinates: 43°23′33″N 92°02′58″W
- Country: United States
- State: Iowa
- County: Winneshiek
- Elevation: 1,168 ft (356 m)
- Time zone: UTC-6 (Central (CST))
  - Summer (DST): UTC-5 (CDT)
- GNIS feature ID: 467207

Morgan is an unincorporated community in northwestern Winneshiek County, Iowa, United States.

== History ==
A post office was established in February 1857, and remained in operation until being discontinued in December 1866.
