= Bluffton Township, Winneshiek County, Iowa =

Township in Winneshiek County, Iowa, U.S.

Coordinates: 43.3852°N 91.9090°W

Bluffton Township is a township in Winneshiek County, Iowa, United States.

== History ==
Bluffton Township was organized in 1856. It was named from its river bluffs.
