= South Winneshiek Community School District =

Public school district in Calmar, Iowa, United States

Coordinates: 43.180509°N 91.866956°W

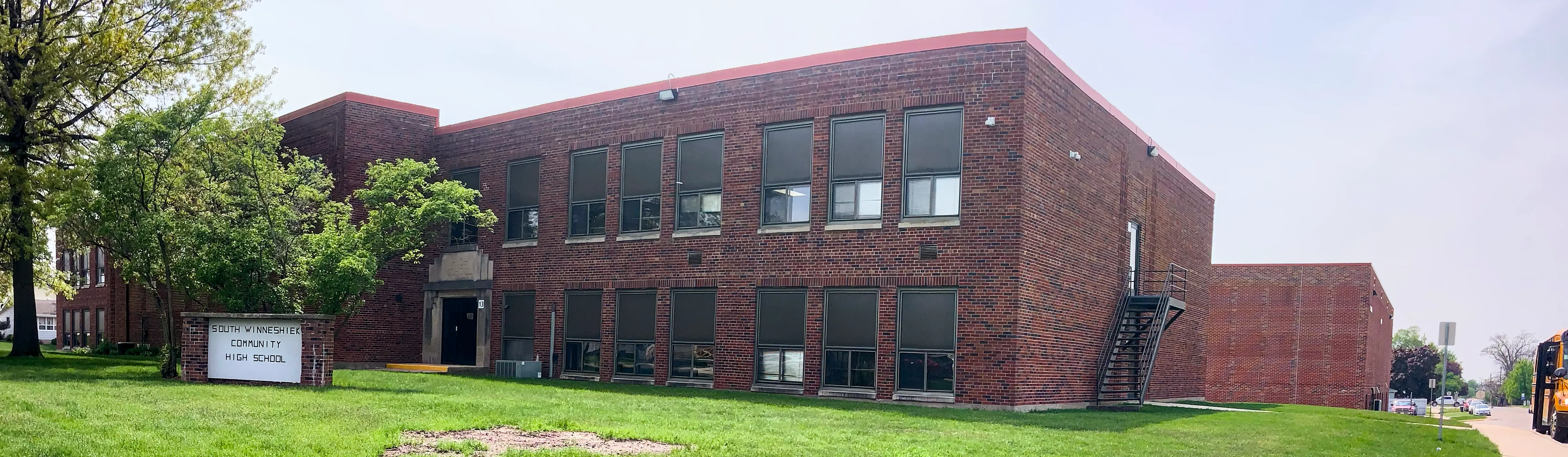

Location
- Calmar Winneshiek County United States
- Coordinates: 43.180509, -91.866956

District information
- Type: Public school district
- Grades: Pre-K to 12
- Established: 1958
- Superintendent: Kris Einck
- Schools: 2
- Budget: $9,289,000 (2020-21)
- NCES District ID: 1926790

Students and staff
- Students: 549 (2022-23)
- Teachers: 40.34 FTE
- Staff: 55.46 FTE
- Student–teacher ratio: 13.61
- Athletic conference: Upper Iowa Conference
- District mascot: Warriors
- Colors: Red and White

Other information
- Website: Official website

The South Winneshiek Community School District (SW) is a rural public school district headquartered in Calmar, Iowa. With campuses in Calmar and Ossian, it serves grades Pre-K through 12th.

The district is entirely in Winneshiek County, and includes the municipalities of Calmar, Ossian, Castalia, and Spillville. It also includes the unincorporated areas of Conover and Festina. It has about 180 square miles (470 km^{2}) of area.

The school mascot is the Warriors, and the colors are dark red and white.

== Schools ==
South Winneshiek High School serves grades 9–12. The school is located in Calmar.

South Winneshiek Elementary/Middle School serves grades PreK-8. The school is located in Ossian.

=== South Winneshiek High School ===
==== Athletics ====
The Warriors compete in the Upper Iowa Conference in the following sports:

- Cross Country
  - Boys 2-time State Champions
    - 2006 - Class 2A
    - 2008 - Class 1A
  - Girls 2-time State Champions (2021, 2025)
- Volleyball
- Football
- Basketball
- Wrestling
- Track and Field
  - Girls' 2-time State Champions (1997, 1999)
- Golf
  - Boys 1A State Runner Ups (2025)
- Baseball
- Softball

== See also ==
- List of school districts in Iowa
- List of high schools in Iowa
