= Canoe Township, Winneshiek County, Iowa =

Township in Winneshiek County, Iowa, U.S.

Coordinates: 43.3853°N 91.7898°W

Canoe Township
- Township
- Interactive map of Canoe Township
- Country: United States
- State: Iowa
- County: Winneshiek

Area
  - Total: 35.48 sq mi (91.9 km^{2})
  - Land: 35.48 sq mi (91.9 km^{2})
  - Water: 0.00 sq mi (0 km^{2})

Population (2020)
  - Total: 509
  - Density: 14.3/sq mi (5.54/km^{2})
- Time zone: UTC−6 (Central (CST))
  - Summer (DST): UTC−5 (CDT)
- GNIS ID: 467527

Canoe Township is a township in Winneshiek County, Iowa, United States.

== History ==
Canoe Township takes its name from the Canoe Creek.
