= E.A. "Penny" Westfall =

American attorney and former law enforcement official.

E.A. "Penny" Westfall is an American attorney and former law enforcement official. She received a Bachelor of Science in Business Administration from the University of Nebraska Omaha in 1975 and an MBA from the University of Nebraska Omaha in 1985. She also earned a J.D. from Creighton University School of Law.

From 1978 to 1985, she served as an Assistant County Attorney in Pottawattamie County, Iowa. From 1987 to 1985, she served as the elected County Attorney for Pottawattamie County. After 1991, she served as an Iowa Assistant Attorney General for the Office of the Iowa Attorney General.

In 1994, she became the Chief deputy for the Story County Sheriff . In January of 1999, she was appointed Commissioner of the Iowa Department of Public Safety by Iowa Governor Tom Vilsack. She was the first female to serve as Public Safety Commissioner. She subsequently became the director of the Iowa Law Enforcement Academy.
