= Castalia, Iowa =

- City
- Location of Castalia, Iowa
- Coordinates: 43°06′45″N 91°40′37″W
- Country: United States
- State: Iowa
- County: Winneshiek

Area
  - Total: 0.58 sq mi (1.50 km^{2})
  - Land: 0.58 sq mi (1.50 km^{2})
  - Water: 0 sq mi (0.00 km^{2})
- Elevation: 1,250 ft (380 m)

Population (2020)
  - Total: 145
  - Density: 251/sq mi (96.9/km^{2})
- Time zone: UTC-6 (Central (CST))
  - Summer (DST): UTC-5 (CDT)
- ZIP code: 52133
- Area code: 563
- FIPS code: 19-11485
- GNIS feature ID: 2393770

Castalia is a city in Winneshiek County, Iowa, United States. The population was 145 at the 2020 census.

== History ==
The railroad was built through Castalia in 1864. Castalia was incorporated in 1902.

== Geography ==
According to the United States Census Bureau, the city has a total area of 0.58 square miles (1.50 km^{2}), all land.

== Demographics ==
Historical populations
| Year | Pop. | ±% |
|---|---|---|
| 1880 | 108 | — |
| 1910 | 230 | +113.0% |
| 1920 | 272 | +18.3% |
| 1930 | 200 | −26.5% |
| 1940 | 239 | +19.5% |
| 1950 | 221 | −7.5% |
| 1960 | 216 | −2.3% |
| 1970 | 210 | −2.8% |
| 1980 | 188 | −10.5% |
| 1990 | 177 | −5.9% |
| 2000 | 175 | −1.1% |
| 2010 | 173 | −1.1% |
| 2020 | 145 | −16.2% |
Source:"U.S. Census website". United States Census Bureau. and Iowa Data Center; Source: U.S. Decennial Census

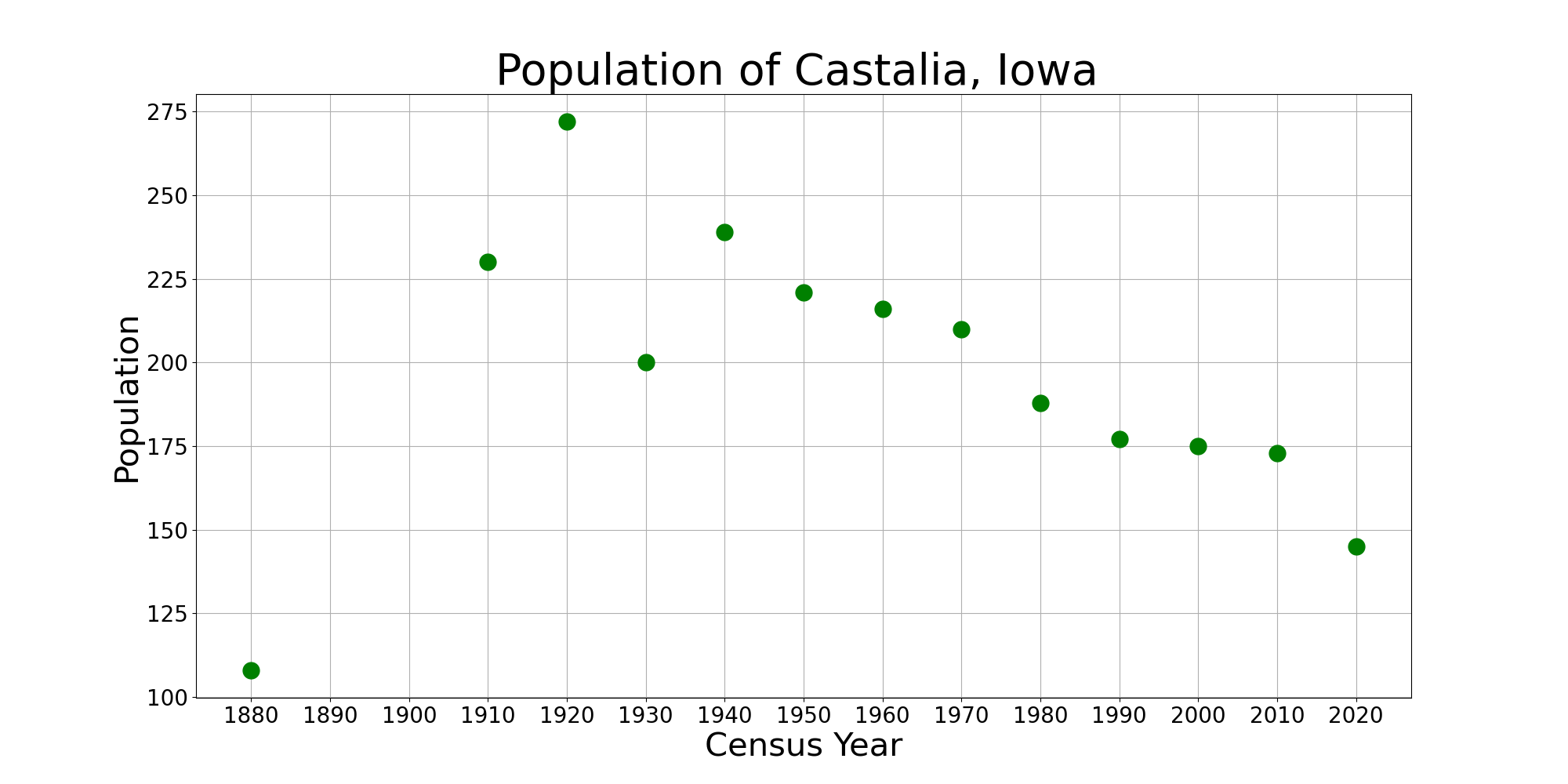
The population of Castalia, Iowa from US census data

=== 2020 census ===
As of the census of 2020, there were 145 people, 78 households, and 49 families residing in the city. The population density was 251.0 inhabitants per square mile (96.9/km^{2}). There were 78 housing units at an average density of 135.0 per square mile (52.1/km^{2}). The racial makeup of the city was 85.5% White, 0.0% Black or African American, 0.0% Native American, 0.0% Asian, 0.0% Pacific Islander, 10.3% from other races and 4.1% from two or more races. Hispanic or Latino persons of any race comprised 13.1% of the population.

Of the 78 households, 20.5% of which had children under the age of 18 living with them, 46.2% were married couples living together, 12.8% were cohabitating couples, 24.4% had a female householder with no spouse or partner present and 16.7% had a male householder with no spouse or partner present. 37.2% of all households were non-families. 30.8% of all households were made up of individuals, 15.4% had someone living alone who was 65 years old or older.

The median age in the city was 53.3 years. 14.5% of the residents were under the age of 20; 5.5% were between the ages of 20 and 24; 24.8% were from 25 and 44; 22.8% were from 45 and 64; and 32.4% were 65 years of age or older. The gender makeup of the city was 47.6% male and 52.4% female.

=== 2010 census ===
At the 2010 census there were 173 people in 82 households, including 49 families, in the city. The population density was 298.3 inhabitants per square mile (115.2/km^{2}). There were 84 housing units at an average density of 144.8 per square mile (55.9/km^{2}). The racial makup of the city was 100.0% White. Hispanic or Latino of any race were 1.2%.

Of the 82 households 22.0% had children under the age of 18 living with them, 47.6% were married couples living together, 8.5% had a female householder with no husband present, 3.7% had a male householder with no wife present, and 40.2% were non-families. 35.4% of households were one person and 18.3% were one person aged 65 or older. The average household size was 2.11 and the average family size was 2.71.

The median age was 48.6 years. 20.8% of residents were under the age of 18; 4.6% were between the ages of 18 and 24; 19% were from 25 to 44; 35.2% were from 45 to 64; and 20.2% were 65 or older. The gender makeup of the city was 49.1% male and 50.9% female.

=== 2000 census ===
At the 2000 census there were 175 people in 79 households, including 48 families, in the city. The population density was 243.0 inhabitants per square mile (93.8/km^{2}). There were 81 housing units at an average density of 112.5 per square mile (43.4/km^{2}). The racial makup of the city was 95.43% White, 2.29% from other races, and 2.29% from two or more races. Hispanic or Latino of any race were 4.00%.

Of the 79 households 24.1% had children under the age of 18 living with them, 49.4% were married couples living together, 7.6% had a female householder with no husband present, and 39.2% were non-families. 30.4% of households were one person and 11.4% were one person aged 65 or older. The average household size was 2.22 and the average family size was 2.69.

The age distribution was 19.4% under the age of 18, 9.1% from 18 to 24, 25.7% from 25 to 44, 31.4% from 45 to 64, and 14.3% 65 or older. The median age was 40 years. For every 100 females, there were 108.3 males. For every 100 females age 18 and over, there were 113.6 males.

The median household income was $30,417 and the median family income was $25,833. Males had a median income of $28,750 versus $18,750 for females. The per capita income for the city was $17,228. About 21.7% of families and 15.4% of the population were below the poverty line, including 22.2% of those under the age of eighteen and none of those sixty five or over.

== Education ==
The community is within the South Winneshiek Community School District.
