= Spillville, Iowa =

- City
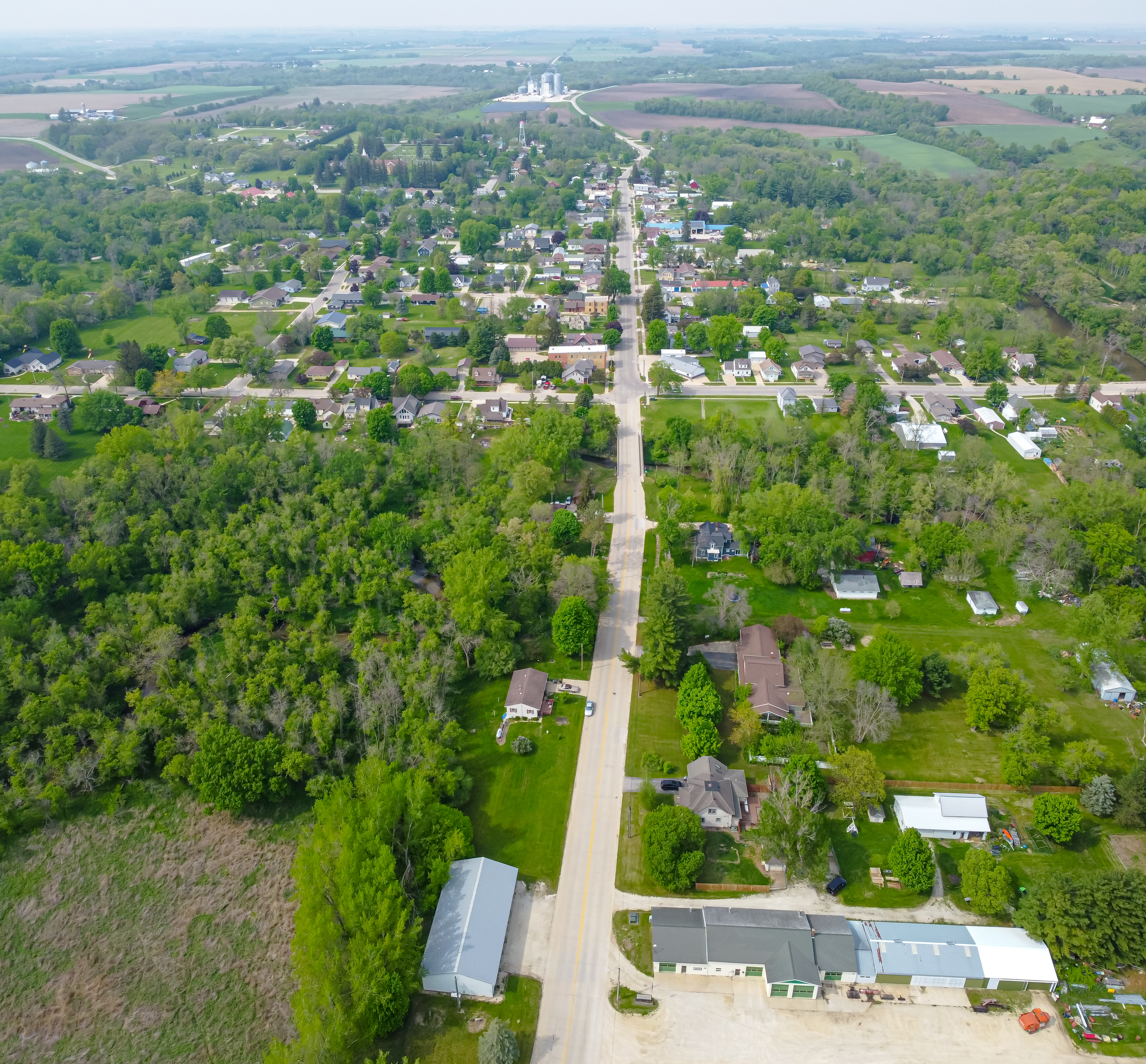
- The Turkey River runs through town
- Nickname: Spillville Fireworks
- Location of Spillville, Iowa
- Coordinates: 43°12′N 91°57′W
- Country: United States
- State: Iowa
- County: Winneshiek

Area
  - Total: 0.45 sq mi (1.16 km^{2})
  - Land: 0.44 sq mi (1.14 km^{2})
  - Water: 0.0077 sq mi (0.02 km^{2})
- Elevation: 1,070 ft (326 m)

Population (2020)
  - Total: 385
  - Density: 876.5/sq mi (338.41/km^{2})
- Time zone: UTC-6 (Central (CST))
  - Summer (DST): UTC-5 (CDT)
- ZIP code: 52168
- Area code: 563
- FIPS code: 19-74370
- GNIS feature ID: 0461848
- Website: www.spillville.org

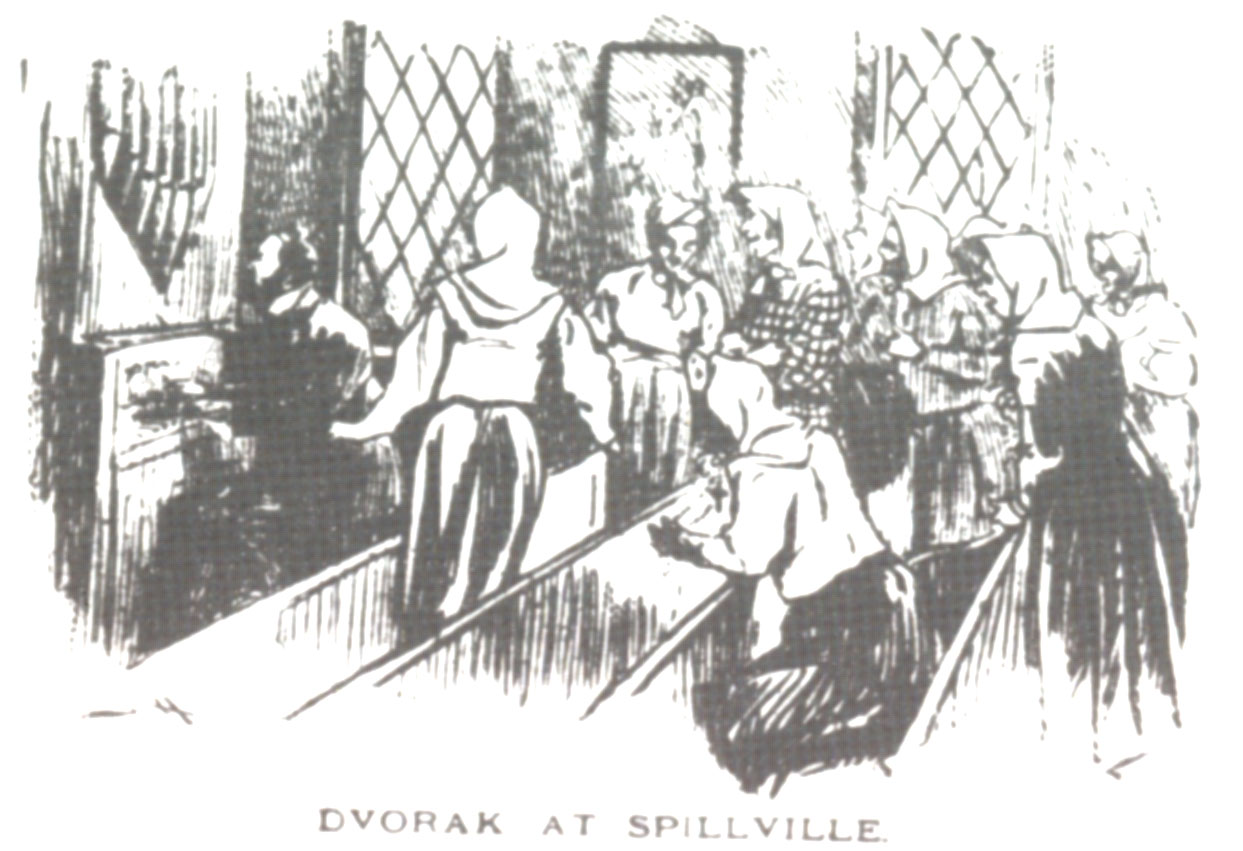
Antonín Dvořák in Spillville

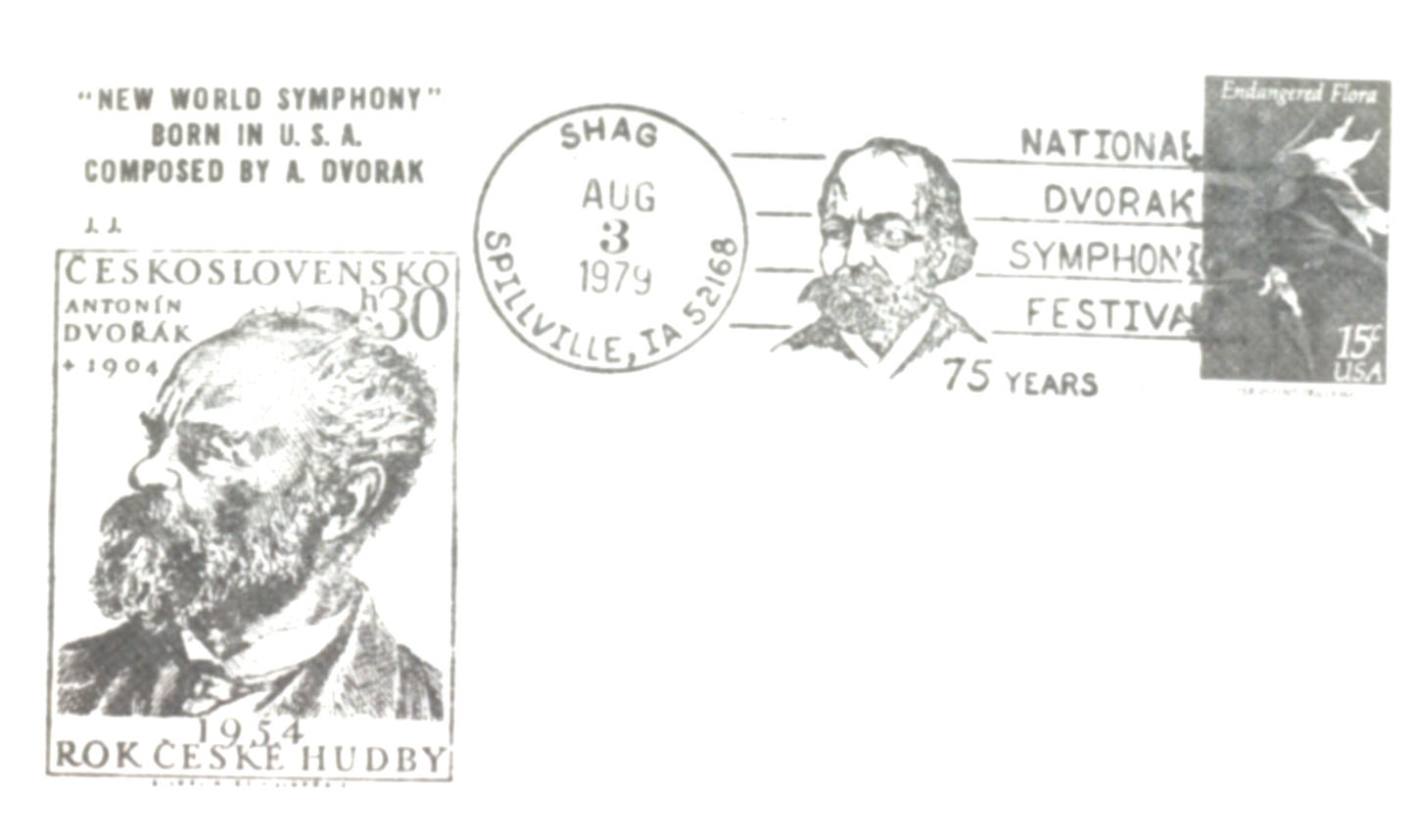
the stamp from Spillville's festival

Spillville is a city in Winneshiek County, Iowa, United States. The population was 385 at the time of the 2020 census. It is located in Calmar Township, approximately 4 mi (6.4 km) west of Calmar and about 12 miles (19 km) southwest of Decorah, the county seat. Spillville is known for its Independence Day fireworks display, held the first Saturday in July.

== History ==
Spillville was platted by German Joseph Spielmann in 1860. Originally named Spielville after the founder, Joseph Spielman, the community's name was misread and became Spillville.

It was largely settled by Bohemian, German and Swiss immigrants.

Spillville boasts a strong cultural and musical history. The Czech composer Antonín Dvořák spent most of 1893 in Spillville, where his friend Josef Jan Kovařík had relatives. There he composed the monumental Symphony No. 9 in E minor, "From the New World", as well as two of his most famous chamber works, the String Quartet in F ("The American") and the String Quintet in E-flat. Spillville is also the site of the Inwood Ballroom, established in 1920 and the destination of several popular 20th-century musicians such as Louis Armstrong, Glenn Miller, Guy Lombardo, and The Byrds. Many tourists to Spillville have also visited the Bily Clocks Museum (see link below), a collection of intricately designed clocks created by two brothers in Spillville housed in the building where Dvořák lived during his stay.

The Roman Catholic parish in Spillville, St. Wenceslaus Church, was built in 1860 and is the oldest Czech Catholic church in the United States.

== Geography ==
Spillville is located at 43°12′N 91°57′W (43.202, -91.952).

According to the United States Census Bureau, the city has a total area of 0.43 square miles (1.11 km^{2}), of which 0.42 square miles (1.09 km^{2}) is land and 0.01 square miles (0.03 km^{2}) is water.

== Demographics ==
Historical populations
Year	Pop.	±%
1880	340	—
1900	356	+4.7%
1910	320	−10.1%
1920	315	−1.6%
1930	304	−3.5%
1940	329	+8.2%
1950	363	+10.3%
1960	389	+7.2%
1970	361	−7.2%
1980	415	+15.0%
1990	387	−6.7%
2000	386	−0.3%
2010	367	−4.9%
2020	385	+4.9%
Source:"U.S. Census website". United States Census Bureau. and Iowa Data Center; Source: U.S. Decennial Census

=== 2020 census ===
As of the census of 2020, there were 385 people, 173 households, and 103 families residing in the city. The population density was 876.5 inhabitants per square mile (338.4/km^{2}). There were 193 housing units at an average density of 439.4 per square mile (169.6/km^{2}). The racial makeup of the city was 97.4% White, 0.3% Black or African American, 0.0% Native American, 0.3% Asian, 0.0% Pacific Islander, 0.0% from other races and 2.1% from two or more races. Hispanic or Latino persons of any race comprised 0.3% of the population.

Of the 173 households, 27.7% of which had children under the age of 18 living with them, 46.8% were married couples living together, 9.8% were cohabitating couples, 24.9% had a female householder with no spouse or partner present and 18.5% had a male householder with no spouse or partner present. 40.5% of all households were non-families. 34.7% of all households were made up of individuals, 18.5% had someone living alone who was 65 years old or older.

The median age in the city was 40.1 years. 26.8% of the residents were under the age of 20; 4.4% were between the ages of 20 and 24; 25.2% were from 25 and 44; 23.6% were from 45 and 64; and 20.0% were 65 years of age or older. The gender makeup of the city was 46.5% male and 53.5% female.

=== 2010 census ===
As of the census of 2010, there were 367 people, 168 households, and 96 families living in the city. The population density was 873.8 inhabitants per square mile (337.4/km^{2}). There were 182 housing units at an average density of 433.3 per square mile (167.3/km^{2}). The racial makeup of the city was 96.5% White, 0.3% African American, 0.3% Native American, and 3.0% from other races. Hispanic or Latino of any race were 3.3% of the population.

There were 168 households, of which 26.8% had children under the age of 18 living with them, 50.6% were married couples living together, 4.2% had a female householder with no husband present, 2.4% had a male householder with no wife present, and 42.9% were non-families. 35.7% of all households were made up of individuals, and 21.4% had someone living alone who was 65 years of age or older. The average household size was 2.18 and the average family size was 2.90.

The median age in the city was 42.8 years. 22.3% of residents were under the age of 18; 5.9% were between the ages of 18 and 24; 23.2% were from 25 to 44; 23.3% were from 45 to 64; and 25.1% were 65 years of age or older. The gender makeup of the city was 50.7% male and 49.3% female.

=== 2000 census ===
As of the census of 2000, there were 386 people, 172 households, and 110 families living in the city. The population density was 920.8 inhabitants per square mile (355.5/km^{2}). There were 184 housing units at an average density of 438.9 per square mile (169.5/km^{2}). The racial makeup of the city was 98.70% White, 0.78% Native American, 0.26% Asian, 0.26% from other races. Hispanic or Latino of any race were 1.55% of the population.

There were 172 households, out of which 29.7% had children under the age of 18 living with them, 55.2% were married couples living together, 7.6% had a female householder with no husband present, and 35.5% were non-families. 32.0% of all households were made up of individuals, and 20.3% had someone living alone who was 65 years of age or older. The average household size was 2.24 and the average family size was 2.85.

24.6% are under the age of 18, 5.7% from 18 to 24, 28.5% from 25 to 44, 18.4% from 45 to 64, and 22.8% who were 65 years of age or older. The median age was 38 years. For every 100 females, there were 96.9 males. For every 100 females age 18 and over, there were 94.0 males.

The median income for a household in the city was $32,500, and the median income for a family was $41,563. Males had a median income of $30,909 versus $20,938 for females. The per capita income for the city was $15,674. About 5.0% of families and 6.9% of the population were below the poverty line, including 4.3% of those under age 18 and 20.5% of those age 65 or over.

== Parks ==
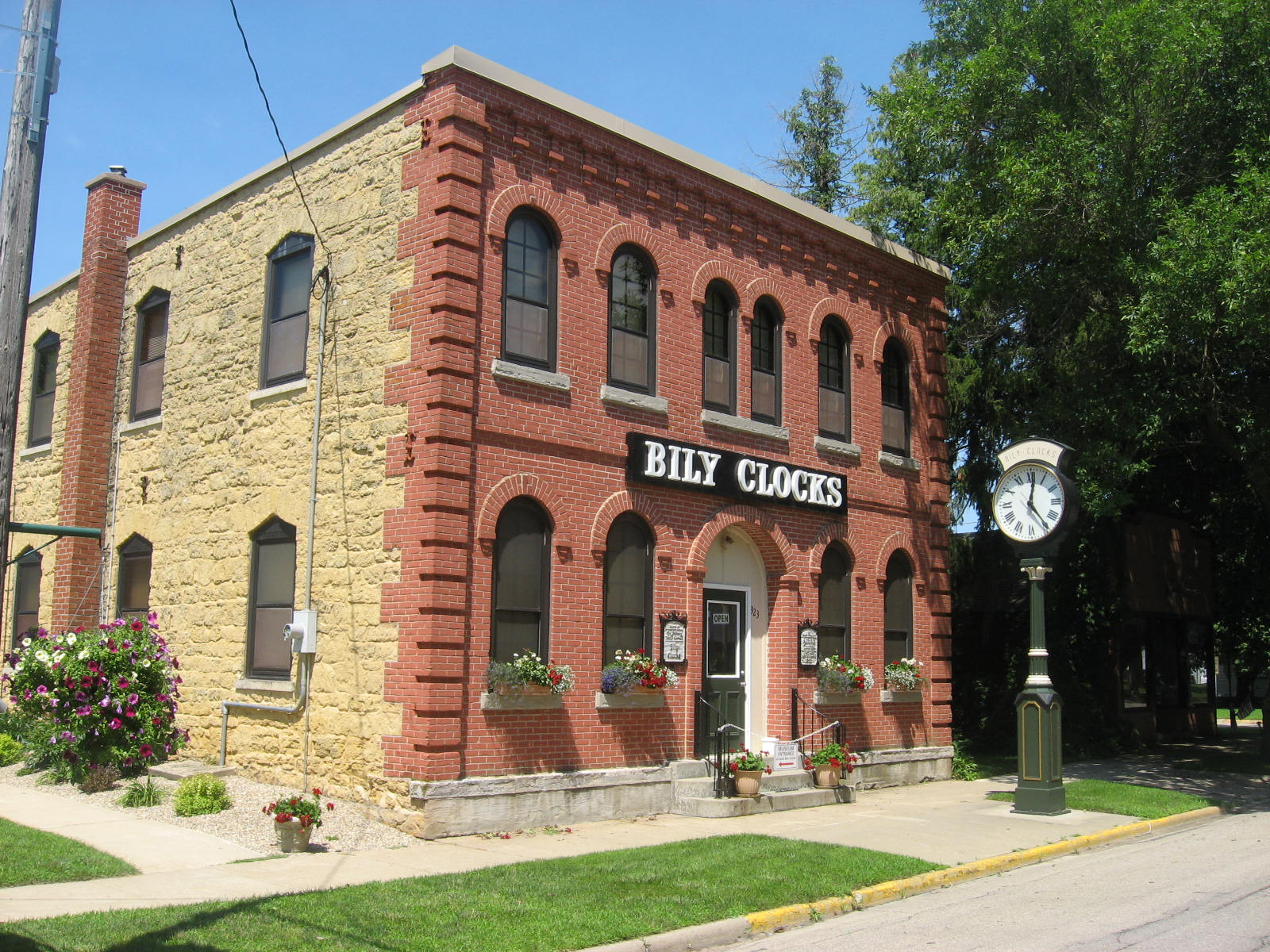
The Bily Clocks Museum is located in Spillville. The museum contains clocks that were made by hand from the years 1913 to 1958. The clocks were made by Frank and Joseph Bily, together known as the Bily brothers. The same house contains the room where Antonín Dvořák lived in 1893 and where he composed his famous Symphony No. 9 "From the New World"

- Riverside Park & the Inwood Pavilion

== Education ==
The community is within the South Winneshiek Community School District.

CFS Catholic School formed as a consolidation of Catholic schools in Calmar, Festina, and Spillville. Prior to fall 2020 its campuses are St. Aloysius Center in Calmar and St. Wenceslaus Center in Spillville. In 2019 CFS and St. Theresa of Calcutta in Ossian announced plans to consolidate into a single school, with the Calmar campus closing. Beginning fall 2020 the Ossian campus will house grades K-2 and middle school while the Spillville campus will house grades 3–4.
