= Larry Noble (politician) =

American politician

Larry L. Noble
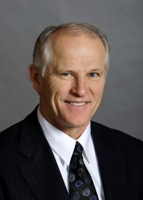

Member of the Iowa Senate from the 35th district
- In office January 8, 2007 – December 17, 2010
- Preceded by: Jeff Lamberti
- Succeeded by: Jack Whitver

Commissioner of the Iowa Department of Public Safety
- In office January 14, 2011 – July 5, 2012
- Appointed by: Terry Branstad
- Preceded by: Eugene Meyer
- Succeeded by: K. Brian London
- In office September 2013 – January 9, 2015
- Appointed by: Terry Branstad
- Preceded by: K. Brian London
- Succeeded by: Roxann Ryan

Personal details
- Born: Grandview, Missouri, U.S.
- Party: Republican
- Children: Brett and Shelby
- Education: Central Missouri State University
- Website: Noble's website

Larry L. Noble was an Iowa State Senator from the 35th District. He served in the Iowa Senate from 2007 until his resignation on December 17, 2010.

He earned his BA in Criminal Justice Administration from Central Missouri State University (now the University of Central Missouri) in 1973.

Noble was elected in 2006 with 16,694 votes (52%), defeating Democratic opponent Merle O. Johnson. He was re-elected in 2010 with 27,563 votes, running unopposed.

== Commissioner of Public Safety ==
He was appointed to become Commissioner of the Iowa Department of Public Safety (DPS) in December 2010 by Governor Terry Branstad. He assumed office on January 14, 2011. He resigned on July 5, 2012, stating he wanted to spend more time with family. He was initially succeeded by Steve Ponsetto, who was the Executive Officer of DPS. On September 11, 2012, Governor Branstad appointed K. Brian London to be the new Commissioner.

He was re-appointed as Commissioner of the Iowa Department of Public Safety in September 2013 by Governor Terry Branstad, following turmoil with his successor K. Brian London. He retired on January 9, 2015.

Iowa Senate
Preceded by Jeff Lamberti	35th District; 2007 – 2010	Succeeded by Jack Whitver
