= Charles W. Larson Sr. =

American attorney and government official

Charles ("Chuck") W. Lawson Sr. (May 30, 1935 to November 3, 2022) was an American attorney and government official. He received a B.S. degree from Kansas State University and a Juris Doctor degree from the University of Iowa College of Law.

== Career ==
He held a number of governmental positions at the state and federal level. From 1974 to 1980, he served as the Commissioner for the Iowa Department of Public Safety. In 1982, Iowa Governor Terry Branstad appointed Lawson as a member of the State of Iowa's Board of Parole. Lawson served as the chairman of this board from 1995 to 2001. In 2001, Iowa Governor Tom Vilsack reappointed Lawson as a full-time member of the Parole Board.

He served as the United States Attorney for the United States District Court for the Northern District of Iowa from 1986 to 1993. In 2001, President George W. Bush reappoined Lawson as U.S. Attorney for the Northern District of Iowa. He held this position until his retirement in 2006, though he took a leave of absence in 2004 to serve as a Senior Justice Advisor to the US Ambassador to Iraq, at the Embassy of the United States, Baghdad.

Lawson served in the United States Army Reserve for 33 years, retiring as a Colonel. He was a graduate of the United States Army Command and General Staff College and the United States Army War College. He was a recipient of the Legion of Merit.

== Personal life ==
Lawson was married to Ellen Larson, and the couple had two children, politician Chuck Larson and Carrie Larson Graham. He died on Thursday 3 November 2022 at the age 87.
