= Jack M Fulton =

American attorney and law enforcement official

Jack Merrick Fulton (1932–2013) was an American attorney and law enforcement official.

Fulton was born in Cedar Rapids, Iowa, and earned a B.A. from Coe College, where he was inducted into the Sports Hall of Fame for baseball and basketball.

He subsequently received a Juris Doctor degree from the University of Iowa College of Law.

Fulton served three terms as the County Attorney for Linn County, Iowa. He was appointed the Commissioner of the Iowa Department of Public Safety.

Fulton later moved to the State of Virginia and served as the Director of Public Safety for the City of Richmond, Virginia.
