= Iowa Division of Criminal Investigation =

State bureau of investigation

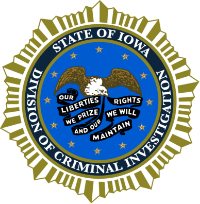
- DCI Seal

Agency overview
- Formed: 9 April 1921; 105 years ago
- Preceding agency: Bureau of Criminal Investigation

Jurisdictional structure
- Operations jurisdiction: Iowa, U.S.

Operational structure
- Headquarters: Des Moines, Iowa
- Special Agents: 114 (2020)
- Civilians: 102 (2020)
- Parent agency: Iowa Department of Public Safety

Website
- dps.iowa.gov/divisions/criminal-investigation

The Iowa Division of Criminal Investigation (colloquially known as DCI) is the state bureau of investigation for the U.S. state of Iowa. DCI provides investigative support and expertise to law enforcement and public safety agencies operating within Iowa and collaborates with local, state, and federal authorities in the investigation of a variety of criminal activities.

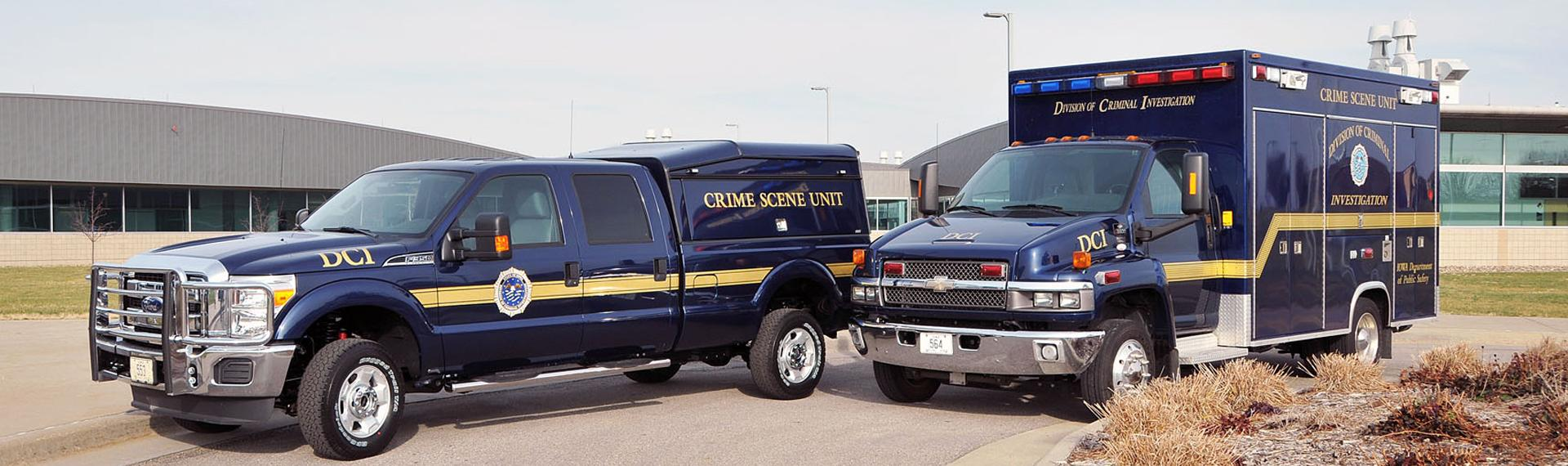
Two vehicles belonging to the DCI Crime Scene Unit staged outside of DCI headquarters.

== History ==
The DCI was originally founded as the Bureau of Criminal Investigation (BCI) in 1921 under the direction of state attorney general Ben Gibson. The BCI consolidated all state law enforcement officers who were appointed by the Governor and the Attorney General into one centralized agency.

== Organization ==
The DCI is a component of the Iowa Department of Public Safety.

=== Bureaus ===
The main components and associated sub-components of the Division are:

- Field Operations Bureau
  - Internet Crimes Against Children / Cyber Crime Unit
  - Major Crimes Unit
  - Sex offender registry Unit
- Support Operations Bureau
  - Automated Biometric Identification System (Fingerprint Identification) Unit
  - Administrative Support and Transcription Unit
  - Records and Identification Unit
  - Dissemination (Criminal history repository) Unit
  - Missing Persons and Unidentified Bodies Unit
- Special Enforcement Operations Bureau
- Criminalistics Laboratory
  - Arson Section
  - Breath Alcohol Section
  - Crime Scene Unit
  - DNA Casework Unit
  - DNA Profiling Convicted Offender Unit
  - Drug Identification Unit
  - Evidence Storage Unit
  - Firearms and Toolmarks Unit
  - Latent Print and Impression Evidence Unit
  - Photography Unit
  - Quality Assurance and Accreditation Unit
  - Questioned Documents Unit
  - Toxicology Unit
  - Trace Evidence Unit

=== Offices ===
For purposes of field operations, DCI separates the state into four geographic zones, each of which has a staff of special agents and professional support personnel led by a special agent-in-charge. These offices are often co-located with local offices of the Iowa State Patrol.

The Special Enforcement Operations Bureau has special agent offices within each of the registered and licensed casinos in the state.

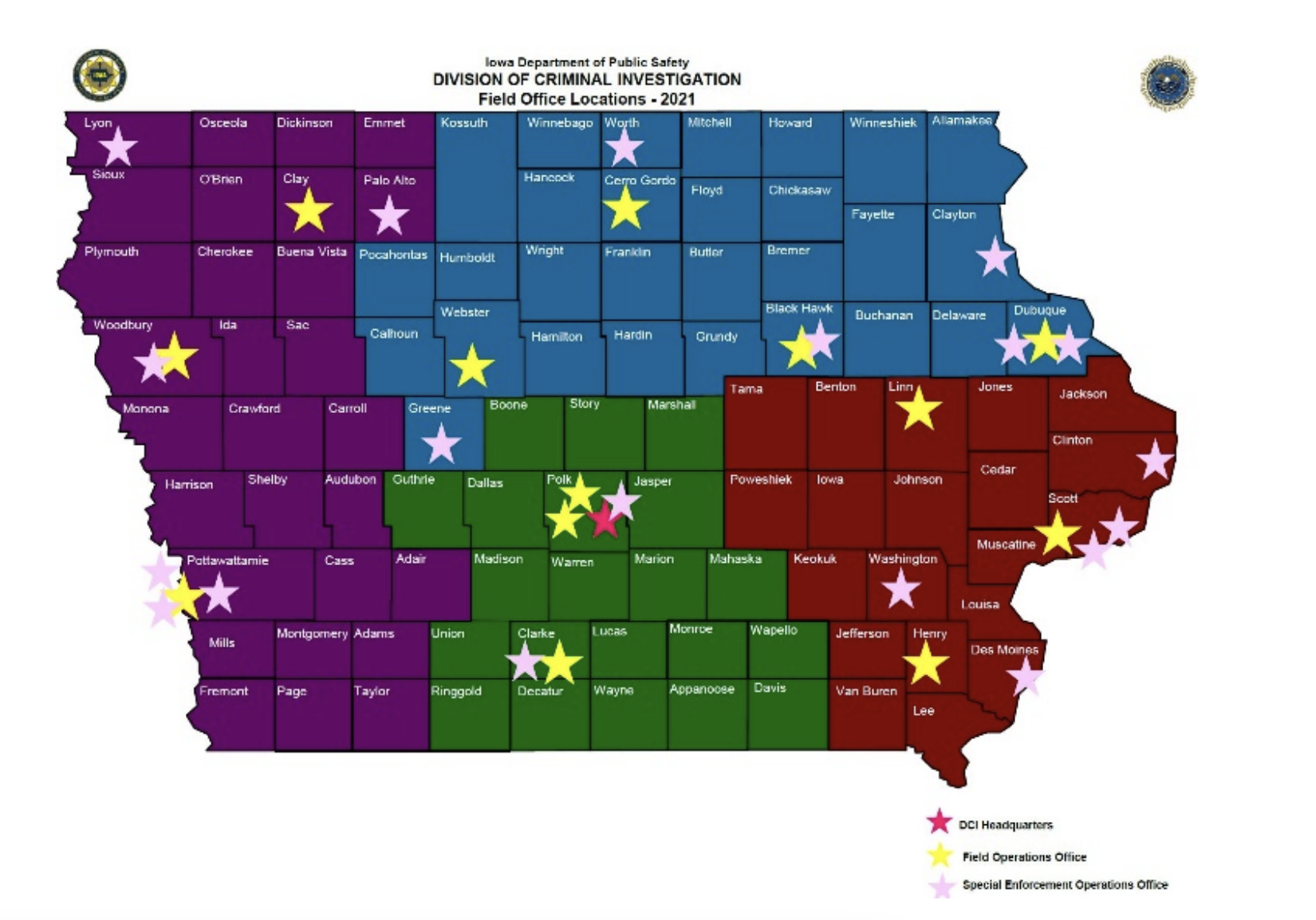
A map displaying the location of all DCI offices in the state of Iowa.

== Notable Cases ==
The DCI has been involved in a number of historically notable investigations, including the following:

- Investigation of the Hot Lotto fraud scandal
- Cadaver identification after the crash of United Airlines Flight 232
- Apprehension of members of the Barrow gang

== See also ==
- Iowa State Patrol
