= Calmar, Iowa =

- City
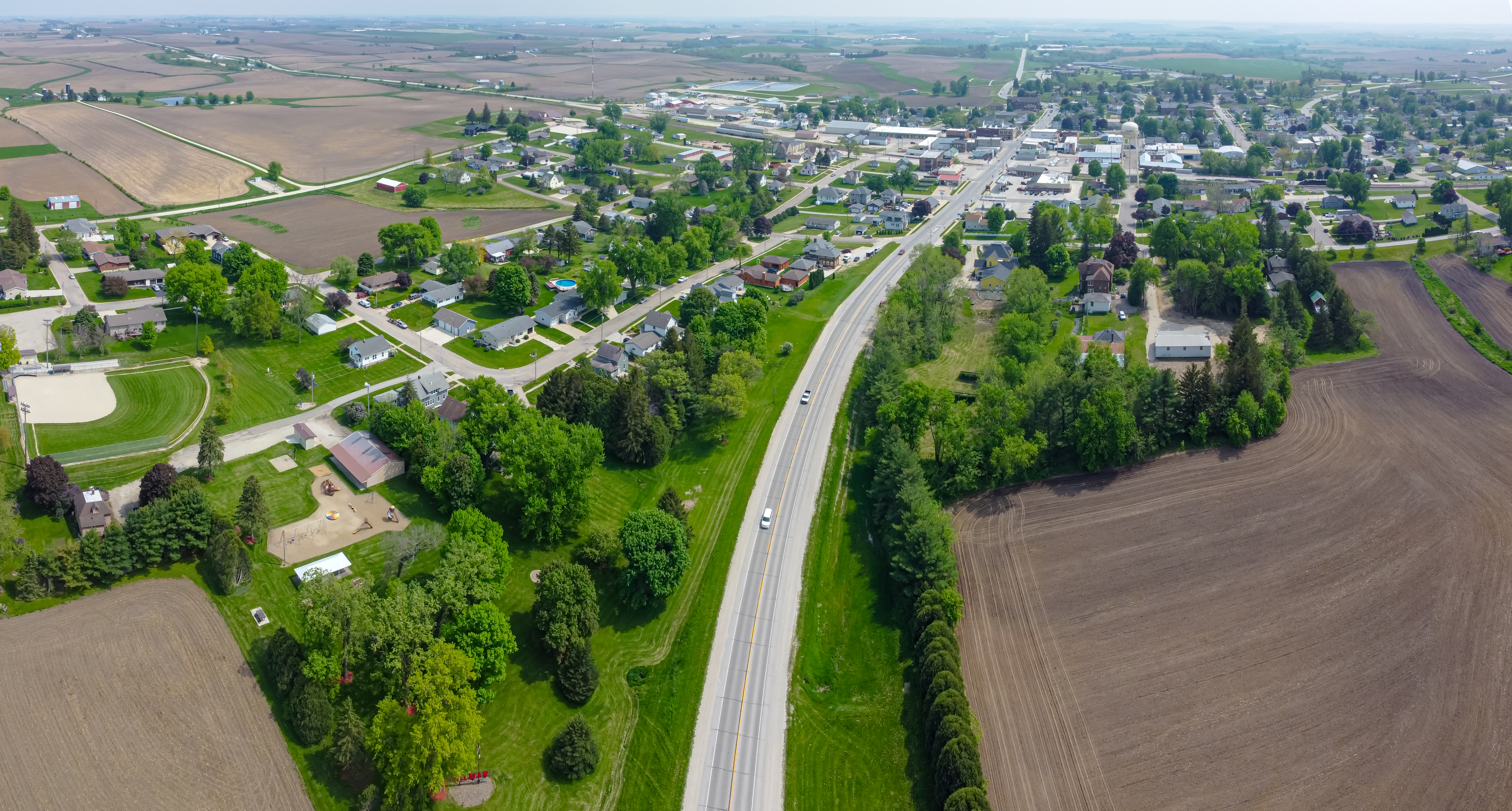
- US-52, IA-24, and IA-150 junction in town
- Motto: "If you lived in Calmar, you'd be home now!"
- Location of Calmar, Iowa
- Coordinates: 43°11′12″N 91°52′20″W
- Country: United States
- State: Iowa
- County: Winneshiek
- Named for: Kalmar, Sweden

Area
  - Total: 1.10 sq mi (2.86 km^{2})
  - Land: 1.10 sq mi (2.86 km^{2})
  - Water: 0 sq mi (0.00 km^{2})
- Elevation: 1,247 ft (380 m)

Population (2020)
  - Total: 1,125
  - Density: 1,017.7/sq mi (392.93/km^{2})
- Time zone: UTC-6 (Central (CST))
  - Summer (DST): UTC-5 (CDT)
- ZIP code: 52132
- Area code: 563
- FIPS code: 19-10045
- GNIS feature ID: 2393499
- Website: City of Calmar, Iowa Website

Calmar (Note: /ˈkælmər/) is a city in Winneshiek County, Iowa, United States. The population was 1,125 at the 2020 census. It is at the junction of U.S. Route 52 and State highways 150 and 24, with both state routes terminating in Calmar.

== History ==
Calmar was platted in 1854. It was named after Calmar, today spelled Kalmar, a city in Sweden.

The settlement experienced growth in 1868 when the railroad was built through it. Calmar was incorporated on July 14, 1869.

== Geography ==
According to the United States Census Bureau, the city has a total area of 1.07 square miles (2.77 km^{2}), all land.

== Demographics ==
Historical populations
Year	Pop.	±%
1880	617	—
1890	813	+31.8%
1900	1,003	+23.4%
1910	849	−15.4%
1920	1,039	+22.4%
1930	915	−11.9%
1940	903	−1.3%
1950	937	+3.8%
1960	954	+1.8%
1970	1,008	+5.7%
1980	1,053	+4.5%
1990	1,026	−2.6%
2000	1,058	+3.1%
2010	978	−7.6%
2020	1,125	+15.0%
Source:"U.S. Census website". United States Census Bureau. and Iowa Data Center; Source: U.S. Decennial Census

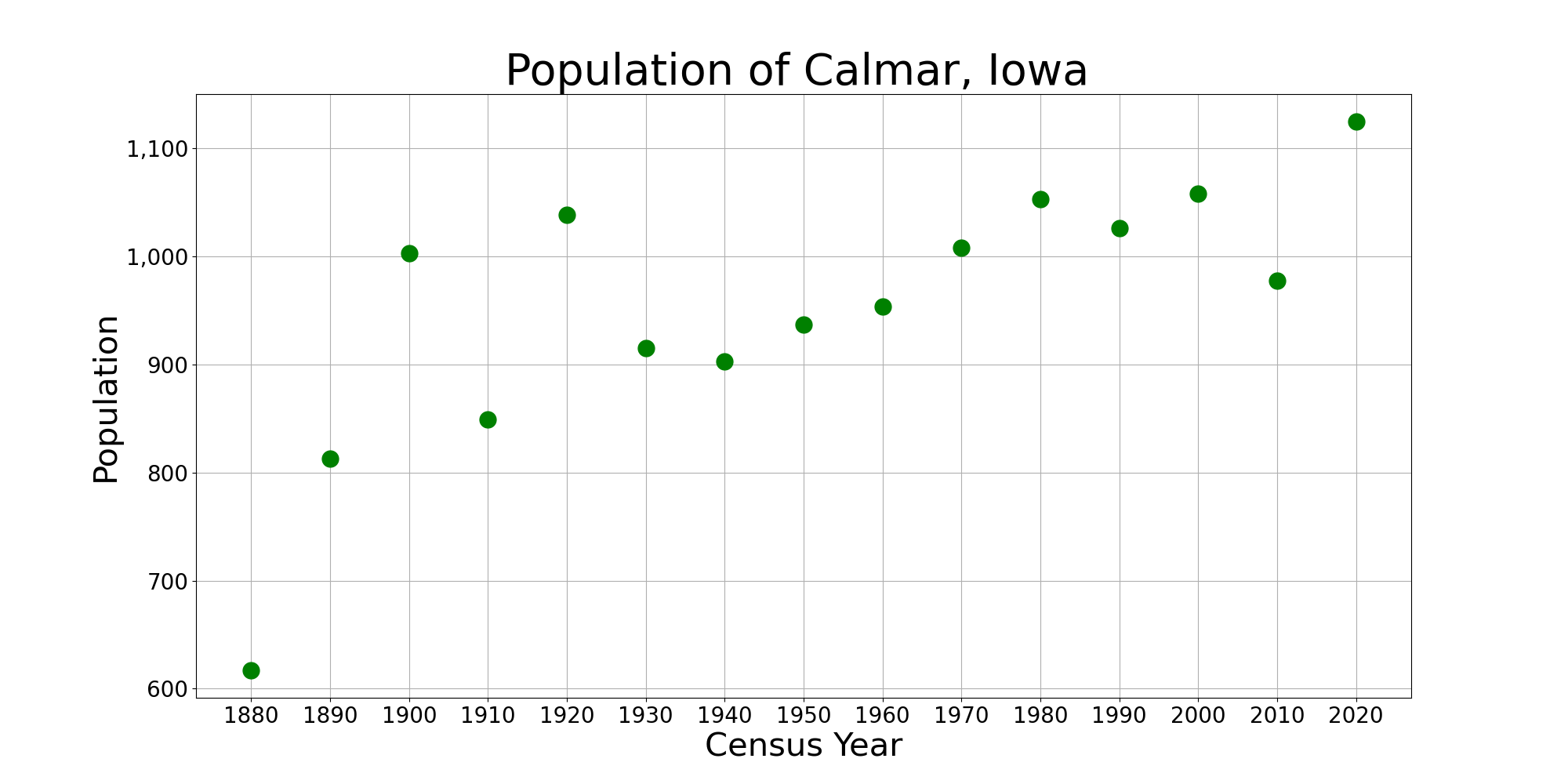
The population of Calmar, Iowa from US census data

=== 2020 census ===
As of the 2020 census, Calmar had a population of 1,125. The median age was 36.9 years. 22.9% of residents were under the age of 18. For every 100 females there were 102.3 males, and for every 100 females age 18 and over there were 99.3 males age 18 and over.

0.0% of residents lived in urban areas, while 100.0% lived in rural areas.

There were 479 households and 271 families in Calmar, of which 28.8% had children under the age of 18 living in them. Of all households, 41.5% were married-couple households, 6.3% were cohabiting-couple households, 23.8% were households with a male householder and no spouse or partner present, and 28.4% were households with a female householder and no spouse or partner present. 43.4% of households were non-families. About 30.6% of all households were made up of individuals and 9.9% had someone living alone who was 65 years of age or older.

The population density was 1,017.7 inhabitants per square mile (392.9/km^{2}). There were 524 housing units at an average density of 474.0 per square mile (183.0/km^{2}), of which 8.6% were vacant. The homeowner vacancy rate was 2.1% and the rental vacancy rate was 7.7%.

The age distribution was 27.7% under the age of 20, 7.4% from 20 to 24, 26.0% from 25 to 44, 24.3% from 45 to 64, and 14.6% age 65 or older. The gender makeup of the city was 50.6% male and 49.4% female.

Racial composition as of the 2020 census
Race	Number	Percent
White	1,041	92.5%
Black or African American	7	0.6%
American Indian and Alaska Native	1	0.1%
Asian	4	0.4%
Native Hawaiian and Other Pacific Islander	0	0.0%
Some other race	20	1.8%
Two or more races	52	4.6%
Hispanic or Latino (of any race)	43	3.8%

=== 2010 census ===
As of the census of 2010, there were 978 people, 444 households, and 252 families living in the city. The population density was 914.0 inhabitants per square mile (352.9/km^{2}). There were 492 housing units at an average density of 459.8 per square mile (177.5/km^{2}). The racial makeup of the city was 98.0% White, 0.3% African American, 0.1% Asian, 0.6% from other races, and 1.0% from two or more races. Hispanic or Latino of any race were 2.0% of the population.

There were 444 households, of which 27.0% had children under the age of 18 living with them, 43.9% were married couples living together, 9.9% had a female householder with no husband present, 2.9% had a male householder with no wife present, and 43.2% were non-families. 31.5% of all households were made up of individuals, and 10.8% had someone living alone who was 65 years of age or older. The average household size was 2.20 and the average family size was 2.84.

The median age in the city was 34.9 years. 21.5% of residents were under the age of 18; 13.7% were between the ages of 18 and 24; 23.9% were from 25 to 44; 27.7% were from 45 to 64; and 13.2% were 65 years of age or older. The gender makeup of the city was 51.7% male and 48.3% female.

=== 2000 census ===
As of the census of 2000, there were 1,058 people, 452 households, and 269 families living in the city. The population density was 1,006.8 inhabitants per square mile (388.7/km^{2}). There were 482 housing units at an average density of 458.7 per square mile (177.1/km^{2}). The racial makeup of the city was 98.87% White, 0.19% African American, 0.09% Native American, 0.19% Asian, and 0.66% from two or more races. Hispanic or Latino of any race were 0.47% of the population.

There were 452 households, out of which 27.2% had children under the age of 18 living with them, 49.8% were married couples living together, 7.1% had a female householder with no husband present, and 40.3% were non-families. 30.3% of all households were made up of individuals, and 14.6% had someone living alone who was 65 years of age or older. The average household size was 2.33 and the average family size was 2.97.

In the city, the population was spread out, with 23.3% under the age of 18, 14.7% from 18 to 24, 26.6% from 25 to 44, 18.6% from 45 to 64, and 16.8% who were 65 years of age or older. The median age was 36 years. For every 100 females, there were 105.0 males. For every 100 females age 18 and over, there were 104.8 males.

The median income for a household in the city was $36,250, and the median income for a family was $50,063. Males had a median income of $29,875 versus $21,708 for females. The per capita income for the city was $17,958. About 3.4% of families and 9.6% of the population were below the poverty line, including 5.7% of those under age 18 and 17.5% of those age 65 or over.

== Education ==
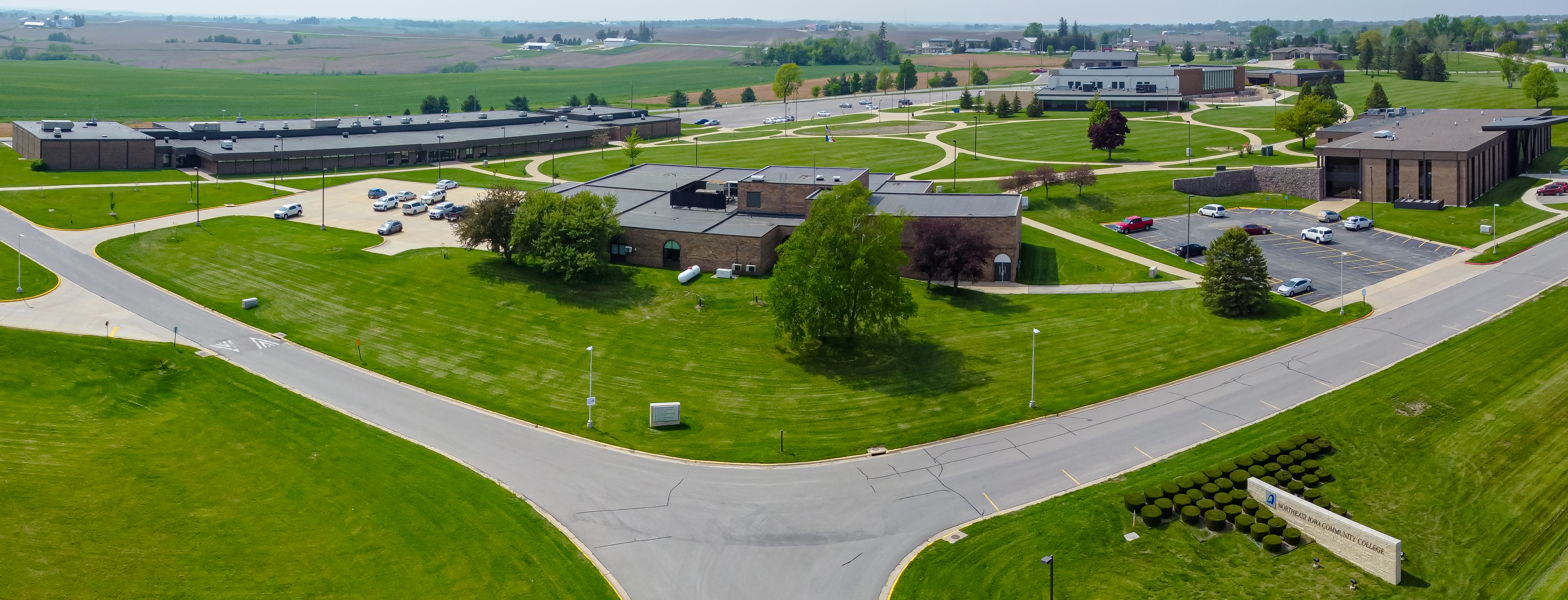
Northeast Iowa Community College

Calmar is home to one of two campuses of Northeast Iowa Community College.

The community is within the South Winneshiek Community School District. South Winneshiek High School is in Calmar. Its elementary and middle schools are in Ossian.

CFS Catholic School formed as a consolidation of Catholic schools in Calmar, Festina, and Spillville. Prior to fall 2020 its campuses are St. Aloysius Center in Calmar and St. Wenceslaus Center in Spillville. In 2019 CFS and St. Theresa of Calcutta in Ossian announced plans to consolidate into a single school, with the Calmar campus closing. Beginning fall 2020 the Ossian campus will house grades K-2 and middle school while the Spillville campus will house grades 3-4.

== Notable person ==
- John Brayshaw Kaye - poet and former mayor of Calmar
