= Ossian, Iowa =

- City
- Location of Ossian, Iowa
- Coordinates: 43°8′47″N 91°45′50″W
- Country: United States
- State: Iowa
- County: Winneshiek
- Incorporated: February 10, 1876

Area
  - Total: 1.07 sq mi (2.77 km^{2})
  - Land: 1.07 sq mi (2.77 km^{2})
  - Water: 0 sq mi (0.00 km^{2})
- Elevation: 1,266 ft (386 m)

Population (2020)
  - Total: 802
  - Density: 750.8/sq mi (289.88/km^{2})
- Time zone: UTC-6 (Central (CST))
  - Summer (DST): UTC-5 (CDT)
- ZIP code: 52161
- Area code: 563
- FIPS code: 19-59970
- GNIS feature ID: 0459910

Ossian (pronounced|ˈosh-ain) is a city in Winneshiek County, Iowa, United States. The population was 802 at the time of the 2020 census.

== History ==
Ossian was platted in 1855. It was named for its founder, John Ossian Porter.

== Geography ==
Ossian is located at 43°8′47″N 91°45′50″W (43.146498, -91.763842).

According to the United States Census Bureau, the city has a total area of 1.11 square miles (2.87 km^{2}), all land.

== Demographics ==
Historical populations
Year	Pop.	±%
1880	444	—
1890	609	+37.2%
1900	670	+10.0%
1910	749	+11.8%
1920	858	+14.6%
1930	740	−13.8%
1940	822	+11.1%
1950	804	−2.2%
1960	827	+2.9%
1970	847	+2.4%
1980	829	−2.1%
1990	810	−2.3%
2000	853	+5.3%
2010	845	−0.9%
2020	802	−5.1%
Source:"U.S. Census website". United States Census Bureau. and Iowa Data Center; Source: U.S. Decennial Census

=== 2020 census ===
As of the census of 2020, there were 802 people, 346 households, and 213 families residing in the city. The population density was 750.8 inhabitants per square mile (289.9/km^{2}). There were 357 housing units at an average density of 334.2 per square mile (129.0/km^{2}). The racial makeup of the city was 92.9% White, 0.1% Black or African American, 0.2% Native American, 0.2% Asian, 0.0% Pacific Islander, 3.4% from other races and 3.1% from two or more races. Hispanic or Latino persons of any race comprised 6.5% of the population.

Of the 346 households, 27.5% of which had children under the age of 18 living with them, 51.7% were married couples living together, 6.1% were cohabitating couples, 24.0% had a female householder with no spouse or partner present and 18.2% had a male householder with no spouse or partner present. 38.4% of all households were non-families. 34.1% of all households were made up of individuals, 17.3% had someone living alone who was 65 years old or older.

The median age in the city was 45.8 years. 22.4% of the residents were under the age of 20; 4.1% were between the ages of 20 and 24; 22.4% were from 25 and 44; 25.1% were from 45 and 64; and 25.9% were 65 years of age or older. The gender makeup of the city was 48.8% male and 51.2% female.

=== 2010 census ===
As of the census of 2010, there were 845 people, 339 households, and 223 families living in the city. The population density was 761.3 inhabitants per square mile (293.9/km^{2}). There were 360 housing units at an average density of 324.3 per square mile (125.2/km^{2}). The racial makeup of the city was 98.5% White, 0.2% Asian, 0.7% from other races, and 0.6% from two or more races. Hispanic or Latino of any race were 3.3% of the population.

There were 339 households, of which 28.6% had children under the age of 18 living with them, 54.0% were married couples living together, 7.4% had a female householder with no husband present, 4.4% had a male householder with no wife present, and 34.2% were non-families. 28.6% of all households were made up of individuals, and 12.7% had someone living alone who was 65 years of age or older. The average household size was 2.36 and the average family size was 2.91.

The median age in the city was 42.8 years. 22.7% of residents were under the age of 18; 8.6% were between the ages of 18 and 24; 22% were from 25 to 44; 24.4% were from 45 to 64; and 22.2% were 65 years of age or older. The gender makeup of the city was 48.6% male and 51.4% female.

=== 2000 census ===
As of the census of 2000, there were 853 people, 330 households, and 220 families living in the city. The population density was 778.7 inhabitants per square mile (300.7/km^{2}). There were 350 housing units at an average density of 319.5 per square mile (123.4/km^{2}). The racial makeup of the city was 99.65% White, 0.12% African American, 0.12% Native American, and 0.12% from two or more races. Hispanic or Latino of any race were 0.35% of the population.

There were 330 households, out of which 33.6% had children under the age of 18 living with them, 57.9% were married couples living together, 5.5% had a female householder with no husband present, and 33.3% were non-families. 29.7% of all households were made up of individuals, and 17.9% had someone living alone who was 65 years of age or older. The average household size was 2.47 and the average family size was 3.09.

27.8% were under the age of 18, 5.0% from 18 to 24, 26.0% from 25 to 44, 18.6% from 45 to 64, and 22.5% were 65 years of age or older. The median age was 39 years. For every 100 females, there were 93.9 males. For every 100 females age 18 and over, there were 86.1 males.

The median income for a household in the city was $38,214, and the median income for a family was $44,306. Males had a median income of $30,500 versus $20,781 for females. The per capita income for the city was $16,490. About 3.0% of families and 5.8% of the population were below the poverty line, including 4.5% of those under age 18 and 15.7% of those age 65 or over.

== Education ==
The community is within the South Winneshiek Community School District.

== Notable people ==
- Raymond Philip Etteldorf, Roman Catholic archbishop
- Al Palzer, heavyweight boxer
