= Winneshiek County, Iowa =

County in Iowa, United States

- County
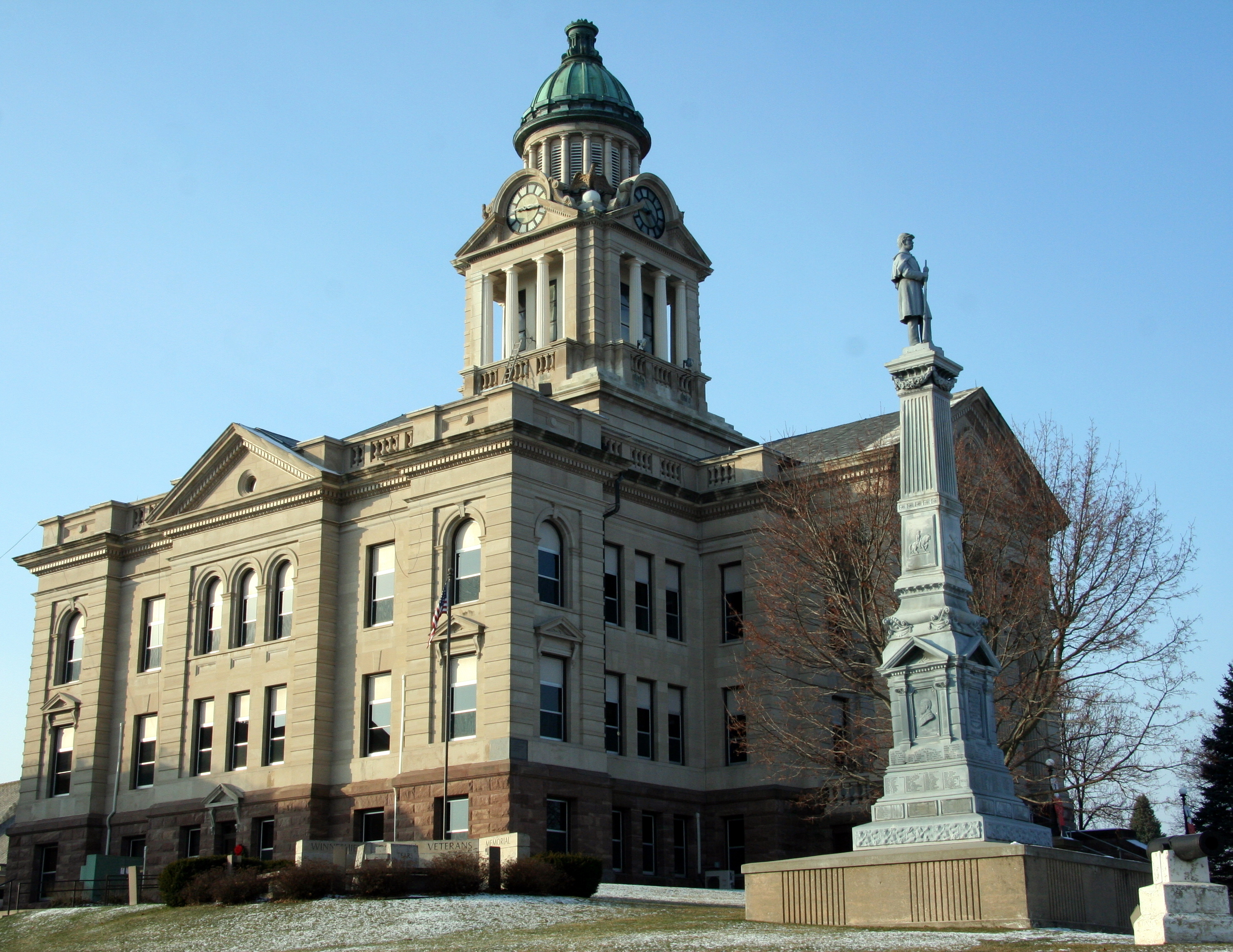
- The Courthouse and Civil War Monument located in Decorah

- Flag

- Location within the U.S. state of Iowa
- Coordinates: 43°17′00″N 91°52′00″W
- Country: United States
- State: Iowa
- Founded: 1847
- Named for: Chief Winneshiek
- Seat: Decorah
- Largest city: Decorah

Area
  - Total: 690 sq mi (1,800 km^{2})
  - Land: 690 sq mi (1,800 km^{2})
  - Water: 0.3 sq mi (0.78 km^{2}) 0.04%

Population (2020)
  - Total: 20,070
  - Estimate (2025): 19,733 ▼
  - Density: 29/sq mi (11/km^{2})
- Time zone: UTC−6 (Central)
  - Summer (DST): UTC−5 (CDT)
- Congressional district: 1st
- Website: winneshiekcounty.iowa.gov
- Iowa county number 96

Winneshiek County is a county located in the U.S. state of Iowa. As of the 2020 census, the population was 20,070. The county seat is Decorah.

== History ==
A largely rural and agricultural county, Winneshiek County has a rich cultural history from Czech, Slovak, English, Irish, German, Swiss, and Norwegian immigrants that have settled within its boundaries.

The county was originally settled in 1848 in present-day Bloomfield Township (near Castalia, Iowa) and in Washington Township (near Fort Atkinson, Iowa). It was organized in 1847, and named after a chief of the Ho-Chunk tribe.

In 1980, Winneshiek County reported a population of 21,842. Like much of Iowa during the 1980s it witnessed a population loss, dropping to 20,847 according to the 1990 United States Census. However, during the 1990s the county experienced some mild growth and was able to rise above the 21,000 mark once again.

== Government and elected officials ==
As of 2010, the Winneshiek County government had a total of 785 employees and staff.

== Politics ==
Like all Iowa counties, Winneshiek is governed by an elected partisan Board of Supervisors. Winneshiek County's Board of Supervisors has five members elected by single-member districts of equal population. Other elected officials are the county attorney, auditor, sheriff and treasurer. The offices for the supervisors and county officers are located in the County Courthouse at the county seat.

=== Political culture ===
United States presidential election results for Winneshiek County, Iowa
Year	Republican		Democratic		Third party(ies)	
Year	No.	%	No.	%	No.	%
1896	3,422	61.75%	2,033	36.68%	87	1.57%
1900	3,486	64.72%	1,835	34.07%	65	1.21%
1904	3,383	68.96%	1,467	29.90%	56	1.14%
1908	2,767	56.79%	2,008	41.22%	97	1.99%
1912	802	15.63%	2,105	41.03%	2,223	43.33%
1916	2,876	57.87%	1,956	39.36%	138	2.78%
1920	6,684	75.98%	1,933	21.97%	180	2.05%
1924	4,154	43.96%	1,510	15.98%	3,786	40.06%
1928	5,084	52.46%	4,535	46.79%	73	0.75%
1932	3,348	32.40%	6,823	66.03%	162	1.57%
1936	4,489	40.15%	5,980	53.48%	712	6.37%
1940	6,208	53.35%	5,405	46.45%	24	0.21%
1944	5,318	53.76%	4,557	46.06%	18	0.18%
1948	4,594	47.54%	4,905	50.76%	164	1.70%
1952	7,154	66.64%	3,560	33.16%	22	0.20%
1956	6,192	59.20%	4,251	40.64%	17	0.16%
1960	5,737	54.48%	4,786	45.45%	7	0.07%
1964	3,941	40.38%	5,811	59.55%	7	0.07%
1968	5,600	60.09%	3,364	36.10%	355	3.81%
1972	5,877	56.23%	4,401	42.11%	174	1.66%
1976	4,765	52.08%	4,158	45.45%	226	2.47%
1980	5,033	54.10%	3,201	34.40%	1,070	11.50%
1984	5,277	57.96%	3,724	40.90%	104	1.14%
1988	4,194	48.07%	4,443	50.92%	88	1.01%
1992	3,331	34.61%	3,791	39.39%	2,502	26.00%
1996	3,532	40.27%	4,122	47.00%	1,116	12.73%
2000	4,647	49.35%	4,339	46.08%	431	4.58%
2004	5,324	49.37%	5,354	49.65%	106	0.98%
2008	4,273	37.87%	6,829	60.52%	182	1.61%
2012	4,622	41.70%	6,256	56.44%	206	1.86%
2016	5,344	47.03%	5,254	46.24%	764	6.72%
2020	6,235	51.68%	5,617	46.56%	212	1.76%
2024	6,427	53.65%	5,321	44.42%	231	1.93%

== Geography ==
According to the United States Census Bureau, the county has a total area of 690 square miles (1,800 km^{2}), of which 690 square miles (1,800 km^{2}) is land and 0.3 square miles (0.78 km^{2}) (0.04%) is water.

=== Major highways ===
- U.S. Highway 52
- Iowa Highway 9
- Iowa Highway 24
- Iowa Highway 139
- Iowa Highway 150

=== Adjacent counties ===
- Fillmore County, Minnesota (northwest)
- Houston County, Minnesota (northeast)
- Allamakee County (east)
- Fayette County (south)
- Chickasaw County (southwest)
- Howard County (west)
- Clayton County (southeast)

== Demographics ==
Historical population
Census	Pop.	Note	%±
1850	546		—
1860	13,942		2,453.5%
1870	23,570		69.1%
1880	23,938		1.6%
1890	22,528		−5.9%
1900	23,731		5.3%
1910	21,729		−8.4%
1920	22,091		1.7%
1930	21,630		−2.1%
1940	22,263		2.9%
1950	21,639		−2.8%
1960	21,651		0.1%
1970	21,758		0.5%
1980	21,876		0.5%
1990	20,847		−4.7%
2000	21,310		2.2%
2010	21,056		−1.2%
2020	20,070		−4.7%
2025 (est.)	19,733	▼	−1.7%
U.S. Decennial Census; 1790–1960 1900–1990; 1990–2000 2010–2020

=== 2020 census ===
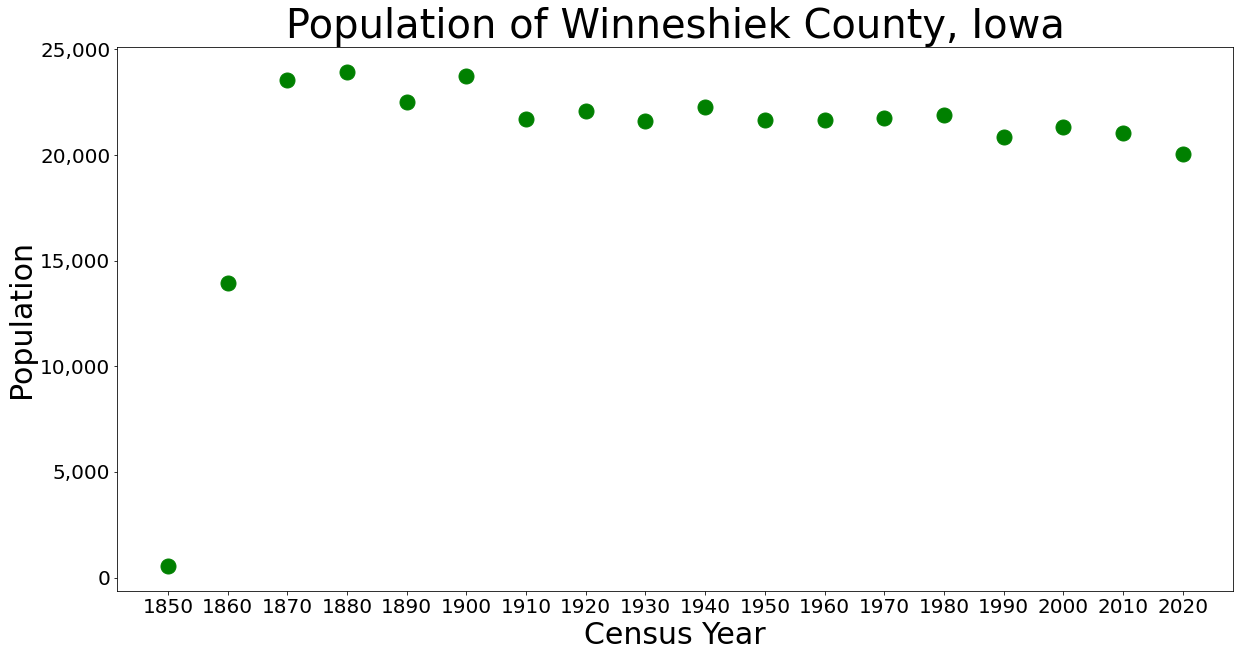
Population of Winneshiek County from the U.S. census data

As of the 2020 census, the county had a population of 20,070, a population density of 28.9/sq mi (11.2/km^{2}), and 8,916 housing units, of which 8.4% were vacant and 8,170 were occupied.

The median age was 42.6 years, 19.3% of residents were under the age of 18, and 21.7% were 65 years of age or older. For every 100 females there were 98.7 males, and for every 100 females age 18 and over there were 96.4 males.

There were 8,170 households, of which 24.5% had children under the age of 18 living in them. Of all households, 53.2% were married-couple households, 19.0% were households with a male householder and no spouse or partner present, and 21.8% were households with a female householder and no spouse or partner present. About 30.6% of all households were made up of individuals and 14.7% had someone living alone who was 65 years of age or older. Among occupied housing units, 75.9% were owner-occupied and 24.1% were renter-occupied, with a homeowner vacancy rate of 1.0% and a rental vacancy rate of 5.6%.

97.2% of the population reported being of a single race: 93.9% White, 0.7% Black or African American, 0.2% American Indian and Alaska Native, 0.9% Asian, 0.1% Native Hawaiian and Pacific Islander, 1.5% from some other race, and 2.8% from two or more races. Hispanic or Latino residents of any race comprised 2.9% of the population.

39.8% of residents lived in urban areas while 60.2% lived in rural areas.

Winneshiek County Racial Composition
Race	Number	Percent
White (NH)	18,705	93.2%
Black or African American (NH)	119	0.6%
Native American (NH)	19	0.1%
Asian (NH)	178	0.9%
Pacific Islander (NH)	12	0.06%
Other/Mixed (NH)	452	2.3%
Hispanic or Latino	585	3%

=== 2010 census ===
As of the 2010 census recorded a population of 21,056 in the county, with a population density of 30.5/sq mi (11.8/km^{2}). There were 8,721 housing units, of which 7,997 were occupied.

=== 2000 census ===
As of the 2000 census, there were 21,310 people, 7,734 households, and 5,189 families residing in the county. The population density was 31 people per square mile (12 people/km^{2}). There were 8,208 housing units at an average density of 12 per square mile (4.6/km^{2}). The racial makeup of the county was 97.85% White, 0.51% Black or African American, 0.08% Native American, 0.82% Asian, 0.24% from other races, and 0.50% from two or more races. 0.80% of the population were Hispanic or Latino of any race. 38.3% were of German, 31.7% Norwegian, 5.5% Irish and 5.1% Czech ancestry.

There were 7,734 households, out of which 30.9% had children under the age of 18 living with them, 58.9% were married couples living together, 5.5% had a female householder with no husband present, and 32.9% were non-families. 27.6% of all households were made up of individuals, and 12.3% had someone living alone who was 65 years of age or older. The average household size was 2.46 and the average family size was 3.03.

In the county, the population was spread out, with 23.0% under the age of 18, 16.7% from 18 to 24, 24.2% from 25 to 44, 20.4% from 45 to 64, and 15.7% who were 65 years of age or older. The median age was 36 years. For every 100 females there were 96.8 males. For every 100 females age 18 and over, there were 94.3 males.

The median income for a household in the county was $38,908, and the median income for a family was $45,966. Males had a median income of $29,278 versus $21,240 for females. The per capita income for the county was $17,047. About 5.1% of families and 8.0% of the population were below the poverty line, including 6.5% of those under age 18 and 10.5% of those age 65 or over.

== Communities ==
=== Cities ===
- Calmar
- Castalia
- Decorah
- Fort Atkinson
- Jackson Junction
- Ossian
- Ridgeway
- Spillville

=== Census-designated place ===
- Burr Oak

=== Other unincorporated communities ===
- Bluffton
- Festina
- Frankville
- Freeport
- Highlandville
- Hesper
- Kendallville
- Morgan

=== Townships ===
- Bloomfield
- Bluffton
- Burr Oak
- Calmar
- Canoe
- Decorah
- Frankville
- Fremont
- Glenwood
- Hesper
- Highland
- Jackson
- Lincoln
- Madison
- Military
- Orleans
- Pleasant
- Springfield
- Sumner
- Washington

=== Ghost towns ===
- Conover
- Moneek
- Sattre
- Canoe

=== Population ranking ===
The population ranking of the following table is based on the 2020 census of Winneshiek County.

† county seat

Rank	City/town/etc.	Municipal type	Population (2020 Census)
1	† Decorah	City	7,587
2	Calmar	City	1,125
3	Ossian	City	802
4	Spillville	City	385
5	Fort Atkinson	City	312
6	Ridgeway	City	275
7	Burr Oak	CDP	171
8	Castalia	City	145
9	Jackson Junction	City	37

== Education ==
The following school districts have their administrative headquarters in the county:

- Decorah Community School District
- South Winneshiek Community School District
- Turkey Valley Community School District

North Winneshiek Community School District was in the county, until it merged with Decorah CSD on July 1, 2018. The Decorah district and the Mabel-Canton Public Schools in Minnesota have an agreement where people who live in the Decorah district but closer to the Mabel-Canton schools than to Decorah schools can enroll in Mabel-Canton schools.

The following school districts have their administrative headquarters outside of the county but serve sections of Winneshiek County:

- Allamakee Community School District
- Howard–Winneshiek Community School District
- Postville Community School District

== See also ==
- National Register of Historic Places listings in Winneshiek County, Iowa
