= 2004 Iowa Senate election =

- November 2, 2004

25 out of 50 seats in the Iowa State Senate 26 seats needed for a majority
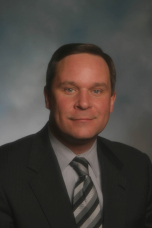

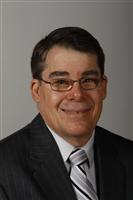
| | Majority party | Minority party |
|---|---|---|
| Leader | Jeff Lamberti | Michael Gronstal |
| Party | Republican | Democratic |
| Leader's seat | 35th | 50th |
| Seats before | 29 | 21 |
| Seats after | 25 | 25 |
| Seat change | ▼4 | ▲4 |
- Results of the elections: Democratic gain Republican gain Democratic hold Republican hold No election
President of the Senate before election
Jeff Lamberti
Republican
Elected President of the Senate
Jack Kibbie & Jeff Lamberti
Democratic & Republican, respectively

The 2004 Iowa State Senate elections took place as part of the biennial 2004 United States elections. Iowa voters elected state senators in half of the state senate's districts—the 25 even-numbered state senate districts. State senators serve four-year terms in the Iowa State Senate, with half of the seats up for election each cycle.

The primary election on June 8, 2004, determined which candidates appeared on the November 2, 2004 general election ballot. Primary election results can be obtained here. General election results can be obtained here.

On election day in November 2004, Republicans had control of the Iowa state Senate with 29 seats. To take control of the chamber from Republicans, the Democrats needed to net 5 Senate seats. The result of the 2004 election was an evenly divided Iowa state Senate, with Democrats netting 4 flips and the resulting balance being 25 seats held both by Democrats and Republicans. As a result, Jeff Lamberti, and Jack Kibbie were deemed co-Senate Presidents for the Republican & Democratic halves, respectively.

== Predictions ==
| Source | Ranking | As of |
|---|---|---|
| Rothenberg | Lean R | October 1, 2004 |

== Summary of Results ==
- NOTE: Only even-numbered Iowa Senate seats were up for regularly scheduled election in 2004.

| State Senate District | Incumbent | Party | Elected Senator | Party |
|---|---|---|---|---|
| 2nd | Kenneth Veenstra | Rep | Dave Mulder | Republican |
| 4th | Jack Kibbie | Dem | Jack Kibbie | Democratic |
| 6th | E. Thurman Gaskill | Rep | E. Thurman Gaskill | Republican |
| 8th | Mark Zieman | Rep | Mark Zieman | Republican |
| 10th | Donald Redfern | Rep | Jeff Danielson | Democratic |
| 12th | Kitty Rehberg | Rep | Brian Schoenjahn | Democratic |
| 14th | Mike Connolly | Dem | Mike Connolly | Democratic |
| 16th | Julie Hosch | Rep | Tom Hancock | Democratic |
| 18th | Mary Lundby | Rep | Mary Lundby | Republican |
| 20th | John Putney | Rep | John Putney | Republican |
| 22nd | Larry McKibben | Rep | Larry McKibben | Republican |
| 24th | Jerry Behn | Rep | Jerry Behn | Republican |
| 26th | Steve Kettering | Rep | Steve Kettering | Republican |
| 28th | James A. Seymour | Rep | James A. Seymour | Republican |
| 30th | Pat Ward | Rep | Pat Ward | Republican |
| 32nd | Jack Holveck | Dem | Brad Zaun | Republican |
| 34th | Dick Dearden | Dem | Dick Dearden | Democratic |
| 36th | Paul McKinley | Rep | Paul McKinley | Republican |
| 38th | Neal Schuerer | Rep | Tom Rielly | Democratic |
| 40th | Richard F. Drake | Rep | James F. Hahn | Republican |
| 42nd | Bryan Sievers | Rep | Frank Wood | Democratic |
| 44th | Thomas G. Courtney | Dem | Thomas G. Courtney | Democratic |
| 46th | Gene Fraise | Dem | Gene Fraise | Democratic |
| 48th | Jeff Angelo | Rep | Jeff Angelo | Republican |
| 50th | Michael Gronstal | Dem | Michael Gronstal | Democratic |

== Detailed Results ==
- Note: If a district does not list a primary, then that district did not have a competitive primary (i.e., there may have only been one candidate file for that district).

=== District 2 ===
Iowa Senate, District 2 Republican Primary, 2004
| Party | Candidate | Votes | % |
|---|---|---|---|
| Republican | Dave Mulder | 6,141 | 54.5 |
| Republican | Kenneth Veenstra (incumbent) | 5,128 | 45.5 |
| Total votes | | 11,269 | 100.0 |

Iowa Senate, District 2 General Election, 2004
| Party | Candidate | Votes | % |
|---|---|---|---|
| Republican | Dave Mulder | 24,433 | 100.0 |
| Total votes | | 24,433 | 100.0 |
| Republican hold | | | |

=== District 4 ===
Iowa Senate, District 4 General Election, 2004
| Party | Candidate | Votes | % |
|---|---|---|---|
| Democratic | Jack Kibbie (incumbent) | 17,642 | 60.0 |
| Republican | Harley Kohlhaas | 11,764 | 40.0 |
| Total votes | | 29,406 | 100.0 |
| Democratic hold | | | |

=== District 6 ===
Iowa Senate, District 6 General Election, 2004
| Party | Candidate | Votes | % |
|---|---|---|---|
| Republican | E. Thurman Gaskill (incumbent) | 17,192 | 58.5 |
| Democratic | John Drury | 12,213 | 41.5 |
| Total votes | | 29,405 | 100.0 |
| Republican hold | | | |

=== District 8 ===
Iowa Senate, District 8 General Election, 2004
| Party | Candidate | Votes | % |
|---|---|---|---|
| Republican | Mark Zieman (incumbent) | 15,682 | 55.5 |
| Democratic | John Beard | 12,593 | 44.5 |
| Total votes | | 28,275 | 100.0 |
| Republican hold | | | |

=== District 10 ===
Iowa Senate, District 10 Democratic Primary, 2004
| Party | Candidate | Votes | % |
|---|---|---|---|
| Democratic | Jeff Danielson | 967 | 80.2 |
| Democratic | Bob Krause | 239 | 19.8 |
| Total votes | | 1,206 | 100.0 |

Iowa Senate, District 10 General Election, 2004
| Party | Candidate | Votes | % |
|---|---|---|---|
| Democratic | Jeff Danielson | 16,712 | 53.9 |
| Republican | Frank Dowie | 14,281 | 46.1 |
| Total votes | | 30,993 | 100.0 |
| Democratic gain from Republican | | | |

=== District 12 ===
Iowa Senate, District 12 Republican Primary, 2004
| Party | Candidate | Votes | % |
|---|---|---|---|
| Republican | Ron Longmuir | 1,365 | 63.0 |
| Republican | Steve Huff | 803 | 37.0 |
| Total votes | | 2,168 | 100.0 |

Iowa Senate, District 12 Democratic Primary, 2004
| Party | Candidate | Votes | % |
|---|---|---|---|
| Democratic | Brian Schoenjahn | 1,101 | 60.3 |
| Democratic | Peg Erdman | 725 | 39.7 |
| Total votes | | 1,826 | 100.0 |

Iowa Senate, District 12 General Election, 2004
| Party | Candidate | Votes | % |
|---|---|---|---|
| Democratic | Brian Schoenjahn | 14,677 | 52.8 |
| Republican | Ron Longmuir | 13,123 | 47.2 |
| Total votes | | 27,800 | 100.0 |
| Democratic gain from Republican | | | |

=== District 14 ===
Iowa Senate, District 14 General Election, 2004
| Party | Candidate | Votes | % |
|---|---|---|---|
| Democratic | Mike Connolly (incumbent) | 21,685 | 100.0 |
| Total votes | | 21,685 | 100.0 |
| Democratic hold | | | |

=== District 16 ===
Iowa Senate, District 16 General Election, 2004
| Party | Candidate | Votes | % |
|---|---|---|---|
| Democratic | Tom Hancock | 15,324 | 50.2 |
| Republican | Julie Hosch (incumbent) | 15,202 | 49.8 |
| Total votes | | 30,526 | 100.0 |
| Democratic gain from Republican | | | |

=== District 18 ===
Iowa Senate, District 18 General Election, 2004
| Party | Candidate | Votes | % |
|---|---|---|---|
| Republican | Mary Lundby (incumbent) | 20,686 | 59.8 |
| Democratic | Lorna M. Richards | 13,923 | 40.2 |
| Total votes | | 34,609 | 100.0 |
| Republican hold | | | |

=== District 20 ===
Iowa Senate, District 20 General Election, 2004
| Party | Candidate | Votes | % |
|---|---|---|---|
| Republican | John Putney (incumbent) | 21,784 | 100.0 |
| Total votes | | 21,784 | 100.0 |
| Republican hold | | | |

=== District 22 ===
Iowa Senate, District 22 General Election, 2004
| Party | Candidate | Votes | % |
|---|---|---|---|
| Republican | Larry McKibben (incumbent) | 14,185 | 51.4 |
| Democratic | Wayne Sawtelle | 13,398 | 48.6 |
| Total votes | | 27,583 | 100.0 |
| Republican hold | | | |

=== District 24 ===
Iowa Senate, District 24 General Election, 2004
| Party | Candidate | Votes | % |
|---|---|---|---|
| Republican | Jerry Behn (incumbent) | 19,409 | 57.4 |
| Democratic | Russell D. Wiesley | 14,412 | 42.6 |
| Total votes | | 33,821 | 100.0 |
| Republican hold | | | |

=== District 26 ===
Iowa Senate, District 26 General Election, 2004
| Party | Candidate | Votes | % |
|---|---|---|---|
| Republican | Steve Kettering (incumbent) | 19,458 | 100.0 |
| Total votes | | 19,458 | 100.0 |
| Republican hold | | | |

=== District 28 ===
Iowa Senate, District 28 General Election, 2004
| Party | Candidate | Votes | % |
|---|---|---|---|
| Republican | James Seymour (incumbent) | 24,918 | 100.0 |
| Total votes | | 24,918 | 100.0 |
| Republican hold | | | |

=== District 30 ===
Iowa Senate, District 30 General Election, 2004
| Party | Candidate | Votes | % |
|---|---|---|---|
| Republican | Pat Ward (incumbent) | 19,798 | 61.8 |
| Democratic | Satro Narayan | 11,486 | 35.9 |
| Libertarian | Sean Edward Martin | 727 | 2.3 |
| Total votes | | 32,011 | 100.0 |
| Republican hold | | | |

=== District 32 ===
Iowa Senate, District 32 General Election, 2004
| Party | Candidate | Votes | % |
|---|---|---|---|
| Republican | Brad Zaun | 20,088 | 57.9 |
| Democratic | Laura Sands | 14,595 | 42.1 |
| Total votes | | 34,683 | 100.0 |
| Republican gain from Democratic | | | |

=== District 34 ===
Iowa Senate, District 34 General Election, 2004
| Party | Candidate | Votes | % |
|---|---|---|---|
| Democratic | Dick Dearden (incumbent) | 19,346 | 100.0 |
| Total votes | | 19,346 | 100.0 |
| Democratic hold | | | |

=== District 36 ===
Iowa Senate, District 36 General Election, 2004
| Party | Candidate | Votes | % |
|---|---|---|---|
| Republican | Paul McKinley (incumbent) | 17,029 | 60.3 |
| Democratic | Dave Sextro | 11,198 | 39.7 |
| Total votes | | 28,227 | 100.0 |
| Republican hold | | | |

=== District 38 ===
Iowa Senate, District 38 General Election, 2004
| Party | Candidate | Votes | % |
|---|---|---|---|
| Democratic | Tom Rielly | 14,679 | 51.6 |
| Republican | Neal Schuerer (incumbent) | 13,791 | 48.4 |
| Total votes | | 28,470 | 100.0 |
| Democratic gain from Republican | | | |

=== District 40 ===
Iowa Senate, District 40 General Election, 2004
| Party | Candidate | Votes | % |
|---|---|---|---|
| Republican | James F. Hahn | 14,485 | 53.6 |
| Democratic | Thomas L. Fiegen | 12,564 | 46.4 |
| Total votes | | 27,049 | 100.0 |
| Republican hold | | | |

=== District 42 ===
Iowa Senate, District 42 Democratic Primary, 2004
| Party | Candidate | Votes | % |
|---|---|---|---|
| Democratic | Frank Wood | 649 | 69.6 |
| Democratic | Dennis G. Starling | 283 | 30.4 |
| Total votes | | 932 | 100.0 |

Iowa Senate, District 42 General Election, 2004
| Party | Candidate | Votes | % |
|---|---|---|---|
| Democratic | Frank Wood | 15,500 | 50.8 |
| Republican | Bryan Sievers (incumbent) | 15,020 | 49.2 |
| Total votes | | 30,520 | 100.0 |
| Democratic gain from Republican | | | |

=== District 44 ===
Iowa Senate, District 44 General Election, 2004
| Party | Candidate | Votes | % |
|---|---|---|---|
| Democratic | Thomas G. Courtney (incumbent) | 19,777 | 100.0 |
| Total votes | | 19,777 | 100.0 |
| Democratic hold | | | |

=== District 46 ===
Iowa Senate, District 46 General Election, 2004
| Party | Candidate | Votes | % |
|---|---|---|---|
| Democratic | Gene Fraise (incumbent) | 14,272 | 53.3 |
| Republican | Doug P. Abolt | 12,532 | 46.7 |
| Total votes | | 26,804 | 100.0 |
| Democratic hold | | | |

=== District 48 ===
Iowa Senate, District 48 General Election, 2004
| Party | Candidate | Votes | % |
|---|---|---|---|
| Republican | Jeff Angelo (incumbent) | 14,981 | 54.0 |
| Democratic | Steve Waterman | 12,776 | 46.0 |
| Total votes | | 27,757 | 100.0 |
| Republican hold | | | |

=== District 50 ===
Iowa Senate, District 50 General Election, 2004
| Party | Candidate | Votes | % |
|---|---|---|---|
| Democratic | Michael Gronstal (incumbent) | 12,480 | 54.5 |
| Republican | Loren Knauss | 10,413 | 45.5 |
| Total votes | | 22,893 | 100.0 |
| Democratic hold | | | |

== See also ==
- United States elections, 2004
- United States House of Representatives elections in Iowa, 2004
- Elections in Iowa
