= 2014 Iowa gubernatorial election =

- November 4, 2014
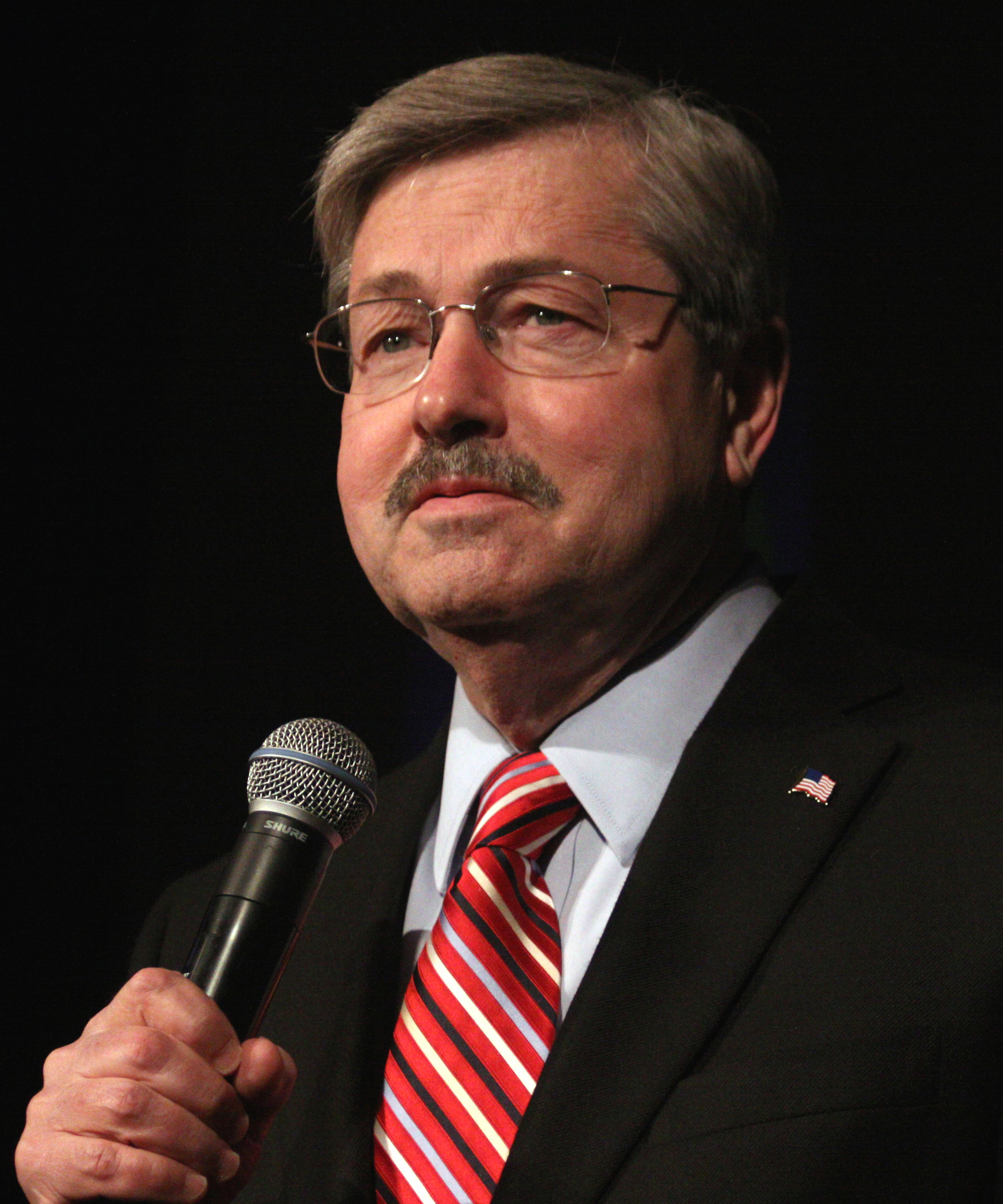

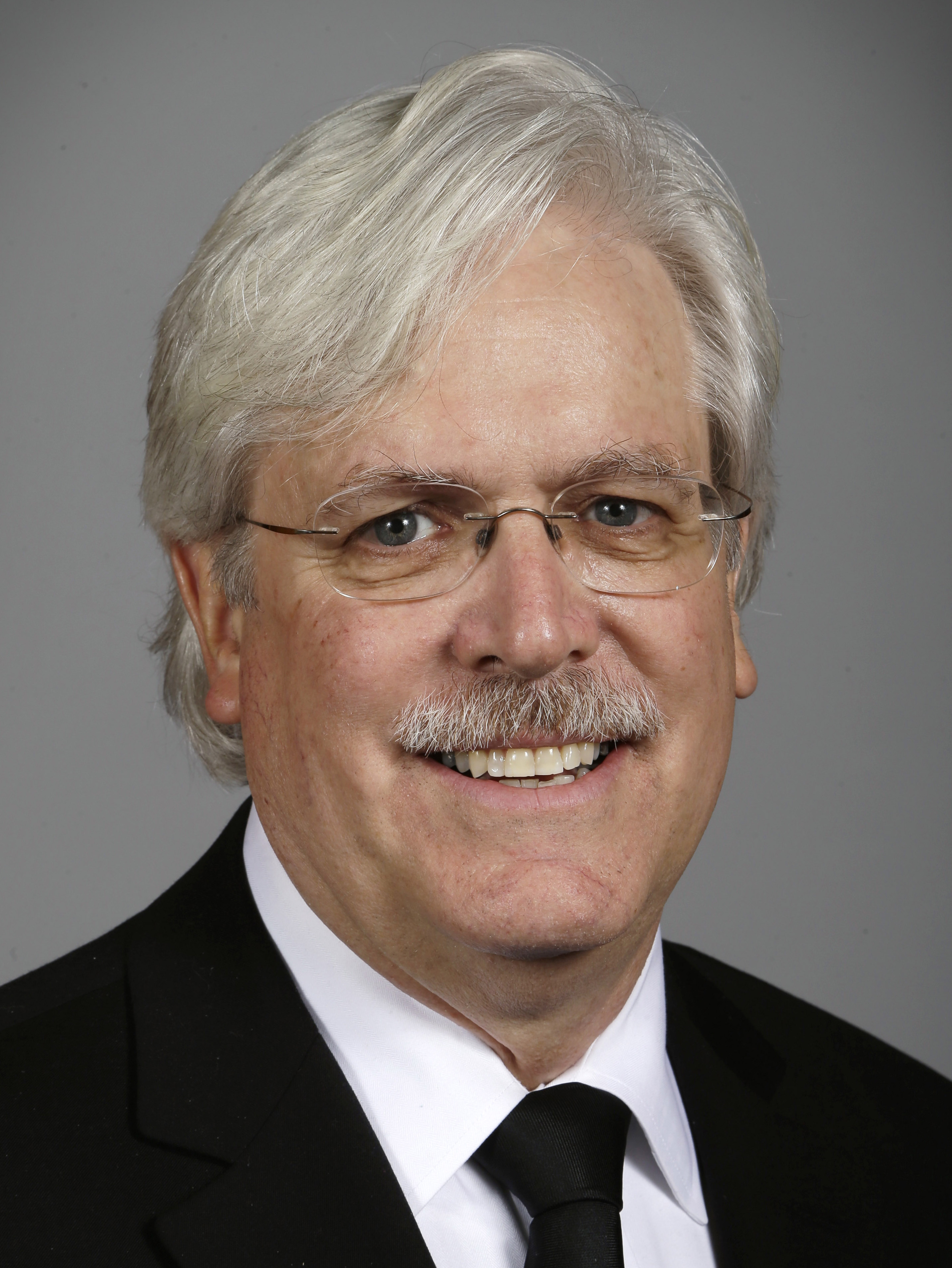
Nominee	Terry Branstad	Jack Hatch
Party	Republican	Democratic
Running mate	Kim Reynolds	Monica Vernon
Popular vote	666,032	420,787
Percentage	58.99%	37.27%
- Branstad: 40–50% 50–60% 60–70% 70–80% 80–90% >90% Hatch: 40–50% 50–60% 60–70% 70–80% 80–90% Tie: 40–50%
Governor before election
Terry Branstad
Republican
Elected Governor
Terry Branstad
Republican

The 2014 Iowa gubernatorial election took place on November 4, 2014. Republican incumbent Terry Branstad ran for reelection to a sixth overall and second consecutive four-year term. Branstad went on to win a historic sixth term as governor by defeating Democratic challenger and State Senator Jack Hatch, and on December 14, 2015, he became the longest-serving governor in American history. He won 59.1% of the popular vote to Hatch's 37.3%, and carried every county in the state except Johnson, home to Iowa City and the University of Iowa. This was one of the nine Republican-held governorships up for election in a state that Barack Obama won in the 2012 presidential election.

== Republican primary ==
=== Candidates ===
==== Declared ====
- Terry Branstad, incumbent governor
- Tom Hoefling, political activist and America's Party and American Independent Party nominee for president in 2012

=== Polling ===
Poll source	Date(s) administered	Sample size	Margin of error	Terry Branstad	Tom Hoefling	Undecided
Public Policy Polling	May 15–19, 2014	303	± 3.3%	66%	12%	22%
Loras College	April 7–8, 2014	600	± 4.0%	80%	4%	14%
Suffolk University	April 3–8, 2014	224	± 6.6%	70%	9%	21%
Public Policy Polling	February 20–23, 2014	283	± 5.8%	70%	11%	18%

==== Results ====
Republican primary results
Party	Candidate	Votes	%
Republican	Terry Branstad (incumbent)	129,712	83.00
Republican	Tom Hoefling	26,284	16.82
Republican	Write-in	279	0.18
Total votes		156,275	100

== Democratic primary ==
Narcisse was disqualified from appearing on the ballot in the Democratic primary following a ruling by the Iowa Supreme Court that upheld a lower court decision that held that Narcisse had not submitted enough valid signatures to be placed on the ballot for the primary election. Narcisse continued his campaign and declared his intention to run for the nomination as a write-in candidate. When he was unsuccessful, he announced that he would be running in the general election as the nominee of the Iowa Party.

=== Candidates ===
==== Declared ====
- Jack Hatch, state senator
- Jonathan Narcisse, former member of the Des Moines School Board and Iowa Party nominee for governor in 2010

==== Withdrew ====
- Paul Dahl, bus driver, retail sales associate, former librarian and candidate for Iowa's 5th congressional district in 1994
- Tyler Olson, state representative and former chairman of the Iowa Democratic Party

==== Declined ====
- Frank Cownie, mayor of Des Moines
- Chet Culver, former governor
- Jeff Danielson, state senator
- Michael Fitzgerald, state treasurer
- Michael Gronstal, majority leader of the Iowa Senate and chairman of the Democratic Legislative Campaign Committee
- Fred Hubbell, insurance executive
- Pam Jochum, president of the Iowa Senate
- Bob Krause, former state representative, nominee for state treasurer in 1978, candidate for mayor of Waterloo in 1982 and candidate for the U.S. Senate in 2010
- Janet Petersen, state senator
- Tom Vilsack, United States secretary of agriculture and former governor

=== Endorsements ===
Jack Hatch

Individuals

- Ako Abdul-Samad, state representative
- Marti Anderson, state representative
- Dennis Black, state senator
- Joe Bolkcom, state senator
- Leonard Boswell, former U.S. representative
- Thomas G. Courtney, state senator
- Preston Daniels, former mayor of Des Moines
- Dick Dearden, state senator
- John Forbes, state representative
- Ruth Ann Gaines, state representative
- Fred Hubbell, insurance executive
- Bruce Hunter, state representative
- Bob Krause, former state representative, nominee for state treasurer in 1978, candidate for mayor of Waterloo in 1982 and candidate for the U.S. Senate in 2010
- Matt McCoy, state senator
- Joe Seng, state senator
- Steve Sodders, state senator
- Rich Taylor, state senator
- Frank Wood, state representative
Tyler Olson

Individuals

- Bruce Bearinger, state representative
- Dennis Cohoon, state representative
- Jeff Danielson, state senator
- David Dawson, state representative
- Nancy Dunkel, state representative
- Bob Dvorsky, state senator
- Sue Dvorsky, former chairwoman of the Iowa Democratic Party
- Chris Hall, state representative
- Rob Hogg, state senator
- Wally Horn, state senator
- David Jacoby, state representative
- Jerry Kearns, state representative
- Dan Kelley, state representative
- Liz Mathis, state senator
- Helen Miller, state representative
- Dan Muhlbauer, state representative
- Jo Oldson, state representative
- Rick Olson, state representative
- Scott Ourth, state representative
- Janet Petersen, state senator
- Todd Prichard, state representative
- Joe Riding, state representative
- Patti Ruff, state representative
- Kirsten Running-Marquardt, state representative
- Brian Schoenjahn, state senator
- Art Staed, state representative
- Sharon S. Steckman, state representative
- Sally Stutsman, state representative
- Todd Taylor, state representative
- Roger Thomas, state representative
- Mary Wolfe, state representative

Organizations

- American Federation of State, County and Municipal Employees Council 61
- Retail, Wholesale and Department Store Union Local 110

==== Results ====
Democratic primary results
Party	Candidate	Votes	%
Democratic	Jack Hatch	60,404	99.26
Democratic	Write-in	448	0.74
Total votes		60,852	100

== General election ==
=== Candidates ===
- Terry Branstad (Republican), incumbent governor

- Running mate: Kim Reynolds, incumbent lieutenant governor

- Jack Hatch (Democratic), state senator

- Running mate: Monica Vernon, Cedar Rapids city councilwoman

- Jim Hennager (New Independent Party), administrator, former city councillor and Reform Party nominee for governor in 1998

- Running mate: Mary Krieg

- Lee Hieb (Libertarian), orthopedic surgeon

- Running mate: Ryan Ketelsen, businessman

- Jonathan Narcisse (Iowa Party), former member of the Des Moines School Board and nominee for governor in 2010

- Running mate: Michael Richards, semi-retired businessman

=== Debates ===
- Complete video of debate, September 20, 2014 - C-SPAN

=== Predictions ===
Source	Ranking	As of
The Cook Political Report	Likely R	November 3, 2014
Sabato's Crystal Ball	Safe R	November 3, 2014
Rothenberg Political Report	Safe R	November 3, 2014
Real Clear Politics	Safe R	November 3, 2014

=== Polling ===
Poll source	Date(s) administered	Sample size	Margin of error	Terry Branstad (R)	Jack Hatch (D)	Other	Undecided
Public Policy Polling	November 1–3, 2014	1,265	± 2.8%	51%	40%	5%	5%
Public Policy Polling	November 1–3, 2014	1,265	± 2.8%	54%	43%	—	4%
Quinnipiac University	October 28–November 2, 2014	778	± 3.5%	52%	41%	2%	6%
Iowa Poll	October 28–31, 2014	701	± 3.7%	59%	35%	2%	4%
YouGov	October 25–31, 2014	1,112	± 4.4%	49%	35%	4%	13%
Fox News	October 28–30, 2014	911	± 3%	53%	36%	5%	6%
Reuters/Ipsos	October 23–29, 2014	1,129	± 3.3%	57%	34%	4%	5%
Quinnipiac	October 22–27, 2014	817	± 3.4%	56%	37%	2%	5%
Loras College	October 21–24, 2014	1,121	± 2.93%	55%	34%	2%	9%
CBS News/NYT/YouGov	October 16–23, 2014	2,322	± 3%	50%	37%	0%	13%
NBC News/Marist	October 18–22, 2014	772 LV	± 3.5%	59%	36%	2%	4%
NBC News/Marist	October 18–22, 2014	1,052 RV	± 3%	58%	34%	2%	6%
Gravis Marketing	October 20–21, 2014	964	± 3%	53%	43%	—	4%
Monmouth University	October 18–21, 2014	423	± 4.8%	58%	37%	3%	2%
Quinnipiac University	October 15–21, 2014	964	± 3.2%	55%	37%	2%	5%
Suffolk University	October 11–14, 2014	500	± 4.4%	54%	37%	3%	7%
Quinnipiac University	October 8–13, 2014	967	± 3.2%	54%	39%	1%	6%
The Iowa Poll	October 3–8, 2014	1,000	± 3.1%	54%	39%	—	4%
Magellan	October 3, 2014	1,299	± 2.8%	55%	39%	—	7%
NBC News/Marist	September 27–October 1, 2014	778 LV	± 3.5%	58%	36%	1%	5%
NBC News/Marist	September 27–October 1, 2014	1,093 RV	± 3%	58%	35%	1%	6%
CBS News/NYT/YouGov	September 20–October 1, 2014	2,359	± 2%	52%	39%	0%	9%
Gravis Marketing	September 29–30, 2014	522	± 4%	51%	43%	—	6%
Public Policy Polling	September 25–28, 2014	1,192	± 2.8%	50%	36%	4%	9%
Public Policy Polling	September 25–28, 2014	1,192	± 2.8%	52%	38%	—	10%
Iowa Poll	September 21–24, 2014	546	± 4.2%	48%	34%	6%	12%
Rasmussen Reports	September 17–18, 2014	750	± 4%	46%	40%	3%	10%
FOX News	September 14–16, 2014	600	± 4%	50%	37%	4%	8%
Quinnipiac	September 10–15, 2014	1,167	± 2.9%	60%	37%	1%	3%
Loras College	September 2–5, 2014	1,200	± 2.82%	56%	34%	—	11%
CBS News/NYT/YouGov	August 18–September 2, 2014	1,764	± 3%	51%	38%	1%	10%
Suffolk	August 23–26, 2014	500	± 4%	47%	35%	2%	16%
Public Policy Polling	August 22–24, 2014	915	± 3.2%	48%	35%	5%	12%
Public Policy Polling	August 22–24, 2014	915	± 3.2%	50%	37%	—	13%
Rasmussen Reports	August 11–12, 2014	750	± 4%	52%	35%	6%	7%
CBS News/NYT/YouGov	July 5–24, 2014	2,044	± 2.7%	51%	40%	1%	8%
Gravis Marketing	July 17–18, 2014	1,179	± 3%	50%	42%	—	9%
NBC News/Marist	July 7–13, 2014	1,599	± 2.5%	53%	38%	1%	9%
Quinnipiac	June 12–16, 2014	1,277	± 2.7%	47%	38%	1%	14%
Vox Populi Polling	June 4–5, 2014	665	± 3.8%	51%	40%	—	9%
Loras College	June 4–5, 2014	600	± 4%	52%	38%	—	11%
Rasmussen Reports	June 4–5, 2014	750	± 4%	49%	40%	2%	8%
Global Strategy Group	May 13–15, 2014	602	± 4%	47%	40%	—	13%
Public Policy Polling	May 15–19, 2014	914	± 3.3%	48%	40%	—	12%
Victory Enterprises	April 30–May 1, 2014	400	± 4.9%	48%	33%	—	20%
Hickman Analytics	April 24–30	500	± 4.4%	50%	40%	—	10%
Vox Populi Polling	April 22–24, 2014	600	± 4%	45%	43%	—	12%
Public Policy Polling	April 19–20, 2014	677	± 3.8%	43%	38%	—	19%
Suffolk University	April 3–8, 2014	800	± 3.5%	42%	32%	2%	24%
Quinnipiac	March 5–10, 2014	1,411	± 2.6%	46%	35%	1%	17%
Selzer & Co.	February 23–26, 2014	703	± 3.7%	44%	29%	—	27%
Public Policy Polling	February 20–23, 2014	869	± 3.3%	48%	36%	—	15%
Quinnipiac	December 10–15, 2013	1,617	± 2.4%	49%	33%	1%	17%
Selzer & Co.	December 8–11, 2013	325	± ?%	52%	29%	8%	11%
Public Policy Polling	July 5–7, 2013	668	± 3.8%	47%	35%	—	18%
Selzer & Co.	June 2–5, 2013	591	± 4%	55%	27%	9%	9%
Public Policy Polling	February 1–3, 2013	846	± %	48%	33%	—	19%

Hypothetical polling

With Branstad

Poll source	Date(s) administered	Sample size	Margin of error	Terry Branstad (R)	Bruce Braley (D)	Other	Undecided
Public Policy Polling	February 1–3, 2013	846	± %	47%	41%	—	11%
Public Policy Polling	May 3–6, 2012	1,181	± 2.85%	44%	40%	—	16%

Poll source	Date(s) administered	Sample size	Margin of error	Terry Branstad (R)	Chet Culver (D)	Other	Undecided
Public Policy Polling	July 5–7, 2013	668	± 3.8%	47%	42%	—	11%
Public Policy Polling	February 1–3, 2013	846	± %	50%	40%	—	10%
Public Policy Polling	May 3–6, 2012	1,181	± 2.85%	44%	42%	—	14%

Poll source	Date(s) administered	Sample size	Margin of error	Terry Branstad (R)	Michael Gronstal (D)	Other	Undecided
Public Policy Polling	July 5–7, 2013	668	± 3.8%	50%	36%	—	14%

Poll source	Date(s) administered	Sample size	Margin of error	Terry Branstad (R)	Bob Krause (D)	Other	Undecided
Quinnipiac	December 10–15, 2013	1,617	± 2.4%	49%	31%	1%	19%

Poll source	Date(s) administered	Sample size	Margin of error	Terry Branstad (R)	Dave Loebsack (D)	Other	Undecided
Public Policy Polling	February 1–3, 2013	846	± %	48%	38%	—	14%

Poll source	Date(s) administered	Sample size	Margin of error	Terry Branstad (R)	Tyler Olson (D)	Other	Undecided
Quinnipiac	December 10–15, 2013	1,617	± 2.4%	50%	32%	1%	17%
Selzer & Co.	December 8–11, 2013	325	± ?%	51%	28%	8%	13%
Public Policy Polling	July 5–7, 2013	668	± 3.8%	47%	33%	—	20%
Public Policy Polling	February 1–3, 2013	846	± %	47%	31%	—	22%

Poll source	Date(s) administered	Sample size	Margin of error	Terry Branstad (R)	Tom Vilsack (D)	Other	Undecided
Public Policy Polling	February 1–3, 2013	846	± %	47%	46%	—	8%
Public Policy Polling	May 3–6, 2012	1,181	± 2.85%	43%	46%	—	11%

With Hoefling

Poll source	Date(s) administered	Sample size	Margin of error	Tom Hoefling (R)	Jack Hatch (D)	Other	Undecided
Public Policy Polling	May 15–19, 2014	914	± 3.3%	30%	37%	—	33%
Suffolk University	April 3–8, 2014	800	± 3.5%	23%	35%	3%	39%
Public Policy Polling	February 20–23, 2014	869	± 3.3%	30%	34%	—	36%

With Reynolds

Poll source	Date(s) administered	Sample size	Margin of error	Kim Reynolds (R)	Chet Culver (D)	Other	Undecided
Public Policy Polling	July 5–7, 2013	668	± 3.8%	38%	42%	—	20%

Poll source	Date(s) administered	Sample size	Margin of error	Kim Reynolds (R)	Michael Gronstal (D)	Other	Undecided
Public Policy Polling	July 5–7, 2013	668	± 3.8%	37%	37%	—	26%

Poll source	Date(s) administered	Sample size	Margin of error	Kim Reynolds (R)	Jack Hatch (D)	Other	Undecided
Public Policy Polling	July 5–7, 2013	668	± 3.8%	36%	33%	—	30%

Poll source	Date(s) administered	Sample size	Margin of error	Kim Reynolds (R)	Tyler Olson (D)	Other	Undecided
Public Policy Polling	July 5–7, 2013	668	± 3.8%	36%	32%	—	32%

=== Results ===
2014 Iowa gubernatorial election
Party	Candidate	Votes	%	±%
Republican	Terry Branstad (incumbent) / Kim Reynolds (incumbent)	666,032	58.99%	+6.18%
Democratic	Jack Hatch / Monica Vernon	420,787	37.27%	−5.94%
Libertarian	Lee Deakins Hieb / Tim Watson	20,321	1.80%	+0.52%
New Independent Party Iowa	Jim Hennager / Mary Margaret Krieg	10,582	0.94%	N/A
Iowa	Jonathan R. Narcisse / Michael L. Richards	10,240	0.91%	−0.95%
n/a	Write-ins	1,095	0.09%	n/a
Total votes		1,129,057	100.00%	n/a
Republican hold				

==== Counties that flipped from Democratic to Republican ====
- Black Hawk (largest city: Waterloo)
- Des Moines (largest city: Burlington)
- Dubuque (largest city: Dubuque)
- Floyd (largest city: Charles City)
- Jefferson (largest city: Fairfield)
- Lee (largest city: Fort Madison)
- Linn (Largest city: Cedar Rapids)
- Story (Largest city: Ames)

==== By congressional district ====
Branstad won all four congressional districts, including one held by a Democrat.

District	Branstad	Hatch	Representative
1st	55.95%	40.98%	Rod Blum
2nd	56.66%	39.85%	Dave Loebsack
3rd	56.55%	38.79%	David Young
4th	67.25%	29.39%	Steve King
