= 2008 Iowa Senate election =

Iowa State Senate elections, 2008
- November 4, 2008

25 out of 50 seats in the Iowa State Senate 26 seats needed for a majority
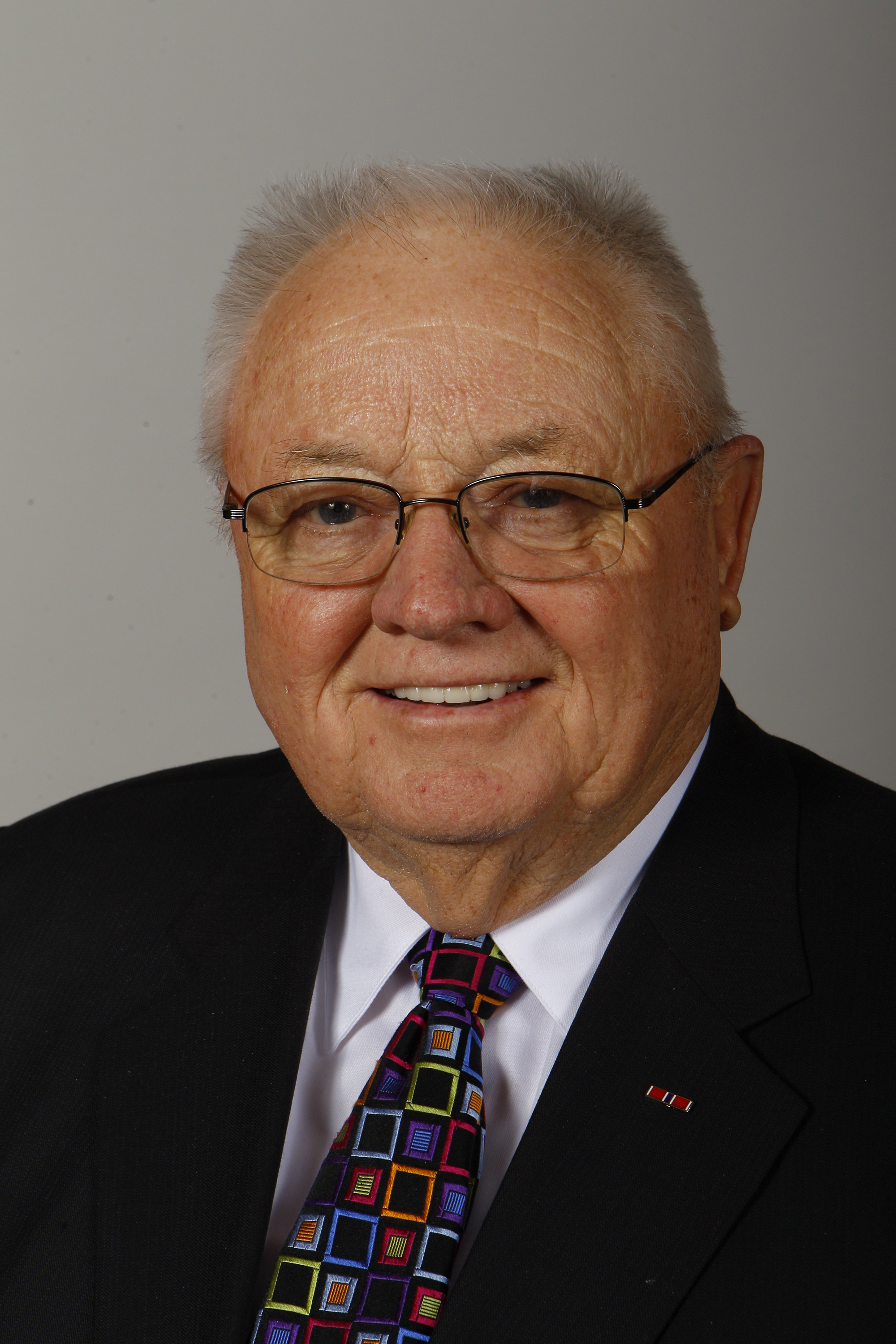

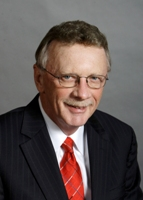
	Majority party	Minority party
Leader	Jack Kibbie	Ron Wieck
Party	Democratic	Republican
Leader's seat	4th	27th
Last election	30	20
Seats before	30	20
Seats after	32	18
Seat change	▲2	▼2
- Results of the elections: Democratic gain Republican gain Democratic hold Republican hold No election
President of the Senate before election
Jack Kibbie
Democratic
Elected President of the Senate
Jack Kibbie
Democratic

The 2008 Iowa Senate election were held on November 4, 2008. The Senate seats for the twenty-five even-numbered districts were up for election. Senate terms are staggered such that half the membership is elected every two years, with each Senators serving a four-year term. Prior to the election, the Democrats were in the majority - marking the first time in 42 years that the Democrats had controlled both branches of the Iowa General Assembly and the Governor's Office. They expanded this majority by two seats in the 2008 elections.

== Predictions ==
Source	Ranking	As of
Stateline	Likely D	October 15, 2008

== Overview ==
Iowa Senate: pre-election	Seats
Democratic-held	30
Republican-held	20
Total	50

2006 Elections
Democratic held and uncontested	19
Contested	20
Republican held and uncontested	11
Total	50

Iowa Senate: post-election	Seats
Democratic-held	32
Republican-held	18
Total	50

from the Iowa Secretary of State.

== General election ==
District	Party	Incumbent	Status	Party	Candidate	Votes	%
2	Republican	Dave Mulder		Republican	Randy Feenstra	24,595	
4	Democratic	John P. Kibbie	Won re-election.	Democratic	John P. Kibbie	18,059	
4	Democratic	John P. Kibbie	Won re-election.	Grassroots For Life	Ken Vaske	7,258	
6	Republican	E. Thurman Gaskill		Republican	Merlin Bartz	14,299	
6	Republican	E. Thurman Gaskill		Democratic	Doug Thompson	12,496	
6	Republican	E. Thurman Gaskill		Independent	Kenneth J. Abrams	2,241	
8	Republican	Mark Zieman	Lost re-election.	Democratic	Mary Jo Wilhelm	14,862	
8	Republican	Mark Zieman	Lost re-election.	Republican	Mark Zieman	13,836	
10	Democratic	Jeff Danielson	Won Re-election.	Democratic	Jeff Danielson	16,103	
10	Democratic	Jeff Danielson	Won Re-election.	Republican	Walt Rogers	16,081	
12	Democratic	Brian Schoenjahn	Won re-election.	Democratic	Brian Schoenjahn	17,402	
12	Democratic	Brian Schoenjahn	Won re-election.	Republican	Rebecca Wearmouth	9,641	
14	Democratic	Michael Connolly		Democratic	Pam Jochum	19,443	
14	Democratic	Michael Connolly		Republican	John Hulsizer, Jr.	8,428	
16	Democratic	Tom Hancock	Won re-election.	Democratic	Tom Hancock	17,129	
16	Democratic	Tom Hancock	Won re-election.	Republican	Dave McLaughlin	13,660	
18	Republican	Mary Lundby		Democratic	Swati A. Dandekar	20,667	
18	Republican	Mary Lundby		Republican	Joe Childers	17,367	
20	Republican	John Putney		Republican	Tim L. Kapucian	15,527	
20	Republican	John Putney		Democratic	Randy L. Braden	13,916	
22	Republican	Larry McKibben		Democratic	Steve Sodders	14,837	
22	Republican	Larry McKibben		Republican	Jarret P. Heil	11,846	
24	Republican	Jerry Behn	Won re-election.	Republican	Jerry Behn	22,970	
24	Republican	Jerry Behn	Won re-election.	Democratic	Albert Sorensen	16,233	
26	Republican	Steve Kettering	Won re-election.	Republican	Steve Kettering	22,853	
28	Republican	James A. Seymour	Won re-election.	Republican	James A. Seymour	17,188	
30	Republican	Pat Ward	Won re-election.	Republican	Pat Ward	21,842	
32	Republican	Brad Zaun	Won re-election.	Republican	Brad Zaun	23,190	
34	Democratic	Dick L. Dearden	Won re-election.	Democratic	Dick L. Dearden	17,705	
34	Democratic	Dick L. Dearden	Won re-election.	Republican	Scott Strosahl	9,617	
36	Republican	Paul McKinley	Won re-election.	Republican	Paul McKinley	18,236	
36	Republican	Paul McKinley	Won re-election.	Democratic	Deb Ballalatak	10,579	
38	Democratic	Thomas J. Rielly	Won re-election.	Democratic	Thomas J. Rielly	16,332	
38	Democratic	Thomas J. Rielly	Won re-election.	Republican	Michael C. Hadley	12,393	
40	Republican	James F. Hahn	Won re-election.	Republican	James F. Hahn	14,134	
40	Republican	James F. Hahn	Won re-election.	Democratic	Sharon Savage	12,939	
42	Democratic	Frank B. Wood	Lost re-election.	Republican	Shawn Hamerlinck	16,447	
42	Democratic	Frank B. Wood	Lost re-election.	Democratic	Frank B. Wood	16,063	
44	Democratic	Thomas G. Courtney	Won re-election.	Democratic	Thomas G. Courtney	15,601	
44	Democratic	Thomas G. Courtney	Won re-election.	Republican	David Kerr	10,536	
46	Democratic	Eugene Fraise	Won re-election.	Democratic	Eugene Fraise	14,668	
46	Democratic	Eugene Fraise	Won re-election.	Republican	Doug P. Abolt	11,088	
48	Republican	Jeff Angelo		Republican	Kim Reynolds	14,274	
48	Republican	Jeff Angelo		Democratic	Ruth Smith	11,653	
48	Republican	Jeff Angelo		Independent	Rodney Schmidt	1,021	
50	Democratic	Michael E. Gronstal	Won re-election.	Democratic	Michael E. Gronstal	13,375	
50	Democratic	Michael E. Gronstal	Won re-election.	Republican	Mark A. Brandenburg	9,740	

== See also ==
- United States House of Representatives elections in Iowa, 2008
- Iowa Senate
- Iowa House of Representatives
- Iowa House of Representatives elections, 2008
- Iowa General Assembly
- Political party strength in U.S. states
