= Tom Hancock =

American politician

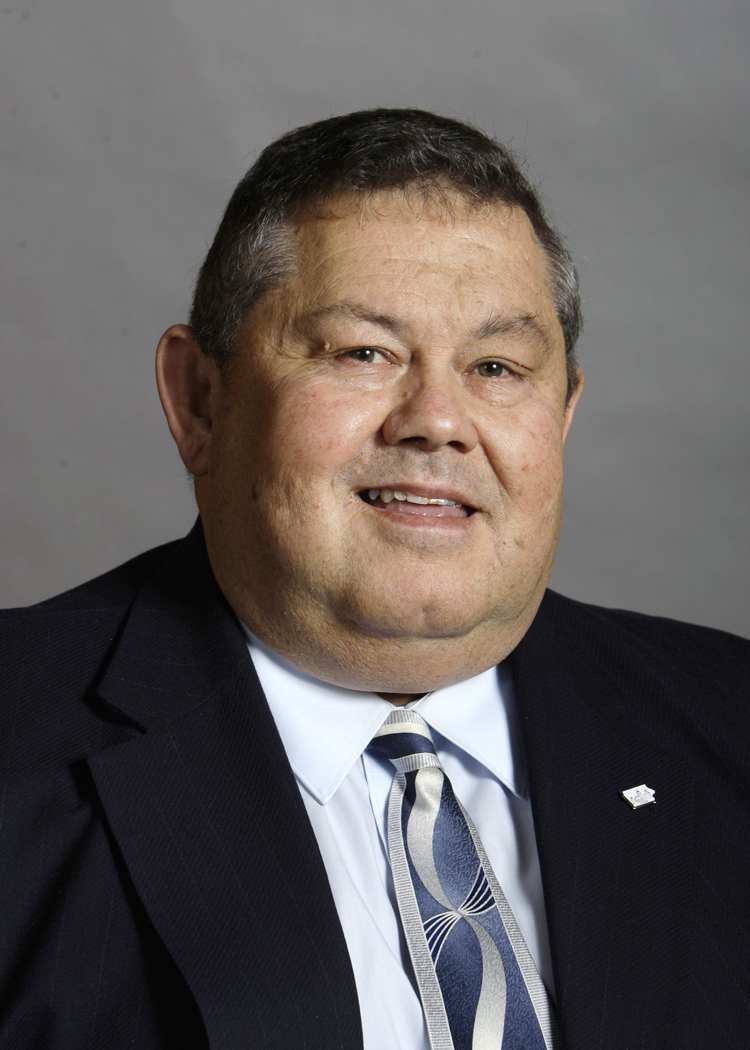
- Hancock in January 2009

Member of the Iowa Senate from the 16th district
- In office January 10, 2005 – January 13, 2013
- Preceded by: Julie Hosch
- Succeeded by: Dick Dearden

Personal details
- Born: February 3, 1948 Dubuque, Iowa, U.S.
- Died: January 31, 2016 (aged 67) Dubuque, Iowa, U.S.
- Party: Democrat
- Spouse: Coleen
- Children: 1 child
- Occupation: United States Postal Service, retired

Thomas L. Hancock (February 3, 1948 – January 31, 2016) was an American politician who was Iowa State Senator from the 16th District. A Democrat, he served in the Iowa Senate from 2005. He retired from the United States Postal Service after 31 years and was a member of the Epworth Volunteer Fire Department.

Hancock served on several committees in the Iowa Senate: the Agriculture committee; the Appropriations committee; the Environment and Energy Independence committee; the Judiciary committee; the Transportation committee; and the Natural Resources committee, where he was vice chair. He also served as chair of the Justice System Appropriations Subcommittee.

Hancock was last re-elected in 2008 with 17,129 votes, defeating Republican opponent Dave McLaughlin. He died of an apparent heart attack on January 31, 2016, in Dubuque.

Iowa Senate
Preceded by Julie Hosch	16th District; 2005–2013	Succeeded by Dick Dearden
