= Senator Danielson =

Senator Danielson may refer to:

- George E. Danielson (1915–1998), California State Senate
- Jeff Danielson (born 1970), Iowa State Senate
- Jessie Danielson (fl. 2010s), Colorado State Senate
