= Senator Zieman =

Senator Zieman may refer to:

- Lyle Zieman (1921–2003), Iowa State Senate
- Mark Zieman (1945–2019), Iowa State Senate
