= Hamerlinck =

Hamerlinck or Haemerlinck is a Flemish surname. Notable people with the surname include:

- Alfred Haemerlinck (1905–1993), Belgian road bicycle racer
- Shawn Hamerlinck (born 1980), American politician
