= Mike Pike =

American politician in Iowa (born 1976)

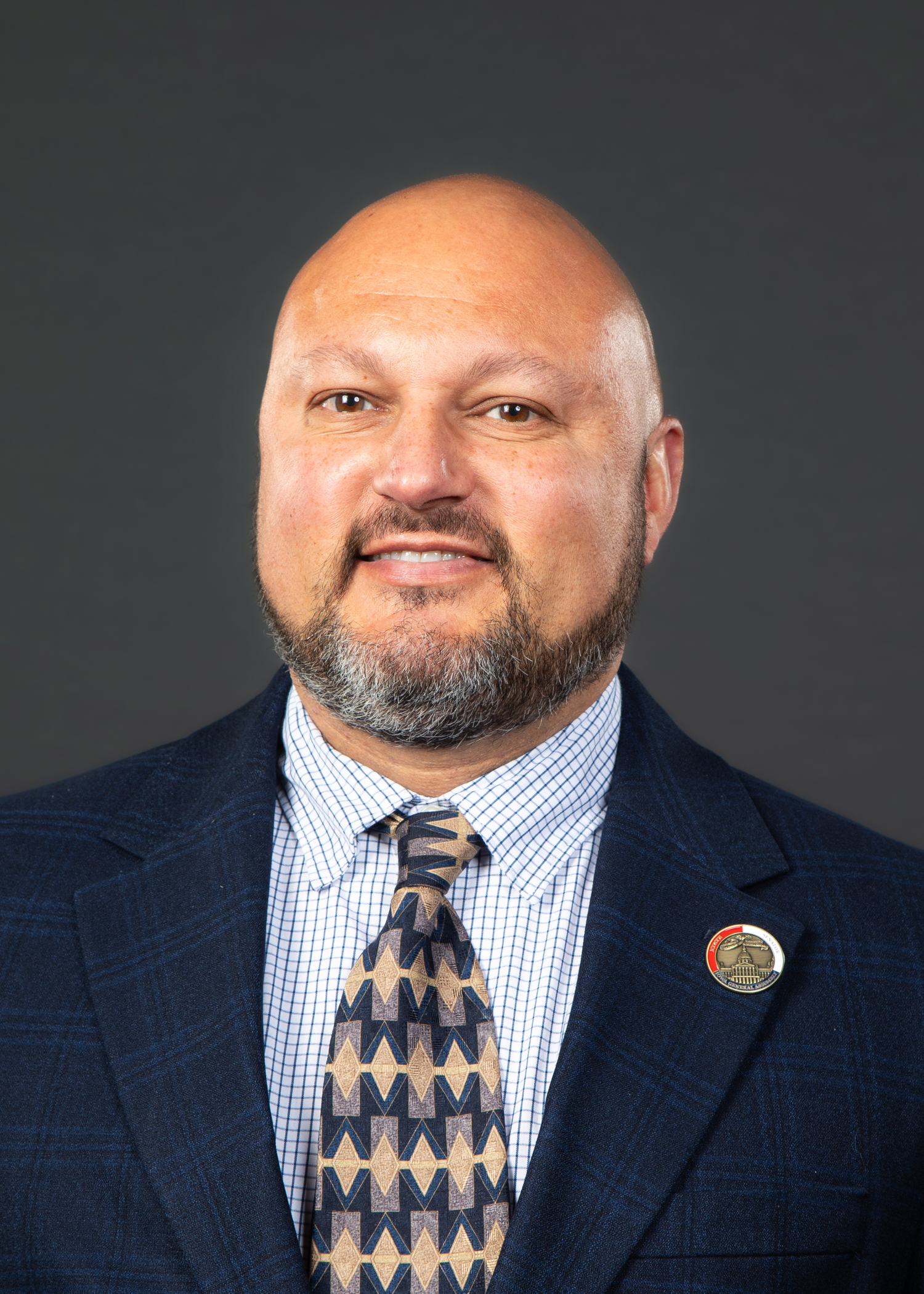

Member of the Iowa Senate from the 20th district
- Incumbent
- Assumed office January 13, 2025
- Preceded by: Nate Boulton

Personal details
- Born: 1976
- Party: Republican
- Website: Official website

Mike Pike (born c. 1976) is an American politician from Iowa. Pike, a plumber, ran in the 2024 Iowa Senate election as a Republican, and unseated Democratic incumbent Nate Boulton of District 20.
