= Nate Boulton =

American politician

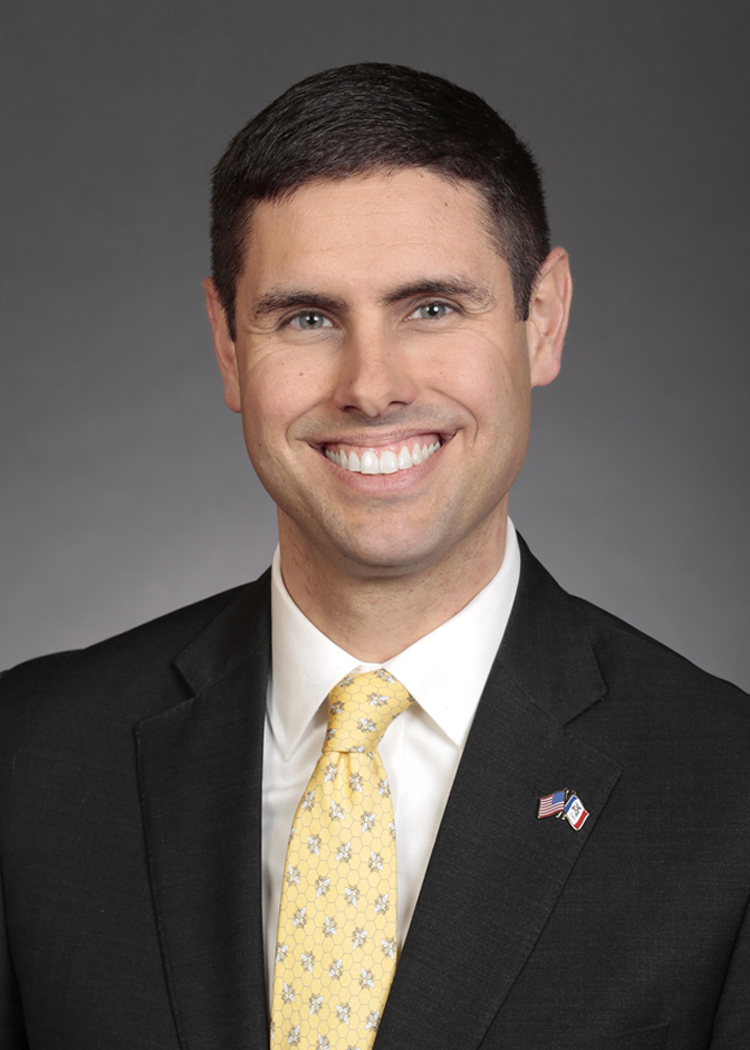

Member of the Iowa Senate
- In office January 9, 2017 – January 12, 2025
- Preceded by: Dick Dearden
- Succeeded by: Mike Pike
- Constituency: District 16 (2017–2023); District 20 (2023–2025)

Personal details
- Born: May 23, 1980 (age 46) Washington, Iowa, U.S.
- Party: Democratic
- Education: Simpson College (BA); Drake University (MPA, JD)
- Website: Senate website

Nate Boulton (born May 23, 1980) is an American politician who served in the Iowa Senate from 2017 to 2025. Boulton, a Democrat, represented the 20th and 16th districts. Boulton was first elected in 2016 to replace retiring Democratic Senator Dick Dearden.

In May 2017, Boulton announced his candidacy for the Iowa gubernatorial election, 2018 with a video on Twitter. He suspended his campaign in May 2018 shortly after The Des Moines Register published the accounts of three women accusing Boulton of sexual misconduct.

== Early life and education ==
Boulton was born in Washington, Iowa, and grew up in Columbus Junction, Iowa.

He earned his J.D. degree from Drake Law School in 2005 and was admitted to the Iowa bar that year. He also holds a Master’s of Public Administration from Drake University and a Bachelor’s in history and political science from Simpson College. He has served on the Simpson College Alumni Board and as an adjunct professor at Simpson.

== Career ==
Outside the legislature, Boulton is a partner with Hedberg & Boulton, where he practices in workers compensation, personal injury and labor law. He has served as vice-president of the Iowa Association for Justice and as president of the Iowa Workers' Compensation Advisory Committee. He also acts as a grader for the Iowa Bar Exam. He has taught courses in labor law at Drake Law School, sports law and business law at Simpson College, and organizational management and moral leadership at William Penn University.

=== State senate ===
Boulton was elected to his first term in the Iowa Senate in 2016. He represented the people of Senate District 16 on the Northeast side of Des Moines and in Pleasant Hill until 2023. In 2023, he was redistricted to District 20.

He was ranking member on the Labor & Business Relations Committee, then ranking member of the Judiciary Committee and Administrative Rules Committee. He also served as the Senate Minority Whip in 2024. Other committee work included appropriations, commerce, natural resources, local government, and international relations.

=== Gubernatorial campaign (2017–2018) ===
On May 4, 2017, Boulton announced his candidacy for Governor of Iowa. His platform includes fighting for workers' rights, as he was an outspoken opponent of the collective bargaining bill that was passed by the Republican led Iowa Legislature. He also voiced strong support for public education in Iowa. Former Presidential Candidate Martin O'Malley lauded Boulton's announcement, writing on Twitter, "The future is now. Congratulations @NateBoulton on entering the race for #IAGov #iapolitics".

Boulton suspended his campaign in May 2018 after The Des Moines Register published the accounts of three women accusing Boulton of sexual misconduct. The allegations against Boulton included non-consensual groping and frotteurism.

== Electoral history ==
Election	Political result	Candidate	Party	Votes	%
Iowa State Senate primary elections, 2016; District 16; Turnout: 3,054	Democratic	Nate Boulton	Democratic	1,614	52.85%
Iowa State Senate primary elections, 2016; District 16; Turnout: 3,054	Democratic	Pam Dearden Conner	Democratic	1,438	47.09%
Iowa State Senate primary elections, 2016; District 16; Turnout: 3,054	Democratic	Write-ins	Democratic	2	0.07%
Iowa State Senate elections, 2016; District 16; Turnout: 23,485	Democratic hold	Nate Boulton	Democratic	14,046	59.81%
Iowa State Senate elections, 2016; District 16; Turnout: 23,485	Democratic hold	Mike Pryor	Republican	8,114	34.55%
Iowa State Senate elections, 2016; District 16; Turnout: 23,485	Democratic hold	Christopher Whiteing	Libertarian	1,254	5.34%
Iowa State Senate elections, 2016; District 16; Turnout: 23,485	Democratic hold	Write-ins		71	0.30%

Iowa Senate
Preceded by Brad Zaun	20th District; 2023 – 2025	Succeeded by Mike Pike
Preceded by Dick Dearden	16th District; 2017 – 2023	Succeeded by Claire Celsi
