= Mary Jo Wilhelm =

American politician

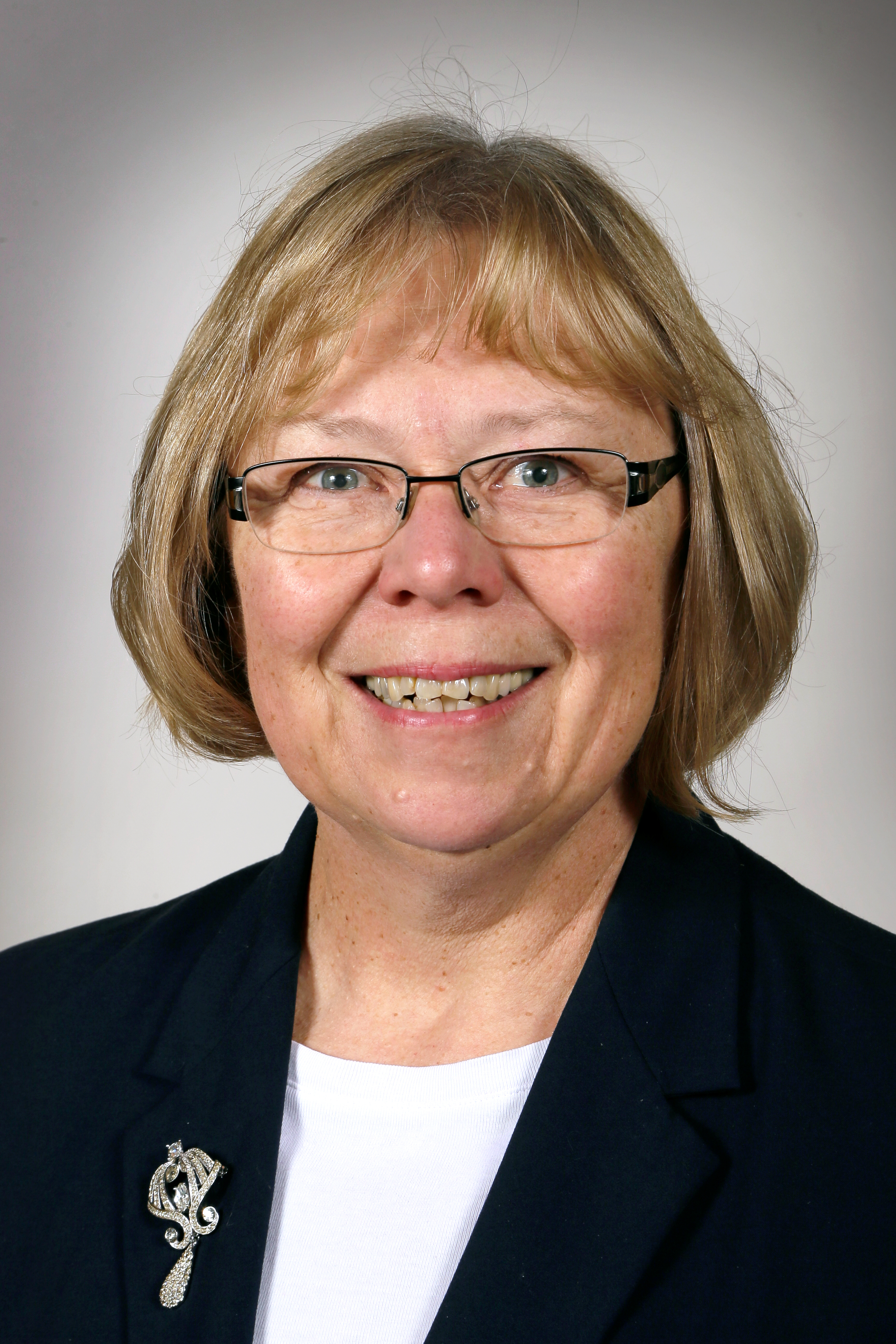

Member of the Iowa Senate from the 26th district
- In office January 12, 2009 – January 8, 2017
- Preceded by: Mark Zieman
- Succeeded by: Waylon Brown

Personal details
- Born: 1955 (age 70–71) Cresco, Iowa, U.S.
- Party: Democratic
- Spouse: Michael
- Children: 2
- Occupation: Appraiser
- Website: Wilhelm's website

Mary Jo Wilhelm (born 1955) is a former Iowa state senator who represented the 26th District. A Democrat, she served in the Iowa Senate from 2009 to 2017. She has been a Certified Residential Appraiser since 2000, and is the founder and owner of Wilhelm Appraisers.

Wilhelm served on several committees in the Iowa Senate: the Economic Growth committee; the Education committee; the Environment & Energy Independence committee; the Human Resources committee; and the Ways and Means committee. She also served on the Agriculture and Natural Resources Appropriations Subcommittee. Her previous political experience included serving on the Howard County Board of Supervisors.

Wilhelm was elected in 2008 with 14,862 votes, defeating Republican incumbent Mark Zieman.

Iowa Senate
Preceded by Mark Zieman	8th District; 2009 – 2017	Succeeded by Waylon Brown
