= Iowa's 20th Senate district =

American legislative district

Iowa's 20th State Senate district
Senator
Mike Pike; R

The 20th District of the Iowa Senate is located in central Iowa, and is currently composed of part of Polk County.

== Current elected officials ==
Mike Pike is the senator currently representing the 20th District.

The area of the 20th District contains two Iowa House of Representatives districts:

- The 39th District (represented by Rick L. Olson)
- The 40th District (represented by Bill Gustoff)

The district is also located in Iowa's 3rd congressional district, which is represented by Zach Nunn.

== List of representatives ==
Representative	Party	Dates	Residence	Notes
Andrew Young Hull	Democrat	1852–1853	Polk County, Iowa	
Theophilus Bryan	Democrat	1854–1856	Guthrie County, Iowa	Senator Bryan died in office in 1856
James Cunningham Jordan	Whig	1854–1855	Polk County, Iowa	
Samuel Jordan Kirkwood	Republican	1856–1859	Iowa City, Iowa	
George M. Davis	Republican	1860–1861	Lyons, Iowa	
Norman Boardman	Republican	1862–1863	Lyons, Iowa	
Philo Gould Camp Merrill	Republican	1864–1865	Grinnell, Iowa	
William McMarshman	Republican	1866–1867	Warren County, Iowa	
George E. Griffith	Republican	1868–1871	Indianola, Iowa	
Mark Antony Dashiell	Republican	1872–1875	Hartford, Iowa	
William Graham	Republican	1876–1877	Indianola, Iowa	
Thomas Hanna	Republican	1878–1881	Muscatine, Iowa	
Pliny Nichols	Republican	1882–1885	Muscatine County, Iowa	
Samuel Tyler Chesebro	Democrat	1886–1889	Muscatine County, Iowa	
John M. Gobble	Democrat	1890–1893	Muscatine, Iowa	
Charles Albert Carpenter	Republican	1894–1897	Columbus Junction, Iowa	
George Marion Titus	Republican	1898–1901	Muscatine, Iowa	
Fred M. Molsberry	Republican	1902–1906	Columbus Junction, Iowa	
Jay Ira Nichols	Republican	1907–1910	West Liberty, Iowa	
Alexander Middleton Garrett	Democrat	1911–1914	Louisa County, Iowa	
Frederick William Eversmeyer	Republican	1915–1918	Muscatine, Iowa	
Jonas DeMoss Buser	Republican	1919–1926	Muscatine County, Iowa	
Samuel Franklin Wilson	Republican	1927	Morning Sun, Iowa	Senator Wilson died before assuming office in 1927.
Edwin Hicklin	Republican	1931–1934	Wapello, Iowa	
Elmer Primer Corwin	Republican	1935–1942	Muscatine County, Iowa	
Floyd J. Pine	Republican	1943–1946	Louisa County, Iowa	
Herman B. Lord	Republican	1947–1954	Muscatine, Iowa	
George W. Weber	Republican	1955–1962	Columbus Junction, Iowa	
John M. Ely	Democratic	1963–1964	Cedar Rapids, Iowa	
Tom Riley	Republican	1965–1966	Cedar Rapids, Iowa	
William F. Denman	Democratic	1967–1970	Des Moines, Iowa	In 1964, after previous amendments to the Iowa Constitution were determined to violate the 14th Amendment, an interim plan increased the number of senators and representatives in the state by apportioning additional senators and representatives to the most populous districts/counties. This plan existed from 1965 to 1970, when a new districting and apportionment plan was adopted.
Lee H. Guadineer	Democratic	1967–1970	Des Moines, Iowa	
George E. O'Malley	Democratic	1967–1970	Des Moines, Iowa	
William J. Reichardt	Democratic	1967–1970	Des Moines, Iowa	
Howard C. Reppert	Democratic	1967–1970	Des Moines, Iowa	
Willa Charlene Conklin	Republican	1971–1972	Waterloo, Iowa	
Elizabeth Ruby Miller	Republican	1973–1980	Marshall County, Iowa	
Michael R. Lura	Republican	1981–1982	Marshall County, Iowa	
Edgar H. Holden	Republican	1983–1988	Scott County, Iowa	
Maggie Tinsman	Republican	1989–1992	Scott County, Iowa	
Jack Rife	Republican	1993–2000	Cedar County, Iowa	
Thomas L. Fiegen	Democratic	2001–2002	Clarence, Iowa	
John Putney	Republican	2003–2008	Gladbrook, Iowa	
Tim L. Kapucian	Republican	2009–2012	Keystone, Iowa	
Brad Zaun	Republican	2013–2022	Urbandale, Iowa	
Nate Boulton	Democratic	2023–2024	Des Moines, Iowa	
Mike Pike	Republican	2025–Present	Des Moines, Iowa	

== Historical district boundaries ==
Map	Description	Years effective	Notes
	Boone County Bancroft County; Calhoun County (named Fox County at the time); Cerro Gordo County; Dallas County; Emmet County; Franklin County; Greene County; Guthrie County; Hancock County; Hamilton County (named Risley County at the time); Hardin County; Humboldt County; Jasper County; Kossuth County; Marshall County; Palo Alto County; Pocahontas County; Polk County; Story County; Webster County (named Yell County at the time); Winnebago County; Worth County; Wright County	1852–1855	From 1846 to 1857, district numbering was not utilized by the Iowa State Legislature. This convention was added with the passing of the 1857 Iowa Constitution. Numbering of districts pre-1857 is done as a matter of historic convenience.
	Iowa County Johnson County	1856–1859	
	Clinton County	1860–1863	
	Warren County	1864–1877	
	Muscatine County	1878–1887	
	Louisa County; Muscatine County	1888–1962	
	Linn County	1963–1966	
	Polk County	1967–1970	
	Black Hawk County (partial)	1971–1972	
	Grundy County (partial) Hardin County (partial); Jasper County (partial); Marshall County (partial); Story County (partial)	1973–1982	
	Scott County (partial)	1983–1992	
	Cedar County Clinton County (partial); Jones County (partial); Scott County (partial)	1993–2002	
	Benton County Grundy County; Iowa County (partial): Honey Creek Township; Marengo Township; Washington Township; Marengo; Tama County: Excluding; Columbia Township; Richland Township; Salt Creek Township; Chelsea	2003–2012	
	Polk County (partial): Jefferson Township; Grimes; Johnston; Urbandale	2013–2022	
	Polk County (partial): Altoona; Des Moines (partial); North East part of the city; Pleasant Hill	2023–present	

== See also ==
- Iowa General Assembly
- Iowa Senate
