= E. Thurman Gaskill =

American politician (1935–2023)

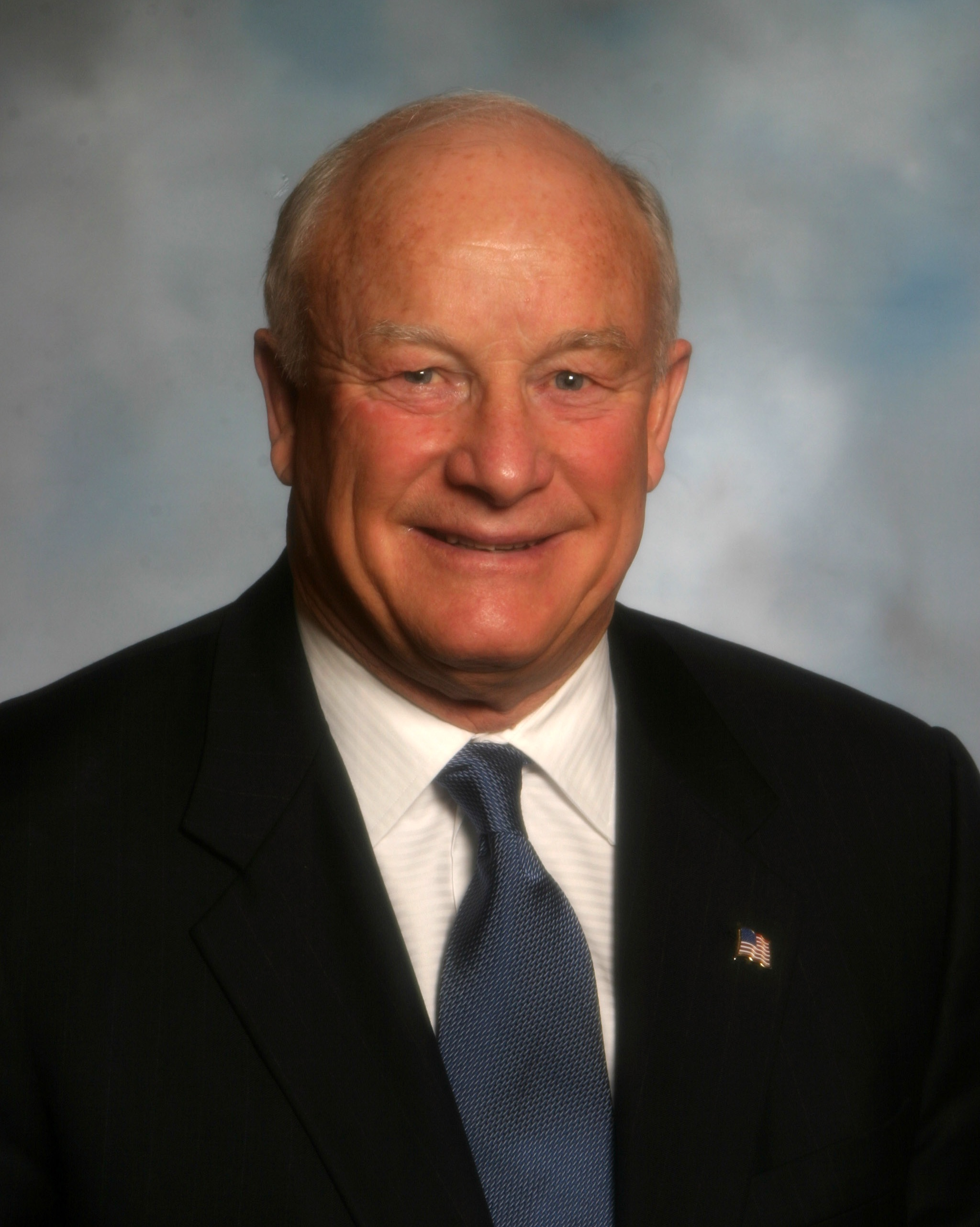

Member of the Iowa Senate
- In office January 13, 1997 – January 12, 2009
- Preceded by: James Edward Black
- Succeeded by: Merlin Bartz
- Constituency: 8th district (1997–2003); 6th district (2003–2009)

Personal details
- Born: Elwyn Thurman Gaskill; April 4, 1935 Algona, Iowa, U.S.
- Died: March 7, 2023 (aged 87) Algona, Iowa, U.S.
- Party: Republican
- Spouse: Geraldine Adkins (m. 1958)
- Children: 4
- Education: Iowa State University
- Occupation: Farmer; politician

Military service
- Branch/service: U.S. Army
- Years of service: 1954–1956

Elwyn Thurman Gaskill (April 4, 1935 – March 7, 2023) was an American politician who was a member of the Iowa Senate from 1997 to 2009. A member of the Republican Party, he first represented Iowa's 8th Senate district from 1997 to 2003, then represented the 6th district from 2003 to 2009. He was the majority leader of the Iowa Senate for six years. Gaskill was a director of Meta Financial Group, Incorporated, from 1982 to 2014. He was a commissioner of the Iowa Development Commission and the Iowa Department of Natural Resources, president of the Iowa Corn Growers Association, president of the National Corn Growers Association, chairman of the United States Feed Grains Council, and held other agricultural positions.

== Early life and education ==
Elwyn Thurman Gaskill was born on April 4, 1935, in Algona, Iowa, and was the son of George Elwyn and Mildred Genevieve (née Chapman) Gaskill. He graduated from Corwith Consolidated High School in 1953 and attended Iowa State University, where he met his wife.

== Career ==
He served in the United States Army from 1954 to 1956 and was stationed in West Germany.

Gaskill began farming in 1958 on rented property and expanded over the years, purchasing his own land. He was inducted into the Iowa State University Agricultural Hall of Fame in the spring of 1975.

He was appointed to the Iowa Development Commission by governor Robert Ray and was the vice chair of its Agriculture Promotion Board. He was appointed to the board of the National Corn Growers Association and later became its president. He was the first chairman of the Iowa Corn Promotion Board. He was the chairman of the U.S. Feed Grains Council in 1981.

He was a director of Meta Financial Group, Incorporated, a bank holding company, from 1982 to 2014.

Gaskill was on the Hancock County Board of Education. In 1989, he was appointed to the board of the Iowa Department of Natural Resources.

Gaskill succeeded James Edward Black to represent Iowa's 8th Senate district after Black resigned during the 77th Iowa General Assembly.

Gaskill was reelected in 2004 with 17,192 votes (58%), defeating John Drury, the Democratic party nominee. He did not seek reelection to the Iowa Senate in the 2008 election.

During his last term, Gaskill served on several committees in the Iowa Senate, the agriculture committee; the appropriations committee; the state government committee; and the natural resources and environment committee, where he was the ranking member. He was the ranking member of the agriculture and natural resources appropriations subcommittee.

He supported Rudy Giuliani in the 2008 Republican party presidential primary campaign as the Iowa chairman of Farmers for Rudy, and as a national co-chairman.

In 2009, Wallaces Farmer honored Gaskill and his wife Gerry, along with three other families, as "Iowa Master Farmers".

== Death ==
Gaskill died at the Kossuth Regional Health Center in Algona, Iowa, on March 7, 2023.

== Personal life ==
He married Geraldine "Gerry" Adkins in Grinnell, Iowa, on June 8, 1958. They had four children, one of whom, James Scott Gaskill, died as an infant. Gaskill attended the Corwith United Methodist Church.

Iowa Senate
Preceded by James Edward Black	Iowa State Senator from the 8th district 1997–2003	Succeeded by Mark Zieman
Preceded by Steve King	Iowa State Senator from the 6th district 2003–2009	Succeeded by Merlin Bartz
