= Doug Campbell (Iowa politician) =

American politician

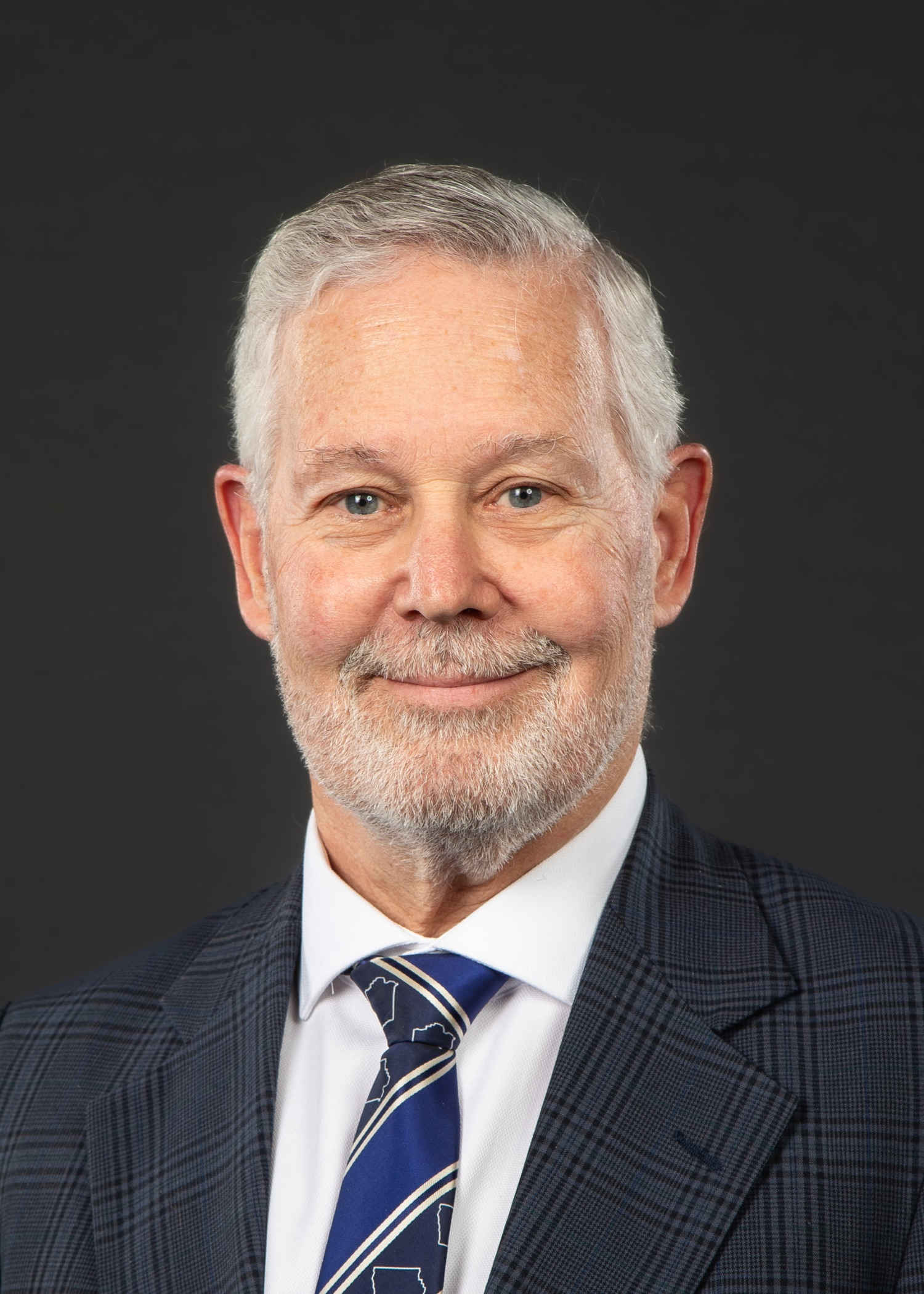

Member of the Iowa Senate from the 30th district
- Incumbent
- Assumed office January 2, 2025
- Preceded by: Waylon Brown

Personal details
- Born: October 17, 1954 (age 71) Des Moines, Iowa
- Party: Republican
- Education: Drake University (BPharm)
- Profession: Retired pharmacist

Douglass Campbell is an American politician. He was elected to the Iowa Senate in the 2024 Iowa Senate election.

Campbell is a retired pharmacist and former Mason City School Board member.
