= Waylon Brown =

American politician

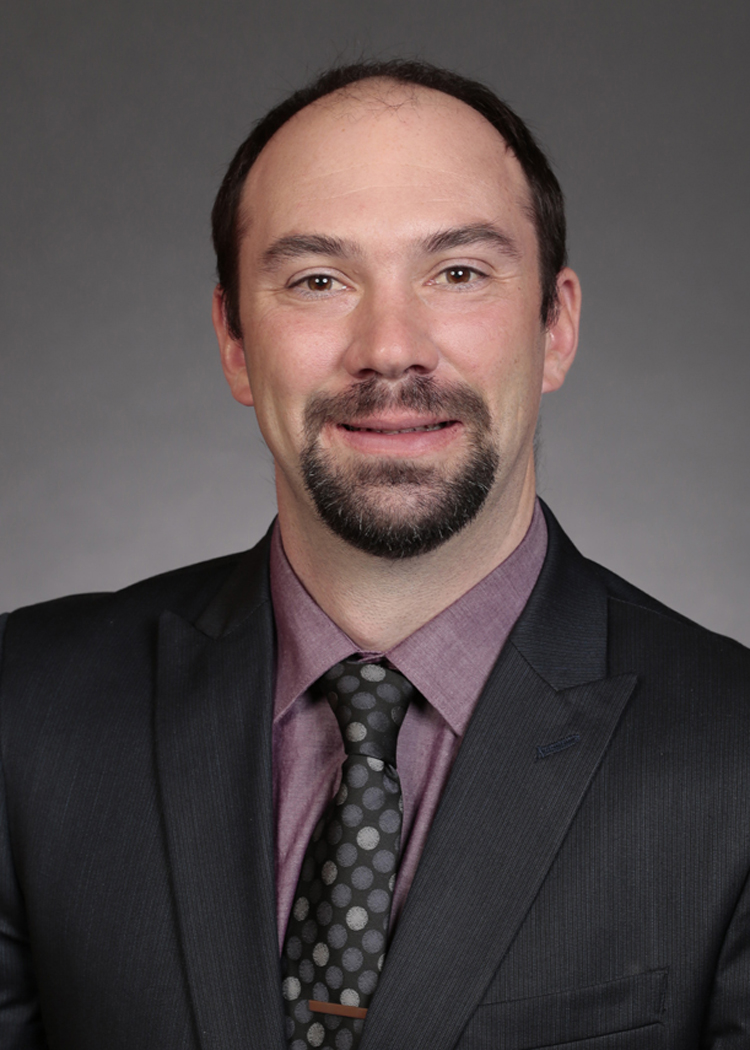

Member of the Iowa Senate from the 30th district
- In office January 14, 2017 – July 10, 2024
- Preceded by: Mary Jo Wilhelm
- Succeeded by: Doug Campbell
- Constituency: District 30 - (2023-2024); District 26 - (2017-2023)

Personal details
- Born: July 13, 1979 (age 47) St. Ansgar, Iowa, U.S.
- Party: Republican
- Spouse: Julie
- Children: 2
- Occupation: Farmer

Waylon Brown (born July 13, 1979) is a former state senator from Iowa's 30th District. A Republican, he was elected to the Iowa Senate in 2016. Brown is a farmer and a small businessman who owns a construction company, also serving as vice president of the Mitchell County, Iowa Farm Bureau Board. He resides in St. Ansgar, Iowa, with his wife Julie and two children. In July 2024, Brown announced he would resign his seat in the Iowa Senate effective July 10, 2024.

As of February 2020, Brown served on the following committees: Transportation (Vice Chair), Agriculture, Commerce, Labor and Business Relations, and Ways and Means. He also served on the Studies Committee, as well as the Administrative Rules Review Committee (vice chair), Fuel Distribution Percentage Formula Review Committee, State Government Efficiency Review Committee, Nonresident Deer Hunting License Committee, Nonresident Wild Turkey Hunting License Committee, and the Statewide Fire and Police Retirement System Board of Trustees.

== Electoral history ==
Iowa Senate 26th District election, 2016
Party	Candidate	Votes	%
Republican	Waylon Brown	19,165	62.38%
Democratic	Mary Jo Wilhelm	11,557	37.62%
Republican gain from Democratic			

Iowa Senate
Preceded by Eric Giddens	30th District; 2023–2024	Succeeded by Doug Campbell
Preceded by Mary Jo Wilhelm	26th District; 2017–2023	Succeeded by Jeff Edler
