= Frank Wood (Iowa politician) =

American politician (born 1951)

Frank B. Wood
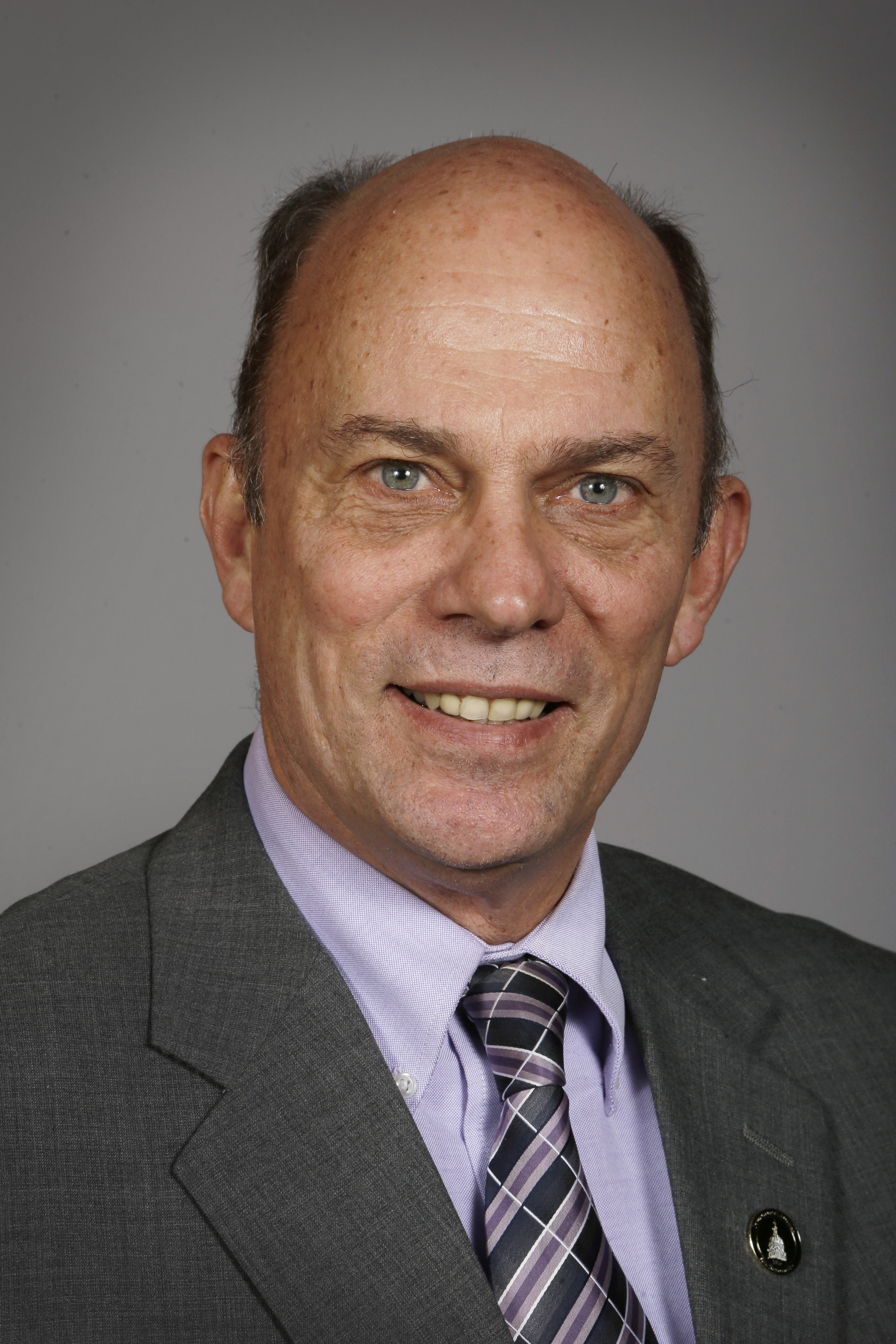

Member of the Iowa Senate from the 42nd district
- In office January 10, 2005 – 2008
- Preceded by: Bryan Sievers
- Succeeded by: Shawn Hamerlinck

Personal details
- Born: 1951 (age 74–75) Rock Island, Illinois, U.S.
- Party: Democrat
- Occupation: High School Associate Principal

Frank B. Wood (born 1951) is an American politician and educator from Eldridge, Iowa, who served as a state legislator in the Iowa Senate from 2005 to 2009, and the Iowa House of Representatives from 2014 to 2015.

== Background ==
Born in Rock Island, Illinois, Wood received his bachelor's degree from Augustana College and his master's degree from Western Illinois University. Wood began working as a physical education teacher and coach at North Scott High School in 1973, and became activities director a year later. After earning his master's degree in education and educational leadership in administration from Western Illinois University, Wood became a principal at Riverdale High School, Port Byron, Illinois, in 1987, and later assistant principal at Rock Island High School. He returned to North Scott High School in 1999, when he was hired as assistant principal; during this time, he also assumed his old duties as activities director.

Wood served as mayor of Eldridge from 2002 until his election to the Iowa Senate in 2004. Wood was elected in 2004 with 15,500 votes (51%), defeating Republican opponent Bryan J. Sievers. He was an unsuccessful candidate for re-election in the Iowa Senate elections, 2008.

In 2012, Wood co-authored a book along with Dave Mulder, titled an Education in Politics: Four Years in the Iowa State Senate 2004–2008.

Wood served in the Iowa House of Representatives from January 2013 to January 2015 and was a Democrat.

Iowa Senate
Preceded by Bryan Sievers	42nd District; 2005 – 2008	Succeeded by Shawn Hamerlinck
