= Tom Rielly =

American politician

Thomas J. Rielly
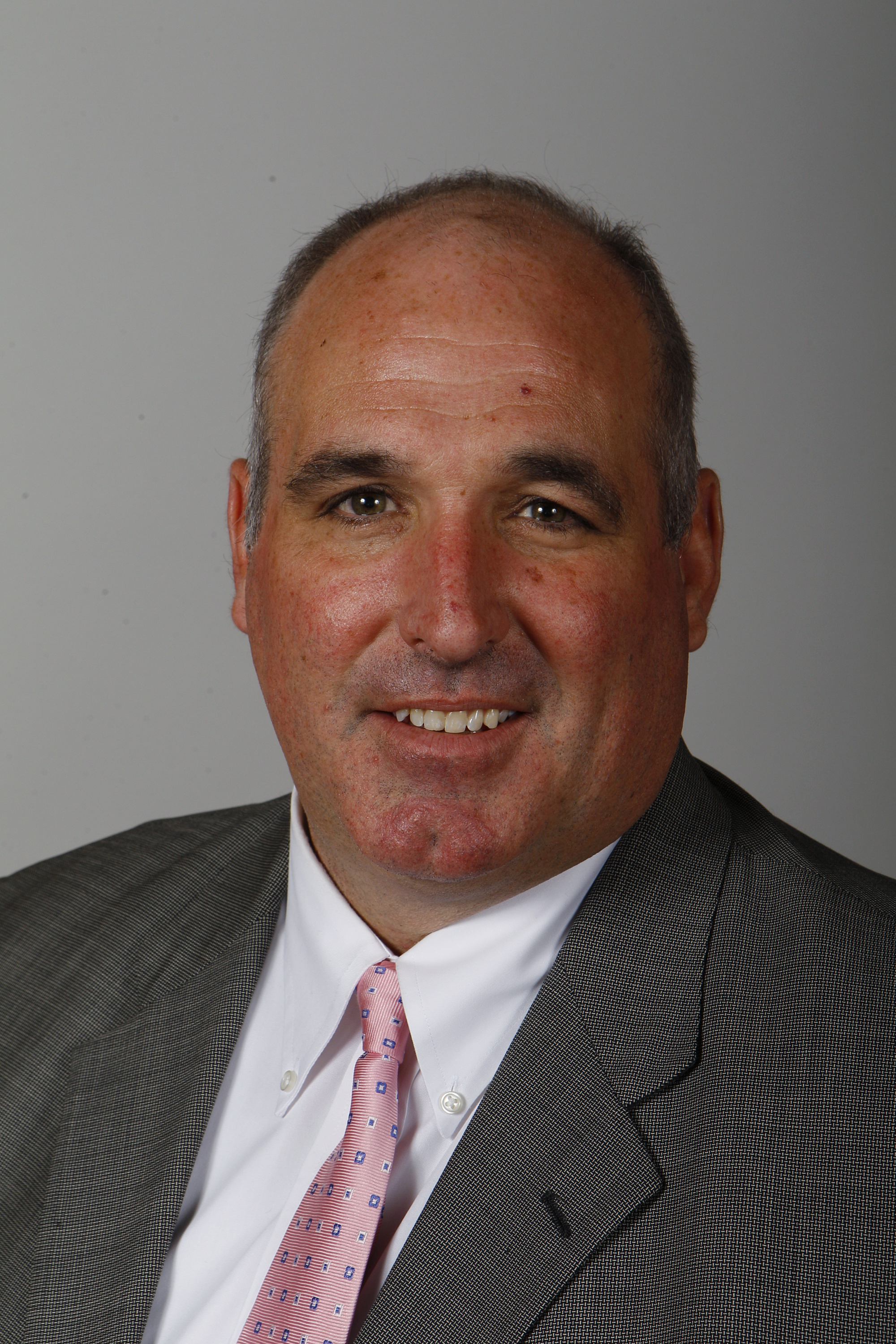

Member of the Iowa Senate from the 38th district
- In office January 10, 2005 – January 13, 2013
- Preceded by: Neal Schuerer
- Succeeded by: Tim Kapucian

Personal details
- Born: 1966 (age 59–60) Oskaloosa, Iowa
- Party: Democrat
- Occupation: Insurance salesman

Thomas J. Rielly (born 1966) is a former Iowa State Senator from the 38th district. A Democrat, he was elected to the Iowa Senate defeating Republican incumbent Neal Schuerer in 2004 with 14,670 votes (52%). In 2013 he retired and challenger Republican Tim Kapucian won the open seat against Shelley Parbs.

Rielly had served on several committees in the Iowa Senate - the Commerce committee; the Economic Growth committee; the Local Government committee; the Agriculture committee, where he is vice chair; and the Transportation committee, where he is chair.

Iowa Senate
Preceded by Neal Schuerer	38th District; 2005 – present	Succeeded by Tim Kapucian
