= Dave Mulder =

American politician

Dave W. Mulder
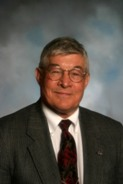

Member of the Iowa Senate from the 2nd district
- In office January 10, 2005 – January 11, 2009
- Preceded by: Kenneth Veenstra
- Succeeded by: Randy Feenstra

Personal details
- Born: February 17, 1939 (age 87) Alton, Iowa
- Party: Republican
- Children: 2
- Education: Morningside College (BS); University of South Dakota (MA, EdD)
- Website: Official

Dave W. Mulder (born February 17, 1939) is an American politician and educator who served as a member of the Iowa Senate for the 2nd District from 2005 to 2009.

== Early life and education ==
Mulder was born in Alton, Iowa. He received his B.S. from Morningside College and his M.A. and Ed.D. from the University of South Dakota. Mulder also took graduate courses at Oklahoma State University–Stillwater, the University of Nebraska–Lincoln, and the Wisconsin School of Business.

== Career ==
Mulder has worked as a professor and coach at Northwestern College in Orange City, Iowa since 1981.

During his tenure in the Iowa Senate, Mulder served on the Senate committee on Agriculture, Economic Growth, Human Resources, and Education committee, where he was the ranking member. He was elected in 2004 with 24,433 votes, running unopposed. Mulder was not a candidate in the 2008 Iowa Senate elections, and was succeeded by businessman Randy Feenstra.

In 2012, Mulder co-authored a book along with Frank B. Wood, titled an Education in Politics: Four Years in the Iowa State Senate 2004-2008.

During the 2016 Republican Party presidential primaries, Mulder endorsed Wisconsin governor Scott Walker. Mulder later became a part of Walker's leadership team in Iowa.

== Personal life ==
Mulder and his wife, Dorothy, have two children named Dick and Amy. They reside in Sioux Center, Iowa.

Iowa Senate
Preceded by Kenneth Veenstra	2nd District; 2005 – 2008	Succeeded by Randy Feenstra
