= Steve Kettering =

American politician (born 1943)

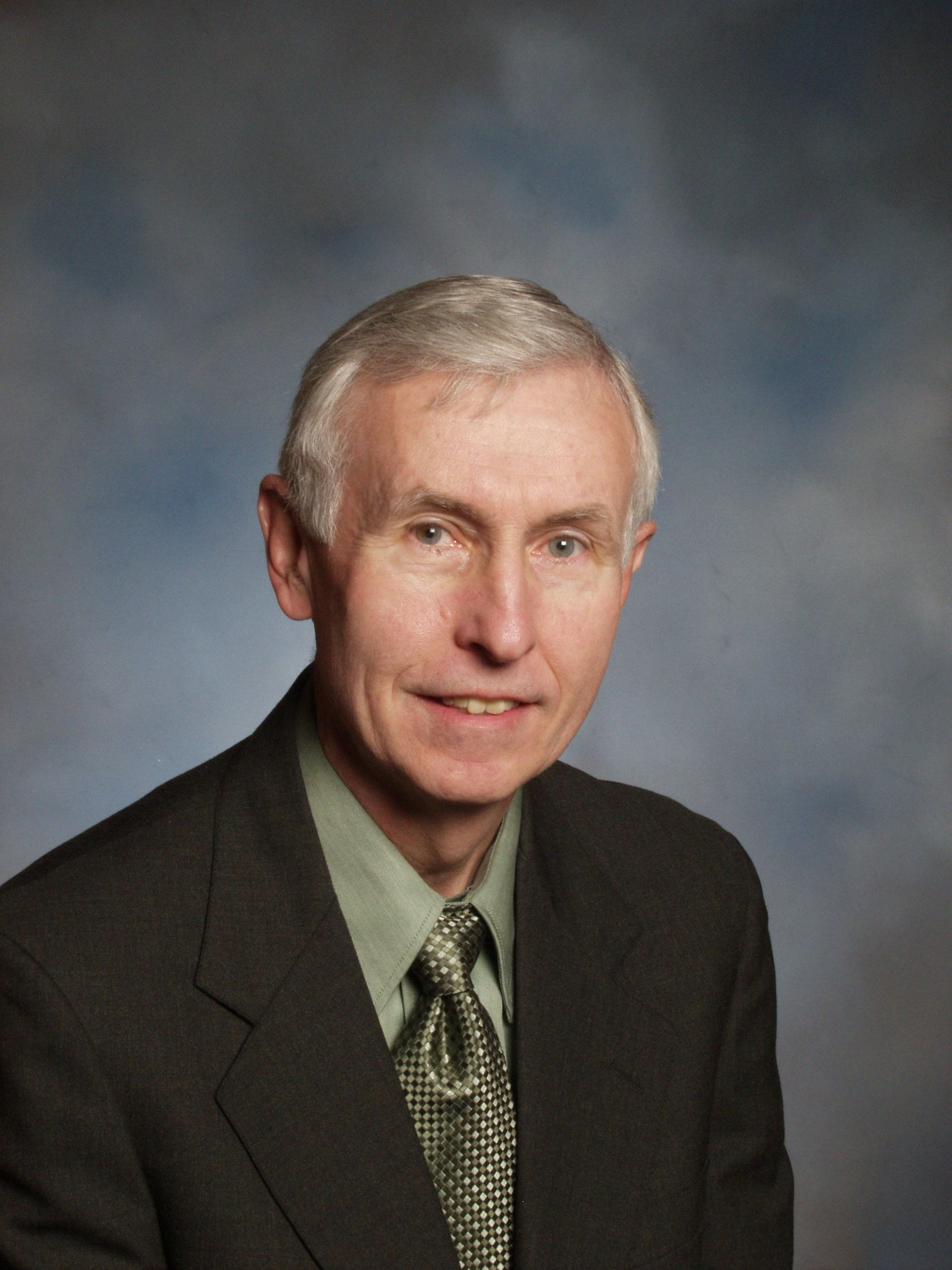

Member of the Iowa Senate from the 26th district
- In office January 13, 2003 – January 13, 2013
- Preceded by: Steve King

Member of the Iowa House of Representatives from the 11th district
- In office January 11, 1999 – January 12, 2003

Personal details
- Born: 1943 (age 82–83) Storm Lake, Iowa, U.S.
- Party: Republican
- Education: Buena Vista College (B.A.); California State University, Long Beach (Master's degree)
- Occupation: Community Banker
- Website: Kettering

Steve Kettering (born 1943) is the former Iowa State Senator from the 26th District. A Republican, he served in the Iowa Senate since 2003, when he won a special election to fill the vacancy left after Steve King was elected to Iowa's 5th congressional district. He got his B.A. from Buena Vista College and his master's degree from California State University, Long Beach.

Kettering currently serves on several committees in the Iowa Senate - the Commerce committee; the Ethics committee; the Natural Resources committee; the Rules and Administration committee; the Appropriations committee, where he is the ranking member; and the Judiciary committee, where he is the ranking member. His prior political experience includes serving as a representative in the Iowa House of Representatives from 1999 to 2003.

Kettering was last re-elected in 2008 with 22,853 votes, unopposed.

Iowa House of Representatives
Preceded by Jim Meyer	11th District; 1999 – 2003	Succeeded by Henry Rayhons
Iowa Senate
Preceded by Steve King	26th District; 2003 – present	Succeeded by Incumbent
