= Mark Zieman =

American politician

Mark L. Zieman
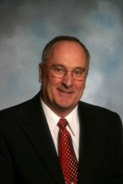

Member of the Iowa Senate from the 8th district 16th (2001–2003)
- In office January 8, 2001 – January 12, 2009
- Preceded by: Lyle Zieman
- Succeeded by: Mary Jo Wilhelm

Personal details
- Born: January 14, 1945 Postville, Iowa, U.S.
- Died: September 18, 2019 (aged 74) Postville, Iowa, U.S.
- Party: Republican
- Spouse: Jennifer
- Children: Four children
- Occupation: Farmer, Trucking Owner
- Website: Senator Zieman's website

Mark L. Zieman (January 14, 1945 – September 18, 2019) was a Republican Iowa State Senator from Iowa. He was formerly part of the leadership of the Iowa Senate. He represented the largely rural 8th district, covering Allamakee, Winneshiek, Chickasaw and Howard counties in the northeastern corner of the state. He served in the Iowa Senate 2001–2009 and was a past co-chair of the Senate Ways and Means Committee.

Prior to his election to state office, he worked with various local government, Republican, and community organizations. His father was the previous state senator from his district.

Zieman was re-elected in 2004 with 15,682 votes (55%), defeating Democratic opponent John Beard. He was an unsuccessful candidate in the Iowa Senate elections, 2008.

== Committees ==
- State Government, Ranking member
- Education
- Judiciary
- Rules and Administration
- Transportation
- Ways and Means
- Education Appropriations Subcommittee

Iowa Senate
Preceded by Lyle Zieman (his father)	16th District; 2001 – 2003	Succeeded by Julie Hosch
Preceded by E. Thurman Gaskill	8th District; 2003 – 2008	Succeeded by Mary Jo Wilhelm
