= Tim Kapucian =

American politician

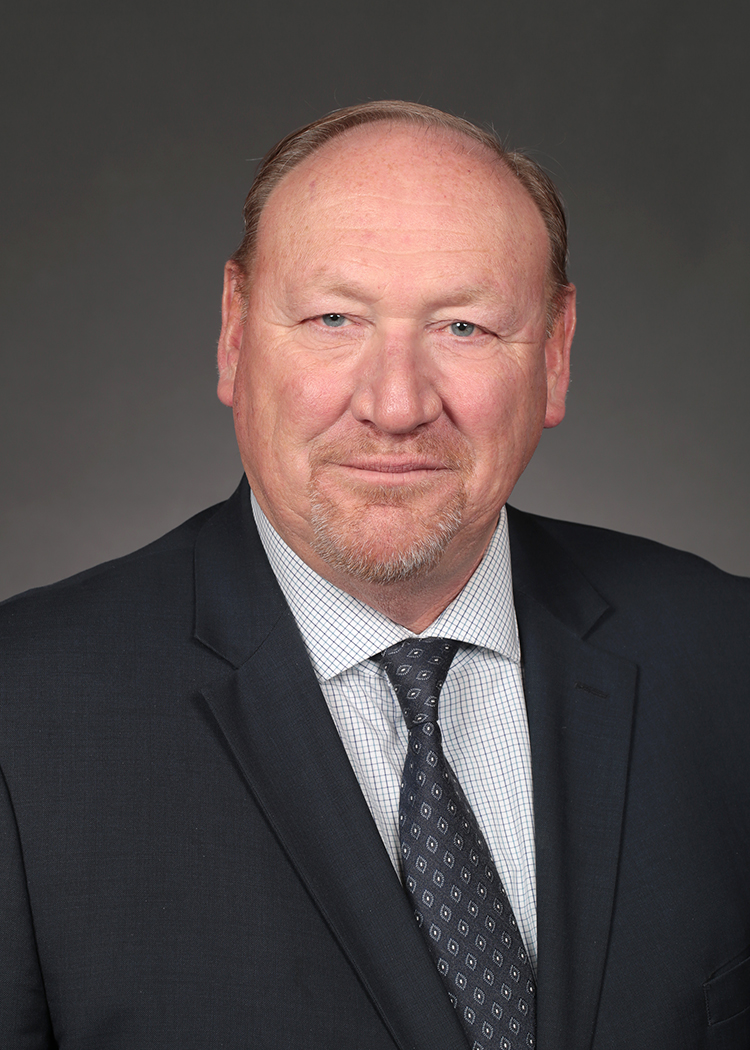

Member of the Iowa Senate from the 38th district
- In office January 12, 2009 – January 11, 2021
- Preceded by: John Putney
- Succeeded by: Dawn Driscoll

Personal details
- Born: August 2, 1957 (age 68) Keystone, Iowa, U.S.
- Party: Republican
- Spouse: Brenda
- Children: 2
- Education: Iowa State University (BS)
- Occupation: Farmer

Tim L. Kapucian (born August 2, 1957) is an American politician who served as a member of the Iowa Senate from the 38th district. A Republican, he served from 2009 to 2021.

== Early life and education ==
Kapucian was born in Keystone, Iowa. He earned a Bachelor of Science degree in animal science from Iowa State University.

== Career ==
A farmer, he is the past president of the Iowa Pork Producers. Kapucian was elected in 2008 to the 20th district with 15,527 votes, defeating Democratic opponent Randy Braden.

During his final session in the Senate, Kapucian served as chair of the Transportation Committee. He was also a member of the Statewide Interoperable Communications System Board.

== Personal life ==
He resides in Keystone, Iowa with his wife Brenda and two children.
