= Jack Kibbie =

American politician (1929–2025)

John Patrick Kibbie
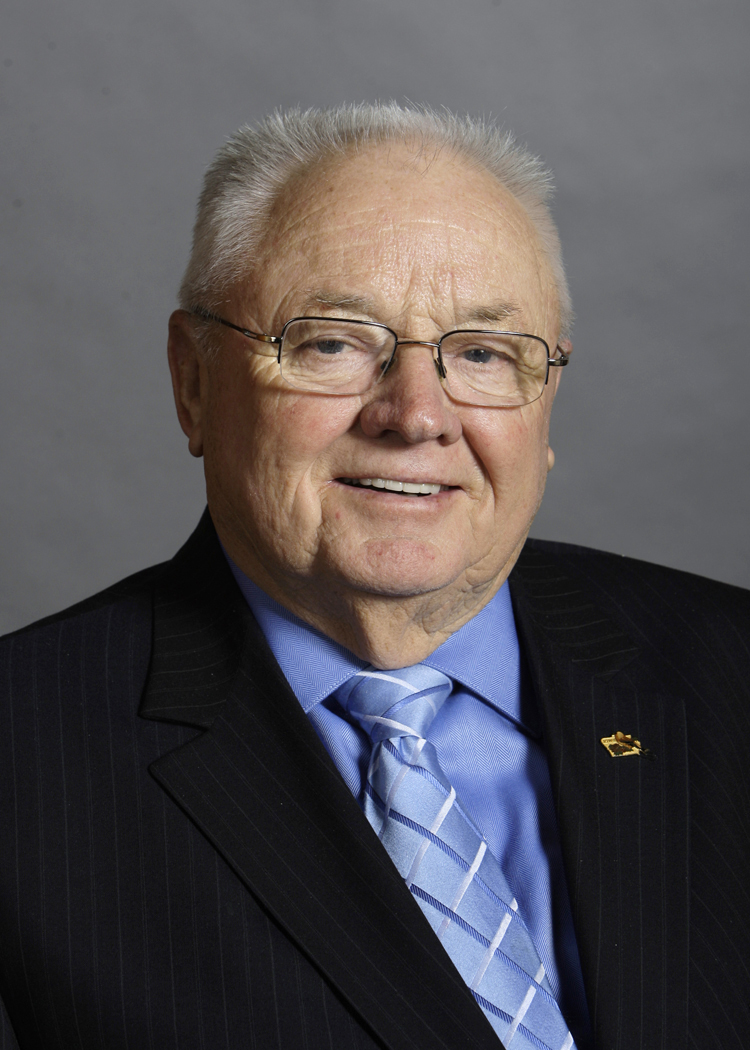

Member of the Iowa Senate from the 4th district
- In office January 11, 1993 – January 13, 2013
- Preceded by: Richard Vande Hoef
- Succeeded by: Dennis Guth

Member of the Iowa Senate from the 6th district
- In office January 9, 1989 – January 10, 1993
- Preceded by: Lee Warren Holt
- Succeeded by: Wayne D. Bennett

Member of the Iowa Senate from the 48th district
- In office January 11, 1965 – January 12, 1969
- Preceded by: John Emmetsburg
- Succeeded by: Marvin Smith

Member of the Iowa House of Representatives from Palo Alto County
- In office 1960–1964
- Preceded by: John Brown
- Succeeded by: Niels Nielsen

Personal details
- Born: John Patrick Kibbie; July 14, 1929 Emmetsburg, Iowa, U.S.
- Died: March 4, 2025 (aged 95)
- Party: Democratic
- Spouse: Kay
- Occupation: Farmer
- Website: Kibbie's website

Military service
- Allegiance: United States
- Branch/service: United States Army
- Battles/wars: Korean War
- Awards: Bronze Star Medal

John Patrick Kibbie (July 14, 1929 – March 4, 2025) was an American politician who served as an Iowa State Senator from the 4th district and President of the Iowa Senate. A Democrat, he had served in the Iowa Senate since 1988 and also served as Iowa Senate President.

Kibbie served on several committees in the Iowa Senate - the Agriculture committee; the Veterans Affairs committee; the Rules and Administration committee, where he was vice chair; the State Government committee, where he was vice chair; and the Ethics committee, where he was chair. His political experience included an earlier term serving in the Iowa Senate senator from 1964 to 1968, served as a representative in the Iowa House from 1960 to 1964, and served as a member of the National Convention Platform Committee in 1968. Kibbie was interviewed by CNN on the 2020 Iowa caucus night, he voiced his support for former Vice President Joe Biden.

Kibbie was last re-elected in 2008 with 18,059 votes, defeating Grassroots for Life opponent Ken Vaske.

On March 4, 2025, Kibbie died at the age of 95.

Iowa House of Representatives
Preceded by John Brown	Palo Alto County; 1960–1964	Succeeded by Niels Nielsen; Emmet and Palo Alto counties
Iowa Senate
Preceded by John Emmetsburg	48th district 1964–1968	Succeeded by Marvin Smith
Preceded by Richard Vande Hoef	4th district 1988–2013	Succeeded by Dennis Guth
