= Kenneth Veenstra =

American politician (born 1939)

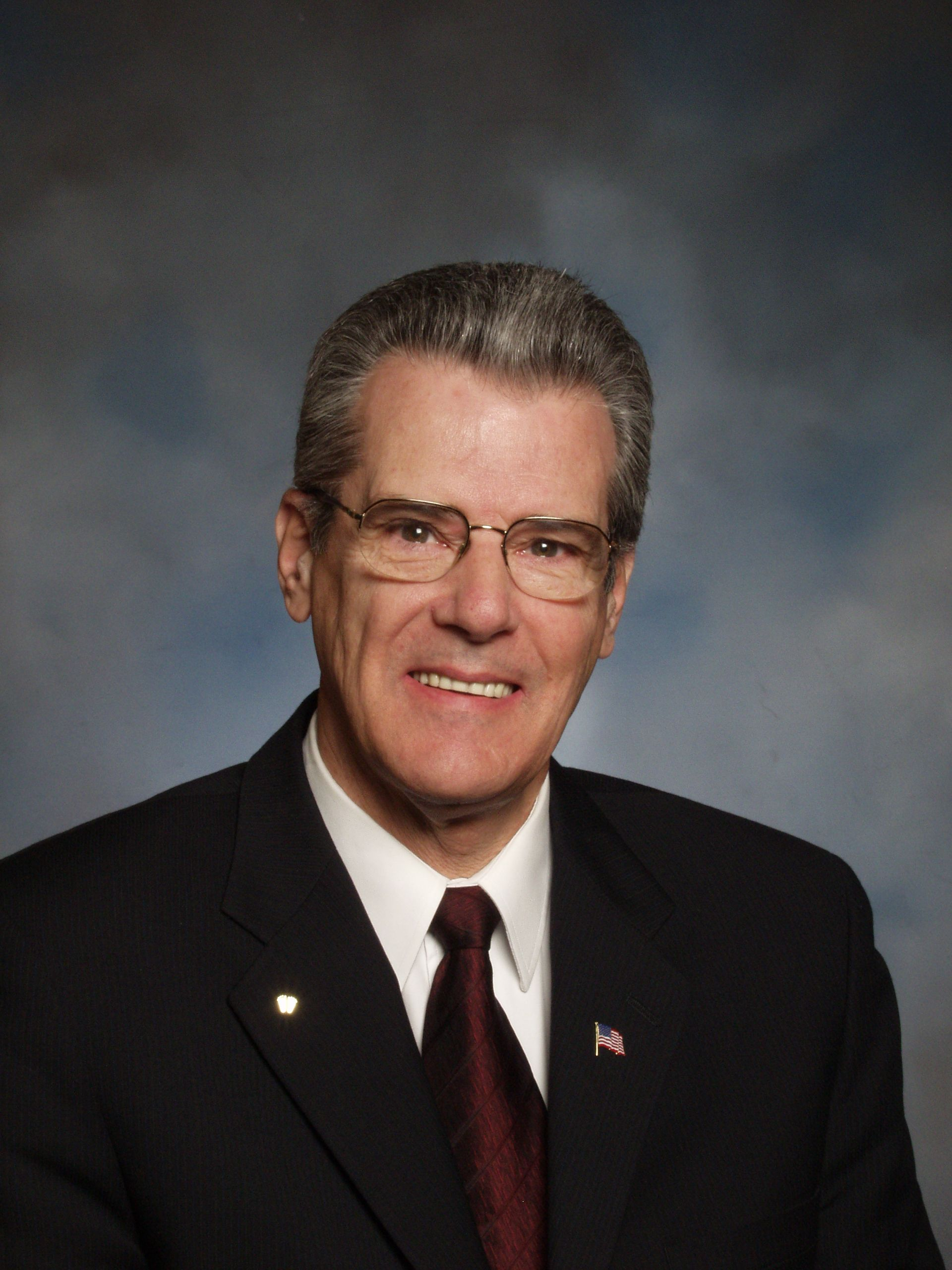

Member of the Iowa Senate from the 2nd district 3rd (1999–2005)
- In office January 11, 1999 – January 9, 2005
- Preceded by: Wilmer Rensink
- Succeeded by: Dave Mulder

Member of the Iowa House of Representatives from the 5th district
- In office January 9, 1995 – January 10, 1999
- Succeeded by: Dwayne Alons

Personal details
- Born: April 19, 1939 (age 87) Bussey, Iowa
- Party: Republican
- Children: 4
- Education: The American College of Financial Services
- Occupation: Insurance agent (retired)
- Website: Veenstra's website

Military service
- Branch/service: United States Army

Kenneth J. Veenstra (born April 19, 1939) is an American businessman and politician who served as a member of both chambers of the Iowa General Assembly.

== Early life and education ==
Born in Bussey, Iowa. Veenstra graduated from Tracy High School. He then served in the United States Army as a military police officer. He attended The American College of Financial Services in Bryn Mawr, Pennsylvania and became a chartered life underwriter.

== Career ==
Veenstra was a resident of Orange City, Iowa and worked as an insurance agent. Veenstra served in the Iowa House of Representatives from 1995 to 1997 as a Republican. He then served in the Iowa Senate from 1999 to 2005.

== Personal life ==
Veenstra and his wife, Janice, have four children.

== Notes ==
Iowa Senate
Preceded by Wilmer Rensink	3rd District; 1999 – 2003	Succeeded by David Johnson
Preceded by John Redwine	2nd District; 2003 – 2005	Succeeded by Dave Mulder
Iowa House of Representatives
Preceded by ??	5th District; 1995 – 1999	Succeeded by Dwayne Alons
