= Bryan Sievers =

American politician (born 1959)

- Bryan Sievers for the 80th General Assembly

Member of the Iowa House of Representatives
- In office January 8, 2001 – January 9, 2005

Member of the Iowa Senate
- In office 2003–2005

Personal details
- Born: May 26, 1959 (age 67) Davenport, Iowa, United States
- Party: Republican
- Spouse: Lisa
- Children: two
- Occupation: Farmer

Bryan J. Sievers (born May 26, 1959) is an American farmer and politician.

Born in Davenport, Iowa, Sievers lived with his family in Stockton, Iowa. He graduated from Bennett High School. Sievers received his bachelor's degree from Iowa State University. Sievers lived in New Liberty, Iowa and was a farmer. Sievers served on the Bennett Community School Board. Sievers served in the Iowa House of Representatives from 2001 to 2003 and was a Republican. He then served in the Iowa State Senate from 2003 to 2005.
