= Shawn Hamerlinck =

American politician

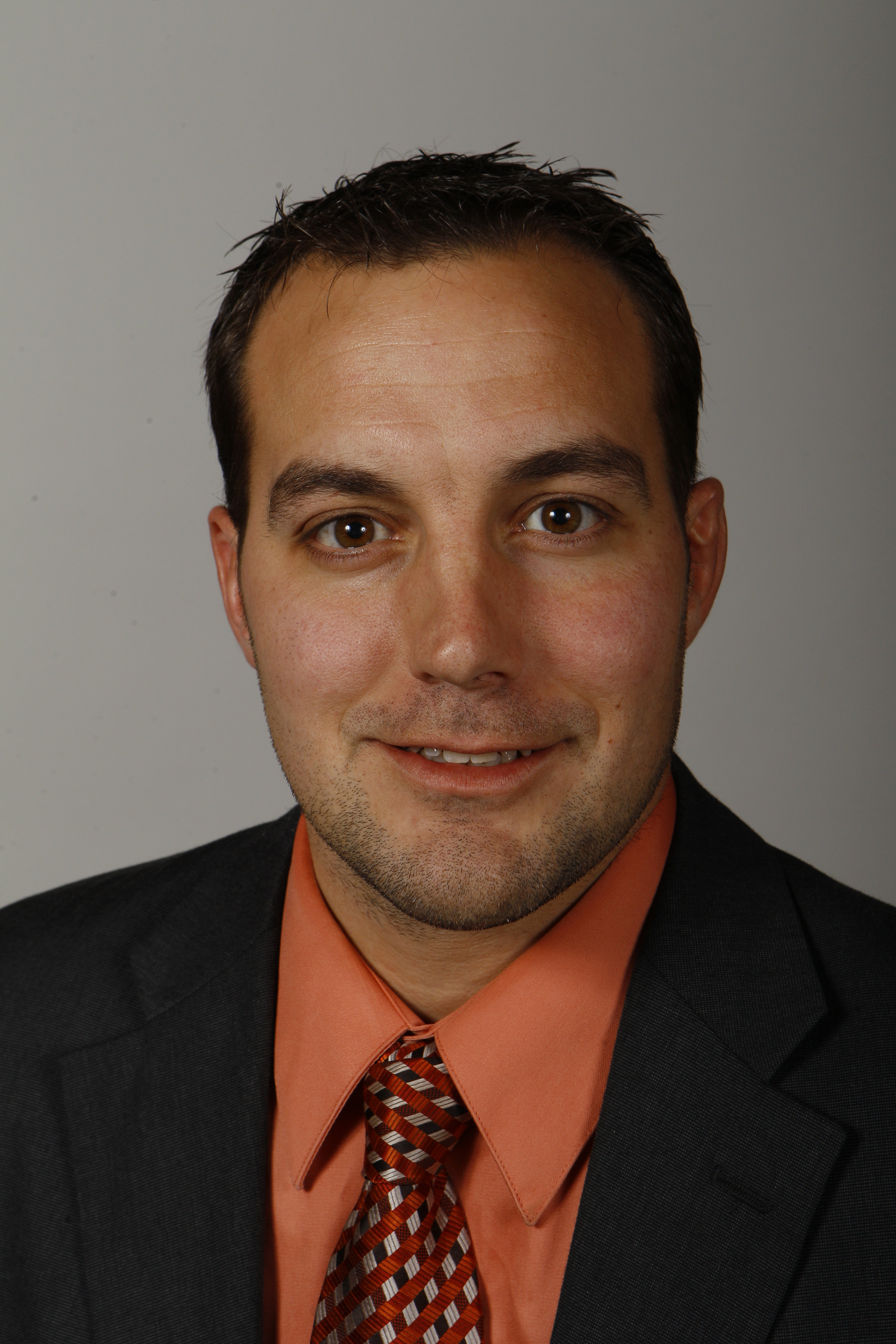
- Born: 1980 (age 45–46) estimated West Davenport, Iowa
- Education: Davenport West High School; Loras College B.A. Loyola University of Chicago (M.A.)
- Occupations: Youth Field Specialist; Adjunct Professor
- Employer(s): Iowa State University, Scott County Extension office Black Hawk College; Augustana College
- Political party: Republican
- Website: www.legis.iowa.gov

Shawn Hamerlinck (born 1980) served one term in the Iowa State Senate, representing the 42nd District. He lost re-election in 2012. Hamerlinck was named in a sexual harassment lawsuit, which claimed that Hamerlinck often commented about women's breasts

He sits on these committees: Economic Growth, Education, Local Government, Rebuild Iowa (Ranking Member), Ways and Means, Appropriations Subcommittee on Transportation, Infrastructure, and Capitals, and the Appropriations Subcommittee.

In 2005, and again in 2007, he was elected an alderman for Davenport's second ward.

He is an adjunct faculty member at Black Hawk College and Augustana College.

U.S. Senator Charles Grassley's Hawkeye PAC (a leadership PAC) donated $3000 to Hamerlinck's campaign on October 18, 2008.

Hamerlinck endorsed Tim Pawlenty in the Iowa caucus phase of the Republican Party presidential primaries, 2012.

== 2011 education budget ==
In a budget hearing on 6 June 2011, a number of student leaders from the regents institutions of Iowa testified that they and their institutions were financially squeezed, and were likely to be further squeezed absent a bigger allocation from the state. They were: Spencer Walrath, president of the University of Northern Iowa student government; Jared Knight, vice president of the Government of the Student Body at Iowa State University; Elliot Higgins, president of the University of Iowa Student Government; Dr. Lyndsay Harshman, a graduate of the University of Iowa medical school who is past president of the Council of Graduate & Professional Students; and Michael Appel, a University of Iowa College of Law student who is vice president of the Executive Council of Graduate & Professional Students. After listening to their remarks, Sen. Hamerlinck told them, "I do not like it when students actually come here and lobby me for funds. That's just my opinion. I want to wish you guys the best. I want you to go home and graduate. But this political theater, leave the circus to us, OK?"

The right to petition government is protected by the First Amendment to the Constitution of the United States. All student leaders testifying on 6 June 2011 were of majority age and citizens of Iowa and the United States.

Hamerlinck objected that Democrats were exploiting student sentiment to drive a political wedge, and urged the students to focus less on politics and more on their own studies and careers.

Preceded by Frank B. Wood	Iowa State Senate district 42; 2008–present	Succeeded by incumbent
