= Brian Schoenjahn =

American politician

Brian H. Schoenjahn
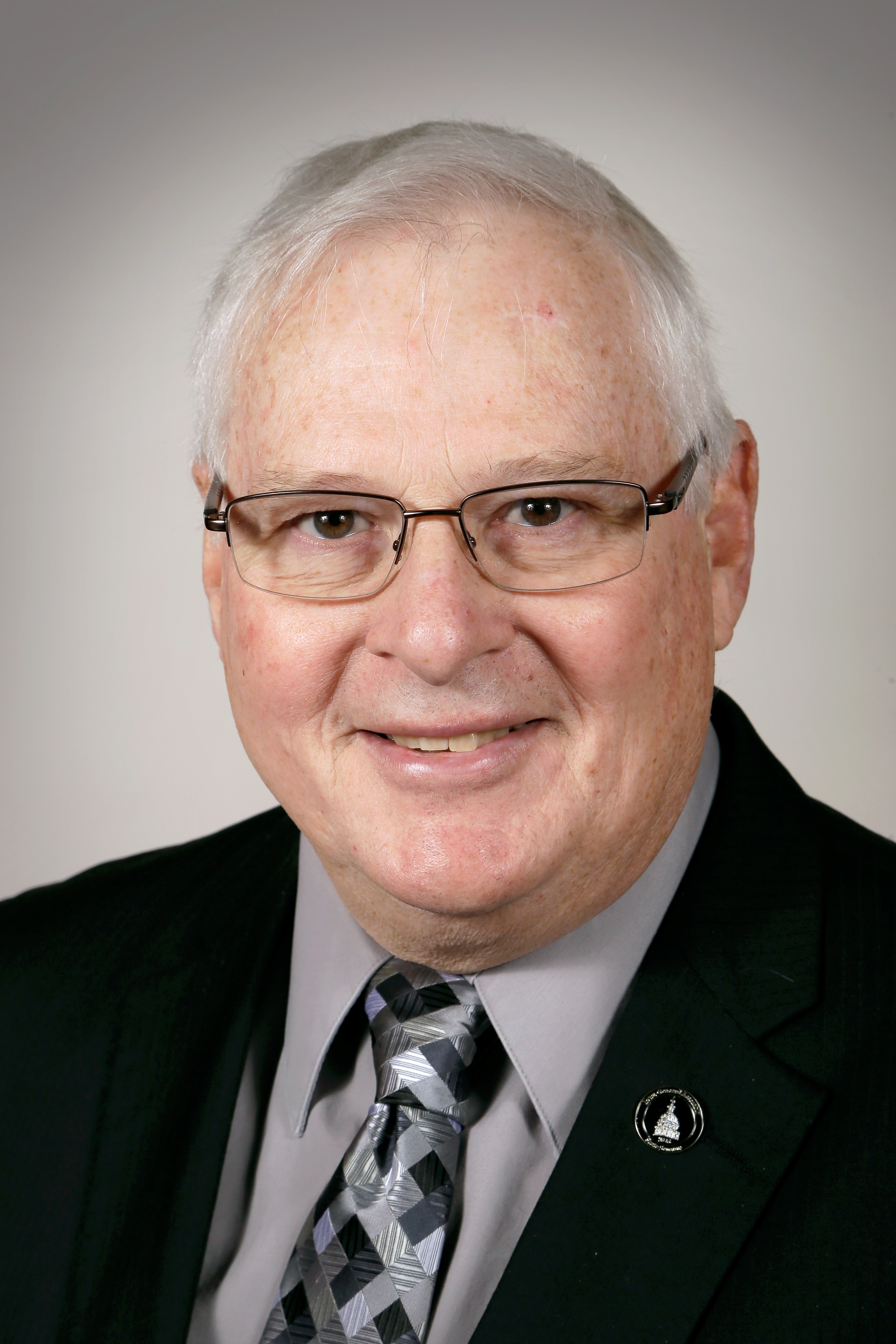

Member of the Iowa Senate from the 12th district
- In office January 10, 2005 – January 8, 2017
- Preceded by: Kitty Rehberg
- Succeeded by: Craig Johnson

Personal details
- Born: 1949 (age 76–77) Carroll, Iowa
- Party: Democratic
- Spouse: Barbara
- Children: 1
- Education: University of Northern Iowa (BA, MA)
- Profession: Teacher
- Website: Schoenjahn's website

Brian H. Schoenjahn (born 1949) is a politician and a former Iowa State Senator from the 12th District. A Democrat, he has served in the Iowa Senate from 2005 until 2017. He received his B.A. in Social Science and his M.A. in Political Science from the University of Northern Iowa.

Schoenjahn currently serves on several committees in the Iowa Senate - the Appropriations committee; the Judiciary committee; the Local Government committee; the Natural Resources committee; and the Education committee, where he is vice chair. He also serves as chair of the Education Appropriations Subcommittee. Prior political experience includes serving as mayor of Arlington, Iowa from 1977 to 2004.

Schoenjahn was re-elected in 2008 with 17,402 votes, defeating Republican opponent Rebecca Wearmouth.

== Electoral history ==
Electoral history for Schoenjahn in the Iowa Senate.

Year	% Schoenjahn	Opponent	Party affiliation	% of vote
2004	52.8%	Ron Longmuir	Republican	47.2%
2008	64.3%	Rebecca Wearmouth	Republican	35.7%
2012	53.2%	Elliot Henderson	Republican	46.8%

Iowa Senate
Preceded by Kitty Rehberg	12th District; 2005 – 2017	Succeeded by Craig Johnson
