= Dick Dearden =

American politician (1938–2019)

Dick L. Dearden
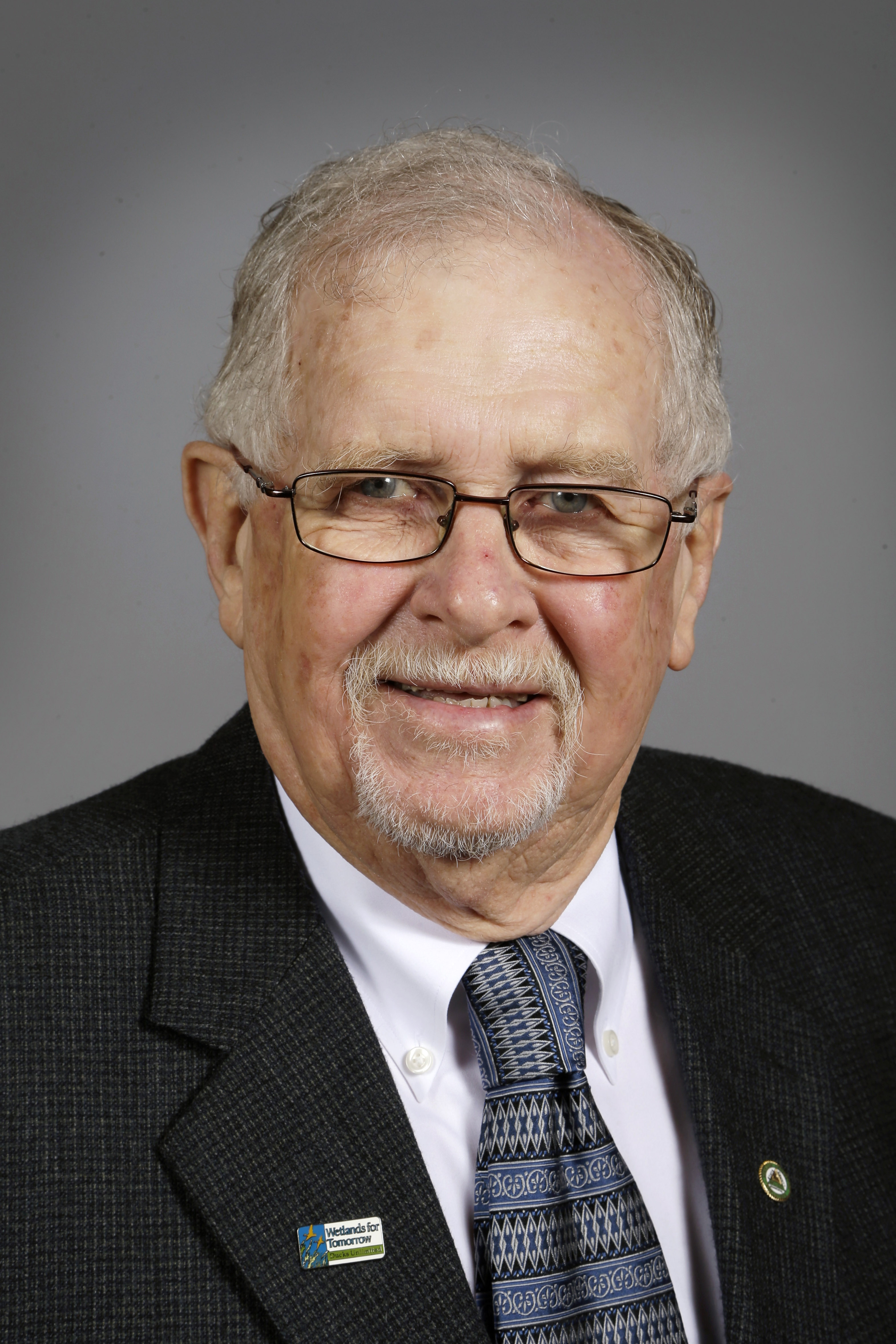

Member of the Iowa Senate from the 34th district 35th (1995–2003)
- In office January 9, 1995 – January 8, 2017
- Preceded by: Florence Buhr
- Succeeded by: Nate Boulton

Personal details
- Born: June 3, 1938 Des Moines, Iowa, U.S.
- Died: November 2, 2019 (aged 81) Des Moines, Iowa, U.S.
- Party: Democratic
- Spouse: Sharon
- Children: 3
- Website: Dearden's website

Dick Leslie Dearden (June 3, 1938 – November 2, 2019) was an American politician who was the Iowa State Senator from the 34th District. A Democrat, he served in the Iowa Senate from 1995 to 2017 representing the Northeast part of Des Moines and Pleasant Hill, Iowa.

== Education ==
Dearden graduated from Des Moines East High School.

== Career ==
Dearden served on several committees in the Iowa Senate - the Appropriations committee; the Labor and Business Relations committee; the Rules and Administration committee; the State Government committee; the Ethics committee, where he is vice chair; and the Natural Resources committee, where he is chair. His prior political experience includes serving on the Polk County Central Committee since 1972, serving as Chairman of the Polk County Democrats from 1980 to 1982, and serving as a delegate to the 1996 Democratic National Convention.

Dearden was re-elected in 2008 with 17,704 votes, defeating Republican opponent Scott Strosahl.

== Personal life ==
Dearden was married to his wife Sharon since 1959 and together they had two sons, David and Mark, and one daughter, Pamela.

Dearden was also a veteran of the National Guard. He died on November 2, 2019, in Des Moines, Iowa, at the age of 81.

== Organizations ==
Dearden was a member of the following organizations:

- AMVETS
- American Federation of State, County, and Municipal Employees retirees
- Izaak Walton League
- Pheasants Forever
- Ducks Unlimited
- National Wild Turkey Federation
- Former chairman of the Polk County Democratic Party

Iowa Senate
| Preceded by Florence Buhr | 35th District; 1995 – 2003 | Succeeded by Jeff Lamberti |
| Preceded by Matt McCoy | 34th District; 2003 – 2017 | Succeeded by Nate Boulton |
