= Jeff Danielson =

American politician

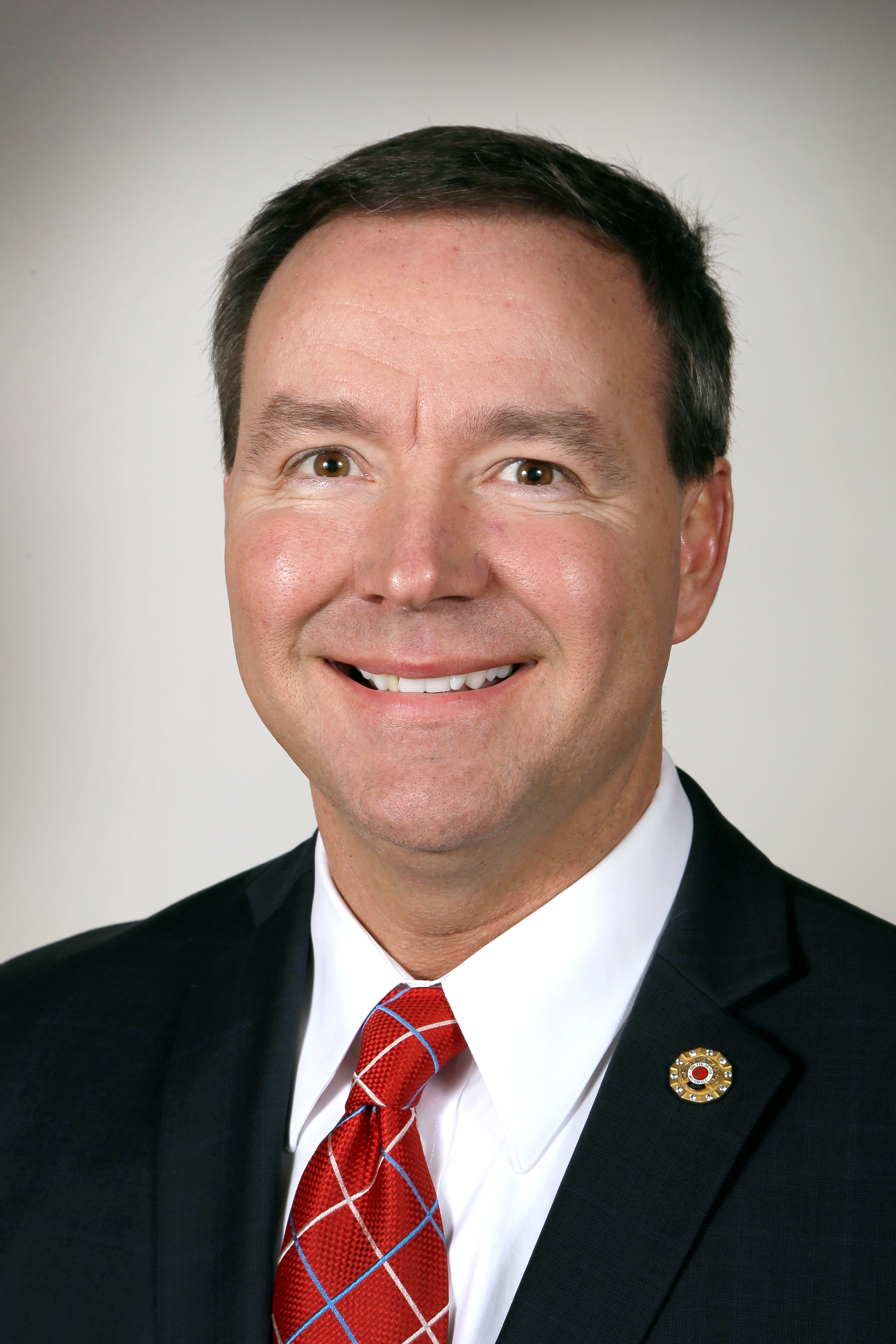

Member of the Iowa Senate from the 30th district
- In office 2013–2019
- Preceded by: Pat Ward
- Succeeded by: Eric Giddens

Member of the Iowa Senate from the 10th district
- In office 2005 – 2013 (redistricted)
- Preceded by: Merlin Bartz
- Succeeded by: Jake Chapman

President Pro Tempore of the Iowa Senate
- In office 2006–2012

Personal details
- Born: August 6, 1970 (age 56) Waterloo, Iowa, U.S.
- Party: Democratic
- Spouse: Kim
- Children: 2
- Education: Hawkeye Community College (A.A.); University of Northern Iowa (B.A., M.P.P.)
- Profession: Firefighter
- Website: Danielson's website

Jeff Danielson (born August 6, 1970) is a former Democratic Iowa State Senator. Having served the 30th Senate District between 2013 and 2019, he had also previously served the 10th Senate District up until redistricting, between 2005 and 2013.

Danielson served on following committees: Appropriations (Vice Chair), Economic Growth, State Government (Chair), Transportation, Veterans Affairs (Vice Chair), and the Administration and Regulation Appropriations Subcommittee (Vice Chair). Permanent statutory committees he serves on include: Public Retirement Systems and State Government Efficiency Review. Danielson additionally serves on the Iowa Capital Investment Board.

His prior public service experience includes experience as the Commissioner of the Iowa Department of Transportation and the Waterloo Planning, Programming, and Zoning Commission. He is a U.S. Navy veteran and served the community of Cedar Falls as a professional firefighter, before resigning from his position as a firefighter and legislator and moving to Minnesota. He now works as the Vice President of Advocacy for the Clean Grid Alliance.

== Iowa Senate ==
Danielson was first elected in 2004 with 16,712 votes (54%), defeating Republican opponent Frank Dowie. He was re-elected in 2008 with 16,103 votes. He defeated his opponent, Republican Walt Rogers, by only 22 votes, following administrative recounts in two precincts and a district-wide recount.

Due to redistricting, most of Iowa Senate District 10 became District 30 in the 2012 election and became effective on January 13, 2013.

More recently Danielson has been exploring the legalization of online poker in the state of Iowa. The most recent legislation signed by Governor Terry Branstad explores the online gaming by instructing Iowa's Racing and Gaming Commission to submit a report on the issue.

As Vice-chair of the Veterans Affairs committee and a veteran of the United States Navy, Danielson advocated for pro-veteran legislation.

Danielson previously served as President Pro Tempore of the Iowa Senate from 2006 to 2012.

In early 2019 he resigned from the Senate, saying "I can't make the Senate service work given that I have to raise my family and pay the bills" after resigning his job as a firefighter. He found a job working as a lobbyist for the American Wind Energy Association, which led to a special election.

Iowa Senate
Preceded by Pat Ward	30th district 2013–2019	Succeeded by Eric Giddens
Preceded by Merlin Bartz	10th district 2005–2013	Succeeded by Jake Chapman
