= Julie Hosch =

American politician

Julie Hosch (born December 7, 1939) was an American farmer and politician.

Born in Manchester, Iowa, Hosch went to Kirkwood and Northeast Iowa Community Colleges. Hosch was a farmer and cattle dealer in Cascade, Iowa. From 2003 to 2005, Hosch served in the Iowa State Senate and was a Republican.
