= John Putney =

American politician

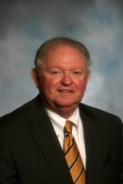

Member of the Iowa Senate from the 20 district
- In office January 13, 2003 – January 12, 2009
- Preceded by: Tom Fiegen
- Succeeded by: Tim Kapucian

Personal details
- Born: March 6, 1944 (age 82) Gladbrook, Iowa
- Party: Republican
- Spouse: Emily
- Children: 3 children
- Education: Iowa State University; University of Nebraska
- Occupation: Exececutive Director - Iowa State Fair Blue Ribbon Foundation
- Website: Putney's website

John Putney (born March 6, 1944) was the Iowa State Senator from the 20th District and minority whip. A Republican, he served in the Iowa Senate from 2003 until his 2009 retirement. He attended the University of Nebraska and received his Bachelors in Farm Operations from Iowa State University.

Putney served on several committees in the Iowa Senate during his last term - the Agriculture committee; the Appropriations committee; the Commerce committee; the Ethics committee; the Transportation committee; and the Ways and Means committee. He was the ranking member of the Transportation, Infrastructure, and Capitals Appropriations Subcommittee.

Putney was re-elected in 2004 with 21,784 votes in an uncontested election. He did not be seek re-election to the Senate in 2008.

Iowa Senate
Preceded by Thomas Fiegen	20th District; 2003 – 2009	Succeeded by Tim Kapucian
