= 2020 United States House of Representatives elections in Iowa =

- November 3, 2020

All 4 Iowa seats to the United States House of Representatives
	Majority party	Minority party
Party	Republican	Democratic
Last election	1	3
Seats won	3	1
Seat change	▲2	▼2
Popular vote	859,418	762,271
Percentage	52.42%	46.5%
Swing	▲5.88%	▼4.02%

Republican hold Republican gain
Democratic hold
Republican
40–50%
50–60%
60–70%
70–80%
80–90%
Democratic
40–50%
50–60%
60–70%

The 2020 United States House of Representatives elections in Iowa was held on November 3, 2020, to elect the four U.S. representatives from the state of Iowa, one from each of the state's four congressional districts. The elections coincided with the 2020 U.S. presidential election, as well as other elections to the House of Representatives, elections to the United States Senate, and various state and local elections.

== Overview ==
Party	Candi- dates	Votes		Seats		
Party	Candi- dates	No.	%	No.	+/–	%
Republican Party	4	859,418	52.42%	3	▲2	75.00%
Democratic Party	4	762,271	46.5%	1	▼2	25.00%
Libertarian Party	1	15,361	0.94%	0	Steady	0.00%
Write-in		2,413	0.15%	0	Steady	0.00%
Total	9	1,639,463	100.0%	4	Steady	100.00%

Popular vote
Republican	52.42%
Democratic	46.5%
Other	1.09%

House seats
Republican	75.00%
Democratic	25.00%

=== By district ===
District	Republican		Democratic		Others		Total		Result
District	Votes	%	Votes	%	Votes	%	Votes	%	Result
District 1	212,088	51.25%	201,347	48.65%	434	0.10%	413,869	100%	Republican gain
District 2	196,964	49.912%	196,958	49.910%	703	0.178%	394,625	100%	Republican gain
District 3	212,997	47.55%	219,205	48.94%	15,745	3.51%	447,947	100%	Democratic hold
District 4	237,369	61.97%	144,761	37.80%	892	0.23%	383,022	100%	Republican hold
Total	859,418	52.42%	762,271	46.50%	17,774	1.08%	1,639,463	100%	

== District 1 ==
2020 Iowa's 1st congressional district election
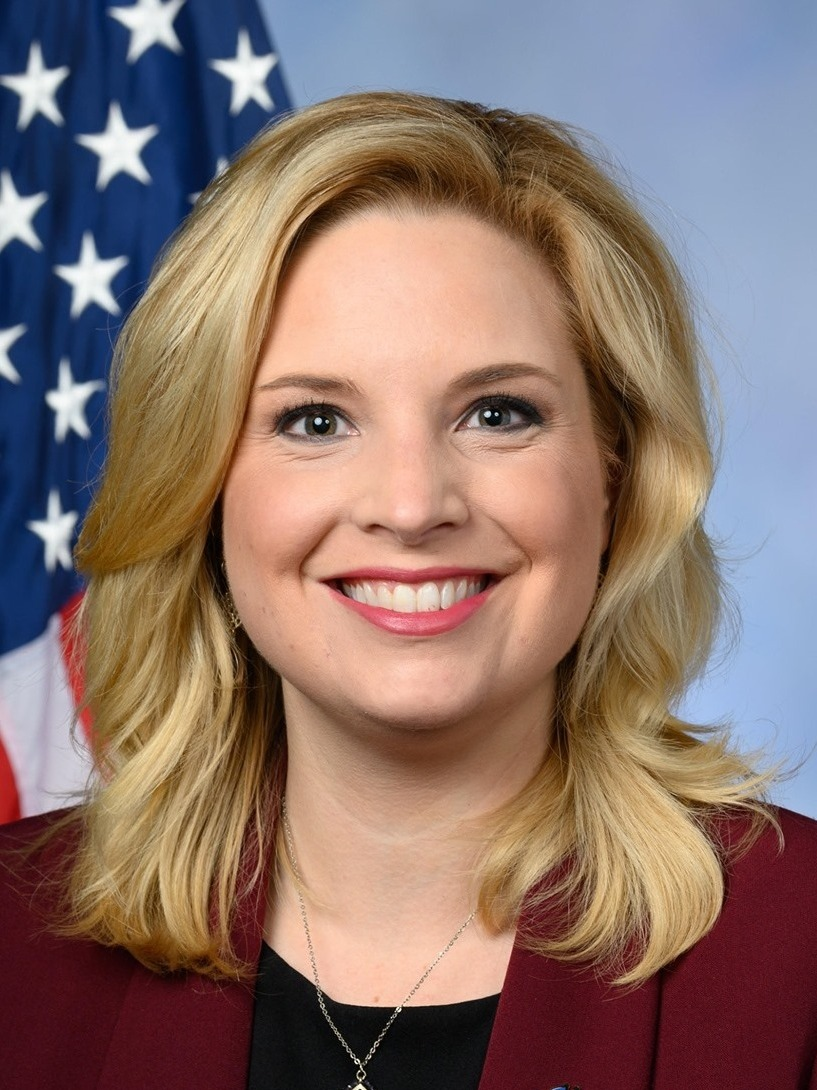

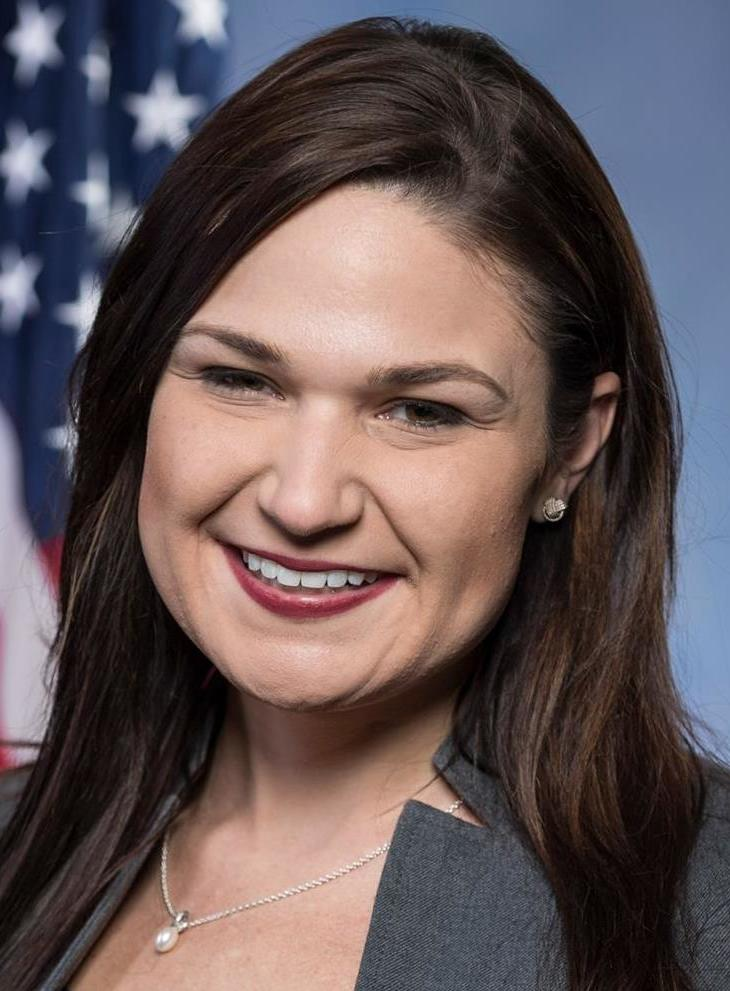
Nominee	Ashley Hinson	Abby Finkenauer
Party	Republican	Democratic
Popular vote	212,088	201,347
Percentage	51.2%	48.7%
- County results Hinson: 50–60% 60–70% Finkenauer: 50–60%
U.S. Representatives before election
Abby Finkenauer
Democratic
Elected U.S. Representatives
Ashley Hinson
Republican

The 1st district is based in northeastern Iowa, and includes the cities of Dubuque, Cedar Rapids and Waterloo. The incumbent was Democrat Abby Finkenauer, who flipped the district and was elected with 51.0% of the vote in 2018.

=== Democratic primary ===
==== Candidates ====
===== Nominee =====
- Abby Finkenauer, incumbent U.S. representative

==== Endorsements ====
Abby Finkenauer

Former US executive branch officials

- Barack Obama, former president of the United States (2009–2017), former senator from Illinois (2005–2008)

Federal officials

- Elizabeth Warren, U.S. senator from Massachusetts (2013–present), 2020 candidate for president

Organizations

- EMILY's List
- End Citizens United
- J Street PAC
- League of Conservation Voters Action Fund
- NARAL Pro-Choice America
- Planned Parenthood Action Fund
- Sierra Club

==== Results ====
2020 Iowa's 1st congressional district Democratic primary results by county: Map legend: Finkenauer—100%; Finkenauer—≥90%

Democratic primary results
Party	Candidate	Votes	%
Democratic	Abby Finkenauer (incumbent)	72,474	99.3
Write-in		482	0.7
Total votes		72,956	100.0

=== Republican primary ===
==== Candidates ====
===== Nominee =====
- Ashley Hinson, state representative

===== Defeated in primary =====
- Thomas Hansen, farmer and businessman

===== Declined =====
- Rod Blum, former U.S. representative

==== Endorsements ====
Ashley Hinson

State and local politicians

- Adam Gregg, lieutenant governor of Iowa
- Kim Reynolds, governor of Iowa

Organizations

- Maggie's List
- Susan B. Anthony List

==== Results ====
2020 Iowa's 1st congressional district Republican primary results by county: Map legend: Hinson—80–90%; Hinson—70–80%; Hinson—60–70%; Hinson—50–60%

Republican primary results
Party	Candidate	Votes	%
Republican	Ashley Hinson	38,552	77.8
Republican	Thomas Hansen	10,845	21.9
Write-in		152	0.3
Total votes		49,549	100.0

=== General election ===
==== Debate ====
2020 Iowa's 1st congressional district debate
No.	Date	Host	Moderator	Link	Democratic	Republican
Key: P Participant A Absent N Not invited I Invited W Withdrawn						
Key: P Participant A Absent N Not invited I Invited W Withdrawn					Abby Finkenauer	Ashley Hinson
1	Sep. 7, 2020	Iowa PBS			P	P

==== Predictions ====
Source	Ranking	As of
The Cook Political Report	Tossup	November 2, 2020
Inside Elections	Lean D	October 28, 2020
Sabato's Crystal Ball	Lean D	November 2, 2020
Politico	Tossup	September 8, 2020
Daily Kos	Lean D	October 15, 2020
RCP	Tossup	October 13, 2020
Niskanen	Lean D	July 26, 2020
The Economist	Likely D	October 2, 2020

==== Polling ====
Poll source	Date(s) administered	Sample size (Note: Key: A – all adults RV – registered voters LV – likely voters V – unclear)	Margin of error	Abby Finkenauer (D)	Ashley Hinson (R)	Other/ Undecided
Monmouth University	October 15–20, 2020	352 (RV)	± 5.2%	52%	44%	4% (Note: "No one" with 1%; Undecided with 3%)
Monmouth University	October 15–20, 2020	352 (LV) (Note: With a likely voter turnout model featuring higher turnout than in the 2016 presidential election)	± 5.2%	54%	44%	–
Monmouth University	October 15–20, 2020	352 (LV) (Note: With a likely voter turnout model featuring lower turnout than in the 2016 presidential election)	± 5.2%	56%	42%	–
Basswood Research (R) (Note: This poll's sponsor, the Congressional Leadership Fund, had endorsed Hinson prior to the poll's sampling period.)	September 26–28, 2020	400 (LV)	± 4.9%	45%	45%	10% (Note: Undecided with 10%)
Monmouth University	July 25 – August 3, 2020	391 (RV)	± 5%	51%	41%	9% (Note: "Other/none" with 1%; Undecided with 8%)
Monmouth University	July 25 – August 3, 2020	391 (LV)	± 5%	52%	41%	8% (Note: "Other/none" with 1%; Undecided with 7%)
Monmouth University	July 25 – August 3, 2020	391 (LV)	± 5%	52%	40%	8%
Public Opinion Strategies (R) (Note: Poll sponsored by the NRCC)	March 3–5, 2020	400 (LV)	± 4.0%	45%	44%	–
Harper Polling (R) (Note: The Future Leaders Fund is a pro-Republican PAC)	January 11–12, 2020	400 (LV)	± 4.0%	44% (Note: Standard VI response)	40%	15%
Harper Polling (R)	January 11–12, 2020	400 (LV)	± 4.0%	40% (Note: Response after pollster addresses respondents with message testing)	48%	–

Hypothetical polling

Generic Democrat vs Generic Republican

Poll source	Date(s) administered	Sample size	Margin of error	Generic Democrat	Generic Republican	Other	Undecided
Selzer & Co./Des Moines Register	October 26–29, 2020	– (LV) (Note: Not yet released)	± 7.1%	36%	51%	9% (Note: "Refused" with 5%; "Someone else" with 3%; would not vote with 1%)	5% (Note: Includes "Do not remember")
Selzer and Co./Des Moines Register	September 14–17, 2020	– (LV) (Note: Not yet released; IA-01 subsample of statewide sample of 658)	± 7.8%	47%	41%	–	–
Selzer and Co./Des Moines Register	June 7–10, 2020	– (LV) (Note: Not yet released; IA-01 subsample of statewide sample of 674)	<= ± 7.7%	48%	42%	–	–
Public Opinion Strategies (R)	March 3–5, 2020	400 (LV)	± 4%	37%	44%	–	–
Selzer and Co./Des Moines Register	March 2–5, 2020	– (LV) (Note: Not yet released; IA-01 subsample of statewide sample of 667)	–	46%	49%	–	–
Harper Polling (R)	January 11–12, 2020	400 (LV)	± 4%	43%	44%	–	–

==== Results ====
Iowa's 1st congressional district, 2020
Party	Candidate	Votes	%
Republican	Ashley Hinson	212,088	51.2
Democratic	Abby Finkenauer (incumbent)	201,347	48.7
Write-in		434	0.1
Total votes		413,869	100.0
Republican gain from Democratic			

== District 2 ==
2020 Iowa's 2nd congressional district election
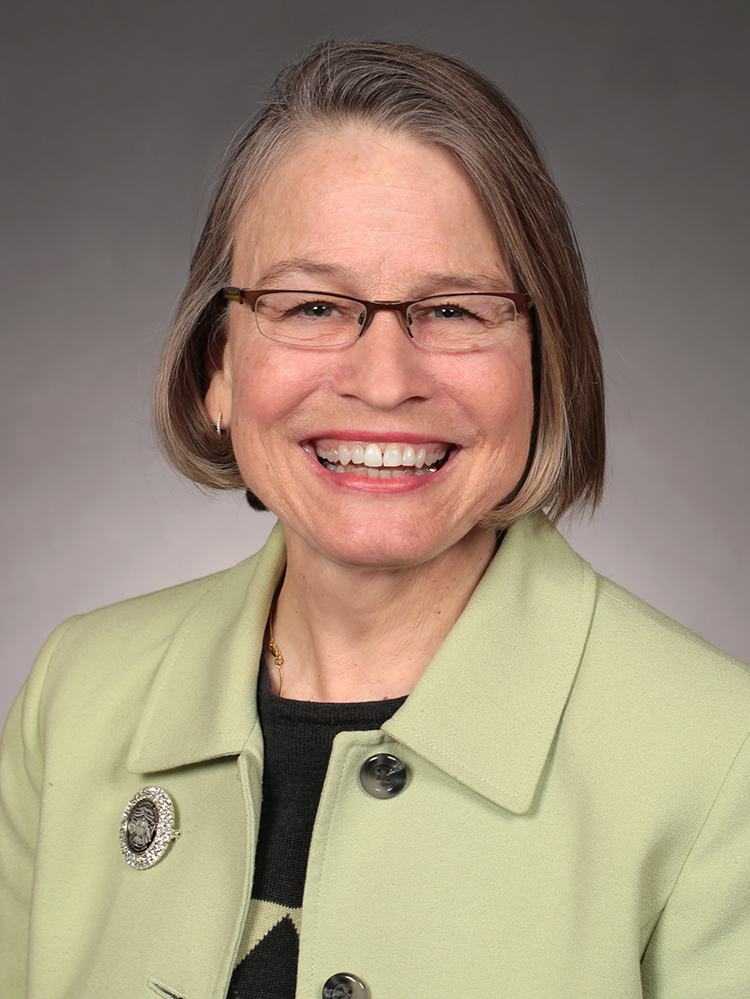

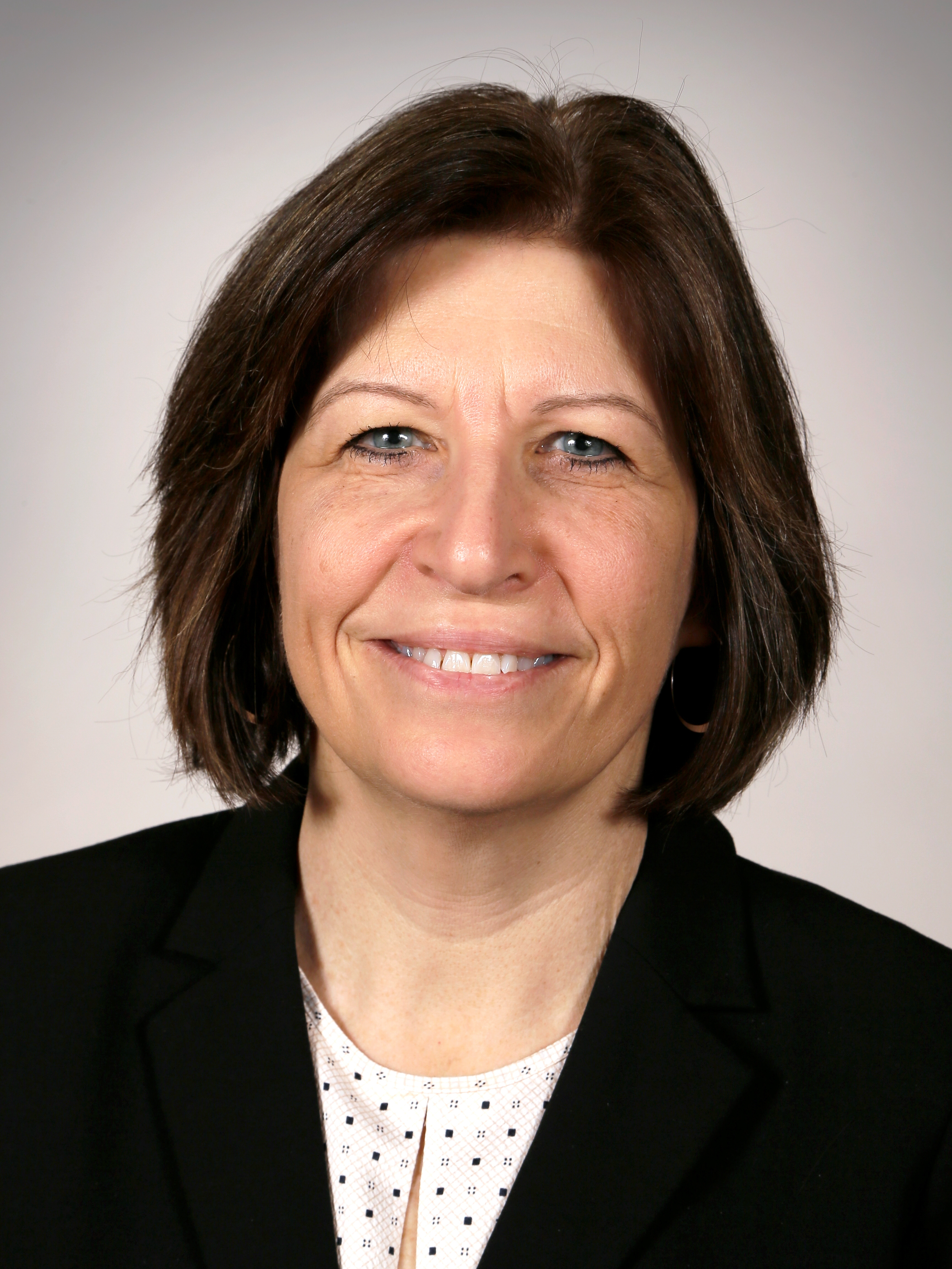
Nominee	Mariannette Miller-Meeks	Rita Hart
Party	Republican	Democratic
Popular vote	196,964	196,958
Percentage	49.912%	49.910%
- County results Miller-Meeks: 50–60% 60–70% 70–80% Hart: 50–60% 60–70%
U.S. Representative before election
Dave Loebsack
Democratic
Elected U.S. Representative
Mariannette Miller-Meeks
Republican

The 2nd district encompasses southeastern Iowa, and is home to the cities of Davenport, Iowa City, Muscatine, Clinton, Burlington, Ottumwa, Fort Madison, Oskaloosa, Bettendorf, Newton and Pella. The incumbent was Democrat Dave Loebsack, who was re-elected with 54.8% of the vote in 2018. On April 12, 2019, he announced that he would not seek re-election.

=== Democratic primary ===
==== Candidates ====
===== Nominee =====
- Rita Hart, former state senator and nominee for Lieutenant Governor of Iowa in 2018

===== Withdrawn =====
- Newman Abuissa, engineer

===== Declined =====
- Ken Croken, member of the Scott County Board of Supervisors
- Cathy Glasson, union leader, nurse, and candidate for governor of Iowa in 2018
- Kevin Kinney, state senator
- Dave Loebsack, incumbent U.S. representative
- Ian Russell, attorney
- Veronica Tessler, businesswoman (endorsed Hart)
- Zach Wahls, state senator

==== Endorsements ====
Rita Hart

Former US executive branch officials

- Barack Obama, former president of the United States (2009–2017), former Senator from Illinois (2005–2008)

Federal politicians

- Cindy Axne, U.S. representative (IA-3)
- Abby Finkenauer, U.S. representative (IA-1)
- Amy Klobuchar, U.S. senator from Minnesota
- Dave Loebsack, U.S. representative (IA-2)

Statewide politicians

- Patty Judge, former lieutenant governor of Iowa, former Iowa secretary of agriculture and nominee for U.S. Senate in 2016
- Rob Sand, Iowa state auditor

State senators

- Joe Bolkcom, state senator, District 43
- Chris Brase, former state senator, District 46
- Tom Courtney, former state senator, District 44
- Bob Dvorsky, former state senator, District 37
- Kevin Kinney, state senator, District 39
- Jim Lykam, state senator, District 45
- Rich Taylor, state senator, District 42
- Zach Wahls, state senator, District 37

State representatives

- Wes Breckenridge, state representative, District 29
- Mary Gaskill, state representative, District 81
- David Jacoby, state representative, District 74
- Monica Kurth, state representative, District 89
- Mary Mascher, state representative, District 86
- Phil Miller, former state representative, District 82
- Amy Nielsen, state representative, District 77
- Sally Stutsman, former state representative, District 77
- Phyllis Thede, state representative, District 93
- Mary Wolfe, state representative, District 98
- Frank Wood, former state representative, District 92, and former State Senator, District 42

Local politicians

- Ken Croken, Scott County supervisor
- Cindy Drost, former Mahaska County recorder
- Bill Gluba, former mayor of Davenport
- Thom Hart, former mayor of Davenport
- Nasseem Hesler, former mayor of Keosauqua
- Rick Larkin, Lee County supervisor
- Rick Lincoln, Clinton County sheriff
- Janet Lyness, Johnson County attorney
- Megan Suhr, Knoxville city councillor
- Eric Van Lancker, Clinton County auditor

Party officials

- Sue Dvorsky, former chair of the Iowa Democratic Party

Organizations

- Democratic Congressional Campaign Committee
- EMILY's List
- End Citizens United
- Giffords PAC
- Human Rights Campaign
- League of Conservation Voters Action Fund
- NARAL Pro-Choice America

==== Results ====
2020 Iowa's 2nd congressional district Democratic primary results by county: Map legend: Hart—100%; Hart—≥90%

Democratic primary results
Party	Candidate	Votes	%
Democratic	Rita Hart	67,039	99.6
Write-in		271	0.4
Total votes		67,310	100.0

=== Republican primary ===
==== Candidates ====
===== Nominee =====
- Mariannette Miller-Meeks, state senator; nominee for this seat in 2008, 2010, and 2014

===== Defeated in primary =====
- Tim Borchardt, retail worker
- Steven Everly, electrician
- Rick Phillips, businessman
- Bobby Schilling, former U.S. representative from Illinois's 17th congressional district (2011–2013)

===== Withdrawn =====
- Thomas Kedley, mayor of Osceola

===== Declined =====
- Chris Cournoyer, state senator
- Bob Gallagher, mayor of Bettendorf
- Bobby Kaufmann, state representative
- Barbara Kniff-McCulla, CEO of KLK Construction and member of the National Women's Business Council
- Mark Lofgren, state senator
- Chris Peters, surgeon and nominee for Iowa's 2nd congressional district in 2016 and 2018
- Brad Randolph, mayor of Fort Madison
- Roby Smith, state senator

==== Endorsements ====
Mariannette Miller-Meeks

Federal officials

- Joni Ernst, U.S. senator from Iowa

Statewide politicians

- Terry Branstad, former governor of Iowa
- Mike Naig, Iowa Secretary of Agriculture
- Kim Reynolds, governor of Iowa

Organizations

- Maggie's List
Bobby Schilling

Federal politicians

- Jim Jordan, U.S. representative

==== Results ====
2020 Iowa's 2nd congressional district Republican primary results by county: Map legend: Miller-Meeks—70–80%; Miller-Meeks—60–70%; Miller-Meeks—50–60%; Miller-Meeks—40–50%; Miller-Meeks—30–40%; Schilling—40–50%; Schilling—50–60%

Republican primary results
Party	Candidate	Votes	%
Republican	Mariannette Miller-Meeks	23,052	47.6
Republican	Bobby Schilling	17,582	36.3
Republican	Steven Everly	2,806	5.8
Republican	Rick Phillips	2,444	5.1
Republican	Tim Borchardt	2,370	4.9
Write-in		161	0.3
Total votes		48,415	100.0

=== General election ===
==== Debate ====
2020 Iowa's 2nd congressional district debate
No.	Date	Host	Moderator	Link	Democratic	Republican
Key: P Participant A Absent N Not invited I Invited W Withdrawn						
Key: P Participant A Absent N Not invited I Invited W Withdrawn					Rita Hart	Mariannette Miller-Meeks
1	Oct. 8, 2020	The Gazette; KCRG-TV; KYOU-TV	Chris Earl; James Lynch		P	P

==== Predictions ====
Source	Ranking	As of
The Cook Political Report	Tossup	November 2, 2020
Inside Elections	Lean D	October 28, 2020
Sabato's Crystal Ball	Lean D	November 2, 2020
Politico	Tossup	September 8, 2020
Daily Kos	Lean D	September 25, 2020
RCP	Tossup	October 13, 2020
Niskanen	Likely D	July 26, 2020
The Economist	Likely D	October 2, 2020

==== Polling ====
Poll source	Date(s) administered	Sample size	Margin of error	Rita Hart (D)	Mariannette Miller-Meeks (R)	Other/ Undecided
Monmouth University	October 15–20, 2020	355 (RV)	± 5.2%	49%	43%	8% (Note: "Other" and "No one" with 1%; Undecided with 6%)
Monmouth University	October 15–20, 2020	355 (LV)	± 5.2%	51%	42%	–
Monmouth University	October 15–20, 2020	355 (LV)	± 5.2%	54%	41%	–
Monmouth University	July 25 – August 3, 2020	374 (RV)	± 5.1%	47%	44%	9%
Monmouth University	July 25 – August 3, 2020	374 (LV)	± 5.1%	44%	48%	8%
Monmouth University	July 25 – August 3, 2020	374 (LV)	± 5.1%	45%	48%	7% (Note: "Other/none" with 1%; Undecided with 6%)
Harper Polling (R) (Note: Poll conducted for the Congressional Leadership Fund.)	July 26–28, 2020	406 (LV)	± 4.9%	41%	41%	16%

Hypothetical polling

with Generic Democrat and Generic Republican

Poll source	Date(s) administered	Sample size	Margin of error	Generic Democrat	Generic Republican	Other	Undecided
Selzer & Co./Des Moines Register	October 26–29, 2020	– (LV)	± 6.9%	40%	41%	11% (Note: "Refused" with 5%; "Someone else" with 4%; would not vote with 2%)	8%
Selzer and Co./Des Moines Register	September 14–17, 2020	– (LV) (Note: Not yet released; IA-02 subsample of statewide sample of 658)	± 8.7%	50%	46%	–	–
Selzer and Co./Des Moines Register	June 7–10, 2020	– (LV) (Note: Not yet released; IA-02 subsample of statewide sample of 674)	<= ± 7.7%	53%	35%	–	–
Selzer and Co./Des Moines Register	March 2–5, 2020	– (LV) (Note: Not yet released; IA-02 subsample of statewide sample of 667)	–	41%	49%	–	–

==== Results ====
Iowa's 2nd congressional district, 2020
Party	Candidate	Votes	%
Republican	Mariannette Miller-Meeks	196,964	49.912
Democratic	Rita Hart	196,958	49.910
Write-in		703	0.178
Total votes		394,625	100.0
Republican gain from Democratic			

Republican Mariannette Miller-Meeks was state-certified as the winner over Democrat Rita Hart on November 30 by an extremely narrow margin of 6 votes. On December 2, Hart announced that she would contest the election with the House Administration Committee under the 1969 Federal Contested Elections Act. On December 30, House Speaker Nancy Pelosi announced Miller-Meeks would be seated provisionally on January 3, 2021, with the rest of the incoming new Congress members. Republicans sharply criticized Pelosi's decision to review the race in the House Administration Committee, calling it an attempt to steal the election. It was also criticized by moderate Democrats, who argued it was hypocritical to overturn a certified state election after criticizing attempts to overturn the results of the 2020 presidential election. Hart withdrew her challenge on March 31, 2021. This was the closest House race in 2020 and one of the closest House races in a century.

== District 3 ==
2020 Iowa's 3rd congressional district election
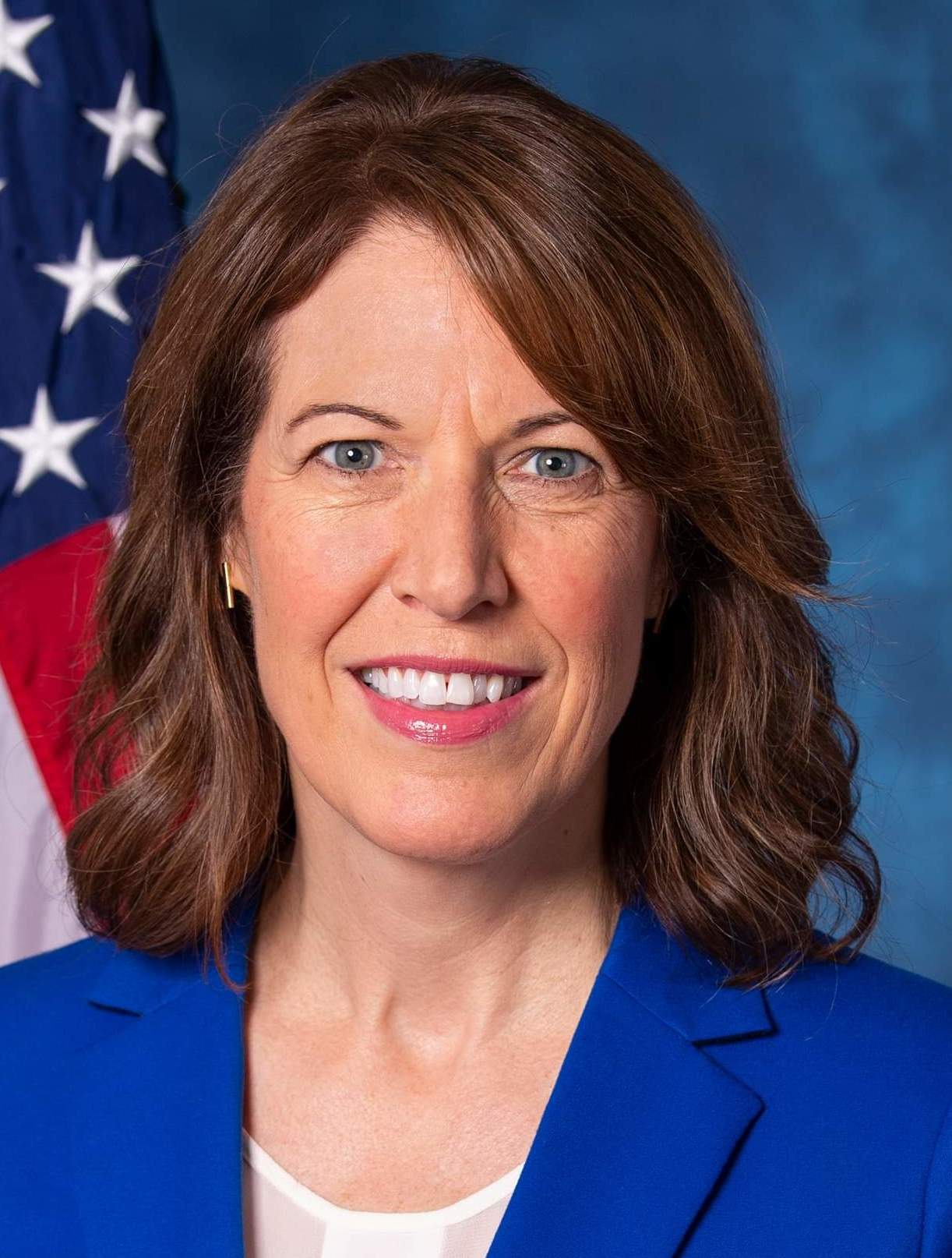

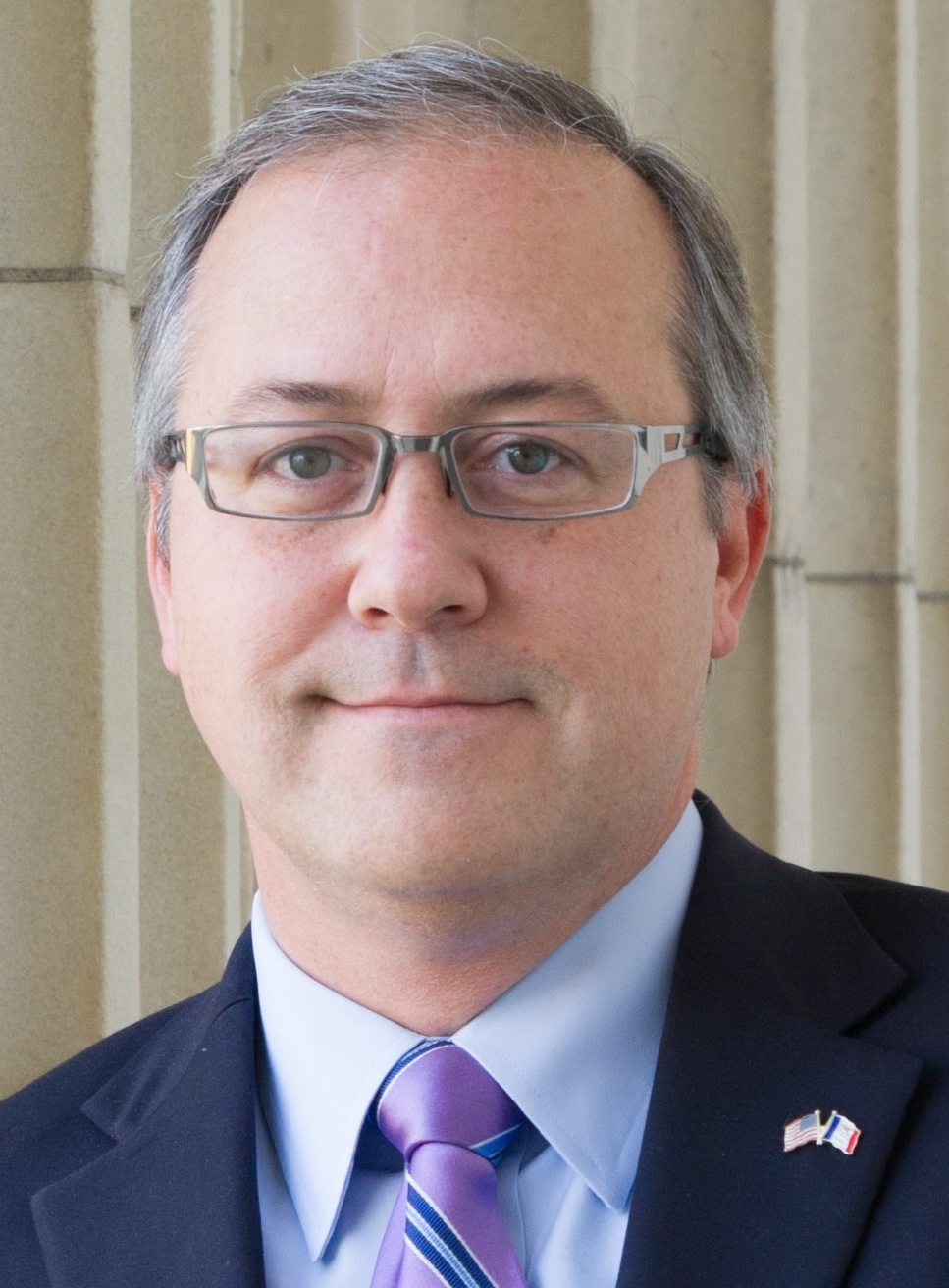
Nominee	Cindy Axne	David Young
Party	Democratic	Republican
Popular vote	219,205	212,997
Percentage	48.9%	47.6%
- County results Axne: 50–60% Young: 50–60% 60–70% 70–80%
U.S. Representative before election
Cindy Axne
Democratic
Elected U.S. Representative
Cindy Axne
Democratic

The 3rd district encompasses southwestern Iowa, stretching from Des Moines to the state's borders with Nebraska and Missouri. The incumbent was Democrat Cindy Axne, who flipped the district and was elected with 49.3% of the vote in 2018.

=== Democratic primary ===
==== Candidates ====
===== Nominee =====
- Cindy Axne, incumbent U.S. representative

==== Results ====
Democratic primary results
Party	Candidate	Votes	%
Democratic	Cindy Axne (incumbent)	76,681	99.2
Write-in		623	0.8
Total votes		77,304	100.0

=== Republican primary ===
==== Candidates ====
===== Nominee =====
- David Young, former U.S. representative

===== Defeated in primary =====
- Bill Schafer, U.S. Army veteran

===== Declined =====
- Jon Jacobsen, state representative
- Zach Nunn, state senator
- Brad Zaun, state senator

==== Results ====
2020 Iowa's 3rd congressional district Republican primary results by county: Map legend: Young—70–80%; Young—60–70%; Young—50–60%

Republican primary results
Party	Candidate	Votes	%
Republican	David Young	39,103	69.5
Republican	Bill Schafer	16,904	30.1
Write-in		227	0.4
Total votes		56,234	100.0

=== Third parties ===
==== Candidates ====
- Bryan Jack Holder (Libertarian)

=== General election ===
==== Predictions ====
Source	Ranking	As of
The Cook Political Report	Lean D	November 2, 2020
Inside Elections	Lean D	October 28, 2020
Sabato's Crystal Ball	Lean D	November 2, 2020
Politico	Lean D	November 2, 2020
Daily Kos	Lean D	October 15, 2020
RCP	Tossup	October 13, 2020
Niskanen	Lean D	July 26, 2020
The Economist	Lean D	October 2, 2020

==== Polling ====
Poll source	Date(s) administered	Sample size	Margin of error	Cindy Axne (D)	David Young (R)	Bryan Holder (L)	Other/ Undecided
Monmouth University	October 15–20, 2020	426 (RV)	± 4.8%	52%	43%	–	2% (Note: "Other" with 0%; Undecided with 2%)
Monmouth University	October 15–20, 2020	426 (LV)	± 4.8%	53%	42%	–	–
Monmouth University	October 15–20, 2020	426 (LV)	± 4.8%	55%	41%	–	–
Monmouth University	July 25 – August 3, 2020	507 (RV)	± 4.4%	48%	42%	2%	8%
Monmouth University	July 25 – August 3, 2020	507 (LV)	± 4.4%	50%	42%	–	8% (Note: "Holder (L)/Other" with 3%; Undecided with 5%)
Monmouth University	July 25 – August 3, 2020	507 (LV)	± 4.4%	52%	41%	–	7% (Note: "Holder (L)/Other" with 2%; Undecided with 5%)
The Tarrance Group (R)	July 7–9, 2020	400 (LV)	± 4.9%	43%	44%	6%	7% (Note: Undecided with 7%)
The Tarrance Group (R)	March 10–12, 2020	400 (LV)	± 4.9%	48%	48%	–	5% (Note: Undecided with 5%)

Hypothetical polling

with Generic Democrat and Generic Republican

Poll source	Date(s) administered	Sample size	Margin of error	Generic Democrat	Generic Republican	Other	Undecided
Selzer & Co./Des Moines Register	October 26–29, 2020	– (LV)	± 6.6%	45%	39%	8% (Note: "Refused" with 4%; "Someone else" with 3%; would not vote with 1%)	9%
Selzer and Co./Des Moines Register	September 14–17, 2020	– (LV) (Note: Not yet released; IA-03 subsample of statewide sample of 658)	± 7.7%	48%	42%	–	–
Selzer and Co./Des Moines Register	June 7–10, 2020	– (LV) (Note: Not yet released; IA-03 subsample of statewide sample of 674)	<= ± 7.7%	52%	36%	–	–
Selzer and Co./Des Moines Register	March 2–5, 2020	– (LV) (Note: Not yet released; IA-03 subsample of statewide sample of 667)	–	42%	43%	–	–

==== Results ====
Iowa's 3rd congressional district, 2020
Party	Candidate	Votes	%
Democratic	Cindy Axne (incumbent)	219,205	48.9
Republican	David Young	212,997	47.6
Libertarian	Bryan Jack Holder	15,361	3.4
Write-in		384	0.1
Total votes		447,947	100.0
Democratic hold			

== District 4 ==
2020 Iowa's 4th congressional district election
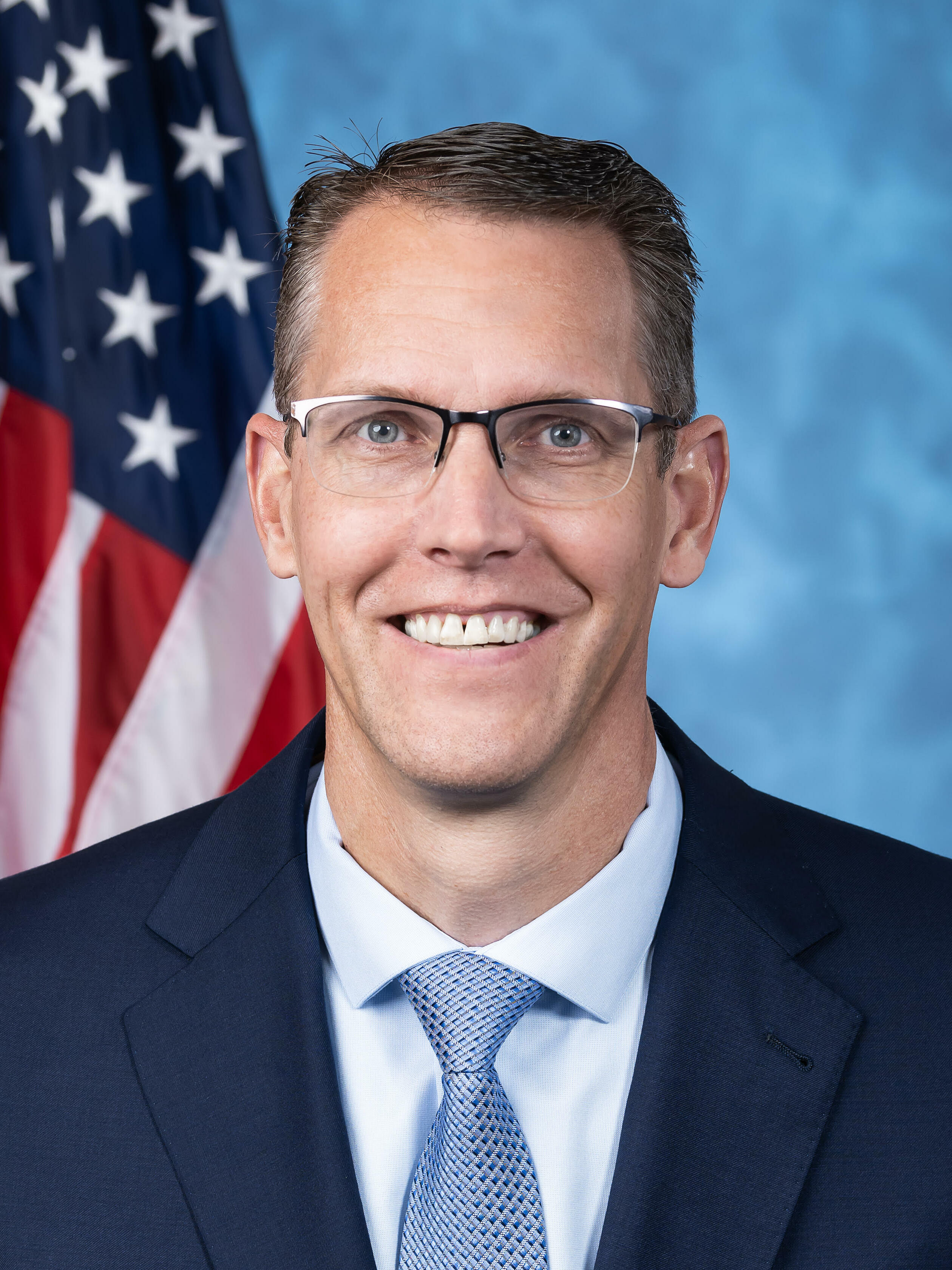

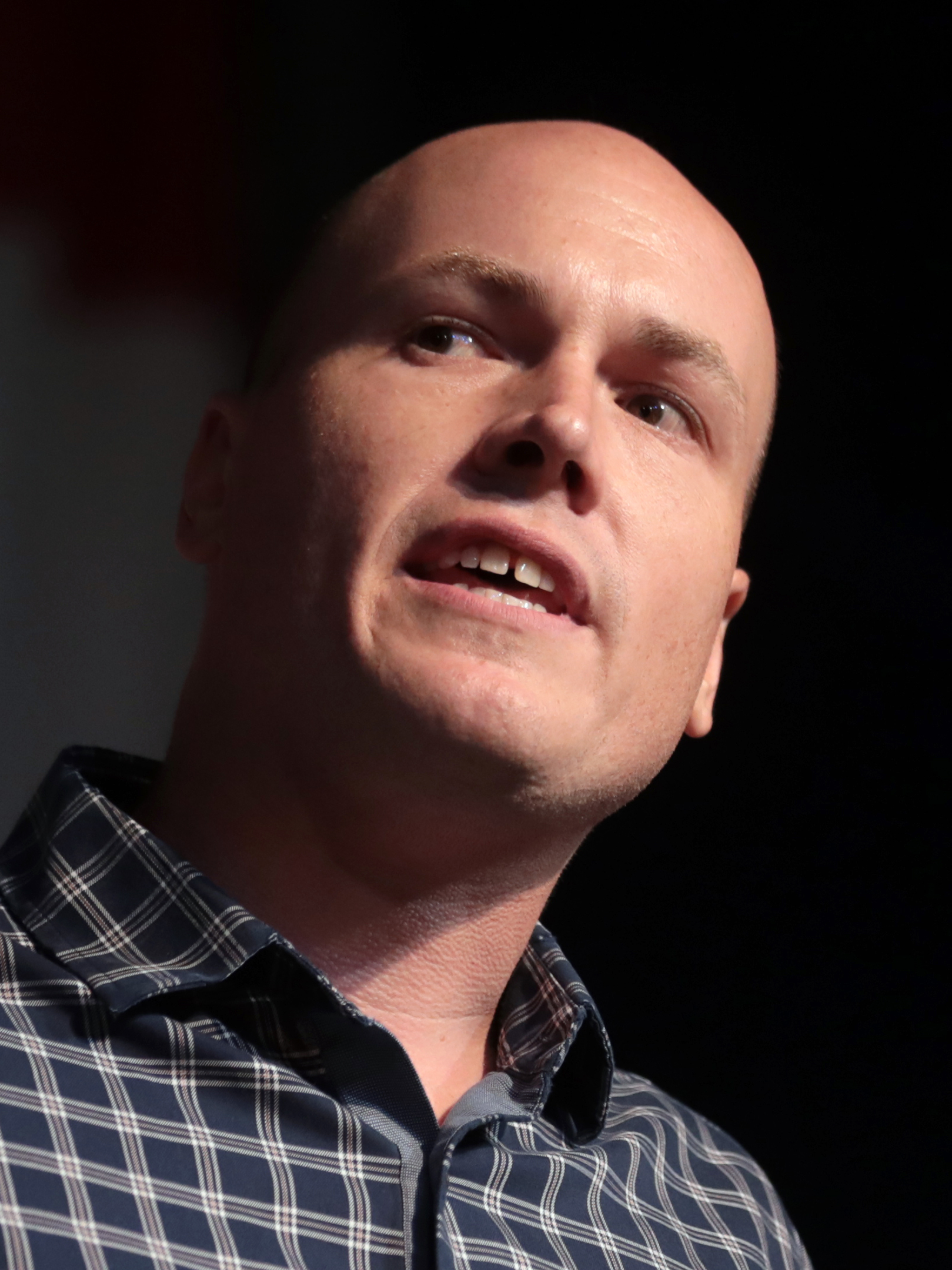
Nominee	Randy Feenstra	J. D. Scholten
Party	Republican	Democratic
Popular vote	237,369	144,761
Percentage	62.0%	37.8%
- County results Feenstra: 50–60% 60–70% 70–80% 80–90% Scholten: 50–60%
U.S. Representative before election
Steve King
Republican
Elected U.S. Representative
Randy Feenstra
Republican

The 4th district is based in northwestern Iowa, including Sioux City, Ames, Mason City, Fort Dodge, Boone and Carroll. The incumbent was Republican Steve King, who had been re-elected with 50.3% of the vote in 2018.

=== Republican primary ===
==== Candidates ====
===== Nominee =====
- Randy Feenstra, state senator

===== Defeated in primary =====
- Steve King, incumbent U.S. representative
- Steve Reeder, businessman
- Bret Richards, U.S. Army veteran and former businessman
- Jeremy Taylor, Woodbury County supervisor and former state representative

===== Declined =====
- Rick Bertrand, state senator and candidate for Iowa's 4th congressional district in 2016
- Cyndi Hanson, candidate for Iowa's 4th congressional district in 2018
- Chris McGowan, president of the Siouxland Chamber of Commerce
- Rick Sanders, Story County supervisor
- Linda Upmeyer, Speaker of the Iowa House of Representatives

==== Endorsements ====
Randy Feenstra

State senators

- Annette Sweeney, state senator, District 25

State representatives

- Dan Huseman, state representative, District 3
- Megan Jones, state representative, District 2
- Tim Kraayenbrink, state representative, District 5

Individuals

- Ben Shapiro, conservative commentator and host of The Daily Wire
- Bob Vander Plaats, president and CEO of The Family Leader; candidate for governor of Iowa in 2002, 2006 and 2010; nominee for lieutenant governor of Iowa in 2006

Organizations

- Republican Jewish Coalition
- Republican Main Street Partnership PAC
- U.S. Chamber of Commerce

Newspapers

- Sioux City Journal
Steve King

State representatives

- Ralph Klemme, former state representative (District 3)

Individuals

- Sam Clovis, national co-chair of Donald Trump's 2016 presidential campaign, candidate for state treasurer of Iowa in 2014

==== Polling ====
Poll source	Date(s) administered	Sample size	Margin of error	Steve King	Randy Feenstra	Steve Reeder	Jeremy Taylor	Other	Undecided
Public Opinion Strategies (R) (Note: American Future Fund is a PAC supporting Randy Feenstra)	May 16–18, 2020	400 (V)	± 4.9%	39%	41%	1%	4%	3% (Note: Richards with 3%)	–
Public Opinion Strategies (R)	May 16–18, 2020	400 (V)	± 4.9%	41% (Note: If only King and Feenstra were candidates)	48%	–	–	–	–
American Viewpoint (Note: Poll sponsored by Feenstra's campaign)	May 7–8, 2020	350 (LV)	± 5.2%	39%	36%	–	–	9% (Note: "Another candidate" with 9%)	10%
American Viewpoint	April 27–29, 2020	400 (LV)	± 4.9%	41%	34%	–	–	8% (Note: "Another candidate" with 8%)	15%
American Viewpoint	January 27–29, 2020	– (V)	–	53%	22%	–	–	–	–
G1 Survey Research	October 1–3, 2019	400 (LV)	± 4.89%	59%	15%	6%	0%	2% (Note: Bret Richards with 2%)	17%
G1 Survey Research	October 1–3, 2019	400 (LV)	± 4.89%	64% (Note: If respondents had to choose between the two candidates for which percentages are listed)	24%	–	–	–	12% (Note: "Undecided/don't know/refused" with 12%)
G1 Survey Research	October 1–3, 2019	400 (LV)	± 4.89%	64%	–	–	19%	–	17% (Note: "Undecided/don't know/refused" with 17%)

==== Results ====
Republican primary results by county: Feenstra: 30–40%; 40–50%; 50–60%; 60–70%; 80–90%; King: 30–40%; 40–50%; 50–60%

Republican primary results
Party	Candidate	Votes	%
Republican	Randy Feenstra	37,329	45.5
Republican	Steve King (incumbent)	29,366	35.9
Republican	Jeremy Taylor	6,418	7.8
Republican	Bret Richards	6,140	7.5
Republican	Steve Reeder	2,528	3.1
Write-in		176	0.2
Total votes		81,957	100.0

=== Democratic primary ===
==== Candidates ====
===== Nominee =====
- J. D. Scholten, former paralegal, former professional baseball player, and nominee for Iowa's 4th congressional district in 2018

==== Endorsements ====
J.D. Scholten

Organizations

- League of Conservation Voters Action Fund
- Sierra Club

==== Results ====
2020 Iowa's 4th congressional district Democratic primary results by county: Map legend: Scholten—100%; Scholten—≥90%

Democratic primary results
Party	Candidate	Votes	%
Democratic	J. D. Scholten	46,370	99.6
Write-in		166	0.4
Total votes		46,536	100.0

=== General election ===
==== Predictions ====
Source	Ranking	As of
The Cook Political Report	Safe R	November 2, 2020
Inside Elections	Safe R	October 16, 2020
Sabato's Crystal Ball	Safe R	October 15, 2020
Politico	Likely R	November 2, 2020
Daily Kos	Safe R	October 15, 2020
RCP	Lean R	October 13, 2020
Niskanen	Likely R	July 26, 2020
The Economist	Likely R	October 2, 2020

==== Polling ====
Poll source	Date(s) administered	Sample size	Margin of error	Randy Feenstra (R)	J.D. Scholten (D)	Other/ Undecided
Monmouth University	October 15–20, 2020	414 (RV)	± 4.8%	48%	42%	10% (Note: "Other" and "No one" with 2%; Undecided with 6%)
Monmouth University	October 15–20, 2020	414 (LV)	± 4.8%	48%	43%	–
Monmouth University	October 15–20, 2020	414 (LV)	± 4.8%	47%	44%	–
Change Research (D) (Note: Poll sponsored by Scholten's campaign.)	October 13–15, 2020	603 (LV)	± 4%	50%	45%	–
American Viewpoint (R)	October 6–8, 2020	400 (LV)	± 5.0%	54%	31%	11% (Note: Undecided with 11%)
Monmouth University	July 25 – August 3, 2020	374 (RV)	± 5.1%	54%	34%	12% (Note: "Other/none" with 4%; Undecided with 8%)
Monmouth University	July 25 – August 3, 2020	374 (LV)	± 5.1%	55%	34%	10% (Note: "Other/none" with 3%; Undecided with 7%)
Monmouth University	July 25 – August 3, 2020	374 (LV)	± 5.1%	56%	33%	10%

Hypothetical polling

with Steve King and J.D. Scholten

Poll source	Date(s) administered	Sample size	Margin of error	Steve King (R)	J.D. Scholten (D)	Undecided
20 Insight (D) (Note: Poll sponsored by Majority Rules PAC)	January 16–17, 2019	472 (LV)	± 4.5%	39%	44%	17%

with Steve King and Generic Democrat

Poll source	Date(s) administered	Sample size	Margin of error	Steve King (R)	Generic Democrat	Undecided
20/20 Insight (D)	January 16–17, 2019	472 (LV)	± 4.5%	37%	45%	18%

with Generic Republican and Generic Democrat

Poll source	Date(s) administered	Sample size	Margin of error	Generic Republican	Generic Democrat	Other	Undecided
Selzer & Co./Des Moines Register	October 26–29, 2020	– (LV)	± 6.9%	50%	33%	10% (Note: "Refused" with 4%; "Someone else" and would not vote with 3%)	8%
Selzer and Co./Des Moines Register	September 14–17, 2020	– (LV) (Note: Not yet released; IA-04 subsample of statewide sample of 658)	± 7.5%	49%	44%	–	–
Selzer and Co./Des Moines Register	June 7–10, 2020	– (LV) (Note: Not yet released; IA-04 subsample of statewide sample of 674)	<= ± 7.7%	57%	35%	–	–
Selzer and Co./Des Moines Register	March 2–5, 2020	– (LV) (Note: Not yet released; IA-04 subsample of statewide sample of 667)	–	51%	40%	–	–

==== Results ====
Iowa's 4th congressional district, 2020
Party	Candidate	Votes	%
Republican	Randy Feenstra	237,369	62.0
Democratic	J. D. Scholten	144,761	37.8
Write-in		892	0.2
Total votes		383,022	100.0
Republican hold			

== See also ==
- 2020 Iowa elections

== Notes ==
Partisan clients
