= Rita Hart =

American politician

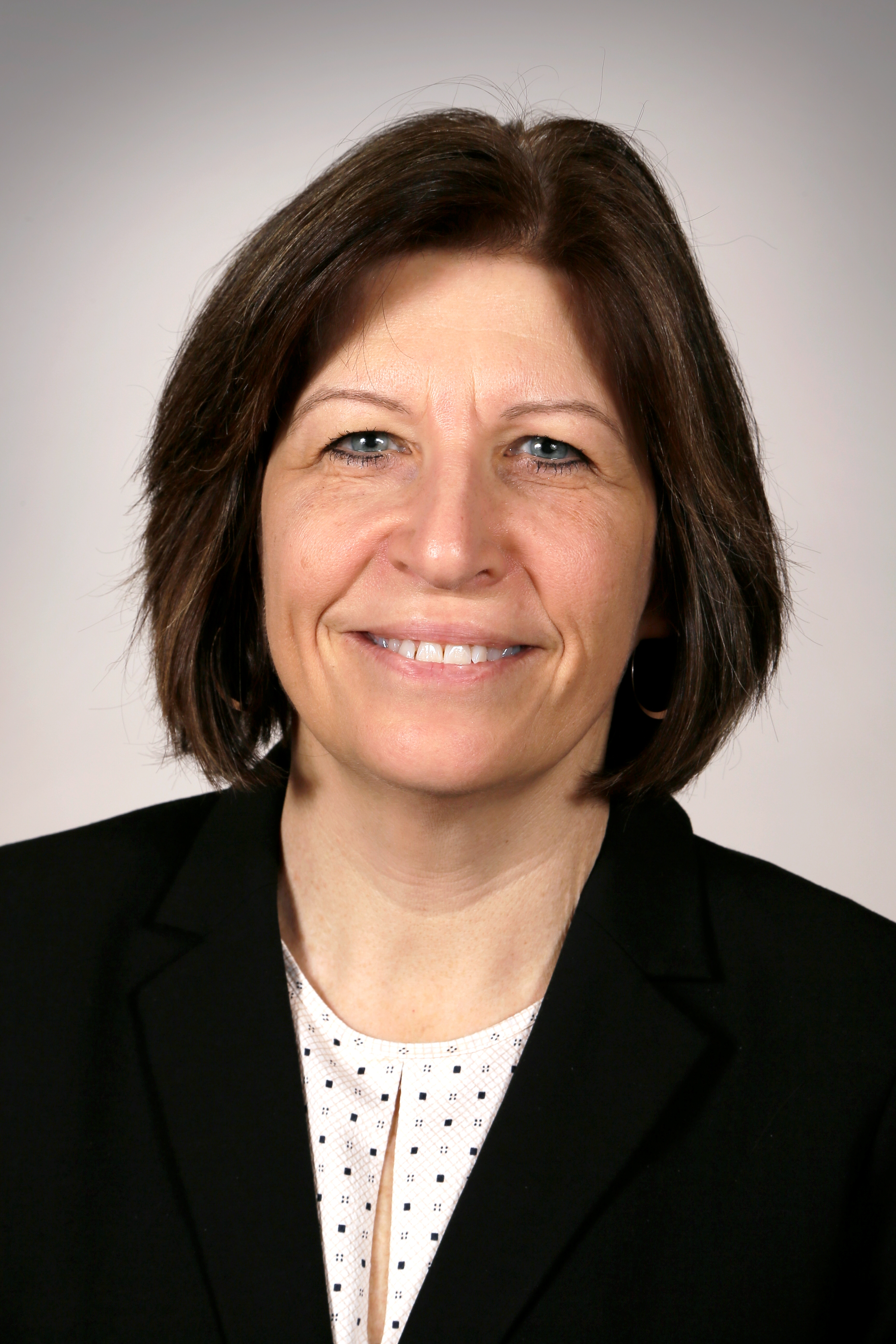
- Hart in 2015

Chair of the Iowa Democratic Party
- Incumbent
- Assumed office January 29, 2023
- Preceded by: Ross Wilburn

Member of the Iowa Senate from the 49th district
- In office January 14, 2013 – January 14, 2019
- Preceded by: Hubert Houser
- Succeeded by: Chris Cournoyer

Personal details
- Born: May 5, 1956 (age 70) Charles City, Iowa, U.S.
- Party: Democratic
- Spouse: Paul Hart
- Children: 5
- Education: North Iowa Area Community College (AA); University of Northern Iowa (BA); University of Iowa (MA)

Rita Hart (born May 5, 1956) is an American politician and retired educator who served as an Iowa State Senator from the 49th district from 2013 to 2019. She is a member of the Democratic Party. In the 2018 gubernatorial election, Hart ran for lieutenant governor of Iowa on the Democratic ticket, with running mate Fred Hubbell.

Hart was her party's nominee in the 2020 election for Iowa's 2nd congressional district. Hart's opponent, Republican physician Mariannette Miller-Meeks, was certified as the winner by six votes, one of the closest federal elections in U.S. history. Hart opted to bypass the Iowa state court system and contest the election via a petition with the House Administration Committee under the 1969 Federal Contested Elections Act, which sets forth procedures for contesting state election results directly through the House of Representatives. Speaker of the United States House of Representatives Nancy Pelosi provisionally seated Miller-Meeks on January 3, 2021, at the opening of the 117th Congress, pending the House's adjudication of Hart's petition to overturn the results of the race, but on March 31, 2021, Hart withdrew her challenge.

On January 29, 2023, Hart was elected chair of the Iowa Democratic Party.

== Early life and education ==
Hart was born in Charles City, Iowa. She earned an associate degree from North Iowa Area Community College, a Bachelor of Arts from the University of Northern Iowa, and a Master of Arts from the University of Iowa.

== Career ==
Before entering politics, Hart worked as a public school teacher at Bennett Community School in Bennett, Iowa, and in the Calamus–Wheatland Community School District. She and her husband also own and operate a farm.

Hart served on the Senate Agriculture, Economic Growth, Education, Local Government, and Veterans Affairs committees. She also served on the Economic Development Appropriations Subcommittee, as well as the International Relations Committee, the Local Government Mandates Study Committee, the Recycling Policy Study Committee, the Early Childhood Iowa State Board, the Economic Development Authority Board, the Human Rights Board, the Prevention of Disabilities Policy Council, and the Watershed Improvement Review Board.

On June 16, 2018, Fred Hubbell announced that Hart would join the Democratic ticket as the nominee for lieutenant governor in the 2018 Iowa gubernatorial election. Hubbell and Hart lost the election to Republican nominee Kim Reynolds.

== 2020 Iowa's 2nd congressional district election ==
On May 14, 2019, Hart announced her candidacy for Iowa's 2nd congressional district in the 2020 election. She was unopposed in the June 2 Democratic primary election, and the next day released a list of 20 Republicans who supported her campaign, one of a number of Democrats making similar announcements during the 2020 United States elections. She faced Republican state senator Mariannette Miller-Meeks in the November general election.

The 2020 election for Iowa's 2nd congressional district was the closest federal election in the U.S. that year; the 2nd closest US House Race by percentage in American history, behind only the tied race for Pennsylvania's 2nd District seat in 1826, and the closest election by vote margin since the 1984 race for Indiana's 8th District. On November 30, following a recount, the Iowa Board of Canvass voted 5-0 to certify Miller-Meeks as the winner by six votes (196,964 to 196,958). Hart challenged the results through a petition with the House Administration Committee under the 1969 Federal Contested Elections Act, which sets forth procedures for contesting state election results. Under the Constitution, each chamber of Congress is "the judge of the elections, returns and qualifications of its own members."

Hart's petition contended that the House should count certain ballots that were not included in the recount. In her petition she contended that 22 legally cast ballots were unlawfully excluded, and two, that the 24 counties' recount boards' procedures were irregular across the district. Had they been counted, she argued she would have won the race by nine votes. These uncounted ballots were excluded for a variety of reasons including errors in the canvasing, signatures in the wrong place, envelopes that were improperly sealed and other errors in voting and counting.

House Speaker Nancy Pelosi provisionally seated Miller-Meeks on January 3, 2021, pending adjudication of Hart's petition.

In response to a letter containing questions from House Administration Committee Chair Zoe Lofgren, Hart and her attorney Marc Elias wrote, "Where necessary to effectuate the will of the voters of the Second Congressional District, the Committee should therefore exercise its discretion to depart from Iowa law, and adopt counting rules that 'disenfranchise the smallest possible number of voters.'" Republicans and some Democrats sharply criticized Pelosi's decision to review the race in the House Administration Committee, calling it an attempt to steal the election. They argued that it was hypocritical to overturn a certified state election after criticizing Republican attempts to overturn the results of the 2020 presidential election.

On March 31, 2021, in a surprise announcement, Rita Hart withdrew her challenge to the results in Iowa’s 2nd Congressional District, citing a “toxic campaign of political disinformation”, thus ending her campaign. Her contest was subsequently dismissed and Miller-Meeks was sworn in non-provisionally for the seat.

== Personal life ==
Hart and her husband, Paul, have five children. They reside in Wheatland, Iowa.

== Electoral history ==
=== 2012 ===
2012 Iowa Senate 49th district election
Party	Candidate	Votes	%
Democratic	Rita Hart	17,305	54.6%
Republican	Andrew Naeve	14,398	45.4%
Democratic gain from Republican			

=== 2014 ===
2014 Iowa Senate 49th district election
Party	Candidate	Votes	%
Democratic	Rita Hart (incumbent)	11,690	52%
Republican	Brian Schmidt	10,808	48%
Democratic hold			

=== 2020 ===
Iowa's 2nd congressional district, 2020
Party	Candidate	Votes	%
Republican	Mariannette Miller-Meeks	196,864	49.910
Democratic	Rita Hart	196,858	49.908
Total votes		394,439	100.0
Republican gain from Democratic			

Party political offices
Preceded by Monica Vernon	Democratic nominee for Lieutenant Governor of Iowa; 2018	Succeeded by Eric Van Lancker
Preceded by Ross Wilburn	Chair of the Iowa Democratic Party; 2023–present	Incumbent
