= Cathy Glasson =

2018 candidate for Iowa governor

- Born: 1958 (age 67–68); Spencer, Iowa, United States
- Occupations: Union President and Registered Nurse
- Known for: Gubernatorial candidate in Iowa

Cathy Glasson is an American nurse, union leader, and former candidate for Governor of Iowa, who ran in the 2018 Democratic primary. She is president of SEIU Local 199 in Iowa and has received support from the union. Glasson lost the primary to businessman Fred Hubbell, receiving 20.5% of the vote to Hubbell's 55.5%.

She ran on policies for raising the minimum wage and a Medicare for All plan.
