= Lisa Heddens =

American politician (born 1964)

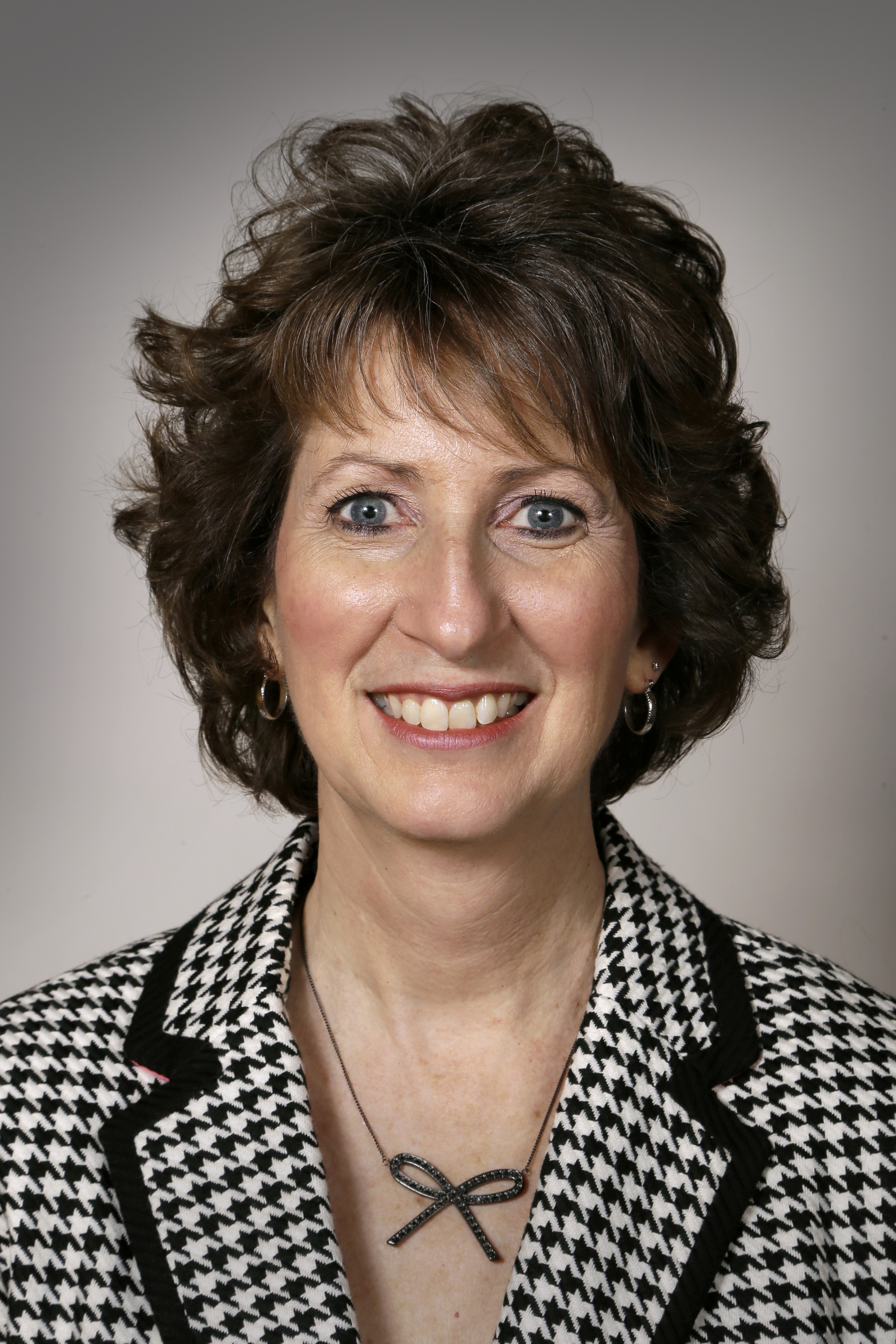

Member of the Iowa House of Representatives from the 46th district
- In office January 13, 2003 – January 2019
- Preceded by: Teresa Garman
- Succeeded by: Ross Wilburn

Personal details
- Born: June 6, 1964 (age 62) Rochester, Minnesota, U.S.
- Party: Democratic
- Spouse: Jeffrey dv 2014; married John Mageli 2019-Present
- Children: 2
- Education: Iowa State University (BS)
- Website: legis.iowa.gov/...
- Story County, IA Supervisor 2019 - Present

Lisa Heddens (born June 6, 1964) is an American politician who served as a member of the Iowa House of Representatives from 2003 to 2019.

== Early life and education ==
Heddens was born in Rochester, Minnesota. She received her Bachelor of Science degree and a teaching certificate from Iowa State University.

== Career ==
Heddens served as ranking member on the House Health and Human Services Appropriations subcommittee. She was also assistant minority leader in the House. Heddens was re-elected in 2006 with 8,371 votes (63%), defeating Republican John Griswold and Libertarian Eric Cooper.

== Personal life ==
Heddens's husband, Jeff, works for the Iowa Department of Public Defense. They have two children.

Iowa House of Representatives
| Preceded by Teresa Garman | 46th District; 2003–present | Succeeded by Incumbent |
