= Mariannette Miller-Meeks =

American physician and politician (born 1955)

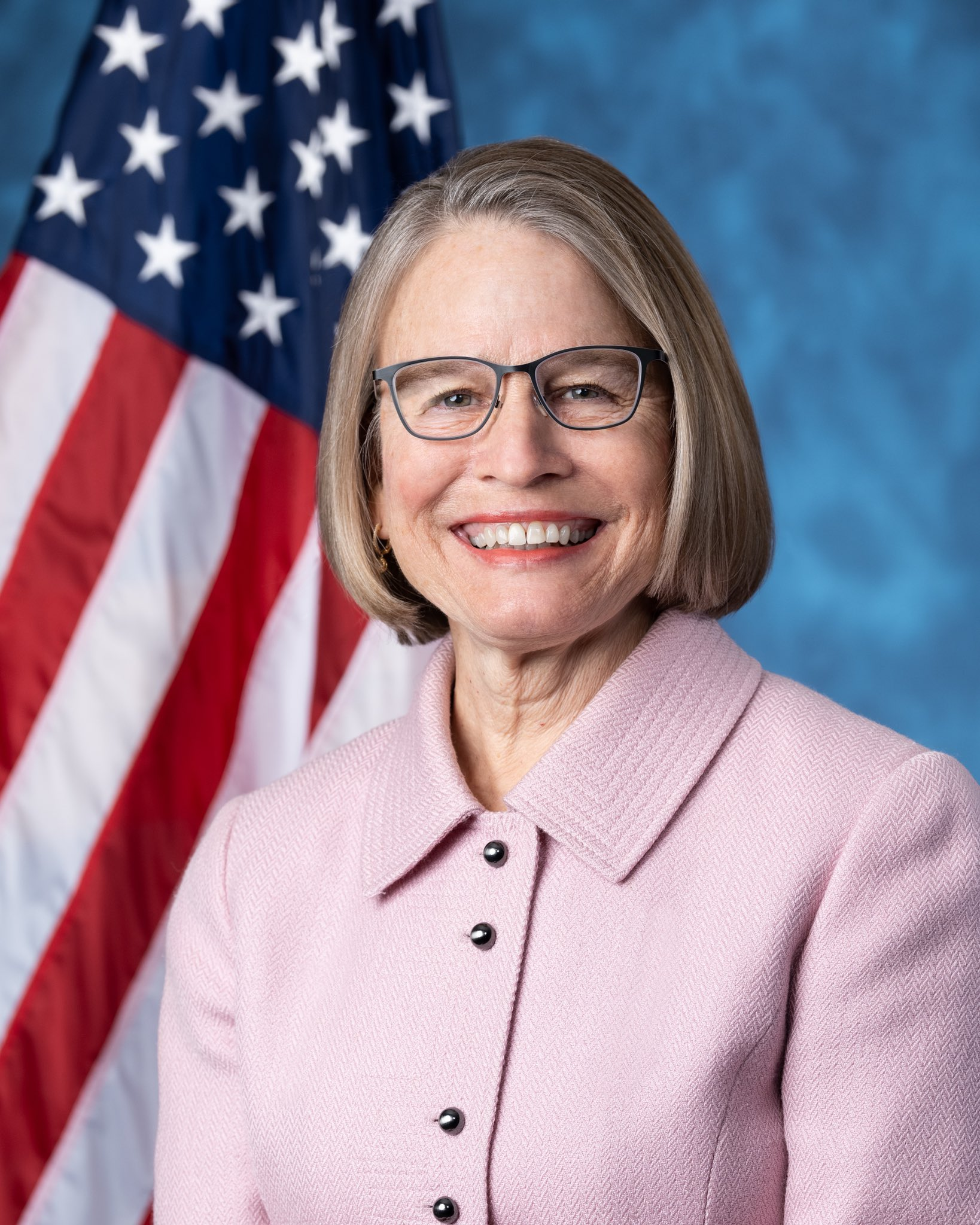
- Official portrait, 2020

Member of the U.S. House of Representatives from Iowa
- Incumbent
- Assumed office January 3, 2021
- Preceded by: Dave Loebsack
- Constituency: 2nd district (2021–2023); 1st district (2023–present)

Member of the Iowa Senate from the 41st district
- In office January 14, 2019 – January 2, 2021
- Preceded by: Mark Chelgren
- Succeeded by: Adrian Dickey

Director of the Iowa Department of Public Health
- In office January 15, 2011 – January 9, 2014
- Governor: Terry Branstad
- Preceded by: Tom Newton
- Succeeded by: Gerd Clabaugh

Personal details
- Born: Mariannette Jane Miller; September 6, 1955 (age 71) Herlong, California, U.S.
- Party: Republican
- Spouse: Curt Meeks (m. 1983)
- Children: 2
- Education: Texas Christian University (BSN); University of Southern California (MS); University of Texas, San Antonio (MD)
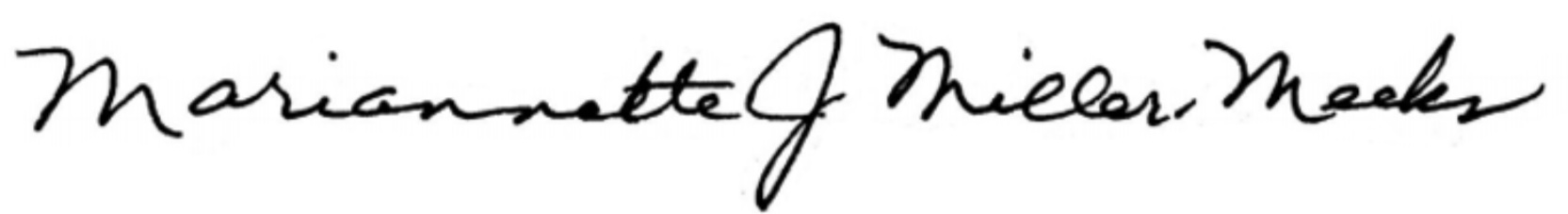
- Signature
- Website: House website Campaign website

Military service
- Branch/service: United States Army; Army Reserve
- Years of service: 1974–1982 (active); 1983–2000 (reserve)
- Rank: Lieutenant Colonel
- Unit: Army Medical Department

Mariannette Jane Miller-Meeks (née Miller; born September 6, 1955) is an American physician and politician who has served as a U.S. representative from Iowa since 2021. Her district, numbered the 2nd from 2021 to 2023 and the 1st since 2023, includes most of Iowa's southeastern quadrant, including Davenport, Bettendorf, Burlington, and Iowa City. Previously, Miller-Meeks served in the Iowa Senate from 2019 to 2021. She is a member of the Republican Party.

Miller-Meeks ran three unsuccessful campaigns for the U.S. House in 2008, 2010, and 2014. She ran again for the seat in 2020, winning by six votes (a margin of 0.002%). She was reelected in 2022 by a margin of nearly 7%, and was reelected in 2024 by a 0.29% margin after winning a closer-than-expected Republican primary. She lost re-election in 2026, in a rematch against Christina Bohannan.

She is a member of the moderate Republican Governance Group.

== Early life and education ==
Mariannette Jane Miller-Meeks was born in Herlong, California, on September 6, 1955. She earned a Bachelor of Science in nursing from Texas Christian University in 1976, a Master of Science in education from the University of Southern California in 1980, and a Doctor of Medicine from University of Texas Health Science Center at San Antonio in 1986.

== Career before politics ==
Miller-Meeks joined active duty in the United States Army in 1976, serving until 1982. Starting in 1983, she became a member of the United States Army Reserve and retired in 2000.

Miller-Meeks operated a private ophthalmology practice in Ottumwa, Iowa, until 2008. She served as the first female president of the Iowa Medical Society. She was the first woman in twenty years to be a faculty member of the University of Iowa's department of ophthalmology and visual sciences, and worked as a representative from Iowa to the American Academy of Ophthalmology.

In 2010, Republican Governor Terry Branstad appointed Miller-Meeks director of the Iowa Department of Public Health which she led until 2013; she resigned in 2014 to run for Congress.

== Iowa State Senate ==
When Mark Chelgren announced he was not running for reelection, Miller-Meeks ran for Iowa Senate, District 41 in 2018, defeating Democratic nominee Mary Stewart. Miller-Meeks served in the Iowa Senate from 2019 to 2020.

== U.S. House of Representatives ==
=== Elections ===
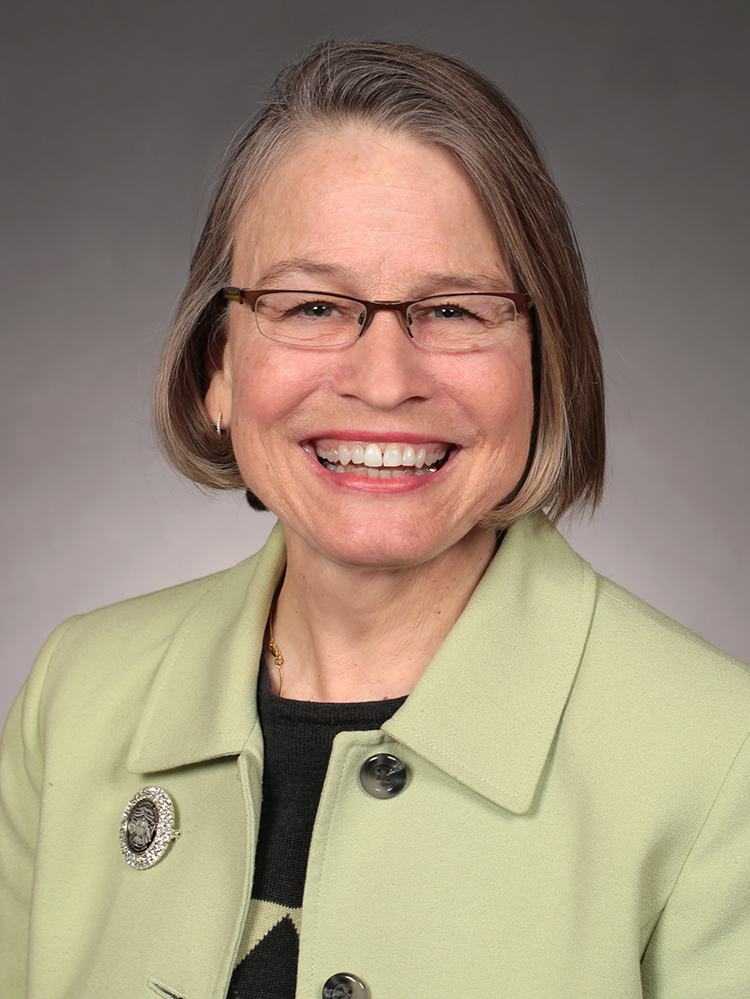
The then State Senator, Marinannette Miller-Meeks in 2019

==== 2008, 2010, 2014 ====
Miller-Meeks was the Republican nominee for Iowa's 2nd congressional district in 2008, 2010, and 2014, losing to Dave Loebsack in all three races.

In her 2014 campaign, Miller-Meeks opposed the Affordable Care Act (Obamacare). She also stated her opposition to legalized abortion except in cases of rape, incest, or harm to the mother. She opposed same-sex marriage. She criticized EPA regulation of waterways and coal plants, saying it creates uncertainty for farmers.

==== 2020 ====
Miller-Meeks ran to represent Iowa's 2nd congressional district again in 2020, following Loebsack's retirement. She won the June 2 Republican primary election, defeating former Illinois Congressman Bobby Schilling.

She faced the Democratic nominee, former state Senator Rita Hart, in the November general election. The initial count in the election showed Miller-Meeks with a 47 vote victory. Hart asked for a recount which shrunk the lead to just 6 votes, which was certified by the State Canvassing Board. Hart chose not to contest the results in the courts because there was insufficient time. The election was not certified until November 30 and election challenges in Iowa had to be completed by December 8.

Hart instead contested the certified result through a petition with the Committee on House Administration under the 1969 Federal Contested Elections Act, which sets forth procedures for contesting state election results in the House under the Constitution. In her petition, Hart contended that 22 legally cast votes were not counted. Had they been counted, per her petition, she would have won the race by nine votes. House Speaker Nancy Pelosi provisionally seated Miller-Meeks on January 3, 2021, pending adjudication of Hart's petition. The Committee on House Administration reviewed Hart's petition, and Pelosi claimed the House had the authority to expel Miller-Meeks, but on March 31, Hart withdrew her challenge.

During the campaign, which took place amid the COVID-19 pandemic, Miller-Meeks said she "practices social distancing, wears a mask in public and sanitizes her hands" but does not support face mask mandates.

==== 2022 ====
After redistricting, Miller-Meeks' district was renumbered as the 1st district, effective with the 2022 elections. Miller-Meeks defeated Democratic state Representative Christina Bohannan in the November 2022 general election by 53% to 47%.

==== 2024 ====
In 2024, Miller-Meeks again faced off against Christina Bohannan. The race was extremely close, with Miller-Meeks ahead by 801 votes after the initial count. A recount confirmed that Miller-Meeks had been elected to a third term by 799 votes.

==== 2026 ====
Miller-Meeks raised over $1 million in the first quarter of 2025. This was the most money raised by any U.S. House incumbent during this time period. In the 2026 election, Miller-Meeks faced a primary challenge from David Pautsch, who unsuccessfully sought the Republican nomination in Iowa's 1st District in 2024. Pautsch ran to the right of Miller-Meeks.

Miller-Meeks defeated Pautsch for the second time in the June Republican primary and faced Democratic nominee Christina Bohannan for a third consecutive general election in November. This resulted in a decisive loss for Miller-Meeks, by a margin of nearly 10 points.

=== Policies ===
==== American Rescue Plan Act of 2021 ====
Miller-Meeks, along with all other Republicans, both in the Senate and the House, voted against the American Rescue Plan Act of 2021.

==== Business ====
In April 2025, Miller-Meeks urged lawmakers to act to extend the qualified business income deduction a tax break that benefits small businesses and that was slated to expire at the end of the year.

==== Infrastructure ====
In 2020, Miller-Meeks said that an infrastructure bill would be her main priority, suggesting a fuel tax increase to pay for it.

==== Iran war ====
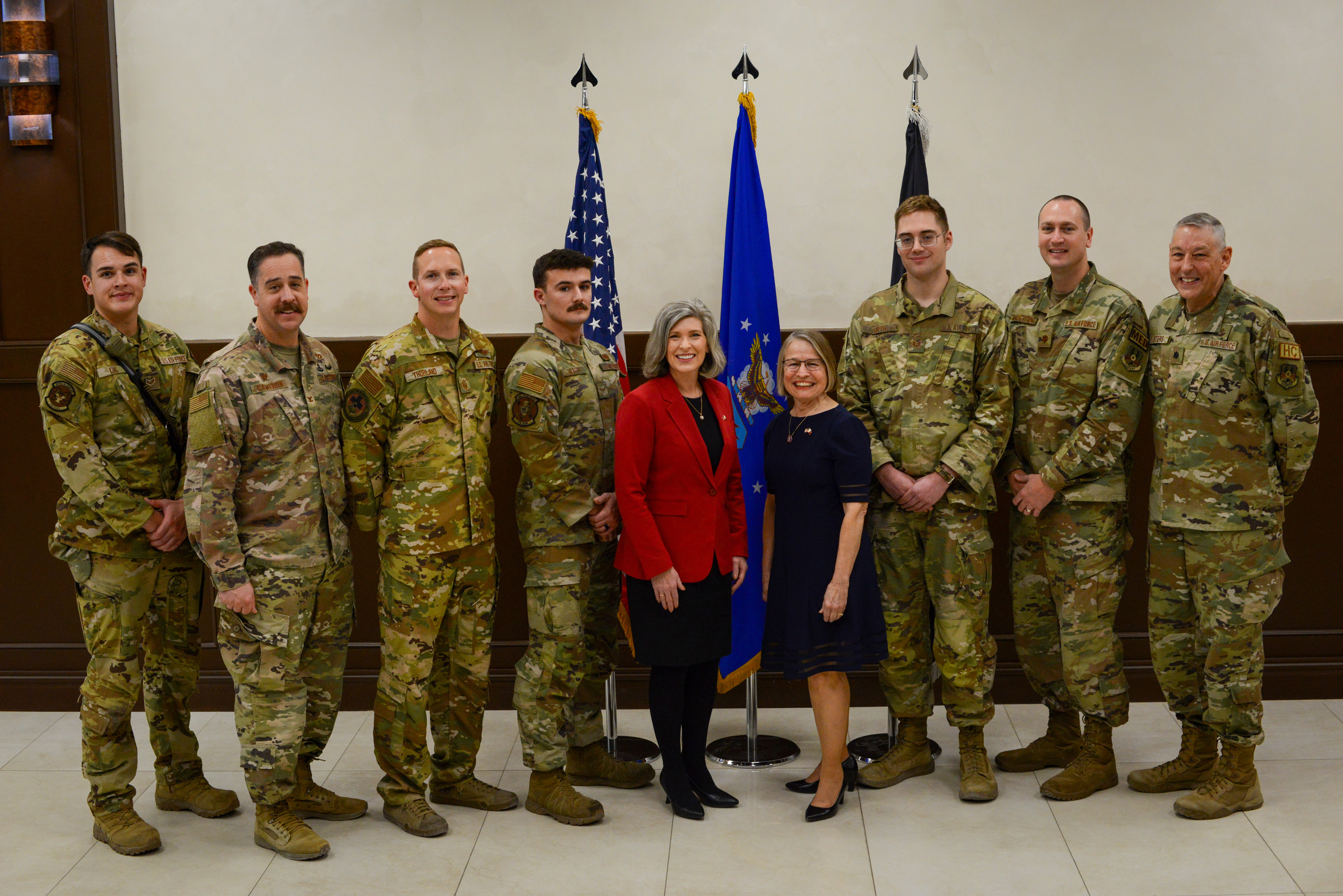
Miller-Meeks with Senator Joni Ernst visiting troops in the USCENTCOM area of responsibility.

In February 2026, Miller-Meeks commented on Trump's initial strikes in the 2026 Iran war. She said Iran was a sponsor of terrorism and that the world "cannot allow a nuclear-armed Iran". In March 2026, Miller-Meeks gave her condolences to families of American soldiers killed in the Iran war, and attended their dignified transfer events.

Miller-Meeks said in March 2026 that the war should "remain focused and limited", since Americans "rightfully do not want another forever war". In the first half of 2026, she voted three times against war powers resolutions that would have limited the war until congressional consent had been obtained, stating that it would "hamstring operations while pilots are in the air". In April 2026, Miller-Meeks said she would "look very carefully" at proposed spending cuts to fund the Iran war.

==== January 6 commission ====
On May 19, 2021, Miller-Meeks was among 35 Republicans who joined all Democrats in voting to approve legislation to establish the January 6 commission meant to investigate the storming of the U.S. Capitol.

==== LGBT rights ====
On February 25, 2021, Miller-Meeks voted against the Equality Act, before the United States House of Representatives, which would outlaw discrimination on the basis of sex, sexual orientation, and gender identity in the United States Code and effectively codify the decision of the Supreme Court of the United States in Bostock v. Clayton County.

On July 19, 2022, Miller-Meeks voted for the Respect for Marriage Act, before the United States House of Representatives, which would protect both inter-racial marriage in the United States and same-sex marriage in the United States, and effectively codify the decisions of the Supreme Court of the United States in both Loving v. Virginia and Obergefell v. Hodges. On October 3, 2022, she said that was an "extraordinarily difficult" decision.

=== Positions ===
==== Caucus memberships ====
- Conservative Climate Caucus (chair)
- Pandemic Preparedness Caucus (co-chair)
- Congressional Western Caucus (vice chair)

==== Committee assignments ====
For the 118th Congress (2020–2023):

- Committee on Energy and Commerce
  - Subcommittee on Environment, Manufacturing, and Critical Minerals
  - Subcommittee on Health
- Committee on Veterans' Affairs
  - Subcommittee on Health (Chair)
- Select Subcommittee on the Coronavirus Pandemic

==== Leadership ====
Following the 2024 elections, Miller-Meeks ran in the internal House Republican Conference elections for secretary, the sixth-highest ranking post in the conference, but was defeated by Erin Houchin of Indiana.

== Personal life ==
Miller-Meeks is married to Curt Meeks and has two children. She is a Roman Catholic.

In 2022, after her longtime home in Ottumwa had been drawn out of the district in the 2020 round of redistricting, Miller-Meeks changed her voter registration to a house in LeClaire, near Davenport, owned by state senator Chris Cournoyer. In 2023, she received a homestead credit for her house in Ottumwa, and listed it as her residence both on congressional disclosure reports and campaign forms. Before the 2024 primary, Miller-Meeks rented an apartment in Davenport and registered to vote there. Members of the House are only constitutionally required to live in the state they represent, while Iowa law requires voters to register and vote in the county where they primarily reside.

Two months before the 2024 general election, an Iowa citizen filed a complaint with the Office of Congressional Ethics, arguing that Miller-Meeks had violated state law by registering in Scott County, home to Davenport, rather than in Wapello County, home to Ottumwa. In a 2024 election debate, Miller-Meeks defended questions about her residency, saying she had been honest when she said she would not sell her Wapello County property, saying "In Iowa, land is valuable and we hold onto it, so I have a property there." She said she divides her time between an apartment in Washington, D.C., an apartment in Davenport, and her property in Ottumwa. In November 2024, an absentee and special precinct board in Scott County accepted Miller-Meeks' ballot cast in the 2024 election, rejecting the residency challenge.

Miller-Meeks organized a physician recruitment and retention organization to help bring physicians to southeast Iowa and has served as a court-appointed special advocate volunteer for children.

== Electoral history ==
=== 2008 ===
2008 Iowa's 2nd congressional district election
Party	Candidate	Votes	%
Democratic	Dave Loebsack (incumbent)	175,218	57.19
Republican	Mariannette Miller-Meeks	118,778	38.77
Green	Wendy Barth	6,664	2.18
Independent	Brian White	5,437	1.78
No party	Others	261	0.09
Total votes		306,358	100.00
Turnout			
Democratic hold			

=== 2010 ===
2010 Iowa's 2nd congressional district election
Party	Candidate	Votes	%
Democratic	Dave Loebsack (incumbent)	115,839	50.99
Republican	Mariannette Miller-Meeks	104,319	45.92
Libertarian	Gary Joseph Sicard	4,356	1.92
Constitution	Jon Tack	2,463	1.08
No party	Others	198	0.09
Total votes		227,175	100.00
Turnout			
Democratic hold			

=== 2014 ===
2014 Iowa's 2nd congressional district election
Party	Candidate	Votes	%
Democratic	Dave Loebsack (incumbent)	143,431	52.48
Republican	Mariannette Miller-Meeks	129,455	47.36
Write-ins		443	0.16
Total votes		273,329	100
Democratic hold			

=== 2018 ===
2018 Iowa's 41st senate district primary elections
Party	Candidate	Votes	%
Republican	Mariannette Miller-Meeks	1,706	85.39
Republican	Daniel Cesar	279	13.96
Write-ins		13	0.65
Total votes		2,134	100

2018 Iowa's 41st senate district general election
Party	Candidate	Votes	%
Republican	Mariannette Miller-Meeks	11,451	51.77
Democratic	Mary Stewart	10,632	48.07
Write-ins		36	0.16
Total votes		22,119	100
Republican hold			

=== 2020 ===
Iowa's 2nd congressional district, 2020
Party	Candidate	Votes	%
Republican	Mariannette Miller-Meeks	196,964	49.912
Democratic	Rita Hart	196,958	49.910
Write-ins		703	0.178
Total votes		394,625	100.0
Republican gain from Democratic			

=== 2022 ===
Iowa's 2nd congressional district, 2022
Party	Candidate	Votes	%
Republican	Mariannette Miller-Meeks (incumbent)	160,441	53.3
Democratic	Christina Bohannan	140,453	46.6
Write-ins		256	0.1
Total votes		301,150	100.0

=== 2024 ===
Iowa's 1st congressional district, 2024
Party	Candidate	Votes	%
Republican	Mariannette Miller-Meeks (incumbent)	206,955	49.98
Democratic	Christina Bohannan	206,156	49.79
Write-in		967	0.23
Total votes		414,078	100.0
Republican hold			

== See also ==
- Women in the United States House of Representatives

U.S. House of Representatives
Preceded by Dave Loebsack	Member of the U.S. House of Representatives from Iowa's 2nd congressional district 2021–2023	Succeeded by Ashley Hinson
Preceded by Ashley Hinson	Member of the U.S. House of Representatives from Iowa's 1st congressional district 2023–present	Incumbent
U.S. order of precedence (ceremonial)
Preceded by Mary Miller	United States representatives by seniority 265th	Succeeded by Barry Moore
