= Ross Wilburn =

American politician

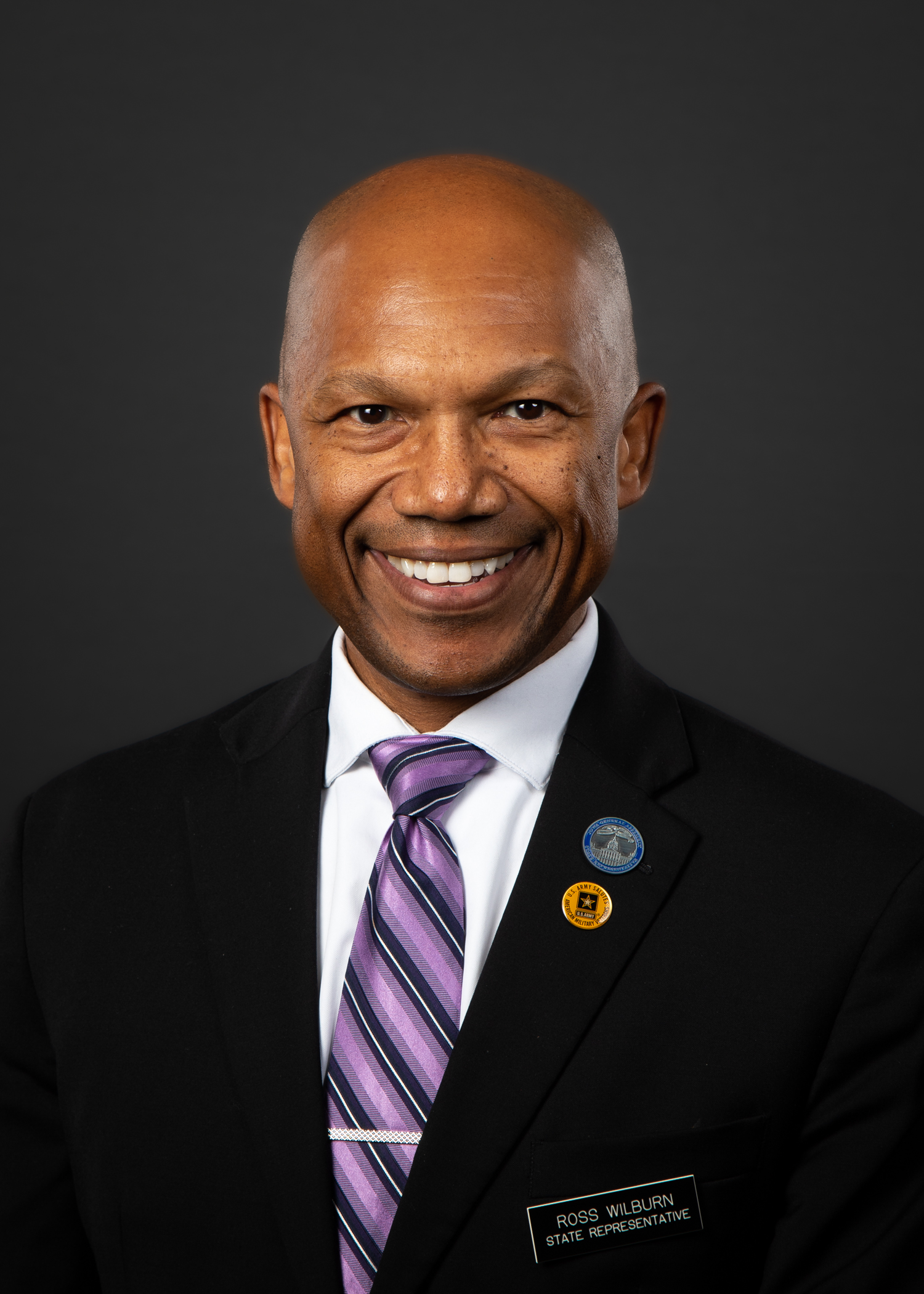
- Wilburn in 2023

Chair of the Iowa Democratic Party
- In office January 23, 2021 – January 29, 2023
- Preceded by: Mark Smith
- Succeeded by: Rita Hart

Member of the Iowa House of Representatives
- Incumbent
- Assumed office January 2019
- Preceded by: Lisa Heddens
- Constituency: 46th district (2019–2023); 50th district (2023–present)

Mayor of Iowa City
- In office 2006–2008

Personal details
- Born: 1964 or 1965 (age 61–62) Galesburg, Illinois, U.S.
- Party: Democratic
- Education: University of Iowa (BA, MSW)

Military service
- Allegiance: United States
- Branch/service: United States Army
- Unit: Iowa Army National Guard

Ross Wilburn (1964/1965) is an American politician and social worker serving as a member of the Iowa House of Representatives from the 50th district. Elected in November 2018, he assumed office in January 2019. Wilburn has also served as chair of the Iowa Democratic Party from January 2021 until 2023.

== Early life and education ==
Wilburn was born in Galesburg, Illinois and raised in Ames, Iowa. After graduating from high school, Wilburn joined the Iowa Army National Guard. He earned a Bachelor of Social Work and Master of Social Work from the University of Iowa.

== Career ==
From 1997 to 2000, Wilburn was the graduate program director of the School of Social Work Quad Cities Center at the University of Iowa. From 2000 to 2007, he worked as the executive director of the Crisis Center of Johnson County. From 2008 to 2014, he served as the director of equity at the Iowa City Community School District. Wilburn was elected to the Iowa City Council in 2006 and served for 12 years, including for one term (2006–2008) as mayor of Iowa City. Wilburn was a candidate for the 2018 Iowa gubernatorial election, placing last in the Democratic primary. He was later elected to the Iowa House of Representatives in November 2018 and assumed office in 2019. He serves as the ranking member of the House Veterans Affairs Committee. In January 2021, Wilburn became the chair of the Iowa Democratic Party.

=== Committee assignments ===
As of January 2025, Wilburn serves on the following committees in the Iowa House.

- Ethics (ranking member)
- Judiciary (ranking member)
- Administration and Rules
- Appropriations
- Health and Human Services
- Higher Education

Party political offices
Preceded by Mark Smith	Chair of the Iowa Democratic Party; 2021–2023	Succeeded by Rita Hart
