= Brent Roske =

American film director

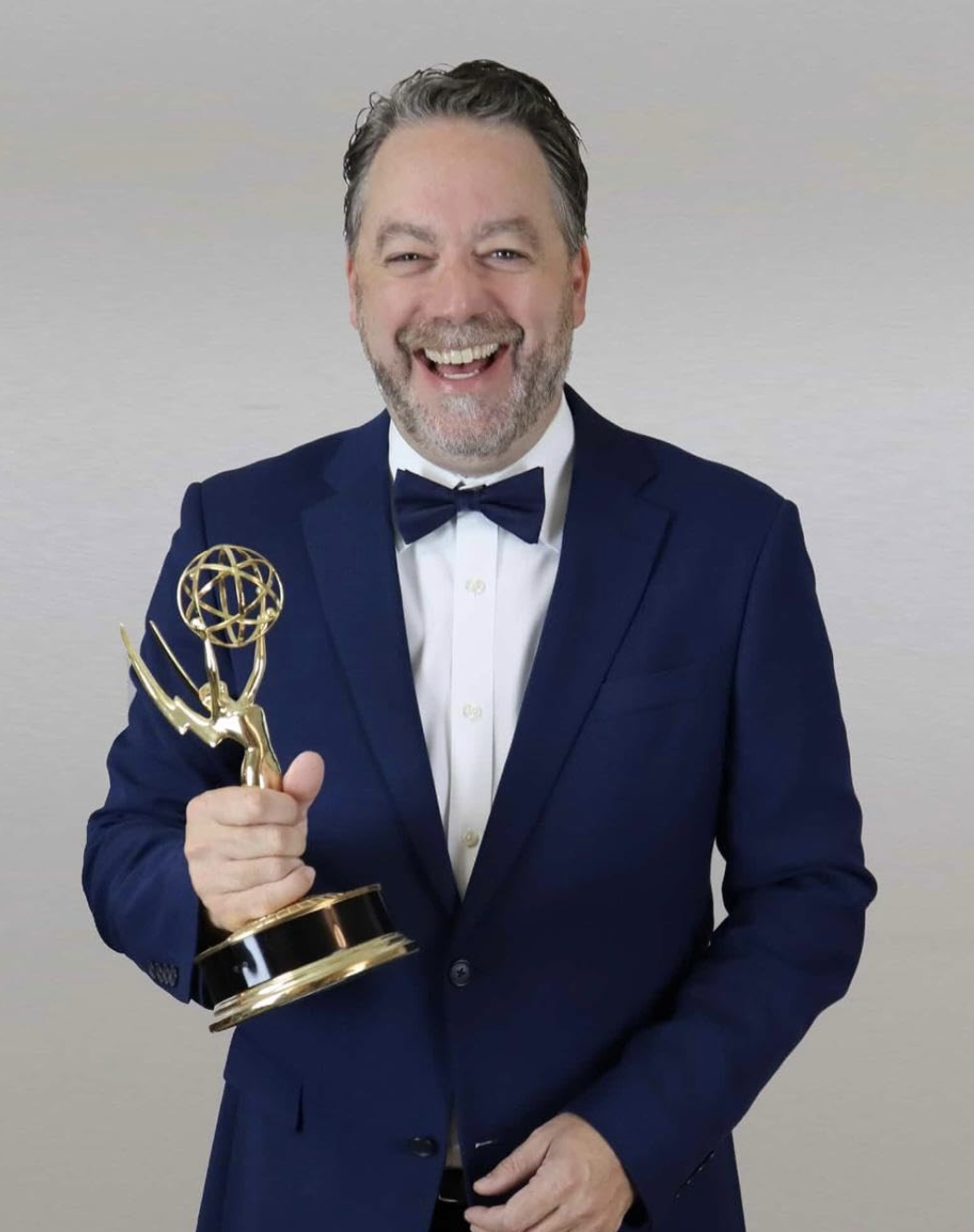
Brent Roske with Los Angeles Regional Emmy Award

Brent Roske is the founder of the Flamingo Network, a former federal and state candidate for office, 2-time POTUS campaign manager and an Emmy winning film and television director. Roske is the former Creative Director for NBC Skycastle and MJA Advertising.

USA Today wrote: "The last decade of Brent Roske's life reads like a movie script."

His works include the feature film Diana In Love which is rated 94% on Rotten Tomatoes, Radford Motors with TV host Ant Anstead and Jenson Button. He directed PSA the Got Your 6 with singer Gavin DeGraw. Roske appears with Lasse Hallstrom, Colm Bairead, and Shanti Fiennes in an Apple podcast.

Roske has been nominated for five National and Regional Emmy Awards and received a Los Angeles Commemorative Emmy Award for producing 'Tiger Woods One on One' for NBC Sports. The Wrap recently published Roske’s memoir ‘My Friend Sally Kirkland’ about his time with the Oscar nominated actress.

== Emmy Awards ==
Year	Event	Award	Title	Result	Ref.
2025	Emmy Awards	Arts & Entertainment	Ollie Gabriel’s New Nashville	Nominated	
2021	Emmy Awards	Politics/ Government Program	Roske on Politics	Nominated	
2007	Emmy Awards	Sports Special	Tiger Woods One on One	Won	

== Career ==
Brent Roske is the former Creative Director for NBC Skycastle and MJA Advertising. Projects include Radford: Cars & Guitars for Discovery+ and Justice 4 Vets, which premiered at a gala on the Warner Brothers backlot hosted by U.S. Department of Veterans Affairs Secretary Robert McDonald. Roske wrote and directed the political drama Chasing the Hill with Emmy nominee Robin Weigert (Calamity Jane on ‘Deadwood’) and Richard Schiff (Toby from ‘The West Wing’) and the sequel Courting Des Moines. Roske hosted the bi-partisan TV series Roske on Politics (Emmy Award nominee for Best Politics/ Government Program), featuring conversations with the presidential candidates, politicians, journalists, entertainers and community leaders. Roske was a creative director at NBC Universal for nine years earning an Emmy Award.

The Des Moines Register wrote an article titled Consider Iowa - California Transplants Collaborate On Video Praising States Charms about a video Roske directed starring professional skateboarder Mike Vallely.

== Political campaigns ==
In 2014, Roske ran for US Congress in California's 33rd district while living on a yacht anchored off Marina del Rey. He was an independent candidate in the 2018 Iowa gubernatorial election, and was endorsed by Oscar winner Richard Dreyfuss. In 2019, Roske joined the John Delaney 2020 presidential campaign as the Iowa State Director.

The day after the US House of Representatives passed HR51, DC Shadow Senator Paul Strauss tweeted: 'In honor of Brent Roske's birthday, I do hereby proclaim him to be an Ambassador of the District of Columbia (AODC) and thank him for all he has done to advance DC Statehood.'

== Filmography as director ==
- Diana In Love (2023)
- Chasing The Hill (2012)

== Personal life ==
Brent Roske is married to Megan Elizabeth Roske, with the ceremony taking place on their yacht in Marina del Rey, CA.
