= Andy McGuire =

American politician

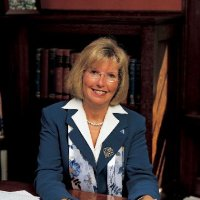

Chair of the Iowa Democratic Party
- In office January 17, 2015 – January 21, 2017
- Preceded by: Scott Brennan
- Succeeded by: Derek Eadon

Personal details
- Born: November 26, 1956 (age 68); Waterloo, Iowa, U.S.
- Political party: Democratic
- Spouse: Dan McGuire
- Children: 7
- Education: Creighton University (BS, MD); Kennesaw State University (MBA)

Andrea "Andy" McGuire (born November 26, 1956) is an American politician and doctor. She served as Iowa Democratic Party chair from 2015 to 2017. Prior to becoming the chair of the Iowa Democratic Party, McGuire ran unsuccessfully for the Democratic nomination for Iowa’s lieutenant governor.

She was a candidate in the Democratic Party primary for Governor of Iowa in the 2018 election.

== Early life ==
McGuire was born in Waterloo, Iowa. She was the fifth of six children. She graduated with honors from West High in 1975.

In 1978, McGuire graduated with honors from Creighton University with a degree in Chemistry. Then earned a Doctor of Medicine from the Creighton University School of Medicine, one of 11 women in her graduating class.

After graduation, McGuire relocated to St. Louis for her medical internship and residency. She did a rotation at St John's Mercy Medical Center in St. Louis for a year and then worked at a walk-in clinic for a year to pay off her student loans. She then entered a Nuclear Medicine residency for the next three years at the Veteran’s Administration and St. Louis University Medical Center.

In 1999, McGuire pursued an MBA from Kennesaw State University. She graduated in 2001 with a Master of Business Administration.

== Career ==
=== Medicine ===
In 1987, McGuire followed her husband, currently an orthopedic spine surgeon, to his fellowship in Springfield, Illinois. There, she worked part-time with a radiology group.

After several years working in nuclear medicine and publishing in her field, McGuire and her husband moved back to Iowa to raise their children. In short time, McGuire found work at the Des Moines Veterans Administration before becoming Medical Director at Wellmark Blue Cross Blue Shield.

McGuire left Wellmark to become Chief Medical Officer and Vice President of Medical and Network Management/Risk Selection at American Republic Insurance Company (which later became American Enterprise Group).

In 2012, McGuire was asked to be the President of Meridian of Iowa, a Medicaid-managed care company. Under McGuire’s leadership, Meridian doubled immunizations rates and prenatal care. After three years of leading Meridian, McGuire left the company to become chair of the Iowa Democratic Party.

=== Politics ===
On January 17, 2015, Mcguire was elected by the Iowa Democratic Party's State Central Committee as chair of the party on the third round of balloting. During her term as chair, McGuire raised more than $2 million for the party, traveled to all of Iowa’s 99 counties, and formed the Caucus Committee to recommend changes and improvements to the Iowa caucuses.

McGuire's First Vice Chair, Danny Homan, resigned his seat over her failure to reunite the party's Bernie Sanders-aligned and Hillary Clinton-aligned factions after a statistically tied and contended 2016 caucus.

In April 2017 McGuire announced her candidacy for Governor of Iowa. Her announced endorsements include former U.S. Representative Leonard Boswell, former lowa Attorney General Bonnie Campbell, former Senate leader Michael Gronstal, and former U.S. Attorney Roxanne Conlin.

== Personal life ==
While attending Creighton University, McGuire met fellow student Dan McGuire, and they later married. They have seven children and one grandchild.

Political offices
Preceded by Scott Brennan	Chair of the Iowa Democratic Party; 2015–2016	Succeeded by Derek Eadon
