= 2018 Iowa gubernatorial election =

- November 6, 2018
- Turnout: 61.15% ▲8.44pp
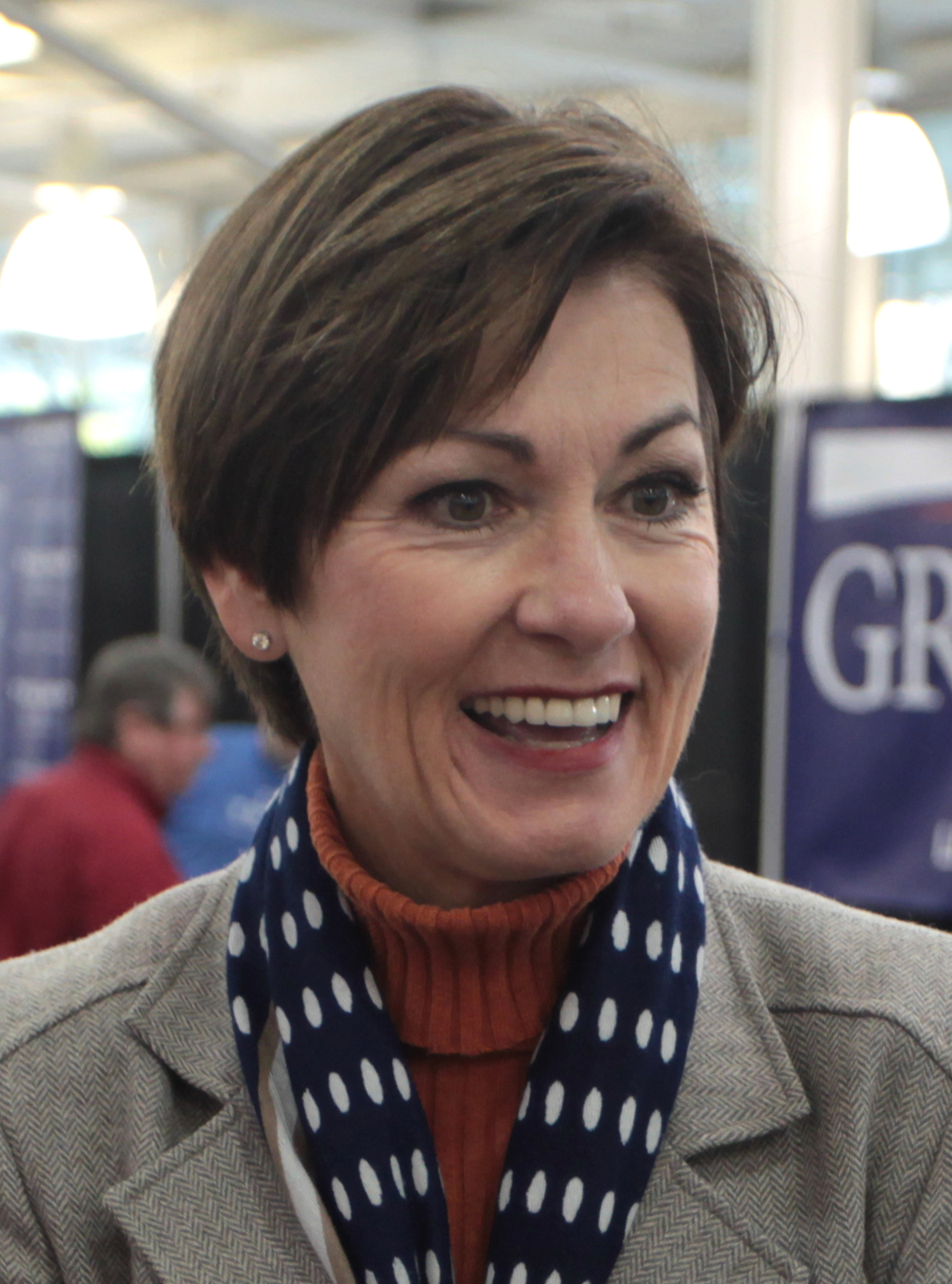

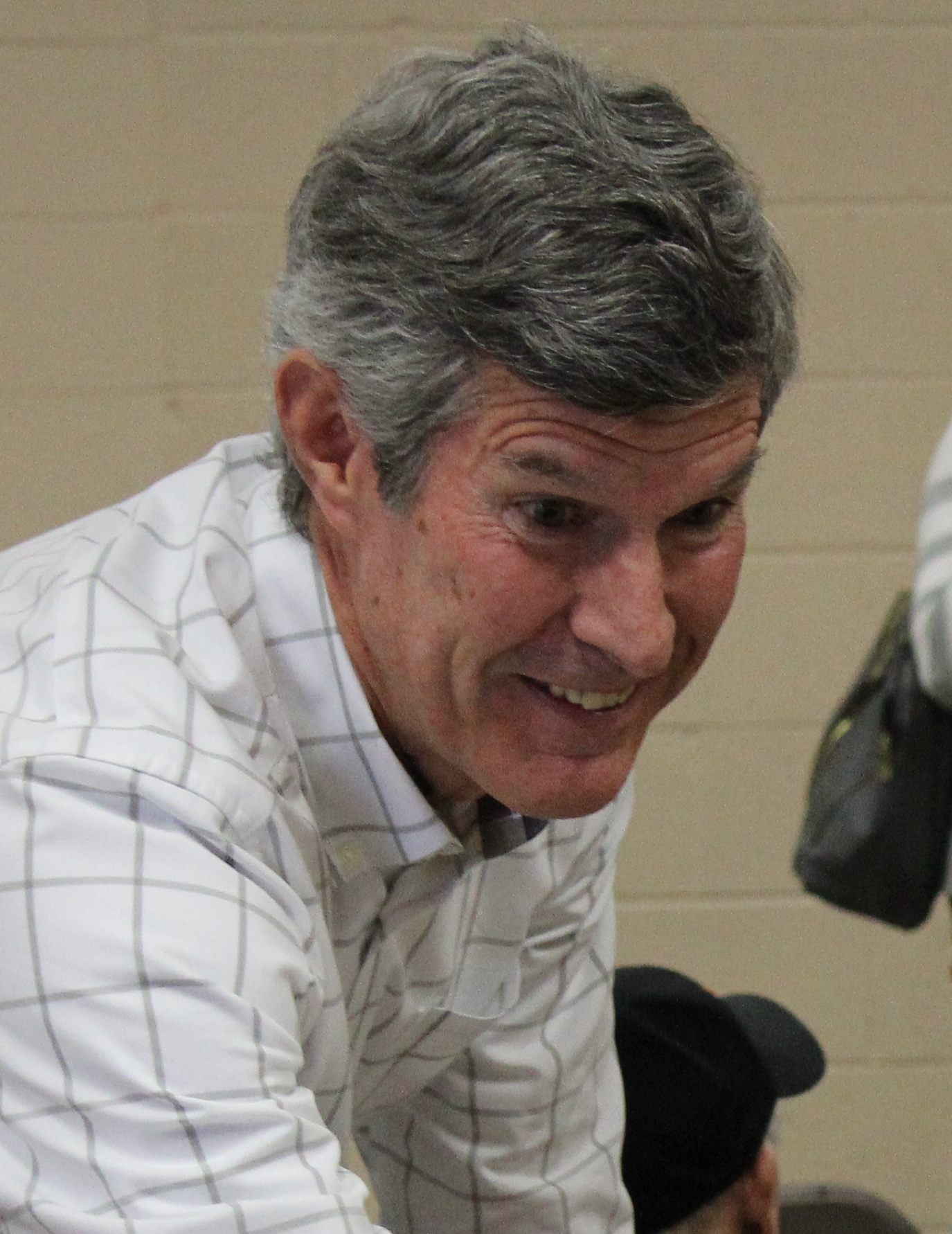
Nominee	Kim Reynolds	Fred Hubbell
Party	Republican	Democratic
Running mate	Adam Gregg	Rita Hart
Popular vote	667,275	630,986
Percentage	50.26%	47.53%
- Reynolds: 40–50% 50–60% 60–70% 70–80% 80–90% >90% Hubbell: 40–50% 50–60% 60–70% 70–80% 80–90% >90% Tie: 40–50%
Governor before election
Kim Reynolds
Republican
Elected Governor
Kim Reynolds
Republican

The 2018 Iowa gubernatorial election took place on November 6, 2018. Incumbent Republican Governor Kim Reynolds ran for election to a full term, facing Democratic businessman Fred Hubbell, Libertarian Jake Porter, and independent candidate Gary Siegwarth.

On election day, Reynolds won 50.3% of the vote, a 2.8% margin of victory, and carried 88 of Iowa's 99 counties. She became the first female governor of Iowa elected in her own right. As of 2026, this was the only Iowa gubernatorial election since 1998 in which the winner was of the same party as the incumbent president.

== Background ==
After the 2016 presidential election, President Donald Trump nominated then-Governor Terry Branstad to be the U.S. ambassador to China. When Branstad was confirmed by the United States Senate, he resigned as Iowa governor to assume the ambassadorship on May 24, 2017. Lieutenant Governor Kim Reynolds then became governor of Iowa.

== Republican primary ==
=== Candidates ===
==== Nominated ====
- Kim Reynolds, incumbent governor of Iowa

==== Withdrew ====
- Ron Corbett, mayor of Cedar Rapids
- Steven Ray, mayor pro tempore of Boone

==== Declined ====
- Terry Branstad, U.S. ambassador to China and former governor
- Steve King, U.S. representative
- Bill Northey, U.S. under secretary of agriculture for Farm and Foreign Agricultural Services and former secretary of agriculture of Iowa
- Bob Vander Plaats, president and CEO of The Family Leader, candidate for governor of Iowa in 2002, 2006 and 2010 and nominee for lieutenant governor of Iowa in 2006

=== Endorsements ===
Kim Reynolds

Newspapers

- Sioux City Journal

Politicians

- George W. Bush, 43rd president of the United States (2001–2009)

=== Results ===
Republican primary results
Party	Candidate	Votes	%
Republican	Kim Reynolds (incumbent)	94,118	98.63
Republican	Write-ins	1,307	1.37
Total votes		95,425	100

== Democratic primary ==
=== Candidates ===
==== Nominated ====
- Fred Hubbell, businessman

==== Eliminated in primary ====
- Cathy Glasson, president of SEIU Local 199
- Andy McGuire, former chairwoman of the Iowa Democratic Party and candidate for lieutenant governor in 2006
- John Norris, former chief of staff to Governor Tom Vilsack, former Federal Energy Regulatory Commission member and nominee for IA-04 in 2002
- Ross Wilburn, former mayor of Iowa City

==== Withdrew ====
- Nate Boulton, state senator
- Rich Leopold, director of the Polk County Conservation Board and former director of the Iowa Department of Natural Resources
- Mike Matson, Davenport alderman
- Jon Neiderbach, attorney, former member of the Des Moines School Board and nominee for state auditor in 2014
- Todd Prichard, state representative

==== Declined ====
- Chaz Allen, state senator
- Joe Bolkcom, state senator
- Bill Brauch, former director of the Consumer Protection Division of the Iowa Attorney General's Office
- Mike Carberry, Johnson County supervisor
- Jeff Danielson, state senator
- Michael Gronstal, former majority leader of the Iowa Senate
- Chris Hall, state representative
- Rita Hart, state senator (nominee for lieutenant governor)
- Jack Hatch, former state senator and nominee for governor of Iowa in 2014
- Rob Hogg, minority leader of the Iowa Senate and candidate for the U.S. Senate in 2016
- Pam Jochum, state senator
- Dave Loebsack, U.S. representative
- Liz Mathis, state senator
- Jim Mowrer, nominee for IA-04 in 2014 and IA-03 in 2016 (ran for the nomination for secretary of state)
- Tyler Olson, former state representative, former chairman of the Iowa Democratic Party and candidate for governor of Iowa in 2014
- Janet Petersen, state senator
- Steve Sodders, former state senator
- Tom Vilsack, former U.S. secretary of agriculture and former governor of Iowa

=== Endorsements ===
Nate Boulton (withdrew)

Statewide officials

- Martin O'Malley, former governor of Maryland and 2016 presidential candidate

State legislators

- Tony Bisignano, state senator
- Joe Bolkcom, state senator
- Tod Bowman, state senator
- Bill Dotzler, state senator
- Rita Hart, state senator
- Pam Jochum, state senator and former president of the Iowa Senate
- Jerry Kearns, state representative
- Kevin Kinney, state senator
- Liz Mathis, state senator
- Amy Nielsen, state representative
- Rick Olson, state representative
- Janet Petersen, state senator
- Herman Quirmbach, state senator
- Art Staed, state representative
- Rich Taylor, state senator

Organizations

- Bricklayers & Allied Craftworkers Local 3 Iowa
- Central Iowa Building & Construction Trades Council
- Communication Workers of America Local 7102
- Des Moines Police Officers
- Des Moines Professional Fire Fighters Local 4
- International Union of Operating Engineers Local 234
- Laborers Local 177
- Plumbers and Steamfitters Local 33
- Sheet Metal Workers Local 45
- State Conference
- United Steelworkers of Iowa
Cathy Glasson

Elected officials

- Holly Berg, Ottumwa City Council member
- Mike Carberry, Johnson County supervisor
- Matt Dalbey, Ottumwa City Council member
- Kurt Friese, Johnson County supervisor
- Kate Larson, Dubuque City Council member

Iowa Democratic Party officials

- Alex Anderson, Iowa Democratic Party State Central Committee affirmative action chairperson
- Evan Burger, 4th District Iowa Democratic Party State Central Committee member
- Lindsey Ellickson, Linn County Democratic Party central committee member
- Jessica Fears, 4th District Iowa Democratic Party State Central Committee member
- Mason Fraker, Henry County Democratic Party vice-chairman
- Jason Frerichs, Iowa Democratic Party State Central Committee member, chairman of the Iowa Democratic Party Progressive Caucus
- Dylan P. Funk, Iowa Democratic Party State Central Committee member, vice-chairman of the Iowa Democratic Party Progressive Caucus
- Jon Green, 2nd District Iowa Democratic Party State Central Committee member
- Holly Herbert, 3rd District Iowa Democratic Party State Central Committee member
- Sarah J. Hinds, Linn County Democratic Party credentials committee chairperson
- Kate Revaux, 2nd District Iowa Democratic Party State Central Committee member
- Nora Taft, 2nd District Iowa Democratic Party State Central Committee member

Labor union leaders

- Chris Laursen, UAW Local 74 president

Labor unions

- National Nurses United

Organizations

- Iowa Citizens for Community Improvement Action Fund
- Our Revolution
- The People for Bernie Sanders
- People's Action
- Progressive Change Campaign Committee
Fred Hubbell

Statewide officials

- Jay Inslee, governor of Washington
- Tom Miller, attorney general of Iowa
- Sally Pederson, former lieutenant governor of Iowa

State legislators

- Staci Appel, former state senator
- Deborah Berry, former state representative
- Dennis Black, former state senator
- Wayne Ford, former state representative
- Ruth Ann Gaines, state representative
- Chris Hall, state representative
- Jack Hatch, former state senator
- Doris Kelley, former state representative
- George Kinley, former majority leader of the Iowa Senate
- Vicki Lensing, state representative
- Mary Mascher, state representative
- Kevin McCarthy, former majority leader of the Iowa House of Representatives
- Helen Miller, state representative
- Todd Prichard, state representative
- Mike Reasoner, former state representative
- Joe Riding, former state representative
- Sally Stutsman, former state representative
- Jane Teaford, former state representative
- Cindy Winckler, state representative
- Mary Wolfe, state representative
- Frank Wood, former state senator

Newspapers

- The Des Moines Register
Andy McGuire

Individuals

- Leonard Boswell, former U.S. representative
- Bonnie Campbell, former Iowa attorney general
- Roxanne Conlin, former U.S. attorney for the Southern District of Iowa and 2010 U.S. Senate nominee
- Howard Dean, former governor of Vermont and former Democratic National Committee chairman
- Michael Gronstal, former majority leader of the Iowa Senate
- Gary Kroeger, 2016 State House candidate and activist
- Ryan McDaniel, president of the Student Leadership Council for Iowa Safe Schools
- Linda Nelson, former state representative and former president of the Iowa State Education Association
- Phyllis Thede, state representative
- Jamie Woods, chair of the Black Caucus of the Iowa Democratic Party
- Jo Ann Zimmerman, former lieutenant governor of Iowa
John Norris

Individuals

- Brad Anderson, 2014 Democratic secretary of state nominee
- Marti Anderson, state representative
- Daryll Beal, former state senator
- Tom Hockensmith, Polk County supervisor
- Marcia Nichols, former political director for AFSCME 61
- Jo Oldson, state representative
- Brian Quirk, former state representative
- Don Ruby, Iowa Democratic Party secretary
- Dave Schroeder, former state representative
- Norm Sterzenbach, former executive director, Iowa Democratic Party
- Rod Sullivan, Johnson County supervisor
- Roger Thomas, former state representative
- Travis Weipert, Johnson County auditor
- Andrew Wenthe, mayor of Fayette, former state representative
Todd Prichard (withdrew)

Individuals

- Bruce Bearinger, state representative
- Timi Brown-Powers, state representative
- David Dawson, former state representative
- Bob Dvorsky, state senator
- Ro Foege, former state representative
- Ruth Ann Gaines, state representative
- Dave Jacoby, state representative
- Tim Kacena, state representative
- Monica Kurth, state representative
- Dan Muhlbauer, former state representative
- Sharon Steckman, state representative
- Sally Stutsman, former state representative
- Roger Thomas, former state representative
- Mary Wolfe, state representative

=== Polling ===
Hypothetical polling

Poll source	Date(s) administered	Sample size	Margin of error	Nate Boulton	Cathy Glasson	Fred Hubbell	Andrea McGuire	Jon Neiderbach	John Norris	Ross Wilburn	Other	Undecided
Selzer & Company	May 13–15, 2018	501	± 4.4%	20%	13%	31%	5%	–	5%	3%	10%	14%
Remington	May 5–6, 2018	2,315	± 2.0%	20%	7%	46%	3%	–	5%	1%	–	18%
20-20 Insight	November 8–10, 2017	762	± 3.6%	13%	6%	22%	3%	2%	5%	1%	–	47%

=== Results ===
Results by county: Hubbell—70–80% Hubbell—60–70% Hubbell—50–60% Hubbell—40–50% Hubbell—<40% Glasson—<40% Norris—60–70% Boulton—<40%

Democratic primary results
Party	Candidate	Votes	%
Democratic	Fred Hubbell	99,245	55.41
Democratic	Cathy Glasson	36,815	20.55
Democratic	John Norris	20,498	11.44
Democratic	Andy McGuire	9,404	5.25
Democratic	Nate Boulton (withdrawn)	9,082	5.07
Democratic	Ross Wilburn	3,880	2.17
Democratic	Write-ins	200	0.01
Total votes		179,124	100

== Libertarian primary ==
Libertarian Party presidential nominee Gary Johnson received 3.8 percent of the votes in Iowa in 2016, surpassing the 2 percent threshold to attain full political party status. As a result, the Libertarian Party was allowed to hold a primary to select a nominee.

=== Candidates ===
==== Nominated ====
- Jake Porter, business consultant

==== Declared ====
- Marco Battaglia, musician
- Jake Porter, nominee for secretary of state in 2010 and 2014

=== Endorsements ===
Jake Porter

Newspapers

- The Des Moines Register

=== Results ===
Libertarian primary results
Party	Candidate	Votes	%
Libertarian	Jake Porter	991	53.92
Libertarian	Marco Battaglia	705	38.36
Libertarian	Write-ins	142	7.73
Total votes		1,838	100

== Independents ==
=== Candidates ===
- Gary Siegwarth, fisheries biologist

==== Withdrew ====
- Brent Roske, director and candidate for CA-33 in 2014

=== Endorsements ===
Brent Roske (withdrew)
- Richard Dreyfuss, actor

== General election ==
=== Debates ===
Dates	Location	Reynolds	Hubbell	Link
October 17, 2018	Sioux City, Iowa	Participant	Participant	Full debate - C-SPAN
October 21, 2018	Davenport, Iowa	Participant	Participant	Full debate - C-SPAN

=== Predictions ===
Source	Ranking	As of
The Cook Political Report	Tossup	October 26, 2018
The Washington Post	Tossup	November 5, 2018
FiveThirtyEight	Lean D (flip)	November 5, 2018
Rothenberg Political Report	Tilt D (flip)	November 1, 2018
Sabato's Crystal Ball	Lean D (flip)	November 5, 2018
RealClearPolitics	Tossup	November 4, 2018
Daily Kos	Tossup	November 5, 2018
Fox News (Note: The Fox News Midterm Power Rankings uniquely does not contain a category for Safe/Solid races)	Tossup	November 5, 2018
Politico	Tossup	November 5, 2018
Governing	Tossup	November 5, 2018

=== Polling ===
View source data.

Poll source	Date(s) administered	Sample size	Margin of error	Kim Reynolds (R)	Fred Hubbell (D)	Jake Porter (L)	Other	Undecided
Change Research	November 2–4, 2018	961	–	46%	49%	3%	1%	–
Selzer & Company	October 30 – November 2, 2018	801	± 3.5%	44%	46%	2%	1%	7%
Emerson College	October 29 – November 1, 2018	1,462	± 2.7%	49%	45%	–	2%	5%
University of Iowa	October 8–22, 2018	452	–	40%	48%	–	5%	6%
Selzer & Company	September 17–20, 2018	555	± 4.2%	41%	43%	7%	0%	9%
Emerson College	September 6–8, 2018	1,000	± 3.2%	31%	36%	–	7%	26%
Selzer & Company	January 28–31, 2018	801	± 3.5%	42%	37%	–	12%	10%

Hypothetical polling

with Nate Boulton

Poll source	Date(s) administered	Sample size	Margin of error	Kim Reynolds (R)	Nate Boulton (D)	Other	Undecided
Selzer & Company	January 28–31, 2018	801	± 3.5%	41%	37%	11%	11%

with Cathy Glasson

Poll source	Date(s) administered	Sample size	Margin of error	Kim Reynolds (R)	Cathy Glasson (D)	Other	Undecided
Selzer & Company	January 28–31, 2018	801	± 3.5%	44%	31%	14%	12%

with generic Democrat

Poll source	Date(s) administered	Sample size	Margin of error	Kim Reynolds (R)	Generic Democrat	Undecided
20/20 Insights (D-Mowrer)	June 19–21, 2017	526	± 4.3%	44%	39%	17%

with John Norris

Poll source	Date(s) administered	Sample size	Margin of error	Kim Reynolds (R)	John Norris (D)	Other	Undecided
Selzer & Company	January 28–31, 2018	801	± 3.5%	41%	30%	14%	15%

with Andy McGuire

Poll source	Date(s) administered	Sample size	Margin of error	Kim Reynolds (R)	Andy McGuire (D)	Other	Undecided
Selzer & Company	January 28–31, 2018	801	± 3.5%	42%	30%	15%	13%

=== Results ===
While pre-election polls showed Reynolds trailing Hubbell, Reynolds won 50.3% of the vote on election day, primarily by sweeping every county west of Des Moines and dominating the 4th Congressional District (she lost the other three). Ultimately, she carried 88 of Iowa's 99 counties. She became the first female governor of Iowa elected in her own right.

Iowa gubernatorial election, 2018
Party	Candidate	Votes	%	±%
Republican	Kim Reynolds (incumbent)	667,275	50.26%	−8.73%
Democratic	Fred Hubbell	630,986	47.53%	+10.26%
Libertarian	Jake Porter	21,426	1.61%	−0.19%
Independent	Gary Siegwarth	7,463	0.56%	N/A
Write-in		488	0.04%	N/A
Total votes		1,327,638	100.00%	N/A
Republican hold				

==== Counties that flipped from Republican to Democratic ====
- Black Hawk (largest city: Waterloo)
- Clinton (largest city: Clinton)
- Des Moines (largest city: Burlington)
- Dubuque (largest city: Dubuque)
- Jefferson (largest city: Fairfield)
- Lee (largest city: Fort Madison)
- Linn (largest city: Cedar Rapids)
- Polk (largest city: Des Moines)
- Scott (largest city: Davenport)
- Story (largest city: Ames)

==== By congressional district ====
Despite losing the state, Hubbell won three of four congressional districts.

District	Reynolds	Hubbell	Representative
1st	48%	49%	Abby Finkenauer
2nd	47%	51%	Dave Loebsack
3rd	47%	51%	Cindy Axne
4th	59%	39%	Steve King

== See also ==
- Iowa elections, 2018
