= Fred Hubbell =

American businessman and politician (born 1951)

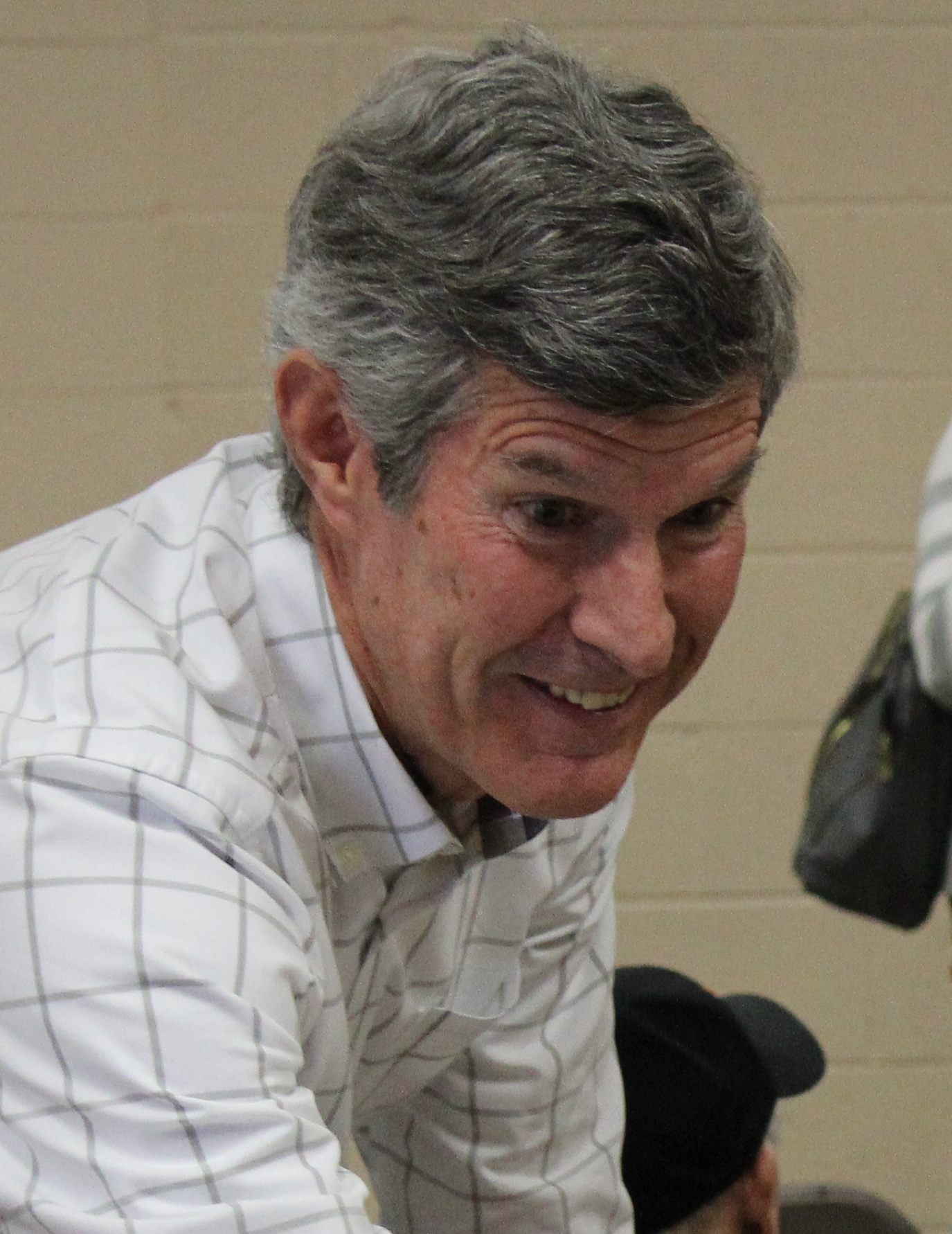
- Hubbell in 2017

Personal details
- Born: Frederick Shelton Hubbell; April 25, 1951 (age 75) Des Moines, Iowa, U.S.
- Party: Democratic
- Spouse: Charlotte Beyer
- Children: 3
- Education: University of North Carolina at Chapel Hill (BA); University of Iowa (JD)

Frederick Shelton Hubbell (born April 25, 1951) is an American attorney, businessman and politician. He was the Democratic nominee for Governor of Iowa in the 2018 election. Before running for office, Hubbell served as Chair of the Younkers retail department stores in the 1980s and President of Equitable of Iowa. He served as Acting Director of the Department of Economic Development of Iowa and as Chair of the Iowa Power Fund in the 2000s.

== Biography ==
Hubbell was born and raised in Des Moines, Iowa. He received a bachelor's degree from the University of North Carolina at Chapel Hill and a Juris Doctor from the University of Iowa College of Law. While attending law school, Fred met his wife, Charlotte. They reside in Des Moines and have three married adult children and nine grandchildren. He is descended from the Hubbell family, a prominent business family in the early history of Des Moines. The Hubbell family mansion is now Terrace Hill, the official residence of the Governor of Iowa.

After graduating from law school, Hubbell worked as an attorney in New York City. In 1981, Hubbell and his wife were held hostage during the 1981 Pakistan International Airlines hijacking.

== Private career ==
Hubbell began working for Equitable of Iowa Companies in 1983. Equitable was a life insurance company originally founded by his great-great grandfather, Frederick M. Hubbell, in the 1860s. In 1985, Hubbell became Chairman of Equitable's Younkers retail department store subsidiary. In 1987, he became President of Equitable. While at Equitable, he led day-to-day operations and strategic initiatives and was given credit for "orchestrating a revival of the once sleepy corporation." He continued as president until the company was acquired by ING Group in 1997.

In 2009, Governor Chet Culver appointed Hubbell as Acting Director of the Department of Economic Development of Iowa to help clean up hundreds of millions of dollars in waste related to a film tax scandal. During his tenure, Hubbell helped conduct a Tax Credit Review Panel, identifying $160 million in tax credits and incentives that were producing little return for Iowa that could be eliminated or repurposed to better serve the state. Additionally, Hubbell served as Chair of the Iowa Power Fund Board of Directors from 2007 to 2010, tasked with investing $100 million in wind and renewable energy across Iowa.

In February 2019, Hubbell was injured in a bicycle crash in Arizona, according to a statement from his wife Charlotte. Hubbell made a full recovery.

== Philanthropic work ==
Hubbell has worked and served with a large variety of nonprofits and philanthropic organizations. He served on the Des Moines Mercy Hospital Medical Center Board of Trustees from 1982 to 1989, on the Planned Parenthood of Mid-Iowa Board of Directors from 1982 to 1988 and as Chair of the Board in 1985, as Iowa Chair of the United Negro College Foundation in 1988, as Chair of the Iowa College Foundation Board from 1995 to 1996, as Co-Chair of the Des Moines Branch NAACP Freedom Fund Banquet in 1996, as Chair of the United Way of Central Iowa Campaign in 1998, on the Simpson College Board of Trustees from 1984 to 2016 and as Chair from 2007 to 2013, as a Member of the University of Iowa College of Business Board of Visitors, and on the Community Foundation of Greater Des Moines Board of Directors beginning in 2007 and as Chair beginning in 2016.

Following the 2008 flood in Eastern Iowa, Hubbell helped lead a disaster relief campaign, The Embrace Iowa - 2008 Iowa Disaster Fund, donating nearly $8 million for local organizations aiding flood victims. Fred and Charlotte Hubbell also helped Broadlawns Medical Center in Des Moines to expand their mental health facility, helping to increase their number of mental health beds by fifty percent and add two new psychiatrists.

== 2018 campaign for Governor of Iowa ==
On July 17, 2017, Hubbell announced his candidacy for Governor of Iowa. On July 24, his campaign announced it had raised more than $1 million, a record total for any Democratic gubernatorial candidate for Iowa Governor, and on January 18, 2018, announced he had raised more than $3 million since launching his campaign. Hubbell was widely seen as a front-runner in the Democratic primary, polling at the top in the field and fundraising more than twice as much as his primary opponents.

On November 14, 2017, Iowa Starting Line released a poll showing Hubbell leading the Democratic primary earning 22% support, 9% more than any other candidate. The poll also showed Hubbell leading the field in favorability (50% favorable, 7% unfavorable). A later poll by The Des Moines Register showed similar results, with Hubbell earning the highest favorability of any Democratic candidate. On January 18, 2018, Hubbell's campaign announced it had raised more than $3 million in 2017, receiving a contribution from all of Iowa's 99 counties, and 99.8% of the contributions coming from individual donors. The more than $3 million fundraising total set an off-election year record in the Democratic primary for Governor of Iowa.

Hubbell received 55% of the vote in the Democratic primary to become the party's nominee for Governor of Iowa. He faced the Republican incumbent, Kim Reynolds and the Libertarian candidate, Jake Porter, in the general election, which was held on November 6, 2018. He narrowly lost to Reynolds.

Iowa gubernatorial election, 2018
Party	Candidate	Votes	%	±%
Republican	Kim Reynolds (incumbent)	667,275	50.26%	−8.73%
Democratic	Fred Hubbell	630,986	47.53%	+10.26%
Libertarian	Jake Porter	21,426	1.61%	−0.19%
Independent	Gary Siegwarth	7,463	0.56%	N/A
n/a	Write-ins	488	0.04%	−0.05%
Total votes		'1,327,638'	'100.0%'	N/A
Republican hold				

Party political offices
Preceded by Jack Hatch	Democratic nominee for Governor of Iowa; 2018	Succeeded by Deidre DeJear
