= 2014 United States Senate election in Iowa =

- November 4, 2014
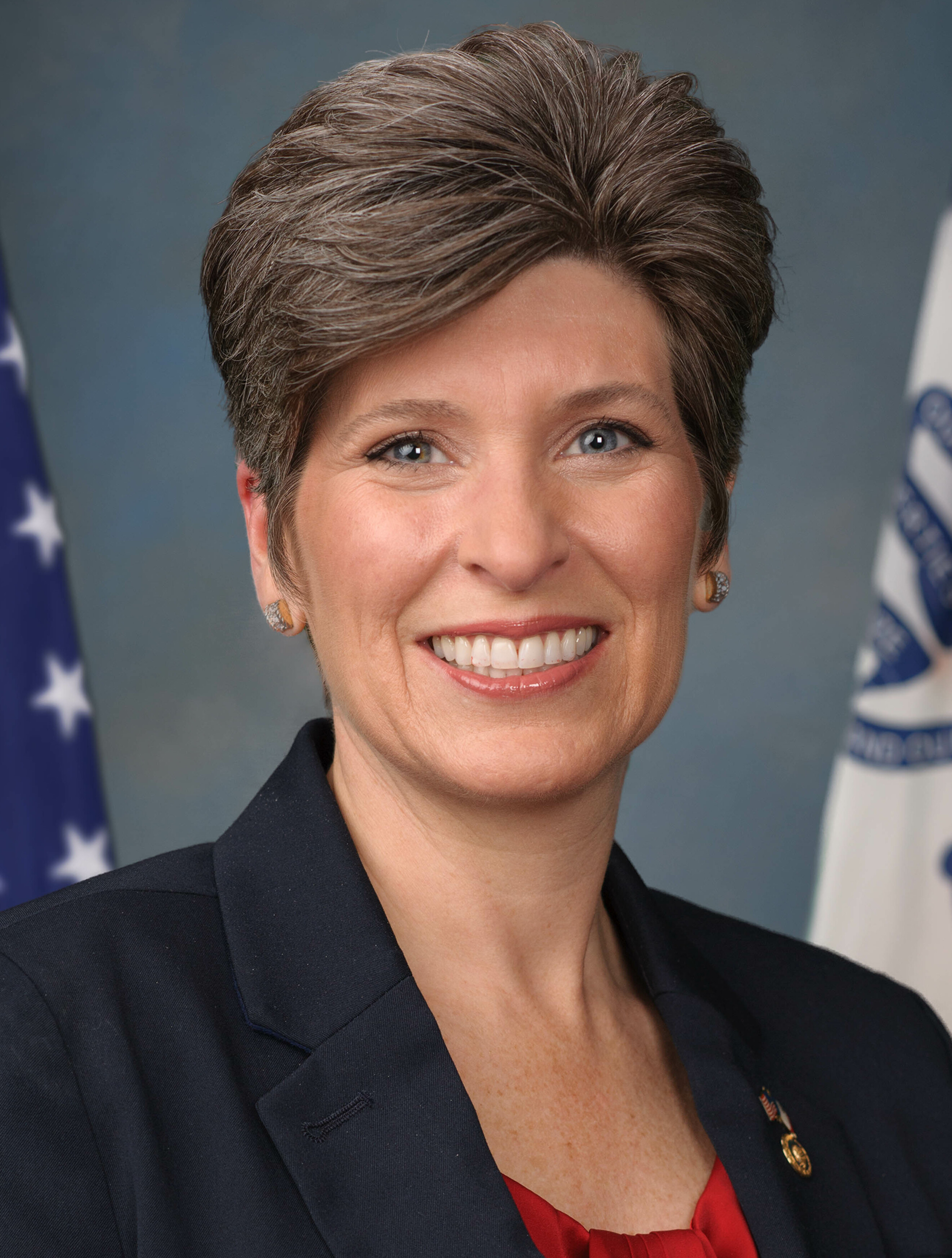

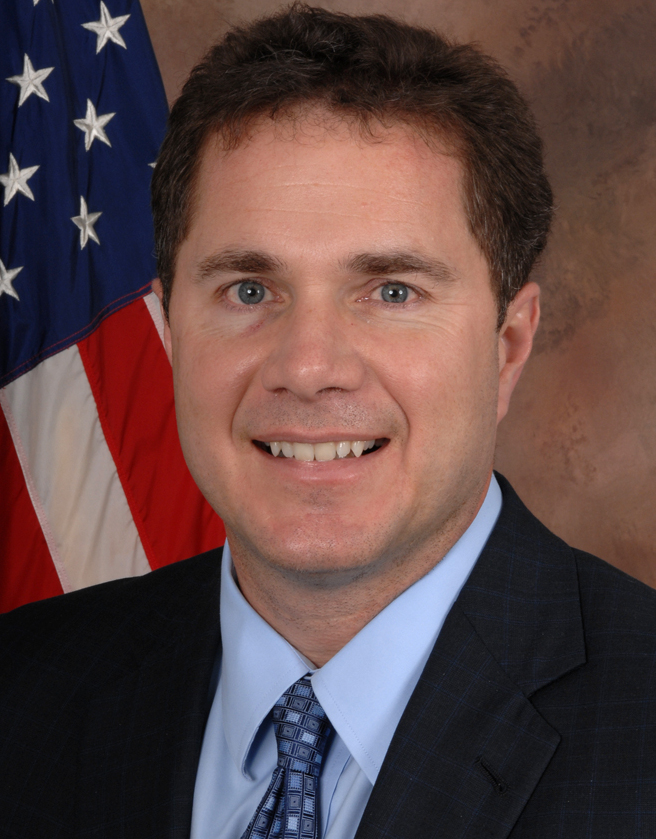
Nominee	Joni Ernst	Bruce Braley
Party	Republican	Democratic
Popular vote	588,575	494,370
Percentage	52.10%	43.76%
- Ernst: 40–50% 50–60% 60–70% 70–80% 80–90% >90% Braley: 40–50% 50–60% 60–70% 70–80% 80–90% >90% Tie: 40–50%
U.S. senator before election
Tom Harkin
Democratic
Elected U.S. Senator
Joni Ernst
Republican

The 2014 United States Senate election in Iowa was held on November 4, 2014. Incumbent Democratic Senator Tom Harkin did not run for reelection to a sixth term in office.

U.S. Representative Bruce Braley was unopposed for the Democratic nomination; the Republicans nominated State Senator Joni Ernst in a June 3 primary election. Douglas Butzier, the Libertarian nominee, died on October 14 in a single engine plane crash near Key West, Iowa. He was the pilot and the only person aboard the plane. He still appeared on the ballot, alongside Independents Bob Quast, Ruth Smith and Rick Stewart. Ernst defeated Braley in the general election. This was the first open Senate seat in Iowa since 1974. Ernst was the first Republican to win this seat since Roger Jepsen in 1978. Ernst's inauguration marked the first time since 1985 in which Republicans held both United States Senate seats from Iowa.

== Democratic primary ==
Bruce Braley ultimately faced no opposition in his primary campaign and became the Democratic nominee on June 3, 2014.

=== Candidates ===
==== Declared ====
- Bruce Braley, U.S. representative from Iowa's 1st congressional district

==== Withdrew ====
- Bob Quast, businessman (running as an independent)

==== Declined ====
- Chet Culver, former governor of Iowa
- Jeff Danielson, state senator
- Tom Harkin, incumbent U.S. senator
- Dave Loebsack, U.S. representative from Iowa's 2nd congressional district (ran for re-election)
- Kevin McCarthy, minority leader of the Iowa House of Representatives
- Christie Vilsack, former First Lady of Iowa and nominee for Iowa's 4th congressional district in 2012
- Tom Vilsack, United States secretary of agriculture and former governor of Iowa

=== Endorsements ===
Bruce Braley

Federal politicians

- Leonard Boswell, former U.S. representative
- Bill Clinton, 42nd president of the United States
- Hillary Clinton, 67th United States secretary of state, 2008 presidential candidate, then-potential 2016 presidential candidate
- Tom Harkin, incumbent U.S. senator
- Dave Loebsack, U.S. representative

Statewide politicians

- Chet Culver, former governor of Iowa
- Michael Fitzgerald, Iowa state treasurer
- Tom Miller, Iowa attorney general

State legislators

- Ako Abdul-Samad, state representative
- Marti Anderson, state representative
- Daryl Beall, state senator
- Bruce Bearinger, state representative
- Deborah Berry, state representative
- Dennis Black, state senator
- Joe Bolkcom, state senator
- Tod Bowman, state senator
- Chris Brase, state senator
- Dennis Cohoon, state representative
- Thomas G. Courtney, state senator
- Jeff Danielson, state senator
- David Dawson, state representative
- Dick Dearden, state senator
- Bill Dotzler, state senator
- Nancy Dunkel, state representative
- Robert Dvorsky, state senator
- John Forbes, state representative
- Ruth Ann Gaines, state representative
- Mary Gaskill, state representative
- Michael Gronstal, majority leader of the Iowa Senate and chairman of the Democratic Legislative Campaign Committee
- Chris Hall, state representative
- Curt Hanson, state representative
- Rita Hart, state senator
- Jack Hatch, state senator
- Lisa Heddens, state representative
- Rob Hogg, state senator
- Wally Horn, state senator
- Bruce Hunter, state representative
- Charles Isenhart, state representative
- David Jacoby, state representative
- Pam Jochum, president of the Iowa Senate
- Anesa Kajtazovic, state representative
- Jerry Kearns, state representative
- Dan Kelley, state representative
- Bob Kressig, state representative
- Vicki Lensing, state representative
- Daniel Lundby, state representative
- Jim Lykam, state representative
- Mary Mascher, state representative
- Liz Mathis, state senator
- Matt McCoy, state senator
- Helen Miller, state representative
- Dan Muhlbauer, state representative
- Jo Oldson, state representative
- Rick Olson, state representative
- Tyler Olson, state representative
- Scott Ourth, state representative
- Janet Petersen, state senator
- Todd Prichard, state representative
- Herman Quirmbach, state senator
- Amanda Ragan, state senator
- Joe Riding, state representative
- Patti Ruff, state representative
- Kirsten Running-Marquardt, state representative
- Brian Schoenjahn, state senator
- Joe Seng, state senator
- Mark Smith, state representative
- Steve Sodders, president pro tempore of the Iowa Senate
- Art Staed, state representative
- Sharon S. Steckman, state representative
- Sally Stutsman, state representative
- Rich Taylor, state senator
- Todd Taylor, state representative
- Phyllis Thede, state representative
- Roger Thomas, state representative
- Beth Wessel-Kroeschell, state representative
- Mary Jo Wilhelm, state senator
- Cindy Winckler, state representative
- Mary Wolfe, state representative
- Frank Wood, state representative

=== Polling ===
Hypothetical polling

Poll source	Date(s) administered	Sample size	Margin of error	Brad Anderson	Bruce Braley	Kevin McCarthy	Undecided
Harper Polling	January 29, 2013	?	?	3.83%	49.73%	3.83%	42.62%

=== Results ===
Democratic primary results
Party	Candidate	Votes	%
Democratic	Bruce Braley	62,623	99.2%
Democratic	Write-ins	504	0.8%
Total votes		63,127	100.0%

== Republican primary ==
The Republican primary was held on June 3, 2014. If no candidate won more than 35% of the vote, the nominee would have been chosen at a statewide convention. It would have been only the second time in 50 years that a convention picked a nominee and the first time since 2002, when then-State Senator Steve King won a convention held in Iowa's 5th congressional district to decide the Republican nominee for Congress. Having the nominee chosen by a convention led to fears that the increasingly powerful Ron Paul faction of the state party, led by Party Chairman A. J. Spiker, could have nominated an unelectable candidate.

The convention was scheduled to be held on June 14 but was then moved to July 12. Republican leaders, including Governor Terry Branstad and U.S. Senator Chuck Grassley, as well as four of the candidates for the nomination, criticized the move. Candidates Sam Clovis, Joni Ernst, Matthew Whitaker and David Young signed a letter to the Republican Party of Iowa asking them to move the convention date back, saying that "Essentially gifting [Bruce] Braley an additional 30 days to campaign in a vacuum, while reducing our nominee's time to raise funds and campaign as the general election candidate by an entire month – only serves to strengthen Braley's viability". Spiker responded that the move was necessary to accommodate the 27-day period that the Iowa secretary of state's office requires to certify the results of the primary. Spiker reiterated his position in September 2013, rejecting calls for a vote by the central committee to move the convention date. He said that nominating a candidate before the primary had been certified would break state law, "which outlines that a ballot vacancy does not exist until the canvass is completed and certified."

Secretary of State Matt Schultz was highly critical of Spiker, saying that "no political party should use the excuse of the final date of the statewide canvass to determine the date of its special nominating convention. Furthermore, to state that it is necessary to hold a special nominating convention after the conclusion of the state canvass is not only misleading, it is false." Following efforts by members of the central committee to call a special meeting to move the date back to June, Spiker agreed and a meeting was held on September 23. The central committee voted 16–1 to move the convention date back to June 14. Statewide Republican leaders and activists and members of the National Republican Senatorial Committee believe that the real reason for the attempt to delay the convention was to give the Ron Paul faction time to organize an insurgent effort to push through a candidate they support, which could have even been Spiker himself or State Party Co-chair David Fischer. The infighting has been traced back to the failure of the NRSC and allies of Governor Branstad and Senator Grassley to recruit a "top-tier" candidate for the race.

Ernst received widespread attention for a campaign ad she released in March 2014 where she employed a tongue-in-cheek comparison between her experience castrating pigs and her ability to cut "pork" in Congress. Many found the ad to be humorous and it was spoofed by late-night comedians including Jimmy Fallon and Stephen Colbert, while some found it to be in bad taste. Before the ad aired, Ernst had struggled in fundraising, and two polls of the Republican primary taken in February 2014 had shown her in second place, several points behind opponent Mark Jacobs. After it aired, a Suffolk University poll in early April showed her with a narrow lead and a Loras College poll showed her essentially tied with Jacobs. By May, she was being described by the media as the "strong front-runner".

In May 2014, Roll Call reported that the Republican primary campaign had become a proxy for the 2016 Republican presidential nomination, with Mitt Romney and Marco Rubio supporting Ernst, Rick Perry endorsing Whitaker and Rick Santorum backing Clovis. Jacobs, who had no such high-profile endorsements, ran as the "outsider".

Ultimately, Ernst won the primary with 56% of the vote, negating the need for a convention.

=== Candidates ===
==== Declared ====
- Sam Clovis, radio host
- Joni Ernst, state senator
- Mark Jacobs, former CEO of Reliant Energy
- Scott Schaben, businessman
- Matthew Whitaker, former U.S. attorney for the Southern District of Iowa and nominee for treasurer of Iowa in 2002

==== Withdrew ====
- Paul Lunde, attorney and nominee for Iowa's 4th congressional district in 1988 and 1992
- David Young, former chief of staff to U.S. Senator Chuck Grassley (ran for U.S. House)

==== Declined ====
- Terry Branstad, governor of Iowa
- Bob Brownell, Polk County supervisor
- Steve Deace, radio talk show host
- Bill Dix, minority leader of the Iowa Senate
- David Fischer, co-chair of the Republican Party of Iowa
- Steve Gaer, mayor of West Des Moines
- Drew Ivers, finance chairman of the Republican Party of Iowa
- Steve King, U.S. representative from Iowa's 4th congressional district
- Ron Langston, businessman and former director of the Minority Business Development Agency
- Tom Latham, U.S. representative
- Bill Northey, Iowa secretary of agriculture
- Kevin O'Brien, McDonald's store owner and operator
- Kim Reynolds, lieutenant governor of Iowa
- Rod Roberts, director of the Iowa Department of Inspections and Appeals and candidate for governor in 2010
- Matt Schultz, Iowa secretary of state
- A. J. Spiker, chairman of the Republican Party of Iowa
- Matt Strawn, former chairman of the Republican Party of Iowa
- Bob Vander Plaats, social conservative activist, candidate for governor in 2002, 2006 and 2010 and nominee for lieutenant governor in 2006
- David A. Vaudt, chairman of the Governmental Accounting Standards Board and former state auditor of Iowa
- Stuart Weinstein, orthopaedic surgeon, president of the American Academy of Orthopaedic Surgeons
- Brad Zaun, state senator

=== Endorsements ===
Sam Clovis

Individuals

- Terry Amann, pastor at Walnut Creek Church
- Dorie Day, widow of Colonel Bud Day
- Steve Deace, radio talk show host
- Louie Gohmert, U.S. representative (TX-01)
- Rick Santorum, former U.S. representative and former U.S. senator (PA), candidate for president in 2012
- Phyllis Schlafly, conservative activist and founder of the Eagle Forum
- Bob Vander Plaats, social conservative activist, candidate for governor in 2002, 2006 and 2010 and nominee for lieutenant governor in 2006

Organizations

- Citizens United
- Eagle Forum
- Gun Owners of America
- Tea Party Patriots
Joni Ernst

National figures

- George H. W. Bush, 41st president of the United States
- Deb Fischer, U.S. senator (NE)
- Sarah Palin, former Alaska governor, 2008 Republican vice-presidential candidate
- Michael Reagan, son of Ronald Reagan
- Mitt Romney, former governor of Massachusetts and 2012 Republican presidential nominee
- Marco Rubio, U.S. senator (FL)
- Kay Orr, former governor of Nebraska

Statewide politicians

- Kim Reynolds, lieutenant governor of Iowa

State legislators

- Rich Anderson, former state representative
- Robert Bacon, state representative
- Clel Baudler, state representative
- Nancy Boettger, state senator
- Mark Brandenburg, state representative
- Mark Costello, state representative
- Cecil Dolecheck, state representative
- Dean Fisher, state representative
- Shawn Hamerlinck, former state senator
- Megan Hess, state representative
- Hubert Houser, state senator
- David Johnson, state senator
- Tim Kapucian, state senator
- Renee Schulte, former state representative
- Amy Sinclair, state senator
- Rob Taylor, state representative
- Dan Zumbach, state senator

Local officials

- Chad Airhart, Dallas County recorder
- Jon McAvoy, Adel city councilman
- Isaiah McGee, Waukee city councilman
- Carol Robertson, Mills County auditor
- Renee Twedt, Story County treasurer

Organizations

- Right Now Women PAC
- Senate Conservatives Fund
- ShePAC
- United States Chamber of Commerce
- VOICES of Conservative Women
Mark Jacobs

Individuals

- Bill Northey, Iowa secretary of agriculture
Matthew Whitaker
- Brad Banks, former Iowa Hawkeyes quarterback
- Robert Brownell, Polk County supervisor
- Scott Cirksena, mayor of Clive
- Creighton Cox, Urbandale city councilman
- Greg Ganske, former U.S. representative
- Bill Gustoff, Republican State Central Committee member
- Chris Hagenow, state representative
- Kevin Koester, state representative
- Matt Mead, governor of Wyoming
- John Mickelson, West Des Moines city councilman
- Rick Perry, governor of Texas and candidate for president in 2012
- Jim Peters, mayor of Adel
- Ralph Watts, state representative
- Jack Whitver, state senator

=== Polling ===
Poll source	Date(s) administered	Sample size	Margin of error	Sam Clovis	Joni Ernst	Mark Jacobs	Paul Lunde	Scott Schaben	Matthew Whitaker	Other	Undecided
Hill Research Consultants*	February 12–13, 2014	300	± 4%	6%	11%	22%	—	—	8%	3%	50%
Public Policy Polling	February 20–23, 2014	283	± 5.8%	8%	13%	20%	3%	3%	11%	—	42%
Suffolk University	April 3–8, 2014	224	± 6.55%	6.7%	25%	22.77%	—	1.34%	4.02%	—	40.18%
Loras College	April 7–8, 2014	600	± 4%	7.3%	18.1%	18.8%	—	3.5%	4%	—	48.2%
Harper Polling^	April 30 – May 1, 2014	500	± 4.38%	14%	33%	23%	—	1%	3%	—	26%
Loras College	May 12–13, 2014	600	± 4%	9.5%	30.8%	19.3%	—	2.3%	7.3%	—	30.7%
Public Policy Polling	May 15–19, 2014	303	± ?	14%	34%	18%	2%	1%	6%	—	26%
Des Moines Register	May 27–30, 2014	400	± 4.9%	11%	36%	18%	—	2%	13%	—	16%

- ^ Internal poll for Joni Ernst campaign
- * Internal poll for Mark Jacobs campaign
Hypothetical polling

Poll source	Date(s) administered	Sample size	Margin of error	Sam Clovis	Joni Ernst	Mark Jacobs	Paul Lunde	Scott Shaben	Bob Vander Plaats	Matthew Whitaker	David Young	Undecided
The Polling Company	November 22–23, 2013	400	± 4.9%	8%	8%	5%	1%	1%	28%	7%	4%	39%

Poll source	Date(s) administered	Sample size	Margin of error	Drew Ivers	Steve King	Tom Latham	Bill Northey	Kim Reynolds	Matt Schultz	Bob Vander Plaats	David Vaudt	Brad Zaun	Undecided
Public Policy Polling	February 1–3, 2013	326	± 5.4%	—	41%	22%	—	10%	—	9%	—	—	17%
Public Policy Polling	February 1–3, 2013	326	± 5.4%	—	42%	23%	—	—	—	19%	—	—	15%
Public Policy Polling	February 1–3, 2013	326	± 5.4%	—	50%	27%	—	—	—	—	—	—	23%
Wenzel Strategies	February 1–2, 2013	800	± 3.44%	—	34.3%	18.7%	3.2%	9.8%	1.4%	9.2%	0.5%	—	19.5%
Wenzel Strategies	February 1–2, 2013	800	± 3.44%	—	42.9%	34.7%	—	—	—	—	—	—	22.4%
Harper Polling	January 29, 2012			4.52%	31.16%	26.13%	—	—	—	16.08%	—	6.03%	16.08%
Harper Polling	January 29, 2012			—	35.35%	21.72%	—	—	—	19.70%	—	3.03%	20.20%
Harper Polling	January 29, 2012			—	46%	29%	—	—	—	—	—	—	25%

=== Results ===
Results by county: Ernst: 30–40%; 40–50%; 50–60%; 60–70%; 70–80%; 80–90%; 90–100%; Clovis: 40–50%; 50–60%; 60–70%; 70–80%; Jacobs: 40–50%

Republican primary results
Party	Candidate	Votes	%
Republican	Joni Ernst	88,692	56.12%
Republican	Sam Clovis	28,434	17.99%
Republican	Mark Jacobs	26,582	16.82%
Republican	Matthew Whitaker	11,909	7.54%
Republican	Scott Schaben	2,270	1.44%
Republican	Write-ins	144	0.09%
Total votes		158,031	100.00%

== General election ==
=== Endorsements ===
Bruce Braley (D)

Federal politicians

- Leonard Boswell, former U.S. representative (IA)
- Bill Clinton, 42nd president of the United States
- Hillary Clinton, 67th United States secretary of state, 2008 presidential candidate, then-potential 2016 presidential candidate
- Tom Harkin, incumbent U.S. senator (IA)
- Dave Loebsack, U.S. representative (IA)

Statewide politicians

- Chet Culver, former governor of Iowa
- Michael Fitzgerald, Iowa state treasurer
- Tom Miller, Iowa attorney general

Organizations

- NARAL Pro-Choice America

State legislators

- Ako Abdul-Samad, state representative
- Marti Anderson, state representative
- Daryl Beall, state senator
- Bruce Bearinger, state representative
- Deborah Berry, state representative
- Dennis Black, state senator
- Joe Bolkcom, state senator
- Tod Bowman, state senator
- Chris Brase, state senator
- Dennis Cohoon, state representative
- Thomas G. Courtney, state senator
- Jeff Danielson, state senator
- David Dawson, state representative
- Dick Dearden, state senator
- Bill Dotzler, state senator
- Nancy Dunkel, state representative
- Robert Dvorsky, state senator
- John Forbes, state representative
- Ruth Ann Gaines, state representative
- Mary Gaskill, state representative
- Michael Gronstal, majority leader of the Iowa Senate and chairman of the Democratic Legislative Campaign Committee
- Chris Hall, state representative
- Curtis Hanson, state representative
- Rita Hart, state senator
- Jack Hatch, state senator
- Lisa Heddens, state representative
- Rob Hogg, state senator
- Wally Horn, state senator
- Bruce Hunter, state representative
- Charles Isenhart, state representative
- David Jacoby, state representative
- Pam Jochum, president of the Iowa Senate
- Anesa Kajtazovic, state representative
- Jerry Kearns, state representative
- Dan Kelley, state representative
- Bob Kressig, state representative
- Vicki Lensing, state representative
- Daniel Lundby, state representative
- Jim Lykam, state representative
- Mary Mascher, state representative
- Liz Mathis, state senator
- Matt McCoy, state senator
- Helen Miller, state representative
- Dan Muhlbauer, state representative
- Jo Oldson, state representative
- Rick Olson, state representative
- Tyler Olson, state representative
- Scott Ourth, state representative
- Janet Petersen, state senator
- Todd Prichard, state representative
- Herman Quirmbach, state senator
- Amanda Ragan, state senator
- Joe Riding, state representative
- Patti Ruff, state representative
- Kirsten Running-Marquardt, state representative
- Brian Schoenjahn, state senator
- Joe Seng, state senator
- Mark Smith, state representative
- Steve Sodders, president pro tempore of the Iowa Senate
- Art Staed, state representative
- Sharon S. Steckman, state representative
- Sally Stutsman, state representative
- Rich Taylor, state senator
- Todd Taylor, state representative
- Phyllis Thede, state representative
- Roger Thomas, state representative
- Beth Wessel-Kroeschell, state representative
- Mary Jo Wilhelm, state senator
- Cindy Winckler, state representative
- Mary Wolfe, state representative
- Frank Wood, state representative

=== Debates ===
On August 29, Ernst and Braley announced their agreement to hold three televised debates in Davenport, Des Moines, and Sioux City, the first debate on September 28, the second on October 11, and the last on October 16.

- Complete video of debate, October 16, 2014

=== Fundraising ===
Candidate	Raised	Spent	Cash on hand
Bruce Braley (D)	$9,918,362	$10,069,945	$707,302
Joni Ernst (R)	$9,206,690	$7,660,912	$2,244,366

=== Predictions ===
Source	Ranking	As of
The Cook Political Report	Tossup	November 3, 2014
Sabato's Crystal Ball	Lean R (flip)	November 3, 2014
Rothenberg Political Report	Tossup	November 3, 2014
Real Clear Politics	Tossup	November 3, 2014

=== Polling ===
Poll source	Date(s) administered	Sample size	Margin of error	Bruce Braley (D)	Joni Ernst (R)	Other	Undecided
Public Policy Polling	November 1–3, 2014	1,265	± 2.8%	45%	48%	2%	5%
Public Policy Polling	November 1–3, 2014	1,265	± 2.8%	46%	49%	—	5%
Quinnipiac University	October 28 – November 2, 2014	778	± 3.5%	47%	47%	2%	4%
Public Policy Polling	October 30–31, 2014	617	± ?	47%	48%	—	5%
Selzer & Co/Des Moines Register	October 28–31, 2014	701	± 3.7%	44%	51%	1%	4%
YouGov	October 25–31, 2014	1,112	± 4.4%	43%	42%	3%	13%
Fox News	October 28–30, 2014	911	± 3%	44%	45%	4%	8%
Rasmussen Reports	October 28–30, 2014	990	± 3%	47%	48%	3%	3%
CNN/ORC	October 27–30, 2014	647 LV	± 4%	47%	49%	—	4%
CNN/ORC	October 27–30, 2014	887 RV	± 3.5%	49%	43%	—	7%
Reuters/Ipsos	October 23–29, 2014	1,129	± 3.3%	45%	45%	4%	7%
Quinnipiac	October 22–27, 2014	817	± 3.4%	45%	49%	2%	5%
Loras College	October 21–24, 2014	1,121	± 2.93%	45%	44%	2%	8%
CBS News/NYT/YouGov	October 16–23, 2014	2,322	± 3%	44%	44%	1%	11%
NBC News/Marist	October 18–22, 2014	772 LV	± 3.5%	46%	49%	1%	4%
NBC News/Marist	October 18–22, 2014	1,052 RV	± 3%	46%	46%	2%	6%
Gravis Marketing	October 20–21, 2014	964	± 3%	43%	49%	—	8%
Monmouth University	October 18–21, 2014	423	± 4.8%	46%	47%	5%	2%
Quinnipiac University	October 15–21, 2014	964	± 3.2%	46%	48%	3%	4%
Public Policy Polling	October 15–16, 2014	714	± ?%	48%	47%	—	5%
Suffolk University	October 11–14, 2014	500	± 4.4%	43%	47%	2%	7%
Quinnipiac University	October 8–13, 2014	967	± 3.2%	45%	47%	3%	5%
Rasmussen Reports	October 8–10, 2014	957	± 3%	45%	48%	1%	5%
Selzer & Co/Des Moines Register	October 3–8, 2014	1,000	± 3.1%	46%	47%	3%	4%
Morey Group	October 4–7, 2014	1,000	± 3.1%	39%	38%	2%	21%
Magellan	October 3, 2014	1,299	± 2.8%	41%	50%	—	9%
Loras College	October 1–3, 2014	600	± 4%	42%	42%	4%	12%
NBC News/Marist	September 27 – October 1, 2014	778 LV	± 3.5%	44%	46%	1%	9%
NBC News/Marist	September 27 – October 1, 2014	1,093 RV	± 3%	45%	44%	1%	11%
Greenberg Quinlan Rosner	September 25 – October 1, 2014	1,000	± 2.09%	44%	45%	11%	
CBS News/NYT/YouGov	September 20 – October 1, 2014	2,359	± 2%	44%	43%	1%	12%
Gravis Marketing	September 29–30, 2014	522	± 4%	41%	50%	—	10%
Greenberg Quinlan Rosner	September 25–30, 2014	800	± 3.46%	47%	46%	—	7%
Public Policy Polling	September 25–28, 2014	1,192	± 2.8%	42%	44%	4%	10%
Public Policy Polling	September 25–28, 2014	1,192	± 2.8%	43%	45%	—	12%
Harstad Research	September 21–25, 2014	809	± ?	42%	42%	—	16%
Selzer & Co/Des Moines Register	September 21–24, 2014	546	± 4.2%	38%	44%	6%	12%
Rasmussen Reports	September 17–18, 2014	750	± 4%	43%	43%	4%	14%
Fox News	September 14–16, 2014	600	± 4%	41%	41%	6%	12%
Quinnipiac University	September 10–15, 2014	1,167	± 2.9%	44%	50%	1%	4%
CNN/ORC	September 8–10, 2014	608 LV	± 4%	49%	48%	1%	2%
CNN/ORC	September 8–10, 2014	904 RV	± 3.5%	50%	42%	—	7%
Loras College	September 2–5, 2014	1,200	± 2.82%	45%	41%	—	14%
CBS News/NYT/YouGov	August 18 – September 2, 2014	1,764	± 3%	44%	42%	2%	13%
Public Policy Polling	August 28–30, 2014	816	± 3.4%	43%	45%	—	12%
Suffolk	August 23–26, 2014	500	± 4%	40%	40%	5%	15%
Public Policy Polling	August 22–24, 2014	915	± 3.2%	41%	40%	5%	14%
Public Policy Polling	August 22–24, 2014	915	± 3.2%	42%	42%	—	16%
Rasmussen Reports	August 11–12, 2014	750	± 4%	43%	43%	6%	8%
CBS News/NYT/YouGov	July 5–24, 2014	2,056	± 2.7%	45%	46%	2%	8%
Gravis Marketing	July 17–18, 2014	1,179	± 3%	44%	43%	—	13%
NBC News/Marist	July 7–13, 2014	1,599	± 2.5%	43%	43%	1%	14%
Quinnipiac University	June 12–16, 2014	1,277	± 2.7%	44%	40%	—	16%
Vox Populi Polling	June 4–5, 2014	665	± 3.8%	44%	49%	—	7%
Loras College	June 4–5, 2014	600	± 4%	42%	48%	—	10%
Rasmussen Reports	June 4–5, 2014	750	± 4%	44%	45%	3%	9%
Public Policy Polling	May 15–19, 2014	914	± 3.3%	45%	39%	—	16%
Hickman Analytics	April 24–30, 2014	500	± 4.4%	44%	40%	—	16%
Suffolk University	April 3–8, 2014	800	± 3.5%	38%	30%	—	33%
Rasmussen Reports	March 24–25, 2014	750	± 4%	40%	37%	—	23%
Quinnipiac University	March 5–10, 2014	1,411	± 2.6%	42%	29%	1%	27%
Public Policy Polling	February 20–23, 2014	869	± 3.3%	41%	35%	—	23%
Quinnipiac University	December 10–15, 2013	1,617	± 2.4%	44%	38%	1%	17%
Harper Polling	November 23–24, 2013	985	± 3.12%	42%	36%	—	22%
Public Policy Polling	July 5–7, 2013	668	± 3.8%	45%	33%	—	22%

Hypothetical polling

with Braley

Poll source	Date(s) administered	Sample size	Margin of error	Bruce Braley (D)	Mark Jacobs (R)	Other	Undecided
Public Policy Polling	May 15–19, 2014	914	± 3.3%	42%	36%	—	22%
Hickman Analytics	April 24–30, 2014	500	± 4.4%	43%	42%	—	15%
Magellan Strategies	April 14–15, 2014	808	± 3.45%	40%	41%	7%	12%
Suffolk University	April 3–8, 2014	800	± 3.5%	37%	31%	—	33%
Rasmussen Reports	March 24–25, 2014	750	± 4%	41%	38%	—	21%
Quinnipiac University	March 5–10, 2014	1,411	± 2.6%	40%	31%	1%	28%
Public Policy Polling	February 20–23, 2014	869	± 3.3%	41%	35%	—	24%
Quinnipiac University	December 10–15, 2013	1,617	± 2.4%	46%	37%	1%	16%
Harper Polling	November 23–24, 2013	985	± 3.12%	41%	37%	—	22%
Public Policy Polling	July 5–7, 2013	668	± 3.8%	44%	32%	—	24%

Poll source	Date(s) administered	Sample size	Margin of error	Bruce Braley (D)	Scott Schaben (R)	Other	Undecided
Suffolk University	April 3–8, 2014	800	± 3.5%	38%	25%	—	38%

Poll source	Date(s) administered	Sample size	Margin of error	Bruce Braley (D)	Matthew Whitaker (R)	Other	Undecided
Public Policy Polling	May 15–19, 2014	914	± 3.3%	43%	36%	—	21%
Suffolk University	April 3–8, 2014	800	± 3.5%	38%	27%	—	35%
Rasmussen Reports	March 24–25, 2014	750	± 4%	40%	36%	—	24%
Quinnipiac University	March 5–10, 2014	1,411	± 2.6%	42%	30%	1%	26%
Public Policy Polling	February 20–23, 2014	869	± 3.3%	40%	34%	—	26%
Quinnipiac University	December 10–15, 2013	1,617	± 2.4%	43%	40%	1%	17%
Harper Polling	November 23–24, 2013	985	± 3.12%	41%	38%	—	22%
Public Policy Polling	July 5–7, 2013	668	± 3.8%	43%	34%	—	23%

Poll source	Date(s) administered	Sample size	Margin of error	Bruce Braley (D)	Steve King (R)	Other	Undecided
Public Policy Polling	February 1–3, 2013	846	± 3.4%	49%	38%	—	13%
Harper Polling	January 29, 2013	523	± 4.3%	39%	34%	—	27%

Poll source	Date(s) administered	Sample size	Margin of error	Bruce Braley (D)	Sam Clovis (R)	Other	Undecided
Public Policy Polling	May 15–19, 2014	914	± 3.3%	43%	34%	—	23%
Suffolk University	April 3–8, 2014	800	± 3.5%	38%	25%	—	36%
Rasmussen Reports	March 24–25, 2014	750	± 4%	44%	31%	—	25%
Quinnipiac University	March 5–10, 2014	1,411	± 2.6%	42%	27%	1%	29%
Public Policy Polling	February 20–23, 2014	869	± 3.3%	42%	34%	—	24%
Quinnipiac University	December 10–15, 2013	1,617	± 2.4%	45%	34%	1%	20%
Harper Polling	November 23–24, 2013	985	± 3.12%	40%	35%	—	25%
Public Policy Polling	July 5–7, 2013	668	± 3.8%	43%	31%	—	25%
Public Policy Polling	February 1–3, 2013	846	± 3.4%	49%	38%	—	13%
Harper Polling	January 29, 2013	523	± 4.3%	39%	34%	—	27%

Poll source	Date(s) administered	Sample size	Margin of error	Bruce Braley (D)	Tom Latham (R)	Other	Undecided
Public Policy Polling	February 1–3, 2013	846	± 3.4%	44%	41%	—	15%
Harper Polling	January 29, 2013	523	± 4.3%	33%	36%	—	31%

Poll source	Date(s) administered	Sample size	Margin of error	Bruce Braley (D)	Kim Reynolds (R)	Other	Undecided
Public Policy Polling	February 1–3, 2013	846	± 3.4%	44%	37%	—	19%

Poll source	Date(s) administered	Sample size	Margin of error	Bruce Braley (D)	Bob Vander Plaats (R)	Other	Undecided
Quinnipiac University	December 10–15, 2013	1,617	± 2.4%	46%	40%	1%	14%
Public Policy Polling	February 1–3, 2013	846	± 3.4%	51%	33%	—	16%
Harper Polling	January 29, 2013	523	± 4.3%	41%	26%	—	32%

Poll source	Date(s) administered	Sample size	Margin of error	Bruce Braley (D)	David Young (R)	Other	Undecided
Quinnipiac University	December 10–15, 2013	1,617	± 2.4%	44%	36%	1%	19%
Harper Polling	November 23–24, 2013	985	± 3.12%	41%	35%	—	24%
Public Policy Polling	July 5–7, 2013	668	± 3.8%	45%	32%	—	24%

with Culver

Poll source	Date(s) administered	Sample size	Margin of error	Chet Culver (D)	Steve King (R)	Other	Undecided
Public Policy Polling	February 1–3, 2013	846	± 3.4%	48%	41%	—	11%

Poll source	Date(s) administered	Sample size	Margin of error	Chet Culver (D)	Tom Latham (R)	Other	Undecided
Public Policy Polling	February 1–3, 2013	846	± 3.4%	41%	45%	—	13%

Poll source	Date(s) administered	Sample size	Margin of error	Chet Culver (D)	Kim Reynolds (R)	Other	Undecided
Public Policy Polling	February 1–3, 2013	846	± 3.4%	42%	41%	—	17%

Poll source	Date(s) administered	Sample size	Margin of error	Chet Culver (D)	Bob Vander Plaats (R)	Other	Undecided
Public Policy Polling	February 1–3, 2013	846	± 3.4%	50%	36%	—	14%

with Harkin

Poll source	Date(s) administered	Sample size	Margin of error	Tom Harkin (D)	Terry Branstad (R)	Other	Undecided
Public Policy Polling	May 3–6, 2012	1,181	± 2.85%	46%	41%	—	12%

Poll source	Date(s) administered	Sample size	Margin of error	Tom Harkin (D)	Steve King (R)	Other	Undecided
Public Policy Polling	May 3–6, 2012	1,181	± 2.85%	48%	37%	—	15%
Public Policy Polling	October 7–10, 2011	749	± 3.6%	49%	42%	—	9%

Poll source	Date(s) administered	Sample size	Margin of error	Tom Harkin (D)	Tom Latham (R)	Other	Undecided
Public Policy Polling	May 3–6, 2012	1,181	± 2.85%	46%	37%	—	17%
Public Policy Polling	October 7–10, 2011	749	± 3.6%	45%	42%	—	13%

with Loebsack

Poll source	Date(s) administered	Sample size	Margin of error	Dave Loebsack (D)	Steve King (R)	Other	Undecided
Public Policy Polling	February 1–3, 2013	846	± 3.4%	47%	40%	—	13%

Poll source	Date(s) administered	Sample size	Margin of error	Dave Loebsack (D)	Tom Latham (R)	Other	Undecided
Public Policy Polling	February 1–3, 2013	846	± 3.4%	40%	43%	—	17%

Poll source	Date(s) administered	Sample size	Margin of error	Dave Loebsack (D)	Kim Reynolds (R)	Other	Undecided
Public Policy Polling	February 1–3, 2013	846	± 3.4%	41%	39%	—	20%

Poll source	Date(s) administered	Sample size	Margin of error	Dave Loebsack (D)	Bob Vander Plaats (R)	Other	Undecided
Public Policy Polling	February 1–3, 2013	846	± 3.4%	49%	34%	—	17%

with Vilsack

Poll source	Date(s) administered	Sample size	Margin of error	Tom Vilsack (D)	Steve King (R)	Other	Undecided
Public Policy Polling	February 1–3, 2013	846	± 3.4%	49%	39%	—	11%

Poll source	Date(s) administered	Sample size	Margin of error	Tom Vilsack (D)	Tom Latham (R)	Other	Undecided
Public Policy Polling	February 1–3, 2013	846	± 3.4%	46%	42%	—	12%

Poll source	Date(s) administered	Sample size	Margin of error	Tom Vilsack (D)	Kim Reynolds (R)	Other	Undecided
Public Policy Polling	February 1–3, 2013	846	± 3.4%	46%	38%	—	16%

Poll source	Date(s) administered	Sample size	Margin of error	Tom Vilsack (D)	Bob Vander Plaats (R)	Other	Undecided
Public Policy Polling	February 1–3, 2013	846	± 3.4%	52%	35%	—	14%

=== Results ===
United States Senate election in Iowa, 2014
Party	Candidate	Votes	%	±%
Republican	Joni Ernst	588,575	52.10%	+14.84%
Democratic	Bruce Braley	494,370	43.76%	−18.90%
Independent	Rick Stewart	26,815	2.37%	N/A
Libertarian	Douglas Butzier	8,232	0.73%	N/A
Independent	Bob Quast	5,873	0.52%	N/A
Independent	Ruth Smith	4,724	0.42%	N/A
Write-in		1,111	0.10%	+0.02%
Total votes		1,129,700	100.00%	N/A
Republican gain from Democratic				

==== Counties that flipped from Democratic to Republican ====
- Adair (largest city: Greenfield)
- Adams (largest city: Corning)
- Allamakee (largest city: Waukon)
- Appanoose (largest city: Centerville)
- Audubon (largest city: Audubon)
- Benton (largest city: Vinton)
- Boone (largest city: Boone)
- Bremer (largest city: Waverly)
- Buchanan (largest city: Independence)
- Buena Vista (largest city: Storm Lake)
- Butler (largest city: Parkersburg)
- Calhoun (largest city: Rockwell City)
- Carroll (largest city: Carroll)
- Cass (largest city: Atlantic)
- Cedar (largest city: Tipton)
- Cherokee (largest city: Cherokee)
- Chickasaw (largest city: New Hampton)
- Clarke (largest city: Osceola)
- Clay (largest city: Spencer)
- Clayton (largest city: Guttenberg)
- Crawford (largest city: Denison)
- Dallas (largest city: Waukee)
- Davis (largest city: Bloomfield)
- Decatur (largest city: Lamoni)
- Delaware (largest city: Manchester)
- Dickinson (largest city: Spirit Lake)
- Emmet (largest city: Estherville)
- Fayette (largest city: Oelwein)
- Franklin (largest city: Hampton)
- Fremont (largest city: Sidney)
- Greene (largest city: Jefferson)
- Grundy (largest city: Grundy Center)
- Guthrie (largest city: Guthrie Center)
- Hamilton (largest city: Webster City)
- Hancock (largest city: Garner)
- Hardin (largest city: Iowa Falls)
- Harrison (largest city: Missouri Valley)
- Henry (largest city: Mount Pleasant)
- Humboldt (largest city: Humboldt)
- Ida (largest city: Ida Grove)
- Iowa (largest city: Williamsburg)
- Jackson (largest city: Maquoketa)
- Jasper (largest city: Newton)
- Jones (largest city: Anamosa)
- Keokuk (largest city: Sigourney)
- Kossuth (largest city: Algona)
- Louisa (largest city: Wapello)
- Lucas (largest city: Chariton)
- Madison (largest city: Winterset)
- Mahaska (largest city: Oskaloosa)
- Marion (largest city: Pella)
- Marshall (largest city: Marshalltown)
- Mills (largest city: Glenwood)
- Mitchell (largest city: Osage)
- Monona (largest city: Onawa)
- Monroe (largest city: Albia)
- Montgomery (largest city: Red Oak)
- Muscatine (largest city: Muscatine)
- Palo Alto (largest city: Emmetsburg)
- Plymouth (largest city: Le Mars)
- Pocahontas (largest city: Pocahontas)
- Pottawattamie (largest city: Council Bluffs)
- Poweshiek (largest city: Grinnell)
- Ringgold (largest city: Mount Ayr)
- Sac (largest city: Sac City)
- Scott (largest city: Davenport)
- Shelby (largest city: Harlan)
- Tama (largest city: Tama)
- Taylor (largest city: Bedford)
- Union (largest city: Creston)
- Van Buren (largest city: Keosauqua)
- Wapello (largest city: Ottumwa)
- Warren (largest city: Indianola)
- Washington (largest city: Washington)
- Wayne (largest city: Corydon)
- Webster (largest city: Fort Dodge)
- Winnebago (largest city: Forest City)
- Winneshiek (largest city: Decorah)
- Woodbury (largest city: Sioux City)
- Wright (largest city: Eagle Grove)

==== By congressional district ====
Ernst won all four congressional districts, including one held by a Democrat.

District	Ernst	Braley	Representative
1st	48.3%	47.87%	Rod Blum
2nd	48.91%	47.06%	Dave Loebsack
3rd	52.19%	43.89%	David Young
4th	59.43%	36.17%	Steve King

== See also ==
- 2014 United States Senate elections
- 2014 United States elections
- 2014 United States House of Representatives elections in Iowa
- 2014 Iowa gubernatorial election
