= 2014 United States House of Representatives elections in Iowa =

- November 4, 2014

All 4 Iowa seats to the United States House of Representatives
	Majority party	Minority party
Party	Republican	Democratic
Last election	2	2
Seats won	3	1
Seat change	▲1	▼1
Popular vote	595,865	509,189
Percentage	53.19%	45.45%
Swing	▲5.92%	▼4.81%

Republican
50–60%
60–70%
70–80%
80–90%
Democratic
40–50%
50–60%
60–70%

The 2014 United States House of Representatives elections in Iowa were held on Tuesday, November 4, 2014, to elect the four U.S. representatives from the state of Iowa, one from each of the state's four congressional districts. The elections coincided with the elections of other federal and state offices, including governor of Iowa and United States Senate. Primary elections were held on June 4, 2014. As no candidate won more than 35% of the vote in the 3rd district Republican primary, that nomination was decided at a party convention on June 21.

== Overview ==
2014 United States House of Representatives elections in Iowa
Party	Votes	Percentage	Seats before	Seats after	+/–
Republican	595,865	53.19%	2	3	+1
Democratic	509,189	45.45%	2	1	-1
Libertarian	9,054	0.81%	0	0	-
Independents	4,360	0.39%	0	0	—
Write-ins	1,866	0.17%	0	0	—
Totals	1,120,334	100.00%	4	4	-

=== By district ===
Results of the 2014 United States House of Representatives elections in Iowa by district:

District	Republican		Democratic		Others		Total		Result
District	Votes	%	Votes	%	Votes	%	Votes	%	Result
District 1	147,762	51.07%	141,145	48.79%	399	0.14%	289,306	100%	Republican gain
District 2	129,455	47.36%	143,431	52.48%	443	0.16%	273,329	100%	Democratic hold
District 3	148,814	52.76%	119,109	42.23%	14,143	5.01%	282,066	100%	Republican hold
District 4	169,834	61.62%	105,504	38.28%	295	0.11%	275,633	100%	Republican hold
Total	595,865	53.19%	509,189	45.45%	15,280	1.36%	1,120,334	100%	

== District 1 ==
2014 Iowa's 1st congressional district election
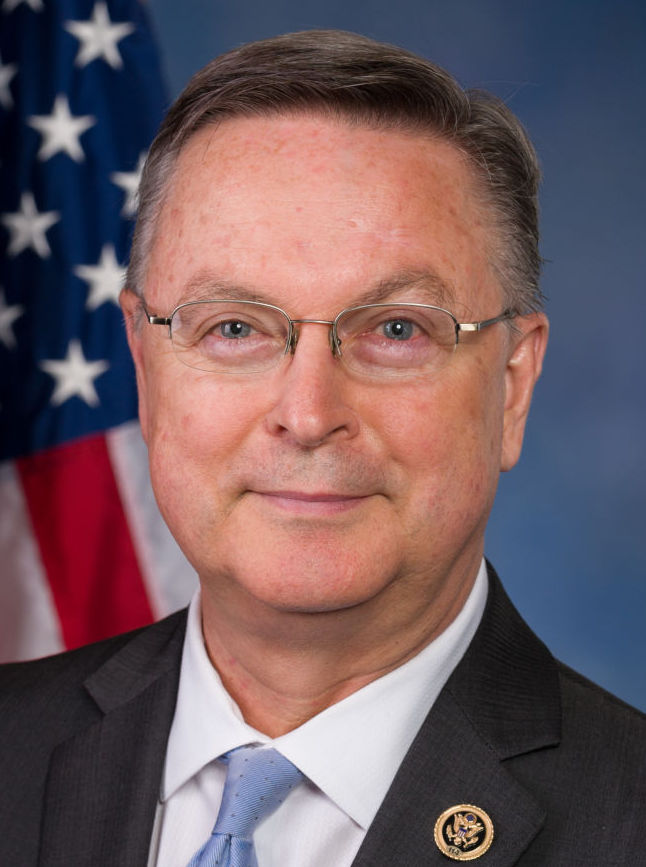

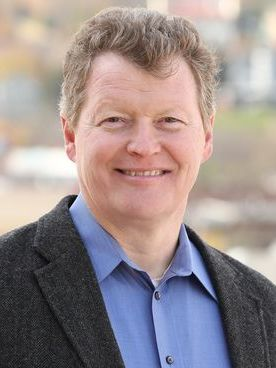
Nominee	Rod Blum	Pat Murphy
Party	Republican	Democratic
Popular vote	147,762	141,145
Percentage	51.1%	48.8%
- County results Blum: 50–60% 60–70% Vernon: 50–60%
U.S. Representatives before election
Bruce Braley
Democratic
Elected U.S. Representatives
Rod Blum
Republican

Democratic Representative Bruce Braley won re-election in 2012. He did not run for re-election in 2014, as he instead ran for the United States Senate seat being vacated by fellow Democrat Tom Harkin, who was retiring.

=== Democratic primary ===
==== Candidates ====
===== Nominee =====
- Pat Murphy, state representative and former Speaker of the Iowa House of Representatives

===== Eliminated in primary =====
- Swati Dandekar, member of the Iowa Utilities Board and former state senator
- Anesa Kajtazovic, state representative
- Dave O'Brien, attorney and candidate for Iowa's 6th congressional district in 1988
- Monica Vernon, Cedar Rapids city councilwoman

===== Declined =====
- Bruce Braley, incumbent U.S. representative (running for U.S. Senate)
- Jeff Danielson, state senator
- Pam Jochum, state senator
- Liz Mathis, state senator
- Tyler Olson, state representative and former chairman of the Iowa Democratic Party
- Steve Sodders, state senator

==== Endorsements ====
Swati Dandekar

State officials

- Patty Judge, former lieutenant governor of Iowa
Anesa Kajtazovic

State legislators

- Jeff Danielson, state senator
- Don Shoultz, former state representative

Labor unions

- United Food and Commercial Workers

Organizations

- WUFPAC

Individuals

- Tim Dwight, former NFL player and president of the Iowa Solar/Small Wind Energy Trade Association
- Zach Wahls, LGBT rights activist
Pat Murphy

Labor unions

- AFSCME Iowa Council 61
- Communication Workers of America Iowa State Council
- Dubuque Letter Carriers Local 257
- Great Plains Laborers' District Council
- International Union of Operating Engineers Local 234
- Iowa State Association of Letter Carriers
- Iowa Statewide American Postal Workers Union
- Iowa Statewide United Transportation Union (SMART Union)
- Retail Wholesale & Department Store Union Local 110
- Statewide Ironworkers Labor Union Local 89
- Teamsters Local 90
- Teamsters Local 120
Monica Vernon

State legislators

- Jean Hall Lloyd-Jones, former state senator

Labor unions

- Cedar Rapids/Iowa City Building Trades Council

==== Polling ====
Poll source	Date(s) administered	Sample size	Margin of error	Swati Dandekar	Anesa Kajtazovic	Pat Murphy	Dave O'Brien	Monica Vernon	Undecided
Loras College	May 14–15, 2014	300	± 5.7%	11%	9%	35%	3%	11%	30%
Loras College	April 10–11, 2014	300	± 5.7%	9%	11%	30%	6%	9%	35%
Myers Research (D-Murphy)	February 11–13, 2014	400	± 4.9%	13%	11%	36%	8%	17%	15%

==== Results ====
Democratic primary results
Party	Candidate	Votes	%
Democratic	Pat Murphy	10,189	36.7
Democratic	Monica Vernon	6,559	23.6
Democratic	Swati Dandekar	5,076	18.3
Democratic	Anesa Kajtazovic	4,067	14.7
Democratic	Dave O'Brien	1,846	6.7
Democratic	Write-ins	18	0.0
Total votes		27,755	100.0

=== Republican primary ===
==== Candidates ====
===== Nominee =====
- Rod Blum, businessman and candidate for this seat in 2012

===== Eliminated in primary =====
- Gail Boliver, attorney
- Steve Rathje, businessman

===== Withdrawn =====
- Walt Rogers, state representative

===== Declined =====
- Ben Lange, attorney and nominee for this seat in 2010 & 2012
- Paul Pate, former mayor of Cedar Rapids, former Iowa Secretary of State and former state senator (running for secretary of state)
- Kraig Paulsen, Speaker of the Iowa House of Representatives
- Renee Schulte, former state representative

==== Endorsements ====
Rod Blum

Individuals

- Steve Forbes, publishing executive and candidate for president in 1996 and 2000
Steve Rathje

Individuals

- Leon Mosley, former co-chair of the Republican Party of Iowa
Walt Rogers

U.S. senators

- Rick Santorum, former U.S. senator and candidate for president in 2012

U.S. representatives

- Jim Nussle, former U.S. representative and nominee for governor in 2006
- Tom Tauke, former U.S. representative

State legislators

- Dean Fisher, state representative
- Bob Hager, former state representative
- Lance Horbach, former state representative
- Dave Maxwell, state representative
- Brian Moore, state representative
- Dan Rasmussen, former state representative
- Quentin Stanerson, state representative

Organizations

- GOPAC

==== Polling ====
Poll source	Date(s) administered	Sample size	Margin of error	Rod Blum	Gail Boliver	Steve Rathje	Undecided
Loras College	May 15, 2014	300	± 5.65%	31%	2%	16%	51%
Loras College	April 8–9, 2014	300	± 5.65%	17%	2%	12%	69%

==== Results ====
Republican primary results
Party	Candidate	Votes	%
Republican	Rod Blum	16,886	54.9
Republican	Steve Rathje	11,420	37.1
Republican	Gail Boliver	2,413	7.9
Republican	Write-ins	42	0.1
Total votes		30,761	100.0

=== General election ===
==== Endorsements ====
Pat Murphy (D)

Labor unions

- American Federation of State, County and Municipal Employees
- American Postal Workers Union
- Communication Workers of America
- International Brotherhood of Teamsters
- International Union of Operating Engineers
- Laborers' International Union of North America
- National Association of Letter Carriers
- Retail Wholesale & Department Store Union
- United Transportation Union

Organizations

- Democratic Congressional Campaign Committee "Red to Blue" Program
Rod Blum (R)

Organizations

- National Republican Congressional Committee "Young Guns" Program

Individuals

- Steve Forbes, publishing executive and candidate for president in 1996 and 2000

==== Polling ====
Poll source	Date(s) administered	Sample size	Margin of error	Pat Murphy (D)	Rod Blum (R)	Undecided
Loras College	October 21–24, 2014	282	± 5.9%	42%	44%	14%
New York Times/CBS News Battleground Tracker	October 16–23, 2014	633	± 7.0%	47%	39%	14%
The Polling Company (R-Blum)	October 1–2, 2014	300	–	39%	40%	21%
Loras College	September 2–5, 2014	300	± 5.6%	35%	33%	32%
The Polling Company (R-Blum)	August 11–12, 2014	401	± 4.9%	40%	35%	24%
Myers Research (D-Murphy)	July 31–August 4, 2014	400	± 4.9%	51%	40%	8%

==== Predictions ====
Source	Ranking	As of
The Cook Political Report	Tossup	November 3, 2014
Rothenberg	Tossup	October 24, 2014
Sabato's Crystal Ball	Lean D	October 30, 2014
RCP	Tossup	November 2, 2014
Daily Kos Elections	Tossup	November 4, 2014

==== Results ====
Iowa's 1st congressional district, 2014
Party	Candidate	Votes	%
Republican	Rod Blum	147,762	51.1
Democratic	Pat Murphy	141,145	48.8
n/a	Write-ins	399	0.1
Total votes		289,306	100
Republican gain from Democratic			

== District 2 ==
2014 Iowa's 2nd congressional district election
- 2014
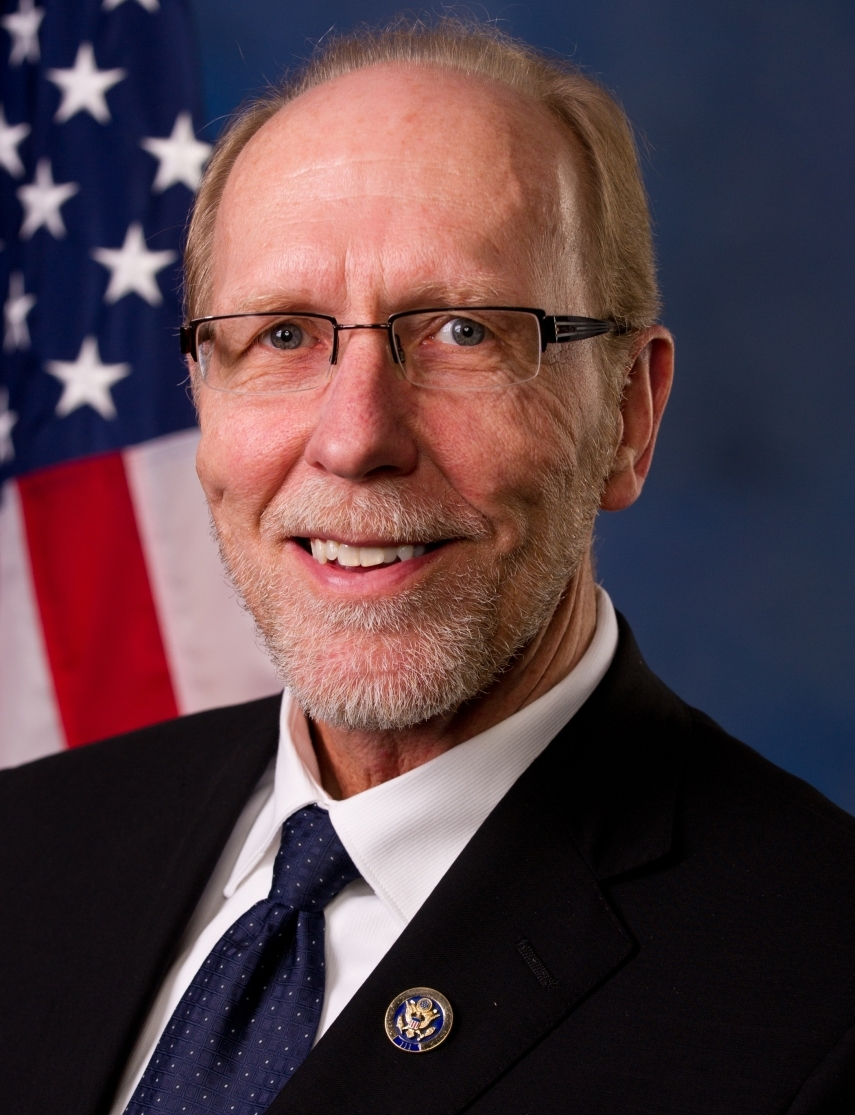

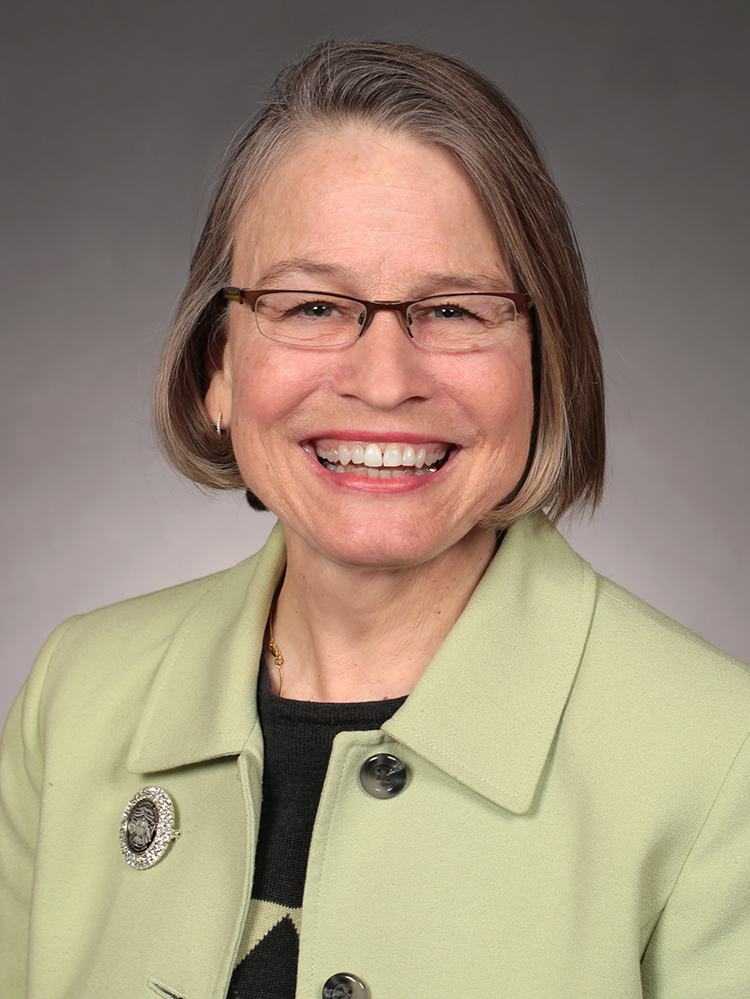
Nominee	Dave Loebsack	Mariannette Miller-Meeks
Party	Democratic	Republican
Popular vote	143,431	129,455
Percentage	52.5%	47.4%
- County results Loebsack: 50–60% 60–70% Peters: 50–60% 60–70%
U.S. Representative before election
Dave Loebsack
Democratic
Elected U.S. Representative
Dave Loebsack
Democratic

Democratic representative Dave Loebsack had represented Iowa's 2nd district since 2007. He was elected to a fourth term in 2012 against Republican John Archer with 56% of the vote.

=== Democratic primary ===
==== Candidates ====
===== Nominee =====
- Dave Loebsack, incumbent U.S. representative

==== Results ====
Democratic primary results
Party	Candidate	Votes	%
Democratic	Dave Loebsack (incumbent)	17,154	99.3
Democratic	Write-ins	117	0.7
Total votes		17,371	100

=== Republican primary ===
==== Candidates ====
===== Nominee =====
- Mariannette Miller-Meeks, ophthalmologist, former director of the Iowa Department of Public Health and nominee for the seat in 2008 and 2010

===== Eliminated in primary =====
- Mark Lofgren, state representative
- Matthew C. Waldren

==== Polling ====
Poll source	Date(s) administered	Sample size	Margin of error	Mark Lofgren	Mariannette Miller-Meeks	Matthew C. Waldren	Undecided
Loras College	May 13–14, 2014	300	± 5.65%	12%	36%	—	52%
Loras College	April 9–10, 2014	300	± 5.65%	11%	18%	1%	70%

==== Results ====
Republican primary results
Party	Candidate	Votes	%
Republican	Mariannette Miller-Meeks	15,043	49.4
Republican	Mark S. Lofgren	11,634	38.2
Republican	Matthew C. Waldren	3,746	12.3
Republican	Write-ins	52	0.1
Total votes		30,475	100.0

=== General election ===
==== Endorsements ====
Mariannette Miller-Meeks (R)

Organizations

- National Republican Congressional Committee "Young Guns" Program

==== Polling ====
Poll source	Date(s) administered	Sample size	Margin of error	Dave Loebsack (D)	Mariannette Miller-Meeks (R)	Undecided
Loras College	October 21–24, 2014	279	± 5.85%	51%	38%	11%
New York Times/CBS News Battleground Tracker	October 16–23, 2014	552	± 7.0%	49%	35%	16%
Loras College	September 2–5, 2014	300	± 5.6%	49%	32%	19%
The Tarrance Group (R-Miller-Meeks)	August 3–5, 2014	400	± 4.9%	45%	42%	13%

==== Predictions ====
Source	Ranking	As of
The Cook Political Report	Lean D	November 3, 2014
Rothenberg	Lean D	October 24, 2014
Sabato's Crystal Ball	Lean D	October 30, 2014
RCP	Lean D	November 2, 2014
Daily Kos Elections	Lean D	November 4, 2014

==== Results ====
Iowa's 2nd congressional district, 2014
Party	Candidate	Votes	%
Democratic	Dave Loebsack (incumbent)	143,431	52.5
Republican	Mariannette Miller-Meeks	129,455	47.4
n/a	Write-ins	443	0.1
Total votes		273,329	100.0
Democratic hold			

== District 3 ==
2014 Iowa's 3rd congressional district election
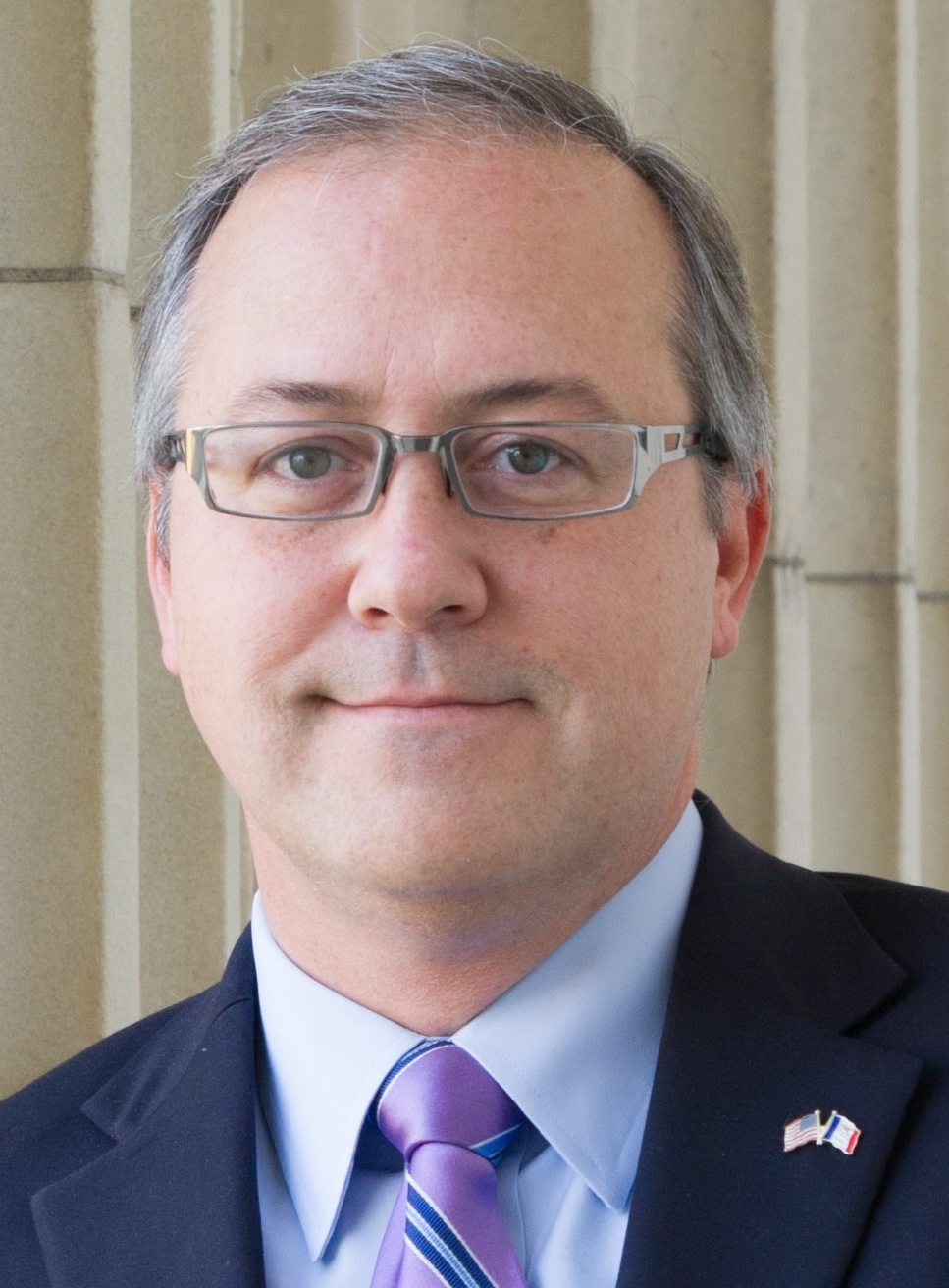

Nominee	David Young	Staci Appel
Party	Republican	Democratic
Popular vote	148,814	119,109
Percentage	52.8%	42.2%
- County results Young: 50–60% 60–70% 70–80% Appel: 40–50%
U.S. Representative before election
Tom Latham
Republican
Elected U.S. Representative
David Young
Republican

Prior to the 2012 elections, Republican Representative Tom Latham and Democratic Representative Leonard Boswell were redistricted into the same district. Though Barack Obama carried the district in the 2012 presidential election, Latham defeated Boswell. Latham planned to retire in 2014.

=== Republican primary ===
==== Candidates ====
===== Nominee =====
- David Young, former chief of staff to Senator Chuck Grassley and former candidate for the U.S. Senate

===== Eliminated in primary =====
- Robert Cramer, bridge construction contractor and chairman of the board of The Family Leader
- Joe Grandanette, teacher and business owner
- Matt Schultz, Iowa Secretary of State
- Monte Shaw, executive director of the Iowa Renewable Fuels Association
- Brad Zaun, state senator and nominee in 2010

===== Declined =====
- Jeff Ballenger, businessman and candidate for IA-05 in 2002
- Jake Chapman, state senator
- Peter Cownie, state representative
- Joni Ernst, state senator (running for the U.S. Senate)
- Brenna Findley, legal counsel for Governor Branstad and nominee for attorney general in 2010
- David Fischer, vice-chair of the Republican Party of Iowa
- Steve Gaer, mayor of West Des Moines
- Chris Hagenow, state representative
- Mary Ann Hanusa, state representative
- Mark Jacobs, former CEO of Reliant Energy (running for the U.S. Senate)
- Jeff Lamberti, former president of the Iowa Senate and nominee in 2006
- Tom Latham, incumbent U.S. representative
- Isaiah McGee, Waukee city councilman
- David Oman, businessman and candidate for governor in 1998
- Kim Reynolds, lieutenant governor of Iowa
- Charles Schneider, state senator
- Brent Siegrist, former Speaker of the Iowa House of Representatives
- Matt Strawn, former chairman of the Republican Party of Iowa
- Rob Taylor, state representative
- Bob Vander Plaats, social conservative activist, candidate for governor in 2002, 2006 and 2010 and nominee for lieutenant governor in 2006
- Matthew Whitaker, former U.S. Attorney for the Southern District of Iowa and nominee for Treasurer of Iowa in 2002 (running for the U.S. Senate)
- Jack Whitver, state senator

==== Endorsements ====
Robert Cramer

Individuals

- Steve Deace, talk radio host
Matt Schultz

U.S. senators

- Rick Santorum, former U.S. senator and candidate for president in 2012

State legislators

- Jake Chapman, state senator

Organizations

- FreedomWorks
- Patriot Voices PAC
David Young

U.S. representatives

- Jim Ross Lightfoot, former U.S. representative
- Tom Tauke, former U.S. representative

State officials

- Richard Johnson, former state auditor

Local officials

- Jerri Christman, Guthrie County auditor
- Joan Kirk, Fremont County auditor
- Gene Krumm, Dallas County auditor
- Carol Robertson, Mills County auditor

==== Polling ====
Poll source	Date(s) administered	Sample size	Margin of error	Robert Cramer	Joe Grandanette	Matt Schultz	Monte Shaw	David Young	Brad Zaun	Undecided
Loras College	May 14, 2014	300	± 5.65%	8%	2%	8%	5%	8%	17%	51%
Loras College	April 8–10, 2014	300	± 5.65%	7%	2%	8%	5%	3%	17%	59%

==== Results ====
Republican primary results
Party	Candidate	Votes	%
Republican	Brad Zaun	10,522	24.7
Republican	Robert Cramer	9,032	21.2
Republican	Matt Schultz	8,464	19.9
Republican	Monte Shaw	7,220	17.0
Republican	David Young	6,604	15.5
Republican	Joe Grandanette	661	1.6
Republican	Write-ins	42	0.1
Total votes		42,545	100.0

==== Convention ====
The Republican nomination was decided by a convention after none of the six candidates reached the 35 percent threshold required to make the general election ballot. This was the second time in 50 years that a convention picked a nominee and the first time since 2002, when then-State Senator Steve King won a convention held in Iowa's 5th congressional district to decide the Republican nominee for Congress. A poll conducted by the conservative website Caffeinated Thoughts of 118 of the 513 delegates was held on June 9–10. David Young and Brad Zaun took 27% each, with Robert Cramer on 19%, Monte Shaw on 14%, Matt Schultz on 8% and Joe Grandanette on 3% with another 3% undecided. 34% chose Young as their second choice, with 17% choosing Cramer, Schultz or Zaun, 10% picking Shaw and 3% picking Grandanette with 8% undecided.

On June 21, in what was described as a "stunning upset", David Young won the nomination on the fifth ballot of the convention.

On July 4, Zaun voiced his disappointment and suggested he would leave the Republican Party, leading some to encourage him to run for the seat as an independent. He had previously announced that he would introduce legislation to hold primary runoff elections instead of conventions. On July 10, Zaun announced that despite his frustrations, he would not leave the Republican Party or run as an independent.

Iowa Republican Convention, 2014
Candidate	Round 1		Round 2		Round 3		Round 4		Round 5	
David Young	86	(16.8%)	81	(15.8%)	102	(19.9%)	171	(33.3%)	276	(53.8%)
Brad Zaun	130	(25.3%)	157	(30.6%)	188	(36.6%)	206	(40.2%)	221	(43.1%)
Monte Shaw	118	(23%)	122	(23.8%)	126	(24.6%)	120	(23.4%)	—	
Matt Schultz	95	(18.5%)	88	(17.2%)	85	(16.6%)	—			
Robert Cramer	75	(14.6%)	60	(11.7%)	—					
Joe Grandanette	7	(1.4%)	2	(0.4%)	—					
Abstentions	2	(0.4%)	3	(0.6%)	12	(2.3%)	16	(3.1%)	16	(3.1%)
Total	513	(100%)	513	(100%)	513	(100%)	513	(100%)	513	(100%)

=== Democratic primary ===
==== Candidates ====
===== Nominee =====
- Staci Appel, former state senator

===== Withdrawn =====
- Gabriel De La Cerda, former tire factory worker
- Michael Sherzan, businessman

===== Declined =====
- Leonard Boswell, former U.S. representative
- Scott Brennan, chairman of the Iowa Democratic Party
- Frank Cownie, mayor of Des Moines
- Chet Culver, former governor
- Ed Fallon, former state representative, candidate for governor in 2006 and candidate for the seat in 2008
- Michael Gronstal, Majority Leader of the Iowa Senate
- Jack Hatch, state senator (running for Governor)
- Tom Henderson, attorney and chairman of the Polk County Democratic Party
- Tom Hockensmith, Polk County supervisor
- Michael Kiernan, former Des Moines city councilman and former chairman of the Iowa Democratic Party
- Bob Krause, former state representative, nominee for state treasurer in 1978, candidate for mayor of Waterloo in 1982 and candidate for the U.S. Senate in 2010
- Matt McCoy, state senator
- Andy McGuire, health insurance executive and candidate for Lieutenant Governor of Iowa in 2006
- Janet Petersen, state representative
- Dusky Terry, mayor of Earlham and candidate for Iowa Attorney General in 2006
- Christie Vilsack, former First Lady of Iowa and nominee for Iowa's 4th congressional district in 2012
- Tom Vilsack, United States Secretary of Agriculture and former governor of Iowa

==== Results ====
Democratic primary results
Party	Candidate	Votes	%
Democratic	Staci Appel	9,233	99.2
Democratic	Write-ins	75	0.8
Total votes		9,308	100.0

=== General election ===
==== Debate ====
2014 Iowa's 3rd congressional district debate
No.	Date	Host	Moderator	Link	Republican	Democratic
Key: P Participant A Absent N Not invited I Invited W Withdrawn						
Key: P Participant A Absent N Not invited I Invited W Withdrawn					David Young	Staci Appel
1	Sep. 11, 2014	Iowa Public Television	Dean Borg	C-SPAN	P	P

==== Endorsements ====
David Young (R)

U.S. representatives

- Jim Ross Lightfoot, former U.S. representative
- Tom Tauke, former U.S. representative

State officials

- Richard Johnson, former state auditor

Organizations

- National Republican Congressional Committee "Young Guns" Program
Staci Appel (D)

State legislators

- Marti Anderson, state senator
- Janet Petersen, state senator

Labor unions

- American Federation of State, County and Municipal Employees

Organizations

- Democratic Congressional Campaign Committee "Red to Blue" Program
- EMILY's List

Individuals

- Christie Vilsack, former First Lady of Iowa and nominee for Iowa's 4th congressional district in 2012

==== Polling ====
Poll source	Date(s) administered	Sample size	Margin of error	David Young (R)	Staci Appel (D)	Edward Wright (L)	Undecided
Loras College	October 21–24, 2014	280	± 5.9%	46%	44%	0%	10%
New York Times/CBS News Battleground Tracker	October 16–23, 2014	653	± 6.0%	40%	40%	1%	18%
Remington Research	October 11–13, 2014	663	± 3.8%	46%	42%	5%	7%
Greenberg Quinlan Rosner	October 1–2, 2014	400	± 4.9%	42%	49%	—	9%
Greenberg Quinlan Rosner	September 15–17, 2014	400	± 5%	44%	47%	—	9%
Loras College	September 2–5, 2014	300	± 5.6%	34%	40%	—	25%

==== Predictions ====
Source	Ranking	As of
The Cook Political Report	Tossup	November 3, 2014
Rothenberg	Tossup	October 24, 2014
Sabato's Crystal Ball	Lean R	October 30, 2014
RCP	Tossup	November 2, 2014
Daily Kos Elections	Tossup	November 4, 2014

==== Results ====
Iowa's 3rd congressional district, 2014
Party	Candidate	Votes	%
Republican	David Young	148,814	52.8
Democratic	Staci Appel	119,109	42.2
Libertarian	Edward Wright	9,054	3.2
Independent	Bryan Jack Holder	4,360	1.5
n/a	Write-ins	729	0.3
Total votes		282,066	100.0
Republican hold			

== District 4 ==
2014 Iowa's 4th congressional district election
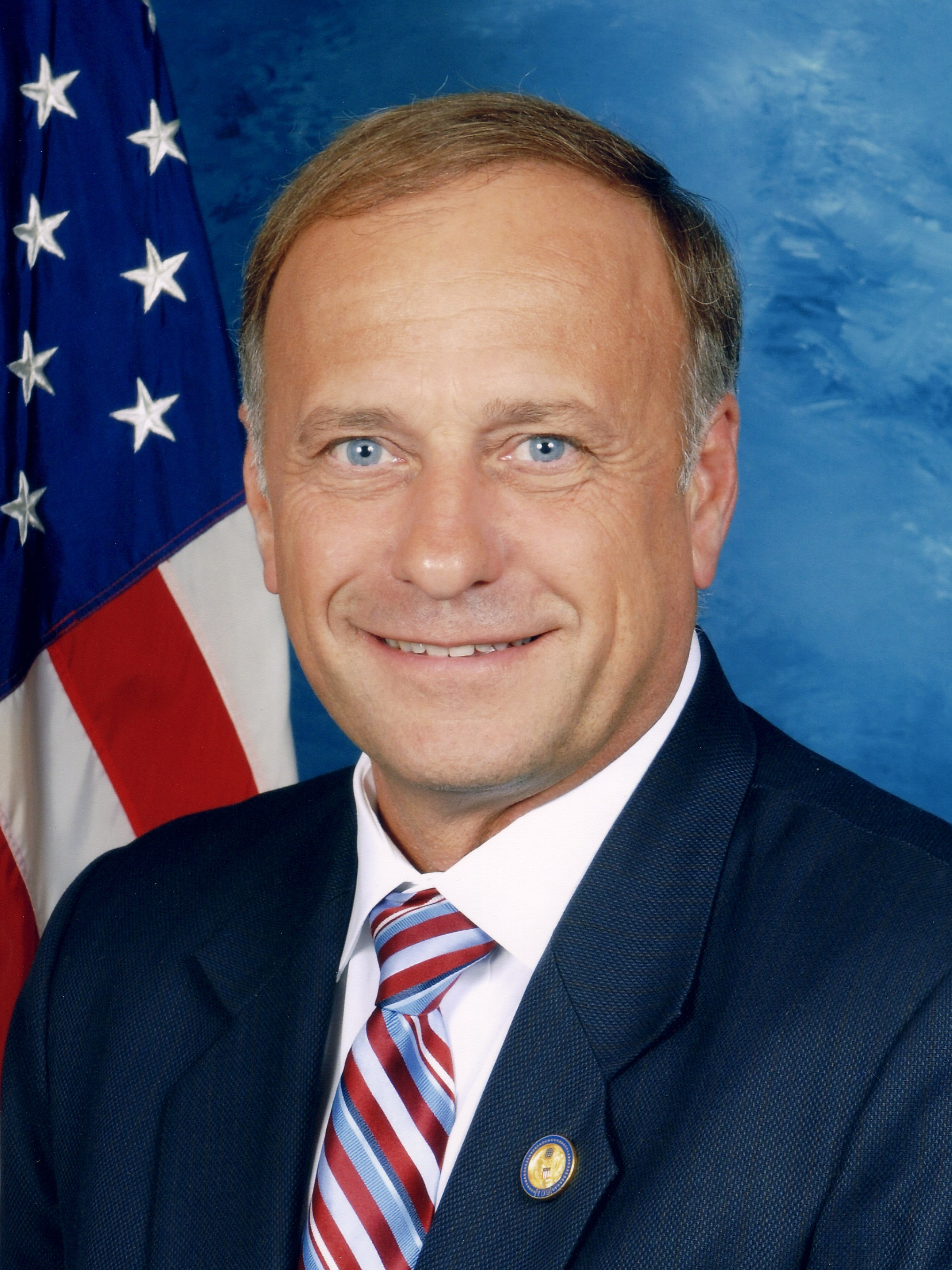

Nominee	Steve King	Jim Mowrer
Party	Republican	Democratic
Popular vote	169,834	105,504
Percentage	61.6%	38.3%
- County results King: 50–60% 60–70% 70–80% 80–90% Weaver: 50–60%
U.S. Representative before election
Steve King
Republican
Elected U.S. Representative
Steve King
Republican

Republican Representative Steve King won re-election in the 4th district in 2012, after serving in the now defunct Iowa's 5th congressional district.

=== Republican primary ===
==== Candidates ====
===== Nominee =====
- Steve King, incumbent U.S. representative

==== Results ====
Republican primary results
Party	Candidate	Votes	%
Republican	Steve King (incumbent)	43,098	99.1
Republican	Write-ins	382	0.9
Total votes		43,480	100.0

=== Democratic primary ===
==== Candidates ====
===== Nominee =====
- Jim Mowrer, veteran; former special assistant to the United States Under Secretary of the Army

===== Declined =====
- Christie Vilsack, former First Lady of Iowa and nominee for this seat in 2012

==== Results ====
Democratic primary results
Party	Candidate	Votes	%
Democratic	Jim Mowrer	9,900	99.6
Democratic	Write-ins	42	0.4
Total votes		9,942	100.0

=== General election ===
==== Endorsements ====
Jim Mowrer (D)

Organizations

- Democratic Congressional Campaign Committee "Red to Blue" Program

==== Debates ====
- Complete video of debate, October 23, 2014

==== Polling ====
Poll source	Date(s) administered	Sample size	Margin of error	Steve King (R)	Jim Mowrer (D)	Undecided
Loras College	October 21–24, 2014	280	± 5.85%	51%	39%	11%
New York Times/CBS News Battleground Tracker	October 16–23, 2014	484	± 7.0%	49%	41%	10%
The Polling Company (R-King)	October 1–2, 2014	407	± 4.9%	51%	38%	11%
DFM Research	September 20–23, 2014	450	± 4.6%	46%	43%	11%
Loras College	September 2–5, 2014	300	± 5.6%	47%	36%	17%

==== Predictions ====
Source	Ranking	As of
The Cook Political Report	Safe R	November 3, 2014
Rothenberg	Safe R	October 24, 2014
Sabato's Crystal Ball	Safe R	October 30, 2014
RCP	Likely R	November 2, 2014
Daily Kos Elections	Likely R	November 4, 2014

==== Results ====
Iowa's 4th congressional district, 2014
Party	Candidate	Votes	%
Republican	Steve King (incumbent)	169,834	61.6
Democratic	Jim Mowrer	105,504	38.3
n/a	Write-ins	295	0.1
Total votes		275,633	100.0
Republican hold			

== See also ==
- 2014 United States House of Representatives elections
- 2014 United States elections
