= Christie Vilsack =

American literary advocate and political candidate (born 1950)

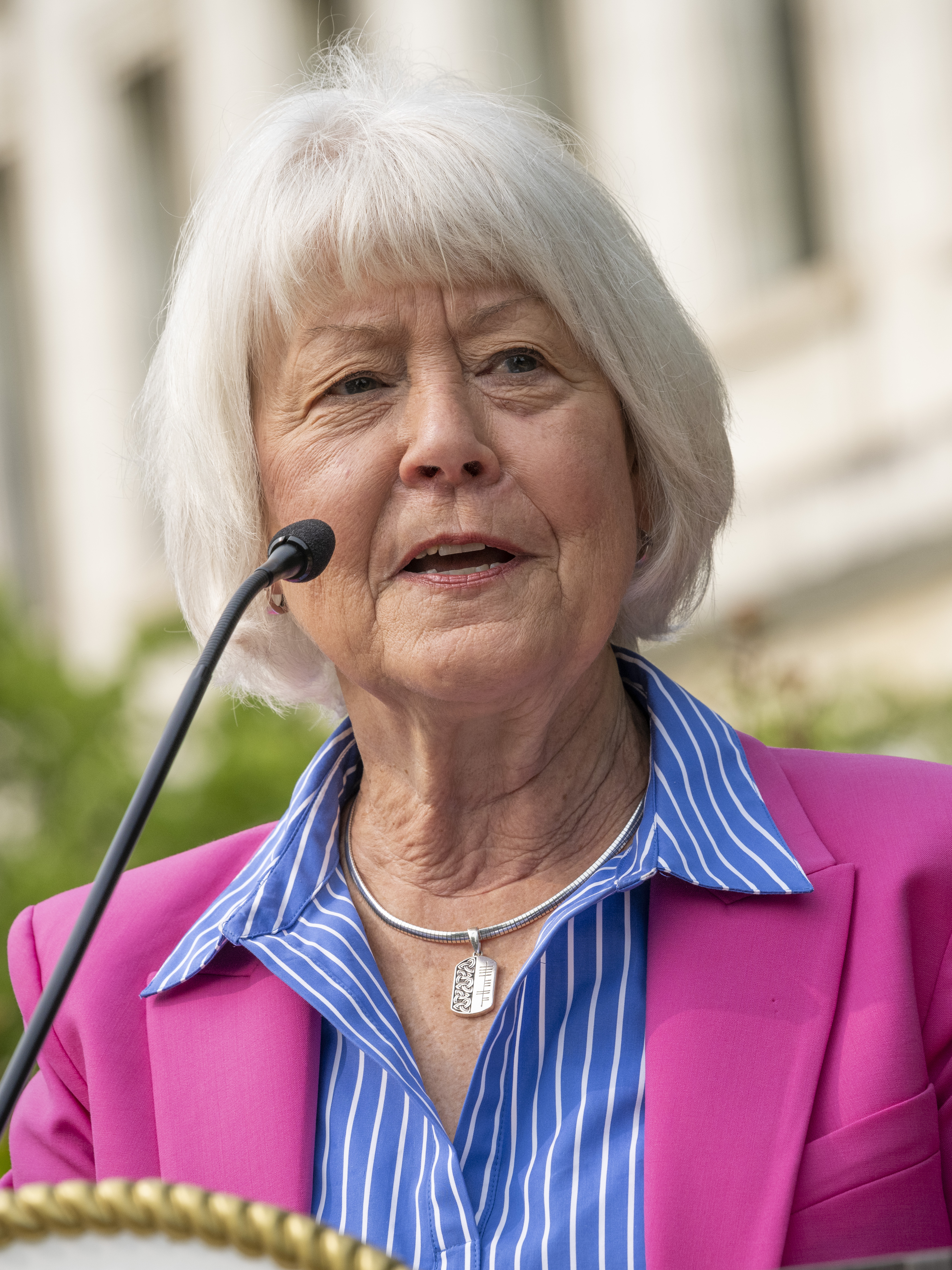
- Vilsack in 2023

First Lady of Iowa
- In role January 15, 1999 – January 12, 2007
- Governor: Tom Vilsack
- Preceded by: Christine Branstad
- Succeeded by: Mariclare Culver

Personal details
- Born: Ann Christine Bell; July 9, 1950 (age 76) Mount Pleasant, Iowa, U.S.
- Party: Democratic
- Spouse: Tom Vilsack (m. 1973)
- Children: 2
- Education: Kirkland College (BA)(DHL); University of Iowa (MA)

Ann Christine Bell Vilsack (née Bell; born July 9, 1950) is an American literacy advocate and political candidate who served as first lady of Iowa from 1999 to 2007. A member of the Democratic Party, Vilsack is married to former Iowa governor Tom Vilsack.

She unsuccessfully ran for Iowa's 4th congressional district in the 2012 election, losing to Republican incumbent Steve King.

== Early life, marriage, and family ==
Ann Christine Bell was born in Mount Pleasant, Iowa, where she was raised. She graduated from Kirkland College in Clinton, New York, in 1972 with a Bachelor's in Education and later earned a Master's in journalism from the University of Iowa in 1992. She was later presented with an honorary degree from Hamilton College, receiving "...the degree of Doctor of Humane Letters of Hamilton College, admitting you to all of its rights and privileges."

She met her future husband, Tom Vilsack, while attending college. He reportedly approached her in the cafeteria and asked, "Are you a Humphrey or a Nixon supporter?" The couple married on August 18, 1973, in Mount Pleasant. They have two children.

== Teaching career ==
The Vilsacks moved to Mount Pleasant in 1975. She began her career there as a teacher.

For 18 years she taught at the middle school level, and also at the high school level, leading classes in language arts and journalism. For another 6 years, she taught English and journalism at Iowa Wesleyan College. She worked as a reporter and columnist for the Mount Pleasant News. In April 2013, she joined USAID as the Senior Advisor for International Education.

== First Lady of Iowa ==
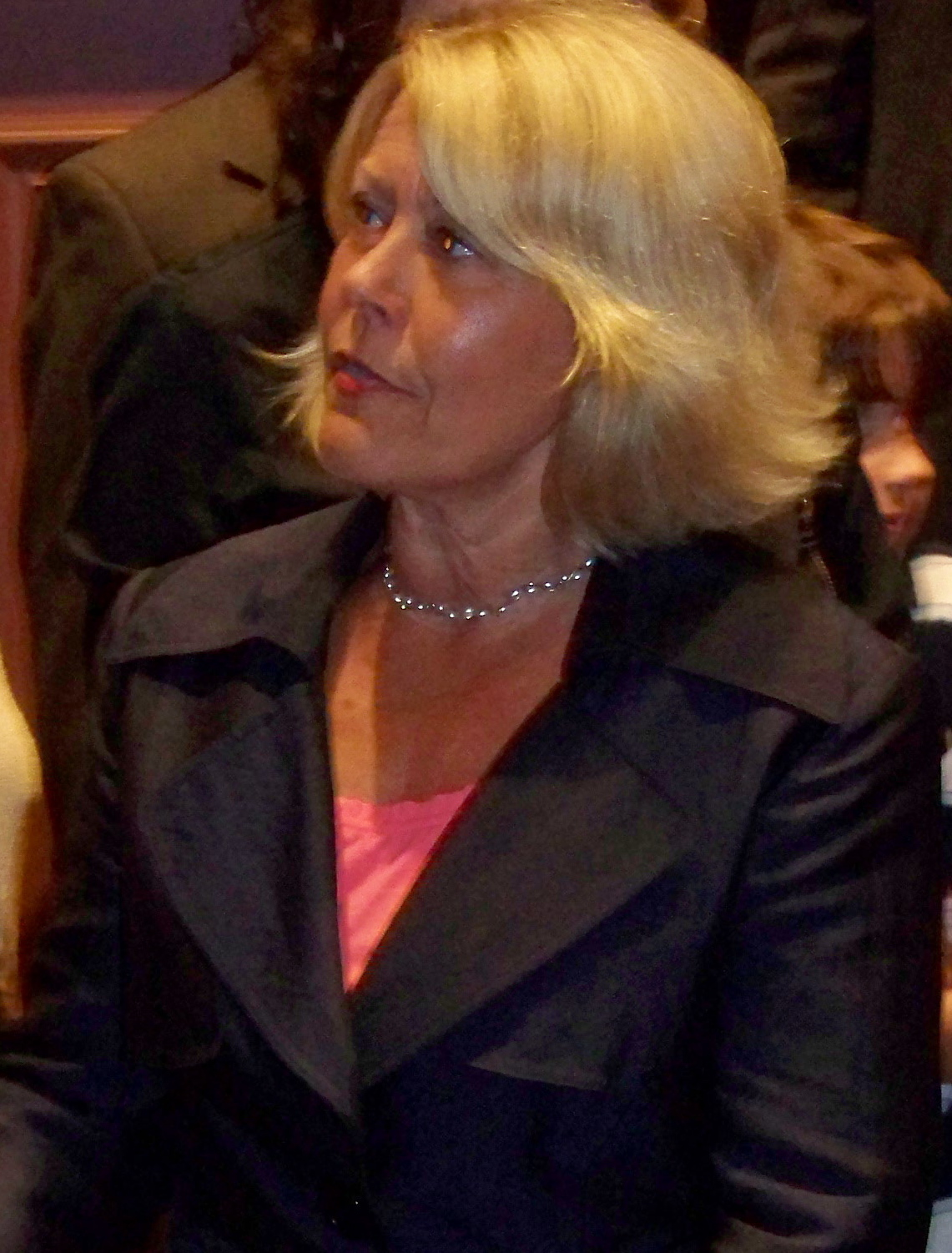
Vilsack in 2007

Christie Vilsack became First Lady of Iowa when her husband, Tom Vilsack was sworn in as governor in 1999. As First Lady, she focused on education and literacy issues.

As founder and president of the Vilsack Foundation, she partnered with the National Center for Family Literacy to promote media literacy with parents and their children. In 2007, Christie Vilsack founded The Iowa Initiative, a privately funded foundation which aims to reduce the rate of unintended pregnancies among Iowa women ages 18 to 30. She served as executive director of the Initiative until February 2011, when she resigned to focus on exploring opportunities for seeking elected office. She now serves as chair of the board of directors.

== Political career ==
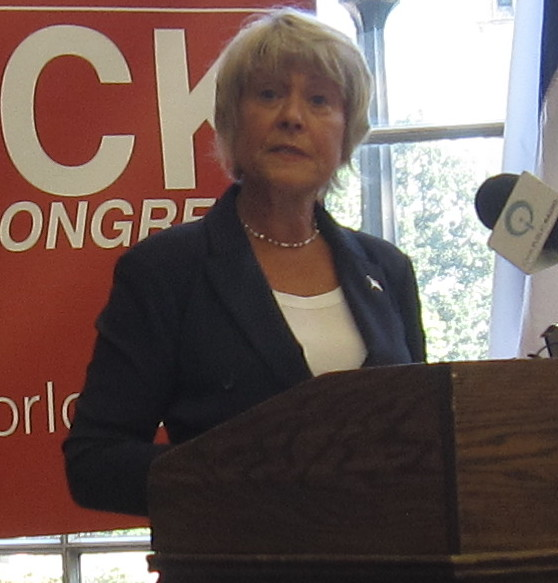
Vilsack announcing her 2012 congressional candidacy

In October 2009, Vilsack told WHO-DT she was considering a possible run against Republican incumbent U.S. senator Chuck Grassley in 2010. A Research 2000 poll for the website Daily Kos, conducted just days after the interview, showed that Grassley led Vilsack 51 to 40 percent in a hypothetical matchup, placing her in a statistical tie with the declared Democratic party candidates Roxanne Conlin and Bob Krause. She ultimately decided not to run.

In April 2011, Vilsack formed an exploratory committee to prepare for a potential campaign for Congress in Iowa's 4th District. She made her official announcement to run on July 19. On November 6, 2012, she was defeated by five-term Republican incumbent Steve King by just over 30,000 votes.

Vilsack considered running against King again in 2014 but took a job with the United States Agency for International Development as the Senior Advisor on International Education instead.

== Electoral history ==
2012 Iowa's 4th congressional district election
Party	Candidate	Votes	%
Republican	Steve King (incumbent)	200,063	52.9
Democratic	Christie Vilsack	169,470	44.9
Independent	Martin James Monroe	8,124	2.1
Write-in		226	0.1
Total votes		377,883	100.0
Republican hold			

Honorary titles
Preceded by Chris Branstad	First Lady of Iowa; 1999–2007	Succeeded by Mariclare Culver
