= 2012 United States House of Representatives elections in Iowa =

- November 6, 2012

All 4 Iowa seats to the United States House of Representatives
	Majority party	Minority party
Party	Democratic	Republican
Last election	3	2
Seats won	2	2
Seat change	▼1	Steady
Popular vote	772,387	726,505
Percentage	50.26%	47.27%
Swing	▲6.89%	▼6.72%

Democratic
40–50%
50–60%
60–70%
Republican
40–50%
50–60%
60–70%
70–80%
80–90%

The 2012 United States House of Representatives elections in Iowa were held on Tuesday, November 6, 2012, to elect the state's four U.S. representatives. The elections coincided with the elections of other federal and state offices, including a quadrennial presidential election. Primary elections were held on June 5, 2012.

The new congressional map, drawn by the state's Legislative Services Agency and passed with bipartisan support in the state House of Representatives and Senate, was signed into law by Governor Terry Branstad on April 19, 2011. Reflecting population shifts recorded in the 2010 United States census, the new map decreases Iowa's representation from five congressional districts to four.

== Overview ==
United States House of Representatives elections in Iowa, 2012
Party	Votes	Percentage	Seats before	Seats after	+/–
Democratic	772,387	50.26%	3	2	-1
Republican	726,505	47.27%	2	2	-
Socialist Workers	6,286	0.41%			-
Independent	30,291	1.97%			-
Write-In	1,380	0.09%			-
Totals	1,536,849	100%	5	4	-1

== District 1 ==
2012 Iowa's 1st congressional district election
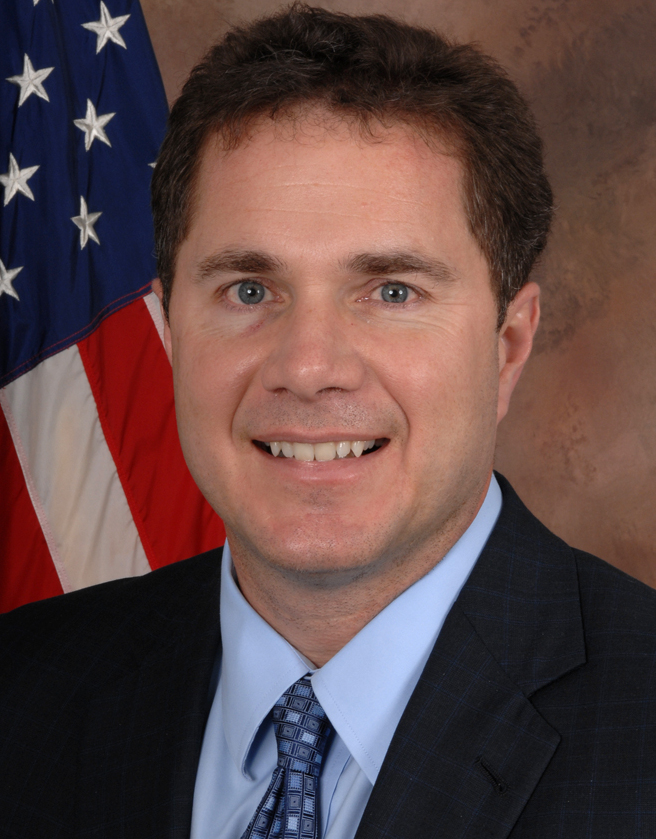

Nominee	Bruce Braley	Ben Lange
Party	Democratic	Republican
Popular vote	222,422	162,465
Percentage	56.9%	41.6%
- County results Braley: 40–50% 50–60% 60–70% Lange: 40–50% 50–60%
U.S. Representatives before election
Bruce Braley
Democratic
Elected U.S. Representatives
Bruce Braley
Democratic

Bruce Braley, a Democrat the incumbent representative from the 1st district in northeastern Iowa since 2007, ran in the new 1st district. Fellow incumbent Dave Loebsack, who lived within the boundaries of the new 1st district in Linn County, but who had represented southeastern Iowa's 2nd district since 2007, moved to Johnson County and ran in the new 2nd district. The 1st district has become more favorable to Democrats with the inclusion of Linn County and its loss of Scott County. Braley won the Democratic nomination unopposed.

=== Democratic primary ===
==== Candidates ====
===== Nominee =====
- Bruce Braley, incumbent U.S. Representative

===== Declined =====
- Dave Loebsack, incumbent U.S. Representative for the 2nd district

==== Primary results ====
Democratic primary results
Party	Candidate	Votes	%
Democratic	Bruce Braley (incumbent)	11,912	99.2
Democratic	Write-ins	92	0.8
Total votes		12,004	100.0

=== Republican primary ===
==== Candidates ====
===== Nominee =====
- Ben Lange, attorney and nominee for this seat in 2010

===== Eliminated in primary =====
- Rod Blum, businessman

===== Withdrawn =====
- Steve Rathje, businessman

==== Primary results ====
Republican primary results
Party	Candidate	Votes	%
Republican	Ben Lange	13,217	52.9
Republican	Rod Blum	11,551	46.2
Republican	Write-ins	143	0.9
Total votes		24,991	100.0

=== General election ===
==== Endorsements ====
Ben Lange (R)

Organizations

- National Republican Congressional Committee "Young Guns" Program

==== Predictions ====
Source	Ranking	As of
The Cook Political Report	Likely D	November 5, 2012
Rothenberg	Safe D	November 2, 2012
Roll Call	Safe D	November 4, 2012
Sabato's Crystal Ball	Likely D	November 5, 2012
NY Times	Safe D	November 4, 2012
RCP	Likely D	November 4, 2012
The Hill	Likely D	November 4, 2012

==== Results ====
Iowa's 1st congressional district, 2012
Party	Candidate	Votes	%
Democratic	Bruce Braley (incumbent)	222,422	56.9
Republican	Ben Lange	162,465	41.6
Independent	Gregory Hughes	4,772	1.2
Independent	George Todd Krail II	931	0.2
n/a	Write-ins	259	0.1
Total votes		390,849	100.0
Democratic hold			

== District 2 ==
2012 Iowa's 2nd congressional district election
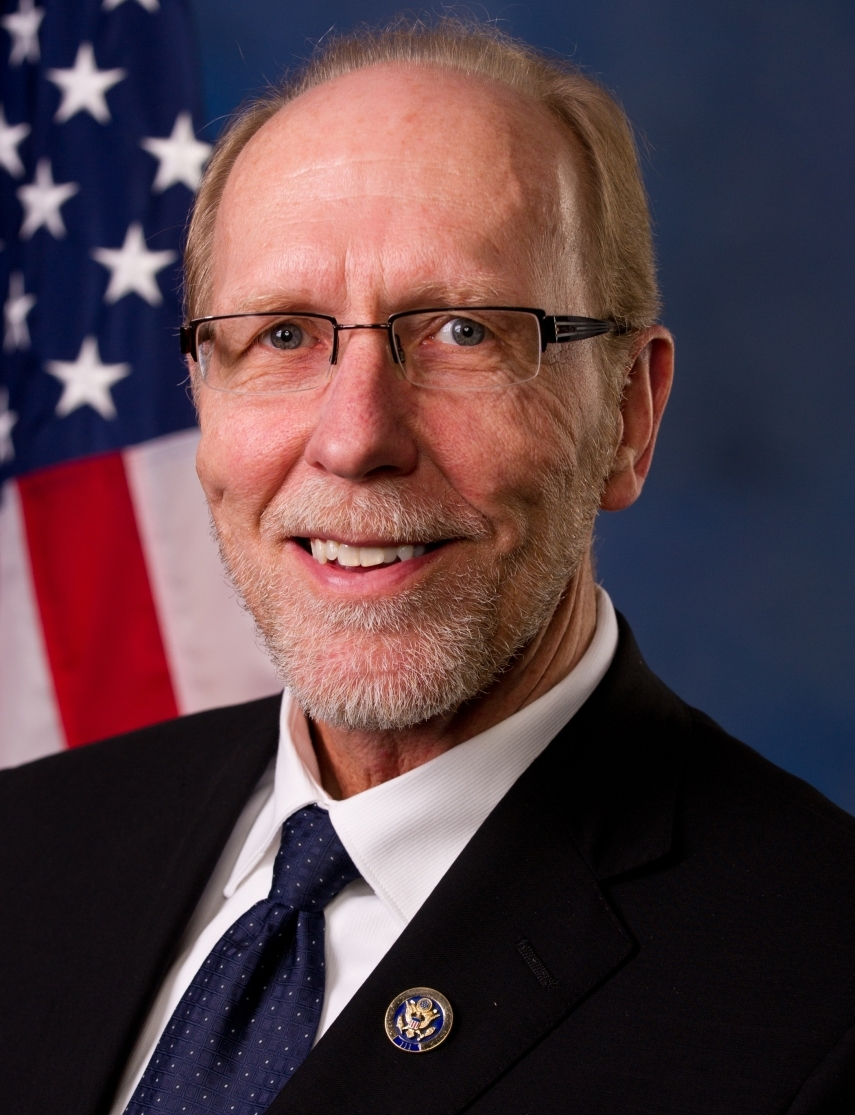

Nominee	Dave Loebsack	John Archer
Party	Democratic	Republican
Popular vote	211,863	161,977
Percentage	55.6%	42.5%
- County results Loebsack: 40–50% 50–60% 60–70% Archer: 40–50% 50–60% 60–70%
U.S. Representative before election
Dave Loebsack
Democratic
Elected U.S. Representative
Dave Loebsack
Democratic

None of Iowa's current members of Congress resided in the newly drawn 2nd district; however, Democrat Dave Loebsack moved from Linn County to Johnson County in order to avoid a primary against Bruce Braley and continue representing southeastern Iowa. The 2nd district became slightly more favorable to Republicans as a result of the inclusion of Scott County, but retains Democratic-leaning Johnson County.

=== Democratic primary ===
==== Candidates ====
===== Nominee =====
- Dave Loebsack, incumbent U.S. Representative

===== Eliminated in primary =====
- Joe Seng, state senator

==== Primary results ====
Democratic primary results
Party	Candidate	Votes	%
Democratic	Dave Loebsack (incumbent)	17,467	81.5
Democratic	Joe M. Seng	3,913	18.3
Democratic	Write-ins	39	0.2
Total votes		21,419	100.0

=== Republican primary ===
==== Candidates ====
===== Nominee =====
- John Archer, senior legal counsel at John Deere

===== Eliminated in primary =====
- Dan Dolan, housing developer

Withdrew

- Richard Gates, machinist and Tea Party activist

==== Primary results ====
Republican primary results
Party	Candidate	Votes	%
Republican	John Archer	16,604	60.5
Republican	Dan Dolan	10,775	39.3
Republican	Write-ins	57	0.2
Total votes		27,436	100.0

=== General election ===
==== Endorsements ====
Dave Loebsack (D)

Organizations

- Democratic Congressional Campaign Committee "Frontline" Program
John Archer (R)

Organizations

- National Republican Congressional Committee "Young Guns" Program

==== Polling ====
Poll source	Date(s) administered	Sample size	Margin of error	Dave Loebsack (D)	John Archer (R)	Undecided
Tarrance (R-Archer)	June 25–27, 2012	300 (LV)	± 5.7%	48%	43%	10%

==== Predictions ====
Source	Ranking	As of
The Cook Political Report	Likely D	November 5, 2012
Rothenberg	Likely D	November 2, 2012
Roll Call	Likely D	November 4, 2012
Sabato's Crystal Ball	Likely D	November 5, 2012
NY Times	Safe D	November 4, 2012
RCP	Likely D	November 4, 2012
The Hill	Lean D	November 4, 2012

==== Results ====
Iowa's 2nd congressional district, 2012
Party	Candidate	Votes	%
Democratic	Dave Loebsack (incumbent)	211,863	55.6
Republican	John Archer	161,977	42.5
Independent	Alan Aversa	7,112	1.8
n/a	Write-ins	323	0.1
Total votes		381,275	100.0
Democratic hold			

== District 3 ==
2012 Iowa's 3rd congressional district election
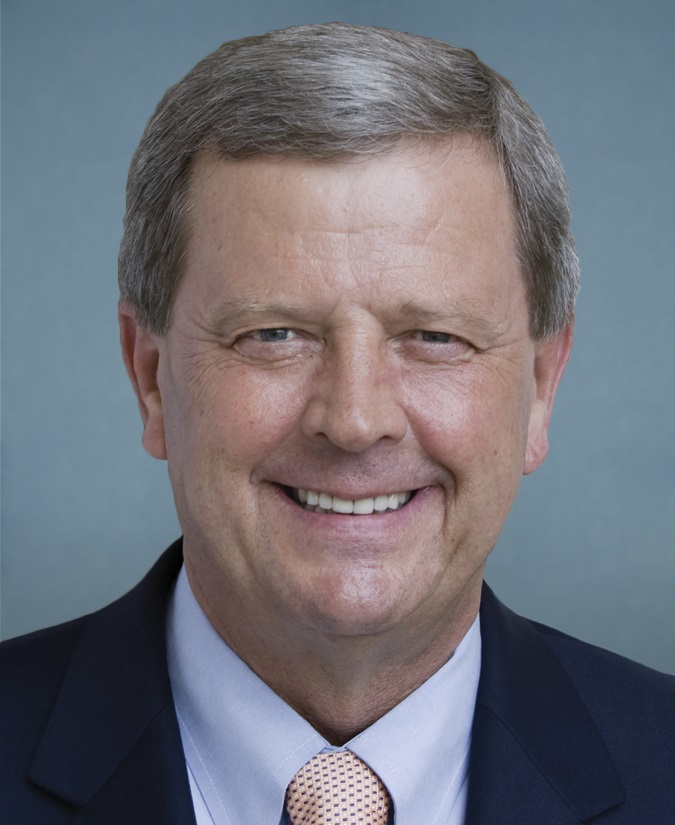

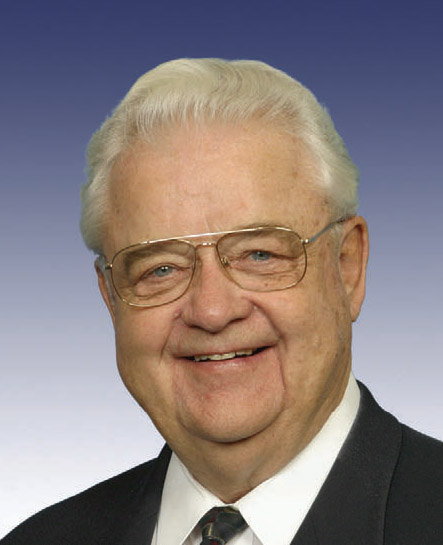
Nominee	Tom Latham	Leonard Boswell
Party	Republican	Democratic
Popular vote	202,000	168,632
Percentage	52.8%	43.6%
- County results Latham: 50–60% 60–70% Boswell: 40–50%
U.S. Representative before election
Tom Latham
Republican
Elected U.S. Representative
Tom Latham
Republican

Leonard Boswell, a Democrat who represented the 3rd district in central Iowa since 1997, and Tom Latham, a Republican who represented the 4th district in northern and central Iowa since 1995, both ran in the new 3rd district. Latham, who lived in the new 4th district, moved south to avoid facing fellow Republican Steve King in a primary.

=== Democratic primary ===
==== Candidates ====
===== Nominee =====
- Leonard Boswell, incumbent U.S. Representative

==== Primary results ====
Democratic primary results
Party	Candidate	Votes	%
Democratic	Leonard Boswell (incumbent)	8,382	98.3
Democratic	Write-ins	145	1.7
Total votes		8,527	100.0

=== Republican primary ===
==== Candidates ====
===== Nominee =====
- Tom Latham, incumbent U.S. Representative

==== Primary results ====
Republican primary results
Party	Candidate	Votes	%
Republican	Tom Latham (incumbent)	27,757	99.2
Republican	Write-ins	218	0.8
Total votes		27,975	100.0

=== General election ===
==== Campaign ====
Approximately half of the new 3rd district was at the time represented by Boswell, whereas the new 3rd district contained than 20 per cent of the area currently represented by Latham. However, Latham had $983,500 cash on hand at the end of March 2011, whereas Boswell had just $173,815.

==== Endorsements ====
Leonard Boswell (D)

Organizations

- Democratic Congressional Campaign Committee "Frontline" Program
Tom Latham (R)

Organizations

- National Republican Congressional Committee "Patriot" Program

==== Debate ====
The first debate was held October 10, 2012 at 7 pm, sponsored by KCCI and the Des Moines Register.

2012 Iowa's 3rd congressional district debate
No.	Date	Host	Moderator	Link	Democratic	Republican
Key: P Participant A Absent N Not invited I Invited W Withdrawn						
Key: P Participant A Absent N Not invited I Invited W Withdrawn					Leonard Boswell	Tom Latham
1	Oct. 10, 2012	The Des Moines Register; KCCI	Kevin Cooney; Kathy Obradovich	C-SPAN	P	P

==== Polling ====
Poll source	Date(s) administered	Sample size	Margin of error	Leonard Boswell (D)	Tom Latham (R)	Scott Batcher (I)	Undecided
Benenson (D-DCCC)	September 18–20, 2012	400 (LV)	± 3.9%	45%	45%	7%	3%

==== Predictions ====
Source	Ranking	As of
The Cook Political Report	Lean R (flip)	November 5, 2012
Rothenberg	Tilt R (flip)	November 2, 2012
Roll Call	Tossup	November 4, 2012
Sabato's Crystal Ball	Lean R (flip)	November 5, 2012
NY Times	Tossup	November 4, 2012
RCP	Tossup	November 4, 2012
The Hill	Tossup	November 4, 2012

==== Results ====
Iowa's 3rd congressional district, 2012
Party	Candidate	Votes	%
Republican	Tom Latham (incumbent)	202,000	52.2
Democratic	Leonard Boswell (incumbent)	168,632	43.6
Independent	Scott G. Batcher	9,352	2.4
Socialist Workers	David Rosenfeld	6,286	1.6
n/a	Write-ins	572	0.2
Total votes		386,842	100.0
Republican gain from Democratic			

== District 4 ==
2012 Iowa's 4th congressional district election
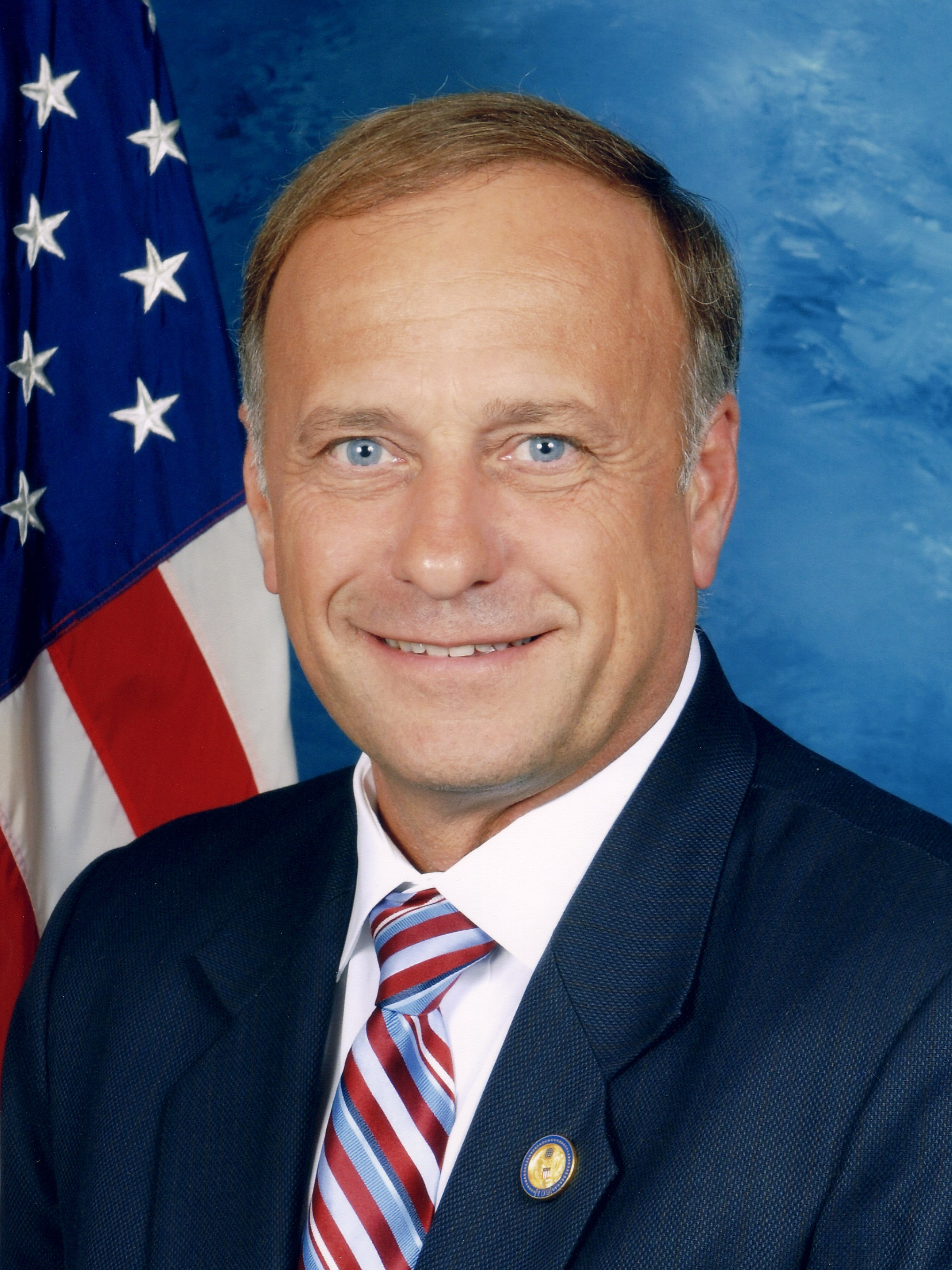

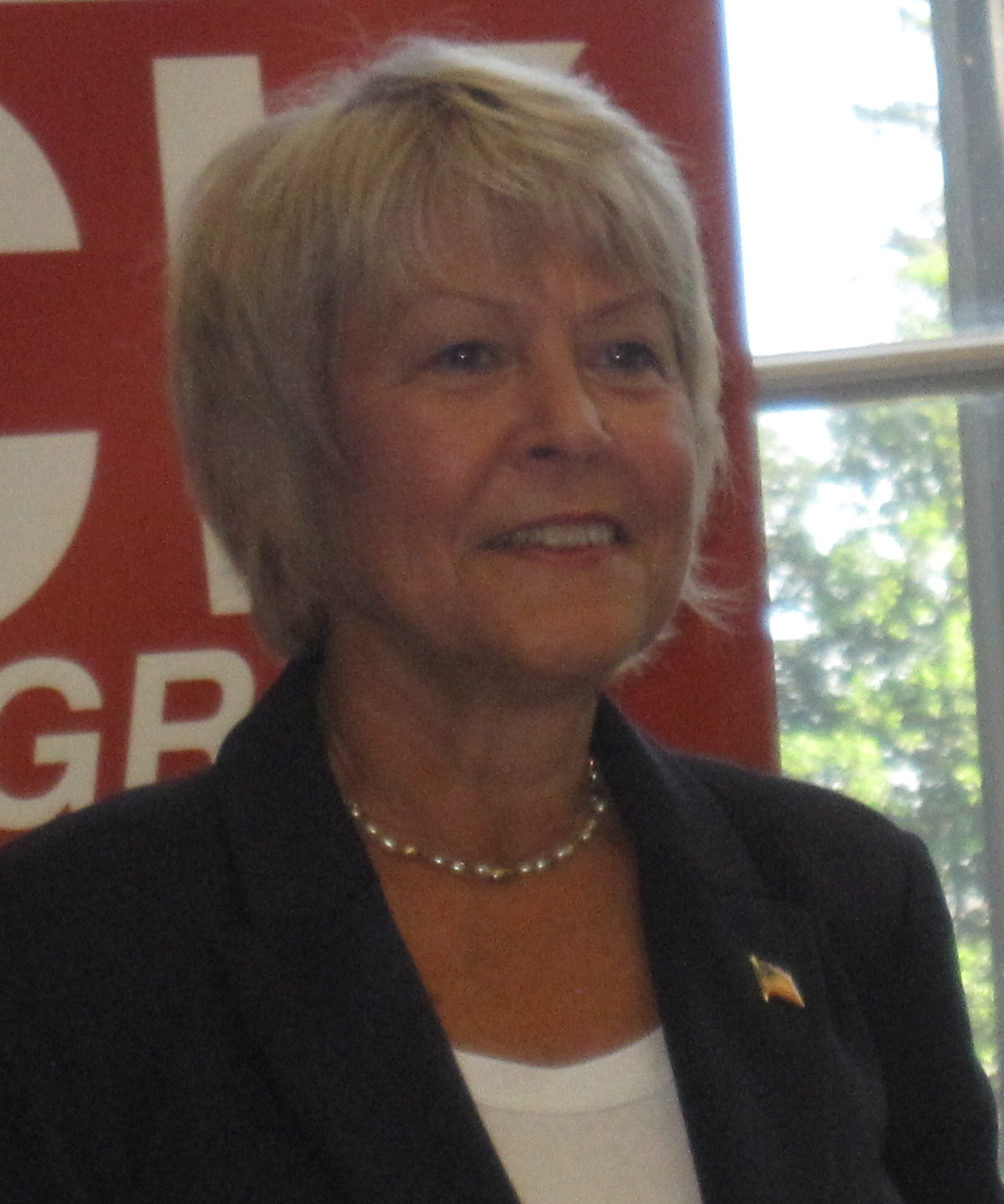
Nominee	Steve King	Christie Vilsack
Party	Republican	Democratic
Popular vote	200,063	169,470
Percentage	52.9%	44.9%
- County results King: 40–50% 50–60% 60–70% 70–80% 80–90% Vilsack: 50–60%
U.S. Representative before election
Steve King
Republican
Elected U.S. Representative
Steve King
Republican

Steve King, a Republican represented western Iowa's 5th district since 2003, ran in the new 4th district. The new 4th district comprises mostly territory which King represented and which tends to vote for Republican candidates.

=== Republican primary ===
==== Candidates ====
===== Nominee =====
- Steve King, incumbent U.S. Representative

===== Declined =====
- Tom Latham, incumbent U.S. Representative for the 4th district

==== Primary results ====
Republican primary results
Party	Candidate	Votes	%
Republican	Steve King (incumbent)	38,238	98.9
Republican	Write-ins	420	1.1
Total votes		38,658	100.0

=== Democratic primary ===
==== Candidates ====
===== Nominee =====
- Christie Vilsack, former First Lady of Iowa

==== Primary results ====
Democratic primary results
Party	Candidate	Votes	%
Democratic	Christie Vilsack	10,765	99.2
Democratic	Write-ins	88	0.8
Total votes		10,853	100.0

=== Independents ===
Martin James Monroe also ran.

=== General election ===
==== Endorsements ====
Christie Vilsack (D)

Organizations

- Democratic Congressional Campaign Committee "Red to Blue" Program
- EMILY's List

==== Debates ====
- Complete video of debate, September 27, 2012
- Complete video of debate, October 25, 2012

==== Polling ====
Poll source	Date(s) administered	Sample size	Margin of error	Steve King (R)	Christie Vilsack (D)	Martin Monroe (I)	Undecided
Public Policy Polling (D-CREDO)	September 24–25, 2012	577 (LV)	± %	48%	45%	—	7%
Greenberg Quinlan Rosner Research (D-Vilsack)	September 22–25, 2012	400 (LV)	± 4.9%	46%	44%	4%	6%
American Viewpoint (R-American Future Fund)	September 23–24, 2012	400 (LV)	± 4.9%	48%	41%	—	11%
Public Policy Polling (D-House Majority PAC)	January 18–23, 2012	974 (RV)	± 3.1%	49%	43%	—	8%

==== Predictions ====
Source	Ranking	As of
The Cook Political Report	Lean R	November 5, 2012
Rothenberg	Tilts R	November 2, 2012
Roll Call	Lean R	November 4, 2012
Sabato's Crystal Ball	Lean R	November 5, 2012
NY Times	Lean R	November 4, 2012
RCP	Tossup	November 4, 2012
The Hill	Lean R	November 4, 2012

==== Results ====
Iowa's 4th congressional district, 2012
Party	Candidate	Votes	%
Republican	Steve King (incumbent)	200,063	52.9
Democratic	Christie Vilsack	169,470	44.9
Independent	Martin James Monroe	8,124	2.1
n/a	Write-ins	226	0.1
Total votes		377,883	100.0
Republican hold			
