= Southeast Iowa Union =

Newspaper in Iowa, United States

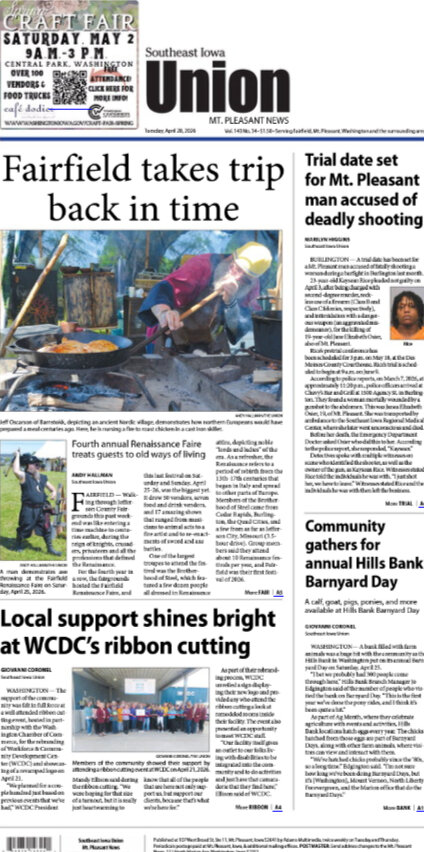
- The April 28, 2026, front page of Southeast Iowa Union
- Type: Weekly newspaper
- Format: Broadsheet
- Owner: Adams MultiMedia
- Founded: 2019
- Language: English
- Headquarters: 111 N Marion Ave, Washington, IA, 52353, U.S.
- Country: United States
- Circulation: 874
- Website: southeastiowaunion.com

The Southeast Iowa Union is a twice-weekly newspaper published on Tuesdays and Thursdays and based in Washington, Mount Pleasant, and Fairfield, Iowa. Its online edition is updated daily.

== History ==
The Southeast Iowa Union was established in 2019 through the merger of three newspapers: the Washington Evening Journal, The Fairfield Ledger, and Mt. Pleasant News.

In July 2022, The Gazette, along with the Southeast Iowa Union, expanded its regional footprint by acquiring four weekly newspapers—the Star Press-Union, Marengo Pioneer Republican, Williamsburg Journal Tribune, and Poweshiek County Chronicle Republican—from USA Today Co., the parent company of The Des Moines Register.

In November 2025, the Southeast Iowa Union and eleven other community newspapers were sold to Adams MultiMedia.
