= Marti Anderson (politician) =

American politician

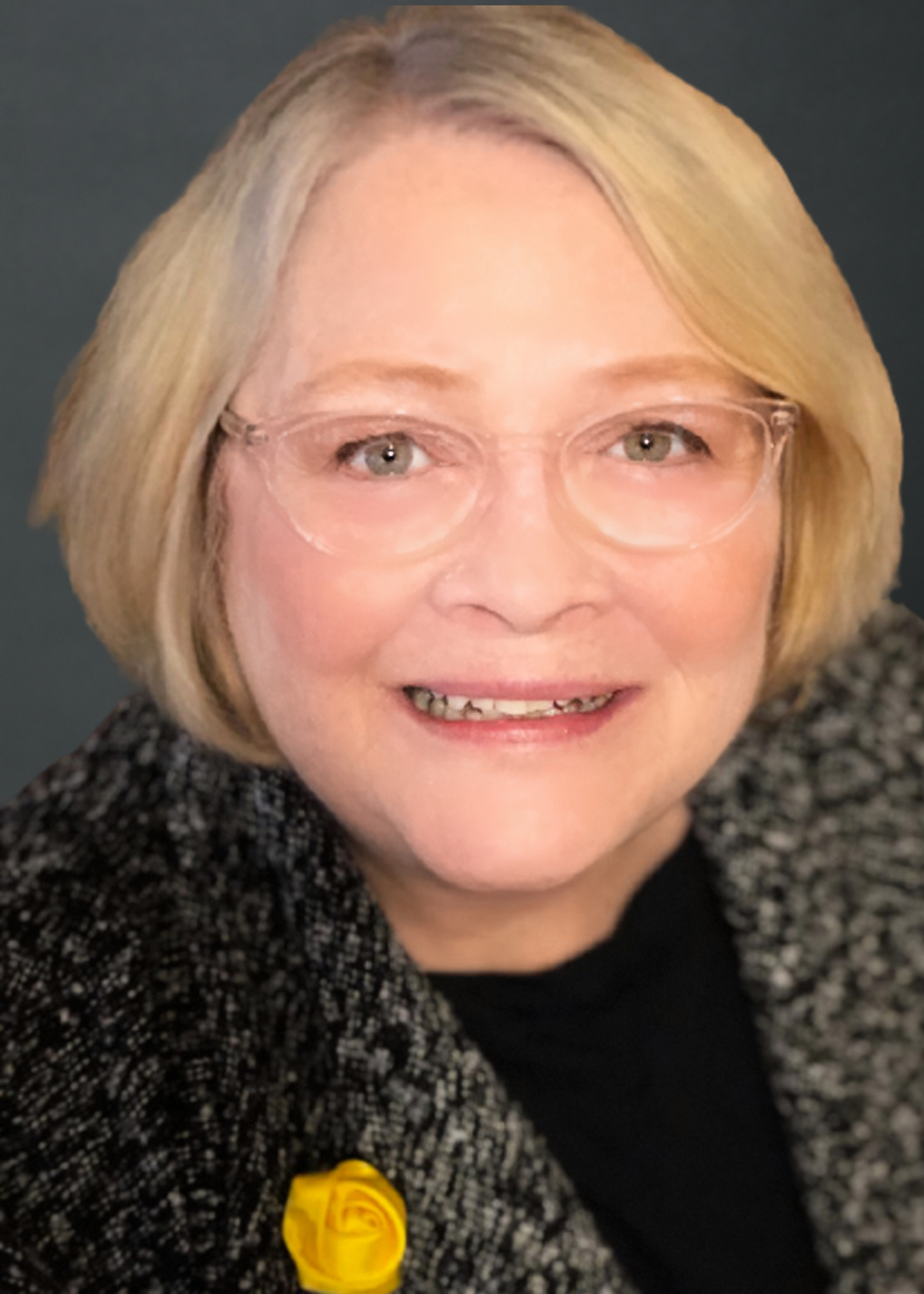
- Anderson

Member of the Iowa House of Representatives from the Iowa 36 district
- In office January 14, 2013 – January 9, 2023
- Preceded by: Janet Petersen
- Succeeded by: Sean Bagniewski

Personal details
- Born: April 21, 1951 (age 75) Des Moines, Iowa, U.S.
- Party: Democratic
- Spouse: Robert (Bram) Brammer
- Children: 1 daughter, 1 stepson, 1 stepdaughter
- Education: University of Northern Iowa; University of Iowa
- Occupation: crime victim advocate, State Representative
- Profession: Social Worker
- Website: legis.iowa.gov/...

Marti Anderson (born 1951) is an American politician. A Democrat, she served as the representative from the 36th District in the Iowa House of Representatives from 2013 to 2023.

== Early life ==
Anderson was born in 1951 in Des Moines, Iowa. She attended St. Joseph Academy and she earned a B.A. degree in social work from the University of Northern Iowa and an M.S.W. from the University of Iowa.

== Political career ==
During her first term, Anderson served on several committees in the Iowa House – the Environmental Protection, Human Resources, Judiciary, and Public Safety committees. She also served as a member of the Justice System Appropriations Subcommittee. Subsequently, she also served International Affairs and State Government

== Electoral history ==
*incumbent

Election	Political result	Candidate	Party	Votes	%
Iowa House of Representatives primary elections, 2012; District 36; Turnout: 2,459	Democratic	Marti Anderson	Democratic	1,237	50.31%
Iowa House of Representatives primary elections, 2012; District 36; Turnout: 2,459	Democratic	Cara Kennedy-Ode	Democratic	1,133	46.08%
Iowa House of Representatives primary elections, 2012; District 36; Turnout: 2,459	Democratic	William Rock	Democratic	83	3.38%
Iowa House of Representatives general elections, 2012; District 36; Turnout: 18,079	Democratic (newly redistricted)	Marti Anderson	Democratic	11,360	62.84%
Iowa House of Representatives general elections, 2012; District 36; Turnout: 18,079	Democratic (newly redistricted)	Jeff Ibbotson	Republican	5,368	29.69%

Iowa House of Representatives
Preceded by Janet Petersen	36th District; 2013–2023	Succeeded by Sean Bagniewski
