= Tom Latham (politician) =

American politician (born 1948)

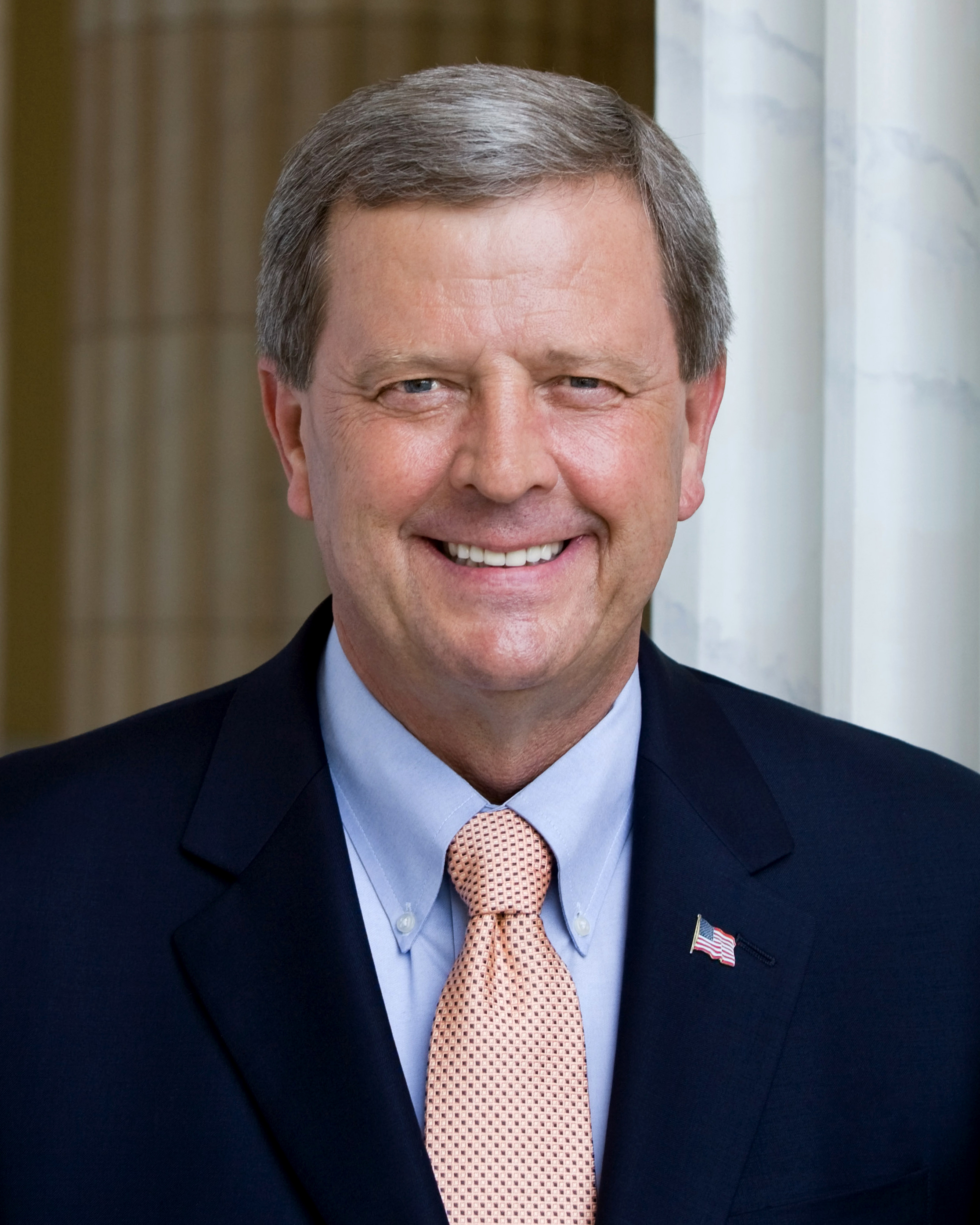
- Official portrait, 2011

Member of the U.S. House of Representatives from Iowa
- In office January 3, 1995 – January 3, 2015
- Preceded by: Fred Grandy
- Succeeded by: David Young
- Constituency: 5th district (1995–2003); 4th district (2003–2013); 3rd district (2013–2015)

Personal details
- Born: Thomas Paul Latham; July 14, 1948 (age 78) Hampton, Iowa, U.S.
- Party: Republican
- Spouse: Kathy Latham
- Relatives: Shannon Latham (niece-in-law)
- Education: Wartburg College; Iowa State University

Thomas Paul Latham (born July 14, 1948) is an American politician who served as a U.S. representative for Iowa from 1995 to 2015. He is a member of the Republican Party. On December 17, 2013, Latham announced he would not seek reelection next term, becoming the third member of the U.S. House to announce his retirement on the same day (along with Frank Wolf from Virginia and Jim Matheson from Utah).

== Early life and education ==
Latham was born in Hampton, Iowa to Evelyn R. (née Johansen) and Willard Chester Latham. His father was of English and Danish descent and his mother was of Danish ancestry. He was raised on a farm in nearby Alexander. He attended Wartburg College and Iowa State University, but did not graduate.

== Early career ==
Before entering the House, he was part-owner of Latham Seeds, a family-owned seed company founded by his father. Latham sold his interest before running for Congress.

== U.S. House of Representatives ==
Latham was sworn in on January 3, 1995.

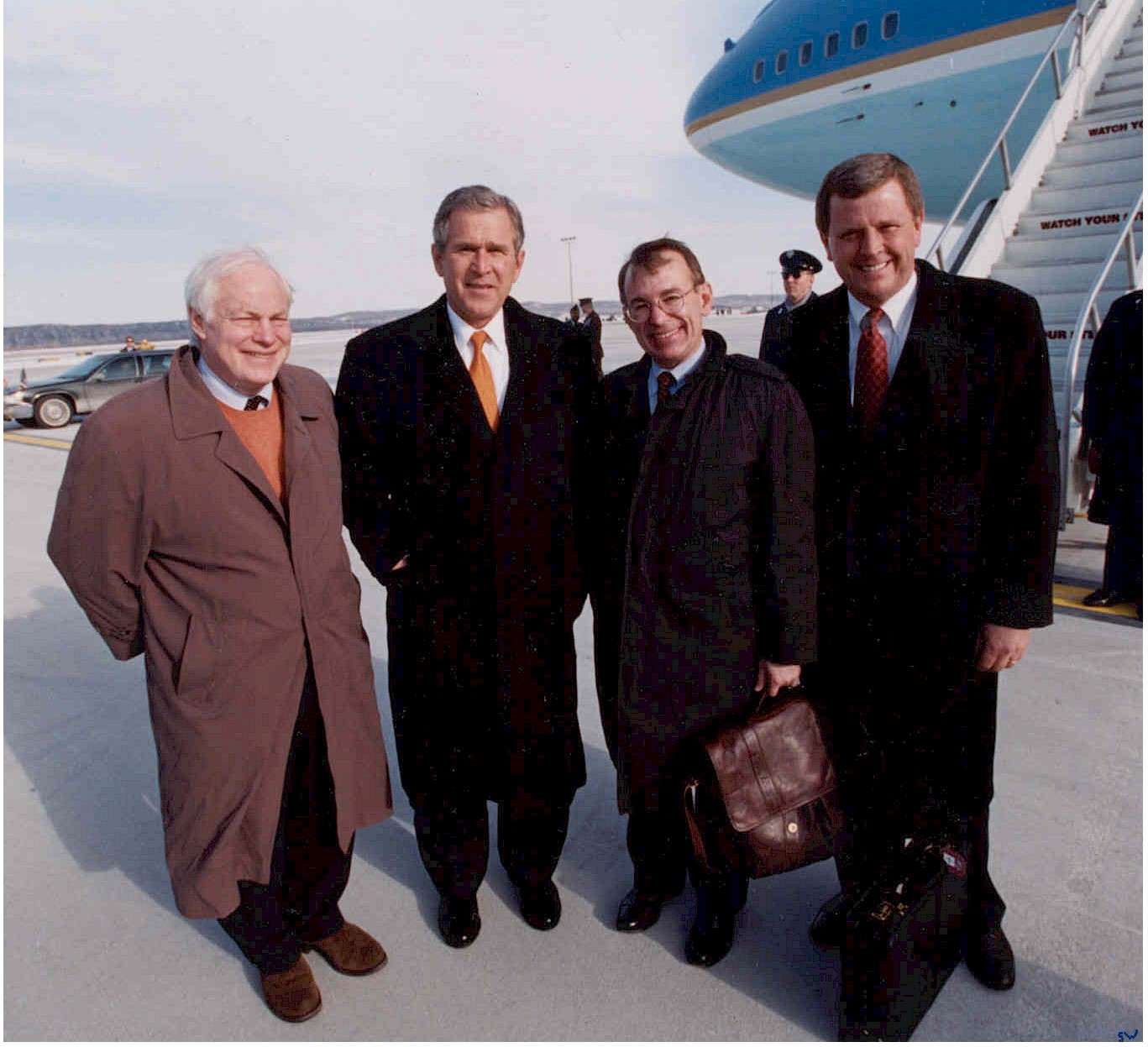
Latham with President George W. Bush, Greg Ganske, and Jim Leach in February 2001

=== Committee assignments ===
- Committee on Appropriations
  - Subcommittee on Agriculture, Rural Development, Food and Drug Administration, and Related Agencies
  - Subcommittee on Homeland Security
  - Subcommittee on Transportation, Housing and Urban Development, and Related Agencies (Chair)

=== Leadership roles and caucus memberships ===
- Co-chair, Congressional Hearing Health Caucus
- Congressional COPD Caucus
- Dean of Iowa's delegation in the U.S. House of Representatives
- Task Force for a Drug-Free America
- Prescription Drug Action Leadership Team
- Congressional Task Force for Affordable Natural Gas
- National Service Caucus

== Political campaigns ==
Latham was elected as the congressman for Iowa's 5th congressional district in 1994 as part of the wave that allowed Republicans to take over the House for the first time since 1955. The 5th was far and away the most Republican district in the state, and Latham never faced a serious challenge as the 5th District's congressman. In 1994 he defeated Democrat Sheila McGuire garnering 61 percent of the vote. In 1996 he won 65 percent of the vote in defeating Democrat MacDonald Smith, and he ran unopposed in the 1998 election.

For his first four terms, Latham represented a district that stretched from Sioux City in the northwest all the way to Mason City on the other side of the state. The 2000 round of redistricting, however, significantly altered Iowa's congressional map. Latham's home in Alexander, along with most of the eastern third of his old district, was placed in the new 4th District in the north-central part of the state. This district was considered much more competitive than Latham's old district. For the 2008 elections, it had a Cook Partisan Voting Index of D+0.4, making it one of the most marginal districts in the nation. However, he was reelected four times from this district without much difficulty. This may be because he is the only Iowan on the powerful House Appropriations Committee.

In the 2006 election, neither the Republican nor Democratic parties had a contested primary. His opponent in the 2006 general election was Selden Spencer, a neurologist from Huxley. Latham, who had moved to Ames, closer to the center of the district, earned 57.3% of the vote as he won reelection. In the 2008 election Latham won against Democratic nominee Becky Greenwald with 61 percent of the vote even as Barack Obama carried the district by eight points. In 2010, Latham won against Democratic nominee Bill Maske, a school administrator.

Iowa lost a district as a result of the 2010 census. The western third of Latham's district—including his home in Ames and his former home in Alexander—was merged with the 5th District. This placed Latham in the same district as his successor in the 5th, fellow Republican Steve King.

The reconfigured district retained Latham's district number, the 4th. It was also geographically more Latham's district than King's; he retained 55 percent of his former territory. Indeed, it closely resembled the territory that Latham had represented from 1995 to 2003. Nevertheless, he opted to run in the reconfigured 3rd District, which stretches from Des Moines to Council Bluffs. He sold his home in Ames and bought a home in Clive, a suburb of Des Moines. He defeated Democratic incumbent Leonard Boswell in the 2012 election.

On February 27, 2013, Latham announced that he would not seek the open Senate seat of Tom Harkin in 2014. Latham requested to have his salary withheld during the United States federal government shutdown of 2013.

U.S. House of Representatives
Preceded by Fred Grandy	Member of the U.S. House of Representatives from Iowa's 5th congressional district 1995–2003	Succeeded by Steve King
Preceded by Greg Ganske	Member of the U.S. House of Representatives from Iowa's 4th congressional district 2003–2013	Succeeded by Steve King
Preceded by Leonard Boswell	Member of the U.S. House of Representatives from Iowa's 3rd congressional district 2013–2015	Succeeded by David Young
U.S. order of precedence (ceremonial)
Preceded by Ruben Hinojosa as Former U.S. Representative	Order of precedence of the United States as Former U.S. Representative	Succeeded by Lynn Woolsey as Former U.S. Representative
