= 2024 United States House of Representatives elections in Iowa =

- November 5, 2024

All 4 Iowa seats to the United States House of Representatives
	Majority party	Minority party
Party	Republican	Democratic
Last election	4	0
Seats won	4	0
Seat change	Steady	Steady
Popular vote	904,563	696,033
Percentage	56.20%	43.24%
Swing	▲0.26%	▼0.21%

Republican
40–50%
50–60%
60–70%
70–80%
80–90%
Democratic
50–60%
70–80%

The 2024 United States House of Representatives elections in Iowa were held on November 5, 2024, to elect the four U.S. representatives from the State of Iowa, one from all four of the state's congressional districts. The elections coincided with the 2024 U.S. presidential election, other elections to the House of Representatives, elections to the United States Senate, and various state and local elections. The primary elections took place on June 4, 2024.

== Overview ==
=== Statewide ===
Party	Candi- dates	Votes		Seats		
Party	Candi- dates	No.	%	No.	+/–	%
Republican Party	4	904,564	56.20%	4	Steady	100%
Democratic Party	4	696,037	43.24%	0	Steady	0%
Independent	1	5,381	0.33%	0	Steady	0%
Write-ins	–	3,632	0.23%	0	Steady	0%
Total	9	1,609,609	100%	4	Steady	100%

Popular vote
Republican	56.20%
Democratic	43.24%
Other	0.56%

House seats
Republican	100.0%

=== District ===
District	Republican		Democratic		Others		Total		Result
District	Votes	%	Votes	%	Votes	%	Votes	%	Result
District 1	206,955	49.98%	206,157	49.79%	967	0.23%	414,078	100.0%	Republican hold
District 2	233,340	57.08%	169,740	41.52%	5,722	1.40%	408,802	100.0%	Republican hold
District 3	213,747	51.77%	197,965	47.94%	1,197	0.29%	412,905	100.0%	Republican hold
District 4	250,522	67.02%	122,175	32.68%	1,127	0.30%	373,824	100.0%	Republican hold
Total	904,564	56.20%	696,037	43.24%	9,013	0.56%	1,609,609	100.0%	

== District 1 ==
2024 Iowa's 1st congressional district election
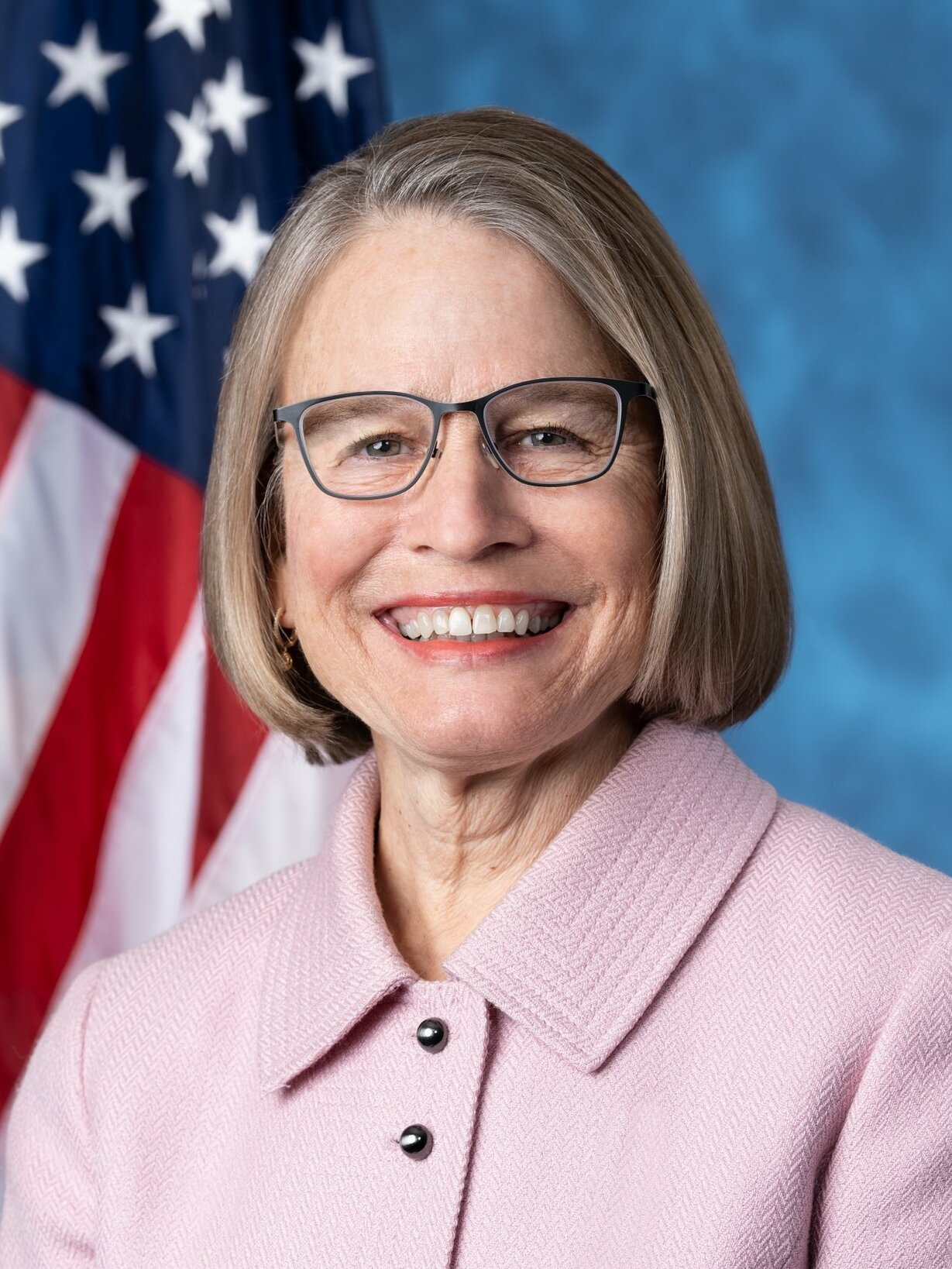

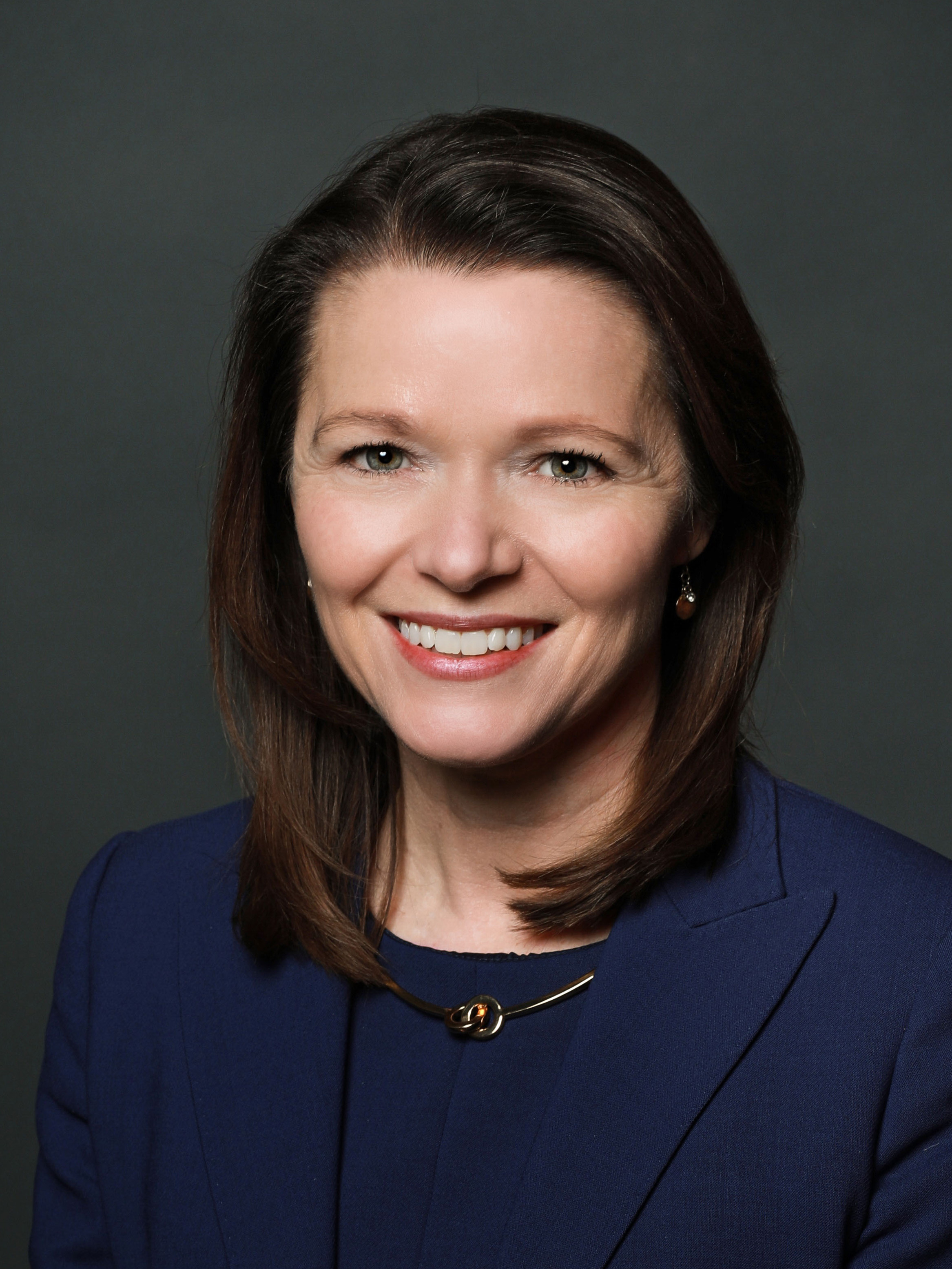
Nominee	Mariannette Miller-Meeks	Christina Bohannan
Party	Republican	Democratic
Popular vote	206,955	206,156
Percentage	50.0%	49.8%
- Miller-Meeks: 40–50% 50–60% 60–70% 70–80% 80–90% Bohannan: 40–50% 50–60% 60–70% 70–80% 80–90%
U.S. Representative before election
Mariannette Miller-Meeks
Republican
Elected U.S. Representative
Mariannette Miller-Meeks
Republican

This district is based in the southeastern part of the state and includes the cities of Davenport and Iowa City. The incumbent was Republican Mariannette Miller-Meeks, who was re-elected with 53.4% of the vote in 2022.

A recount certified Miller-Meeks as the winner on November 27.

=== Republican primary ===
==== Nominee ====
- Mariannette Miller-Meeks, incumbent U.S. representative

==== Eliminated in primary ====
- David Pautsch, ministry founder

==== Endorsements ====
Mariannette Miller-Meeks

Organizations

- AIPAC
- Americans for Prosperity (post-primary)
- ClearPath Action Fund
- Maggie's List
- National Rifle Association Political Victory Fund
- National Right to Life Committee
- With Honor Fund
David Pautsch

Statewide officials

- Mike Huckabee, former governor of Arkansas (1996–2007)

Individuals

- Mike Lindell, CEO of My Pillow

==== Fundraising ====
Campaign finance reports as of May 15, 2024
Candidate	Raised	Spent	Cash on hand
Marriannette Miller-Meeks (R)	$2,928,670	$1,391,202	$1,865,807
David Pautsch (R)	$35,353	$30,171	$6,181
Source: Federal Election Commission

==== Results ====
2024 GOP primary results by county: Miller-Meeks: 50–60%; 60–70%; Pautsch: 50–60%

Republican primary results
Party	Candidate	Votes	%
Republican	Mariannette Miller-Meeks (incumbent)	16,529	56.0
Republican	David Pautsch	12,981	44.0
Total votes		29,510	100.0

=== Democratic primary ===
==== Nominee ====
- Christina Bohannan, former state representative and nominee for this district in 2022

==== Endorsements ====
Christina Bohannan

U.S. representatives

- Lois Frankel, FL-22 (2013–2017, 2023–present)
- Annie Kuster, NH-02 (2013–present)
- Pat Ryan, NY-18 (2022–present)

Statewide officials

- Gretchen Whitmer, governor of Michigan (2019–present) (post-primary)

Organizations

- 314 Action
- DCCC Red to Blue
- Democratic Majority for Israel
- EMILY's List
- Everytown for Gun Safety
- Harvard College Democrats
- J Street PAC
- Jewish Democratic Council of America
- League of Conservation Voters
- National Organization for Women PAC
- NewDem Action Fund
- Planned Parenthood Action Fund
- Reproductive Freedom for All

Labor unions

- Iowa AFL-CIO (post-primary)
- United Auto Workers (post-primary)

==== Fundraising ====
Campaign finance reports as of May 15, 2024
Candidate	Raised	Spent	Cash on hand
Christina Bohannan (D)	$2,579,582	$780,700	$1,828,606
Source: Federal Election Commission

==== Results ====
Democratic primary results
Party	Candidate	Votes	%
Democratic	Christina Bohannan	13,870	100.0
Total votes		13,870	100.0

=== Libertarian Party ===
==== Disqualified ====
- Nicholas Gluba, Lone Tree city councilor (ran a write-in campaign)

=== General election ===
==== Predictions ====
Source	Ranking	As of
The Cook Political Report	Tossup	November 1, 2024
Inside Elections	Tilt D (flip)	October 31, 2024
Sabato's Crystal Ball	Lean D (flip)	November 4, 2024
Elections Daily	Lean R	November 4, 2024
CNalysis	Tilt D (flip)	November 4, 2024
Decision Desk HQ	Likely R	June 1, 2024

==== Polling ====
Poll source	Date(s) administered	Sample size (Note: Key: A – all adults RV – registered voters LV – likely voters V – unclear)	Margin of error	Marianette Miller-Meeks (R)	Christina Bohannan (D)	Other	Undecided
DCCC (D)	September 30 – October 1, 2024	625 (LV)	± 3.9%	46%	50%	–	4%
Normington, Petts & Associates (D) (Note: Poll sponsored by Bohannan's campaign)	August 27–29, 2024	400 (LV)	± 4.9%	47%	47%	–	6%
RMG Research (Note: Poll sponsored by U.S. Term Limits, whose term limits pledge Bohannan has signed)	November 28 – December 2, 2023	448 (LV)	± 4.6%	38%	35%	11% (Note: "Someone else" with 10%; "Would not vote" with 1%)	15%

Hypothetical polling

Generic Republican vs. generic Democrat

Poll source	Date(s) administered	Sample size	Margin of error	Generic Republican	Generic Democrat	Other	Undecided
Selzer & Co. (Note: Poll conducted for the Des Moines Register & Mediacom)	October 28–31, 2024	242 (LV)	± 6.2%	37%	53%	7% (Note: "Other" with 3%, "Wouldn't vote" & "Don't want to tell" with 2%)	3%
Selzer & Co.	September 8–11, 2024	189 (LV)	± 7.1%	46%	49%	–	5%
Selzer & Co.	June 9–14, 2024	179 (LV)	± 7.3%	53%	41%	–	6%
Selzer & Co.	February 25–28, 2024	168 (LV)	± 7.6%	45%	49%	1%	5%

==== Results ====
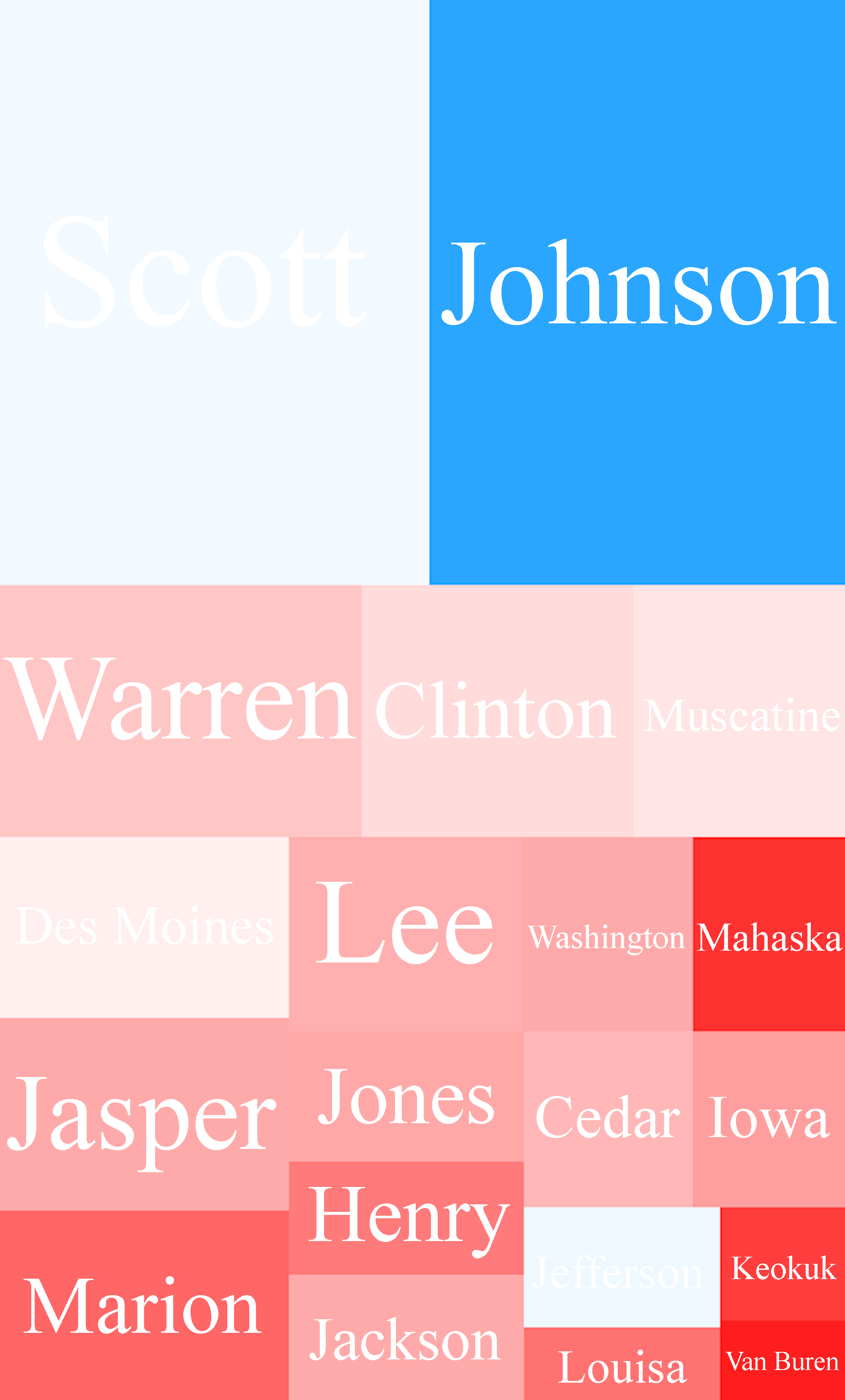
Cartogram of Iowa's First Congressional District

2024 Iowa's 1st congressional district election
Party	Candidate	Votes	%
Republican	Mariannette Miller-Meeks (incumbent)	206,955	49.98
Democratic	Christina Bohannan	206,156	49.79
Write-in		967	0.23
Total votes		414,078	100.0
Republican hold			

==== By county ====
County	Mariannette Miller-Meeks Republican		Christina Bohannan Democratic		Write-ins		Margin		Total
County	#	%	#	%	#	%	#	%	Total
Cedar	5,943	57.07%	4,460	42.83%	10	0.10%	1,483	14.24%	10,413
Clinton	12,460	53.49%	10,787	46.31%	48	0.21%	1,673	7.18%	23,295
Des Moines	9,433	51.38%	8,874	48.33%	54	0.29%	559	3.05%	18,361
Henry	5,800	62.87%	3,397	36.82%	28	0.30%	2,403	26.05%	9,225
Iowa	5,550	59.29%	3,783	40.41%	28	0.30%	1,767	18.88%	9,361
Jackson	6,021	58.03%	4,332	41.75%	22	0.21%	1,689	16.28%	10,375
Jasper	11,358	58.12%	8,147	41.69%	39	0.20%	3,211	16.43%	19,544
Jefferson	3,955	48.37%	4,197	51.33%	25	0.31%	-242	-2.96%	8,177
Johnson	24,771	29.18%	59,993	70.66%	137	0.16%	-35,222	-41.48%	84,901
Jones	6,266	58.32%	4,459	41.50%	19	0.18%	1,807	16.82%	10,744
Keokuk	3,419	68.95%	1,533	30.91%	7	0.14%	1,886	38.04%	4,959
Lee	9,098	57.54%	6,687	42.29%	26	0.16%	2,411	15.25%	15,811
Louisa	3,183	63.70%	1,798	35.98%	16	0.32%	1,385	27.72%	4,997
Mahaska	7,403	69.68%	3,173	29.86%	49	0.46%	4,230	39.82%	10,625
Marion	12,377	64.82%	6,663	34.90%	53	0.28%	5,714	29.92%	19,093
Muscatine	10,138	52.51%	9,128	47.28%	42	0.22%	1,010	5.23%	19,308
Scott	42,896	48.73%	44,902	51.01%	233	0.26%	-2,006	-2.28%	88,031
Van Buren	2,562	71.89%	994	27.89%	8	0.22%	1,568	44.00%	3,564
Warren	17,706	55.45%	14,143	44.29%	85	0.27%	3,563	11.16%	31,934
Washington	6,616	58.24%	4,706	41.43%	38	0.33%	1,910	16.81%	11,360
Total	206,955	49.98%	206,157	49.79%	967	0.23%	798	0.19%	414,079

== District 2 ==
2024 Iowa's 2nd congressional district election
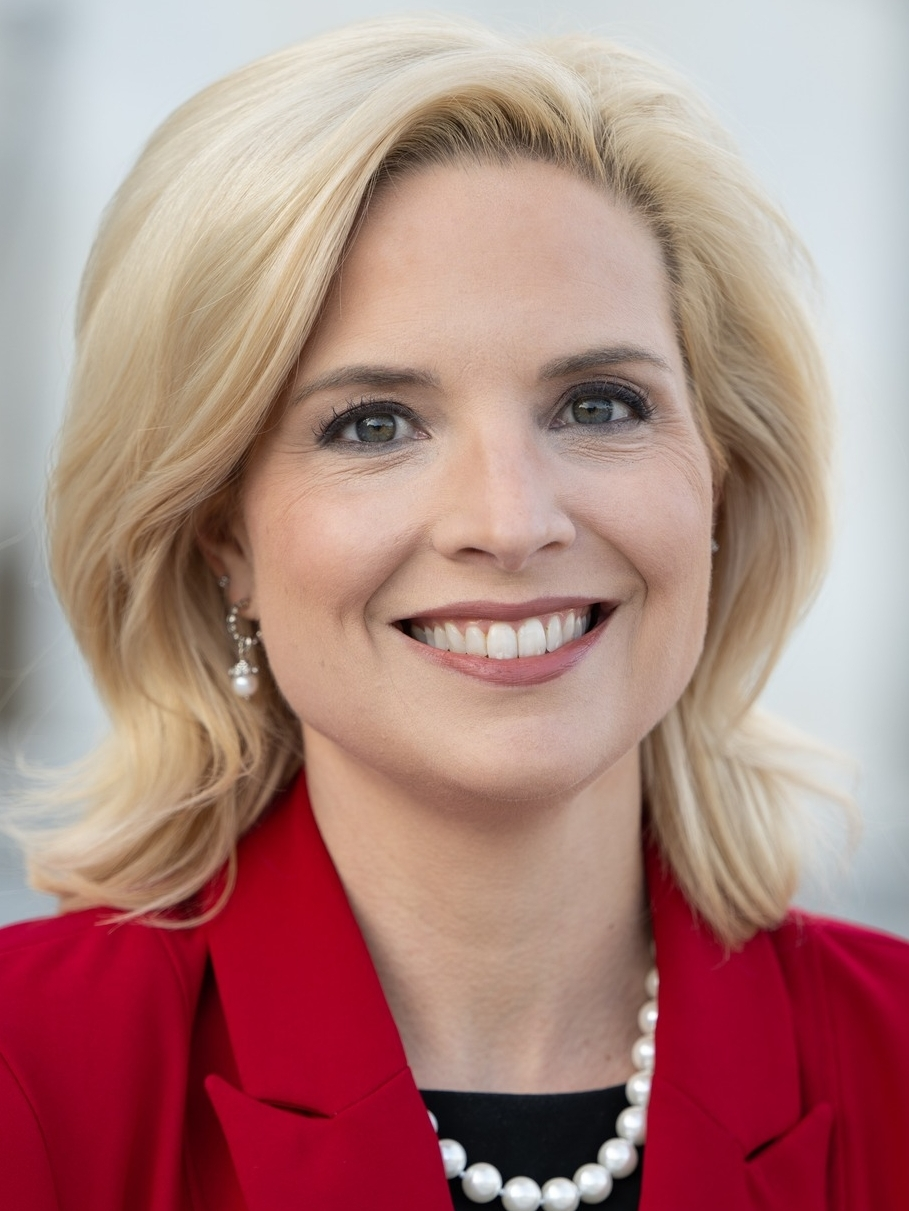

Nominee	Ashley Hinson	Sarah Corkery
Party	Republican	Democratic
Popular vote	233,340	169,740
Percentage	57.1%	41.5%
- County results Hinson: 50–60% 60–70% 70–80% Corkery: 50–60%
U.S. Representative before election
Ashley Hinson
Republican
Elected U.S. Representative
Ashley Hinson
Republican

The 2nd district is based in northeastern Iowa and contains the cities of Cedar Rapids, Waterloo, and Dubuque. The incumbent was Republican Ashley Hinson who was re-elected with 54.1% of the vote in 2022.

=== Republican primary ===
==== Nominee ====
- Ashley Hinson, incumbent U.S. representative

==== Endorsements ====
Ashley Hinson

Organizations

- AIPAC
- ClearPath Action Fund
- Log Cabin Republicans PAC
- Maggie's List
- United States Chamber of Commerce (post-primary)

==== Fundraising ====
Campaign finance reports as of May 15, 2024
Candidate	Raised	Spent	Cash on hand
Ashley Hinson (R)	$3,520,714	$2,010,578	$1,578,585
Source: Federal Election Commission

==== Results ====
Republican primary results
Party	Candidate	Votes	%
Republican	Ashley Hinson (incumbent)	22,626	100.0
Total votes		22,626	100.0

=== Democratic primary ===
==== Nominee ====
- Sarah Corkery, marketing executive

==== Endorsements ====
Sarah Corkery

Organizations

- Reproductive Freedom for All

Labor unions

- Iowa AFL-CIO (post-primary)

==== Fundraising ====
Campaign finance reports as of May 15, 2024
Candidate	Raised	Spent	Cash on hand
Sarah Corkery (D)	$205,086	$133,880	$71,206
Source: Federal Election Commission

==== Results ====
Democratic primary results
Party	Candidate	Votes	%
Democratic	Sarah Corkery	10,479	100.0
Total votes		10,479	100.0

=== Independents ===
==== Declared ====
- Jody Puffett, financial executive

=== General election ===
==== Predictions ====
Source	Ranking	As of
The Cook Political Report	Solid R	November 1, 2024
Inside Elections	Solid R	October 31, 2024
Sabato's Crystal Ball	Safe R	February 7, 2024
Elections Daily	Likely R	November 4, 2024
CNalysis	Likely R	November 4, 2024
Decision Desk HQ	Safe R	October 11, 2024

==== Polling ====
Hypothetical polling

Generic Republican vs. generic Democrat

Poll source	Date(s) administered	Sample size	Margin of error	Generic Republican	Generic Democrat	Other	Undecided
Selzer & Co.	October 28–31, 2024	187 (LV)	± 7.2%	45%	42%	9% (Note: "Other" with 5%, "Wouldn't vote" with 3%; "Don't want to tell" with 1%)	4%
Selzer & Co.	September 8–11, 2024	189 (LV)	± 7.1%	52%	44%	1%	3%
Selzer & Co.	June 9–14, 2024	148 (LV)	± 8.1%	57%	36%	4%	3%
Selzer & Co.	February 25–28, 2024	151 (LV)	± 8.0%	61%	33%	2%	4%

==== Results ====
2024 Iowa's 2nd congressional district election
Party	Candidate	Votes	%
Republican	Ashley Hinson (incumbent)	233,340	57.1
Democratic	Sarah Corkery	169,740	41.5
Independent	Jody Puffett	5,381	1.3
Write-in		341	0.1
Total votes		408,802	100.0
Republican hold			

===== By county =====
County	Ashley Hinson Republican		Sarah Corkery Democratic		Various candidates Other parties		Margin		Total
County	#	%	#	%	#	%	#	%	Total
Allamakee	4,863	68.32%	2,116	29.73%	139	1.95%	2,747	38.59%	7,118
Benton	9,714	68.54%	4,238	29.90%	221	1.56%	5,476	38.64%	14,173
Black Hawk	30,843	50.72%	29,296	48.18%	672	1.11%	1,547	2.54%	60,811
Bremer	9,016	63.32%	5,034	35.35%	189	1.33%	3,982	27.97%	14,239
Buchanan	6,720	63.86%	3,573	33.95%	230	2.19%	3,147	29.91%	10,523
Butler	5,823	74.25%	1,905	24.29%	114	1.45%	3,918	49.96%	7,842
Cerro Gordo	12,526	57.46%	8,926	40.94%	348	1.60%	3,600	16.52%	21,800
Chickasaw	4,217	70.48%	1,682	28.11%	84	1.41%	2,535	42.37%	5,983
Clayton	6,409	69.88%	2,647	28.86%	115	1.25%	3,762	41.02%	9,171
Delaware	7,044	70.38%	2,570	25.68%	394	3.94%	4,474	44.70%	10,008
Dubuque	29,233	57.31%	21,143	41.45%	636	1.25%	8,090	15.86%	51,012
Fayette	6,471	66.86%	3,070	31.72%	137	1.41%	3,401	35.14%	9,678
Floyd	4,815	65.25%	2,395	32.46%	169	2.29%	2,420	32.79%	7,379
Grundy	5,196	74.47%	1,722	24.68%	59	0.85%	3,474	49.79%	6,977
Hardin	5,685	71.18%	2,155	26.98%	147	1.85%	3,530	44.20%	7,987
Howard	3,218	68.66%	1,388	29.61%	81	1.73%	1,830	39.05%	4,687
Linn	56,744	47.27%	61,886	51.56%	1,403	1.17%	-5,142	-4.29%	120,033
Mitchell	3,930	70.05%	1,616	28.81%	64	1.14%	2,314	41.24%	5,610
Poweshiek	5,768	60.49%	3,606	37.82%	161	1.69%	2,162	22.67%	9,535
Tama	5,554	65.84%	2,796	33.15%	85	1.01%	2,758	32.69%	8,435
Winneshiek	6,750	57.80%	4,763	40.79%	165	1.41%	1,987	17.01%	11,678
Worth	2,801	67.94%	1,213	29.42%	109	2.64%	1,588	38.52%	4,123
Total	233,340	57.08%	169,740	41.52%	5,722	1.40%	63,600	15.56%	408,802

== District 3 ==
2024 Iowa's 3rd congressional district election
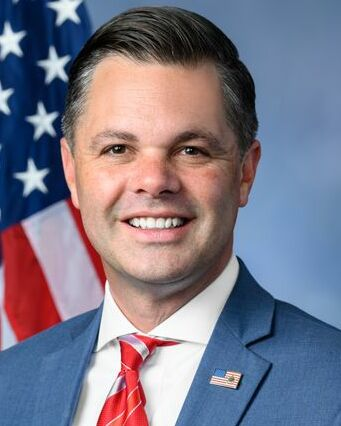

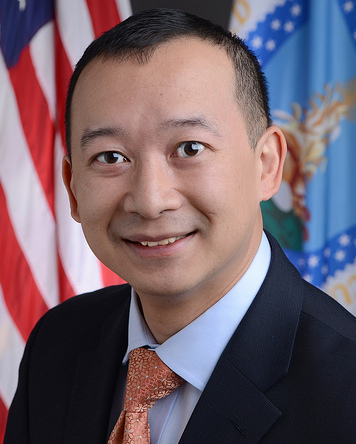
Nominee	Zach Nunn	Lanon Baccam
Party	Republican	Democratic
Popular vote	213,746	197,962
Percentage	51.8%	47.9%
- County results Nunn: 50–60% 60–70% 70–80% Baccam: 50–60%
U.S. Representative before election
Zach Nunn
Republican
Elected U.S. Representative
Zach Nunn
Republican

The 3rd district is based in southwestern Iowa and includes the city of Des Moines. The incumbent was Republican Zach Nunn, who flipped the district and was elected with 50.35% of the vote in 2022.

=== Republican primary ===
==== Nominee ====
- Zach Nunn, incumbent U.S. representative

==== Endorsements ====
Zach Nunn

Organizations

- AIPAC
- Americans for Prosperity
- With Honor Fund

==== Fundraising ====
Campaign finance reports as of May 15, 2024
Candidate	Raised	Spent	Cash on hand
Zach Nunn (R)	$3,217,656	$1,406,462	$1,912,261
Source: Federal Election Commission

==== Results ====
Republican primary results
Party	Candidate	Votes	%
Republican	Zach Nunn (incumbent)	21,103	100.0
Total votes		21,103	100.0

=== Democratic primary ===
==== Nominee ====
- Lanon Baccam, former deputy chief of staff to the U.S. secretary of agriculture

==== Eliminated in primary ====
- Melissa Vine, nonprofit executive

==== Declined ====
- Sarah Trone Garriott, state senator from the 14th district (2021–present)
- Jennifer Konfrst, minority leader of the Iowa House of Representatives (2021–present) from the 32nd district (2019–present)

==== Endorsements ====
Lanon Baccam

Executive branch officials

- Tom Vilsack, secretary of agriculture (2009–2017, 2021–present)

U.S representatives

- Annie Kuster, NH-02 (2013–2025)
- Grace Meng, NY-06 (2013–present)
- Seth Moulton, MA-06 (2015–present)
- Mike Thompson, CA-04 (1999–present)

Statewide officials

- Rob Sand, Iowa state auditor (2019–present)
- Gretchen Whitmer, governor of Michigan (2019–present) (post-primary)

Individuals

- Christie Vilsack, former first lady of Iowa (1999–2007)

Organizations

- Asian American Action Fund
- ASPIRE PAC
- Blue Dog PAC
- DCCC Red to Blue
- Democratic Majority for Israel
- Jewish Democratic Council of America
- League of Conservation Voters
- NewDem Action Fund
- VoteVets

Labor unions

- Iowa AFL-CIO (post-primary)
- United Auto Workers (post-primary)
Melissa Vine

Organizations

- Vote Mama

==== Fundraising ====
Campaign finance reports as of May 15, 2024
Candidate	Raised	Spent	Cash on hand
Lanon Baccam (D)	$1,950,912	$734,888	$1,216,023
Melissa Vine (D)	$154,821	$126,900	$27,921
Source: Federal Election Commission

==== Results ====
Democratic primary results
Party	Candidate	Votes	%
Democratic	Lanon Baccam	19,357	84.2
Democratic	Melissa Vine	3,642	15.8
Total votes		22,999	100.0

=== Libertarian Party ===
==== Disqualified ====
- Marco Battaglia, journalist, nominee for attorney general in 2018, and nominee for lieutenant governor in 2022 (ran a write-in campaign)

=== General election ===
==== Predictions ====
Source	Ranking	As of
The Cook Political Report	Tossup	November 1, 2024
Inside Elections	Tilt R	October 31, 2024
Sabato's Crystal Ball	Lean R	November 4, 2024
Elections Daily	Lean D (flip)	November 4, 2024
CNalysis	Tilt D (flip)	November 4, 2024
Decision Desk HQ	Tossup	October 27, 2024

==== Polling ====
Poll source	Date(s) administered	Sample size	Margin of error	Zach Nunn (R)	Lanon Baccam (D)	Other	Undecided
GQR (D) (Note: Poll sponsored by Baccam's campaign)	September 19–22, 2024	400 (LV)	± 4.9%	46%	50%	–	4%
RMG Research (Note: Poll sponsored by U.S. Term Limits, whose term limits pledge Nunn has signed)	September 5–12, 2024	483 (LV)	± 4.6%	39%	42%	5%	14%
GQR (D)	Early September 2024	–	–	46%	45%	–	9%
GQR (D)	July 1, 2024	550 (LV)	± 4.4%	43%	43%	6%	7%

Hypothetical polling

Generic Republican vs. generic Democrat

Poll source	Date(s) administered	Sample size	Margin of error	Generic Republican	Generic Democrat	Other	Undecided
Selzer & Co.	October 28–31, 2024	194 (LV)	± 7.1%	41%	48%	8% (Note: "Wouldn't vote" with 4%; "Other" and "Don't want to tell" with 2%)	3%
Selzer & Co.	September 8–11, 2024	150 (LV)	± 8.0%	52%	44%	–	4%
Selzer & Co.	June 9–14, 2024	149 (LV)	± 8.1%	55%	40%	–	5%
Selzer & Co.	February 25–28, 2024	155 (LV)	± 7.9%	47%	44%	3%	6%

==== Results ====
2024 Iowa's 3rd congressional district election
Party	Candidate	Votes	%
Republican	Zach Nunn (incumbent)	213,746	51.8
Democratic	Lanon Baccam	197,962	47.9
Write-in		1,197	0.3
Total votes		412,905	100.0
Republican hold			

===== By county =====
County	Zach Nunn Republican		Lanon Baccam Democratic		Write-ins		Margin		Total
County	#	%	#	%	#	%	#	%	Total
Adair	2,771	70.06%	1,174	29.68%	10	0.25%	1,597	40.38%	3,955
Adams	1,468	70.75%	603	29.06%	4	0.19%	865	41.69%	2,075
Appanoose	4,419	70.82%	1,795	28.77%	26	0.42%	2,624	42.05%	6,240
Cass	4,850	71.39%	1,928	28.38%	16	0.24%	2,922	43.01%	6,794
Clarke	3,001	68.33%	1,375	31.31%	16	0.36%	1,626	37.02%	4,392
Dallas	32,742	53.08%	28,796	46.68%	144	0.23%	3,946	6.40%	61,682
Davis	2,881	75.30%	935	24.44%	10	0.26%	1,946	50.86%	3,826
Decatur	2,489	69.45%	1,073	29.94%	22	0.61%	1,416	39.51%	3,584
Greene	3,030	65.12%	1,613	34.67%	10	0.21%	1,417	30.45%	4,653
Guthrie	4,353	67.82%	2,046	31.88%	19	0.30%	2,307	35.94%	6,418
Lucas	3,259	72.70%	1,216	27.12%	8	0.18%	2,043	45.58%	4,483
Madison	6,655	67.85%	3,122	31.83%	31	0.32%	3,533	36.02%	9,808
Monroe	2,931	73.70%	1,039	26.13%	7	0.18%	1,892	47.57%	3,977
Montgomery	3,437	71.43%	1,364	28.35%	11	0.23%	2,073	43.08%	4,812
Page	5,077	71.84%	1,969	27.86%	21	0.30%	3,108	43.98%	7,067
Polk	110,970	44.27%	138,919	55.42%	768	0.31%	-27,949	-11.15%	250,657
Ringgold	1,914	73.53%	678	26.05%	11	0.42%	1,236	47.48%	2,603
Taylor	2,248	76.75%	673	22.98%	8	0.27%	1,575	53.77%	2,929
Union	3,835	66.17%	1,938	33.44%	23	0.40%	1,897	32.73%	5,796
Wapello	9,092	64.44%	4,993	35.39%	24	0.17%	4,099	29.05%	14,109
Wayne	2,324	76.32%	713	23.42%	8	0.26%	1,611	52.90%	3,045
Total	213,746	51.77%	197,962	47.94%	1,197	0.29%	15,784	3.83%	412,905

== District 4 ==
2024 Iowa's 4th congressional district election
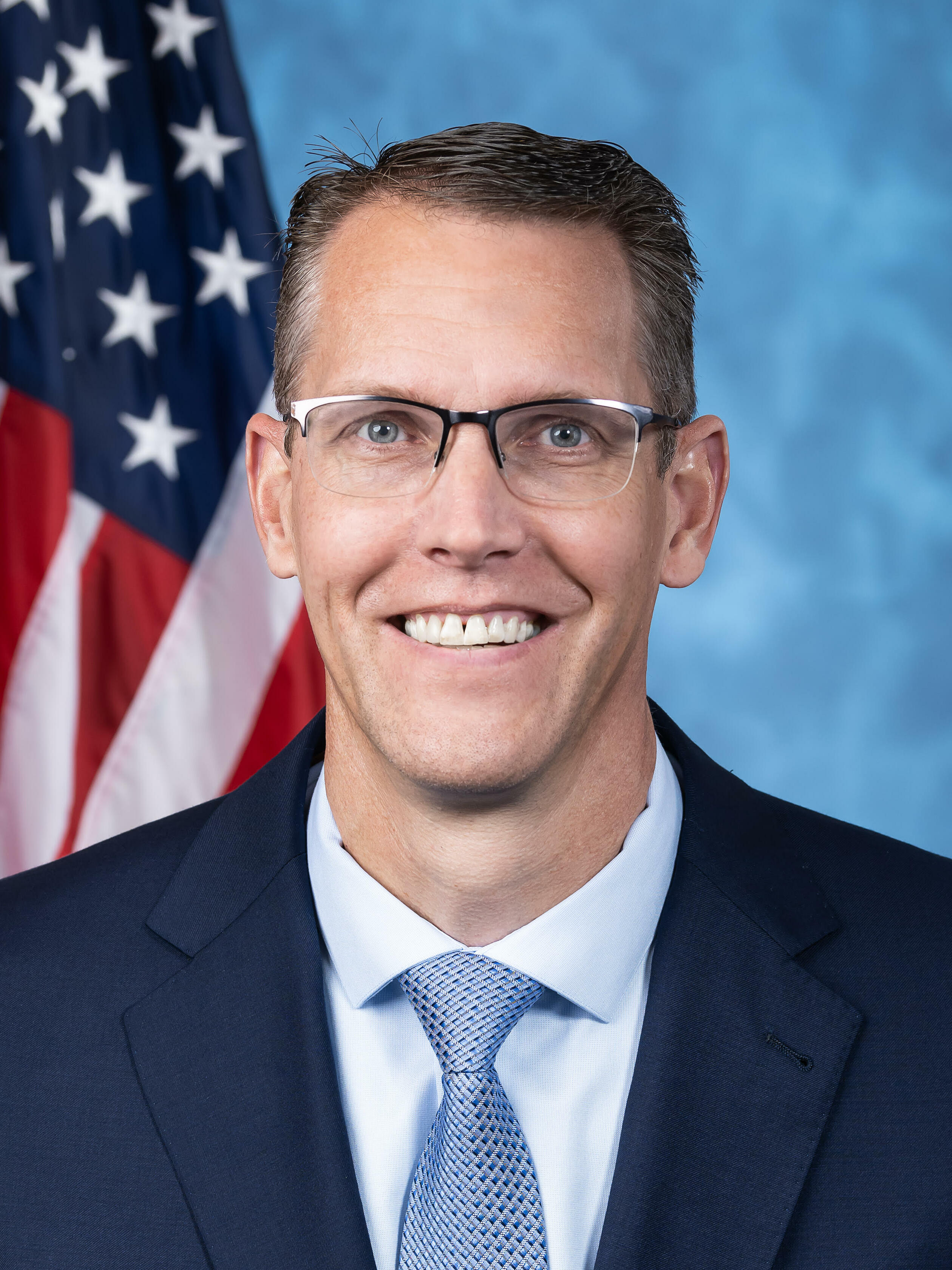

Nominee	Randy Feenstra	Ryan Melton
Party	Republican	Democratic
Popular vote	250,522	122,175
Percentage	67.0%	32.7%
- County results Feenstra: 50–60% 60–70% 70–80% 80–90% Melton: 50–60%
U.S. Representative before election
Randy Feenstra
Republican
Elected U.S. Representative
Randy Feenstra
Republican

The 4th district is based in northwestern Iowa and includes the cities of Ames and Sioux City. The incumbent was Republican Randy Feenstra, who was re-elected with 67.4% of the vote in 2022.

=== Republican primary ===
==== Nominee ====
- Randy Feenstra, incumbent U.S. representative

==== Eliminated in primary ====
- Kevin Virgil, former Army Ranger and CIA officer

==== Endorsements ====
Randy Feenstra

U.S. senators

- Joni Ernst, Iowa (2015–present)
- Chuck Grassley, Iowa (1981–present)

U.S. representatives

- Ashley Hinson, IA-02 (2021–present)
- Mariannette Miller-Meeks, IA-01 (2021–present)
- Zach Nunn, IA-03 (2023–present)

Statewide officials

- Brenna Bird, attorney general of Iowa (2023–present)
- Adam Gregg, lieutenant governor of Iowa (2019–2024)
- Mike Naig, Iowa secretary of agriculture (2018–present)
- Paul Pate, Iowa secretary of state (1995–1999, 2015–present)
- Kim Reynolds, governor of Iowa (2017–present)
- Roby Smith, Iowa state treasurer (2023–present)

State legislators

- 26 state legislators

Organizations

- AIPAC
- National Rifle Association Political Victory Fund
- National Right to Life Committee
- Republican Jewish Coalition
- U.S. Chamber of Commerce (post-primary)
Kevin Virgil

U.S. representatives

- Steve King, former U.S. representative for this district

==== Fundraising ====
2024 GOP primary results by county: Feenstra: 50–60%; 60–70%; 70–80%; Virgil: 50–60%; 60–70%

Campaign finance reports as of May 15, 2024
Candidate	Raised	Spent	Cash on hand
Randy Feenstra (R)	$3,315,383	$3,250,175	$1,088,896
Kevin Virgil (R)	$87,259	$82,865	$4,393
Source: Federal Election Commission

==== Results ====
Republican primary results
Party	Candidate	Votes	%
Republican	Randy Feenstra (incumbent)	26,781	60.3
Republican	Kevin Virgil	17,661	39.7
Total votes		44,442	100.0

=== Democratic primary ===
==== Nominee ====
- Ryan Melton, Nationwide insurance supervisor and nominee for this district in 2022

==== Endorsements ====
Ryan Melton

Individuals

- Kevin Virgil, former Army Ranger and CIA officer and former candidate for this district (Republican)

Labor unions

- Iowa AFL-CIO (post-primary)
- United Auto Workers (post-primary)

==== Fundraising ====
Campaign finance reports as of May 15, 2024
Candidate	Raised	Spent	Cash on hand
Ryan Melton (D)	$46,428	$30,896	$20,480
Source: Federal Election Commission

==== Results ====
Democratic primary results
Party	Candidate	Votes	%
Democratic	Ryan Melton	6,482	100.0
Total votes		6,482	100.0

=== Libertarian Party ===
==== Disqualified ====
- Charles Aldrich, industrial engineer (ran a write-in campaign)

=== General election ===
==== Predictions ====
Source	Ranking	As of
The Cook Political Report	Solid R	November 1, 2024
Elections Daily	Solid R	November 4, 2024
Inside Elections	Solid R	October 31, 2024
Sabato's Crystal Ball	Safe R	February 7, 2024
CNalysis	Solid R	November 4, 2024
Decision Desk HQ	Solid R	June 1, 2024

==== Polling ====
Hypothetical polling

Generic Republican vs. generic Democrat

Poll source	Date(s) administered	Sample size	Margin of error	Generic Republican	Generic Democrat	Other	Undecided
Selzer & Co.	October 28–31, 2024	185 (LV)	± 7.2%	53%	37%	5% (Note: "Wouldn't vote" with 3%; "Other" and "Don't want to tell" with 2%)	5%
Selzer & Co.	September 8–11, 2024	153 (LV)	± 7.9%	57%	38%	–	5%
Selzer & Co.	June 9–14, 2024	156 (LV)	± 7.9%	60%	35%	1%	5%
Selzer & Co.	February 25–28, 2024	166 (LV)	± 7.6%	63%	24%	2%	11%

==== Results ====
2024 Iowa's 4th congressional district election
Party	Candidate	Votes	%
Republican	Randy Feenstra (incumbent)	250,522	67.0
Democratic	Ryan Melton	122,175	32.7
Write-in		1,127	0.3
Total votes		373,824	100.0
Republican hold			

===== By county =====
County	Randy Feenstra Republican		Ryan Melton Democratic		Write-ins		Margin		Total
County	#	%	#	%	#	%	#	%	Total
Audubon	2,038	69.20%	901	30.59%	6	0.20%	1,137	38.61%	2,945
Boone	9,004	61.39%	5,636	38.42%	28	0.19%	3,368	22.97%	14,668
Buena Vista	4,635	67.47%	2,209	32.15%	26	0.38%	2,426	35.32%	6,870
Calhoun	3,541	73.80%	1,244	25.93%	13	0.27%	2,297	47.87%	4,798
Carroll	7,610	73.10%	2,785	26.75%	15	0.14%	4,825	46.35%	10,410
Cherokee	4,411	75.07%	1,436	24.44%	29	0.49%	2,975	50.63%	5,876
Clay	5,920	72.07%	2,253	27.43%	41	0.50%	3,667	44.64%	8,214
Crawford	4,390	72.51%	1,640	27.09%	24	0.40%	2,750	45.42%	6,054
Dickinson	7,974	73.08%	2,903	26.60%	35	0.32%	5,071	46.48%	10,912
Emmet	3,330	73.12%	1,215	26.68%	9	0.20%	2,115	46.44%	4,554
Franklin	3,342	72.34%	1,269	27.47%	9	0.19%	2,073	44.87%	4,620
Fremont	2,525	72.02%	974	27.78%	7	0.20%	1,551	44.24%	3,506
Hamilton	4,943	68.07%	2,300	31.67%	19	0.26%	2,643	36.40%	7,262
Hancock	4,175	73.53%	1,479	26.05%	24	0.42%	2,696	47.48%	5,678
Harrison	5,308	70.46%	2,180	28.94%	45	0.60%	3,128	41.52%	7,533
Humboldt	3,670	76.20%	1,133	23.53%	13	0.27%	2,537	52.67%	4,816
Ida	2,729	77.93%	760	21.70%	13	0.37%	1,969	56.23%	3,502
Kossuth	5,906	72.74%	2,196	27.05%	17	0.21%	3,710	45.69%	8,119
Lyon	5,790	86.25%	898	13.38%	25	0.37%	4,892	72.87%	6,713
Marshall	9,629	59.11%	6,635	40.73%	26	0.16%	2,994	18.38%	16,290
Mills	5,349	69.52%	2,319	30.14%	26	0.34%	3,030	39.38%	7,694
Monona	3,216	72.68%	1,187	26.82%	22	0.50%	2,029	45.86%	4,425
O'Brien	5,747	79.58%	1,369	18.96%	106	1.47%	4,378	60.62%	7,222
Osceola	2,563	82.86%	518	16.75%	12	0.39%	2,045	66.11%	3,093
Palo Alto	3,531	74.01%	1,234	25.86%	6	0.13%	2,297	48.15%	4,771
Plymouth	10,373	78.39%	2,810	21.23%	50	0.38%	7,563	57.16%	13,233
Pocahontas	2,668	78.61%	716	21.10%	10	0.29%	1,952	57.51%	3,394
Pottawattamie	26,212	61.61%	16,263	38.23%	68	0.16%	9,949	23.38%	42,543
Sac	3,961	76.41%	1,196	23.07%	27	0.52%	2,765	53.34%	5,184
Shelby	4,413	73.64%	1,569	26.18%	11	0.18%	2,844	47.46%	5,993
Sioux	16,164	87.44%	2,241	12.12%	80	0.43%	13,923	75.32%	18,485
Story	21,706	46.14%	25,233	53.63%	108	0.23%	-3,527	-7.49%	47,047
Webster	10,822	67.90%	5,082	31.89%	34	0.21%	5,740	36.01%	15,938
Winnebago	3,572	65.63%	1,859	34.15%	12	0.22%	1,713	31.48%	5,443
Woodbury	25,639	63.03%	14,928	36.70%	112	0.28%	10,711	26.33%	40,679
Worth	3,716	69.59%	1,605	30.06%	19	0.36%	2,111	39.53%	5,340
Total	250,522	67.02%	122,175	32.68%	1,127	0.30%	128,347	34.34%	373,824

== Notes ==
Partisan clients
