= Iowa's 85th House of Representatives district =

American legislative district

House District 85
- Type: District of the Lower house
- Location: Iowa
- Representative: Amy Nielsen
- Parent organization: Iowa General Assembly

The 85th District of the Iowa House of Representatives in the state of Iowa. It is currently composed of part of Johnson County.

== Current elected officials ==
Amy Nielsen is the representative currently representing the district.

== Past representatives ==
The district has previously been represented by:

- Norman Rodgers, 1971–1973
- Adrian B. Brinck, 1973–1975
- Clay R. Spear, 1975–1983
- Florence Buhr, 1983–1991
- Thomas Baker, 1991–1993
- Hubert Houser, 1993–2001
- Gerald D. Jones, 2001–2003
- Jim Lykam, 2003–2013
- Vicki Lensing, 2013–2021
- Christina Bohannan, 2021–2022
- Amy Nielsen, 2023-Present
