= Randy Feenstra =

American politician (born 1969)

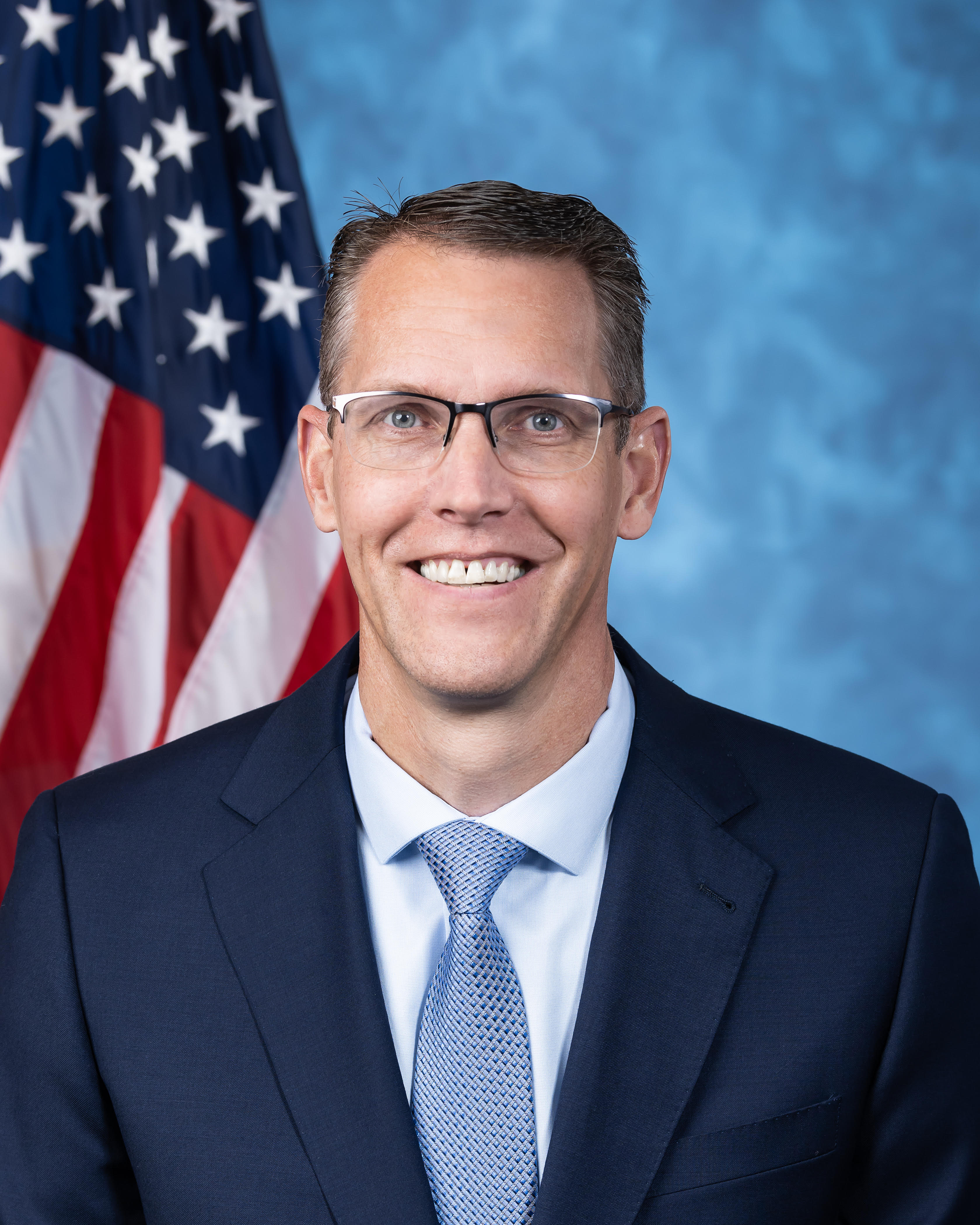
- Official portrait, 2021

Member of the U.S. House of Representatives from Iowa's 4th district
- Incumbent
- Assumed office January 3, 2021
- Preceded by: Steve King

Member of the Iowa Senate from the 2nd district
- In office January 11, 2009 – January 3, 2021
- Preceded by: Dave Mulder
- Succeeded by: Jeff Taylor

Treasurer of Sioux County
- In office 2006–2008
- Preceded by: Robert Hagey
- Succeeded by: Randy Jacobsma

Personal details
- Born: Randall Lee Feenstra; January 14, 1969 (age 57) Hull, Iowa, U.S.
- Party: Republican
- Spouse: Lynette Feenstra (m. 1996)
- Children: 4
- Education: Dordt University (BA); Iowa State University (MPA); Northcentral University (PhD)
- Website: House website Campaign website

Randall Lee Feenstra (born January 14, 1969) is an American politician and businessman serving as the U.S. representative for Iowa's 4th congressional district. The district covers the state's western border and its northwestern quadrant, including Sioux City, Ames, Council Bluffs, and Marshalltown. Feenstra retired in 2026 to run for Governor of Iowa. A member of the Republican Party, Feenstra served in the Iowa Senate from the 2nd district from 2009 to 2021. He was the Sioux County treasurer from 2006 to 2008.

Feenstra defeated incumbent Steve King in the primary election for the Republican nomination for Iowa's 4th congressional district in 2020. He defeated Democratic nominee J. D. Scholten in the general election by almost 25 points and was sworn into Congress on January 3, 2021.

Feenstra was a candidate in the Republican primary in the 2026 Iowa gubernatorial election. In an upset, he was narrowly defeated by businessman Zach Lahn, who lost the general election to Rob Sand.

== Early life and education ==
Randy Feenstra was born on January 14, 1969, to parents Lee and Eleanor Feenstra. He is of Dutch ancestry. In 1987, Feenstra graduated from Western Christian High School, where he played basketball. He received a Bachelor of Arts in business communications in 1991 from Dordt University, then known as Dordt College. He later earned a Master of Public Administration from Iowa State University. In 2022, Feenstra received a Doctor of Philosophy in business from Northcentral University.

== Early career ==
Feenstra began his career as sales manager for the Foreign Candy Company, known for being the first US company to import Warheads, later serving as city administrator of Hull for seven years. In 2006, he was elected Sioux County Treasurer, replacing Robert Hagey. Randy Jacobsma replaced Feenstra in a 2008 special election, as Feenstra won his first term in the Iowa Senate that year.

While serving in the Iowa Senate, Feenstra worked for ISB Insurance in Hull, operated by Iowa State Bank. In 2017, he joined the faculty of Dordt University, after having taught there in an adjunct capacity since 2011.

== Iowa State Senate ==
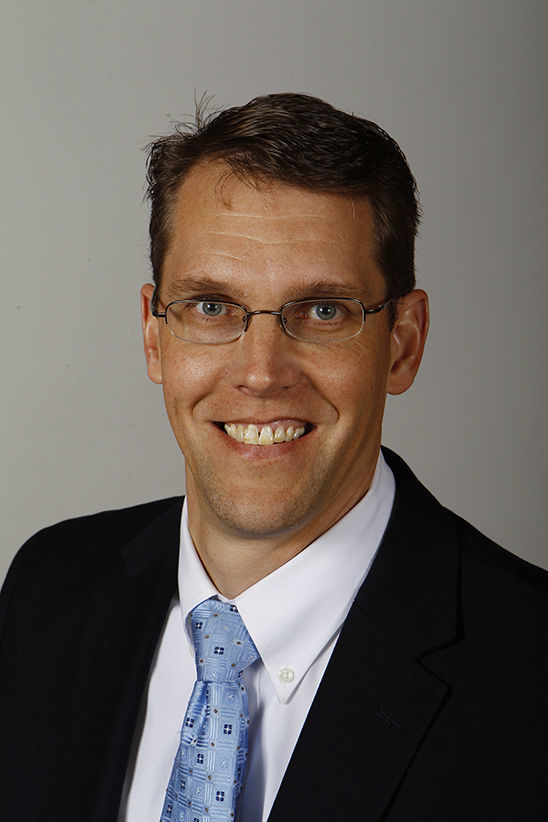
Feenstra during his tenure in the Iowa State Senate, 2011

Feenstra was elected to the Iowa State Senate in 2008 with 24,595 votes, running unopposed. He was reelected in 2012, again without opposition. He ran for a third uncontested term in 2016. In the Iowa Senate, Feenstra served on the Capital Projects, Fiscal, Tax Expenditure, Transportation, Ways and Means, and State Government Committee.

== U.S. House of Representatives ==
=== Elections ===
==== 2020 ====
In 2019, Feenstra announced that he would challenge incumbent Republican U.S. Representative Steve King in the 2020 Republican primary in Iowa's 4th congressional district. His State Senate district included much of the northwestern portion of Iowa's 4th congressional district. King, a nine-term incumbent, had a record of making inflammatory remarks. More specifically, King was stripped of his House committee memberships for asking why the term "white nationalist" was offensive. Feenstra noted King's inflammatory rhetoric in announcing his campaign, saying that King's "caustic nature" had left the 4th district "without a seat at the table."

Republican Party leadership supported Feenstra in the primary. Feenstra raised more money during the primary than King did, and was supported by the United States Chamber of Commerce and National Right to Life Committee. Feenstra's candidacy was also supported by conservative political commentator and radio host Ben Shapiro, who donated and urged his Twitter followers to donate to Feenstra's campaign.

Feenstra won the June 2 primary with 45.7% of the vote to King's 36%. Much of Feenstra's margin came from dominating his State Senate district, which he carried with almost 75% of the vote. He went on to defeat J. D. Scholten in the general election by a large margin.

2020 Republican primary election for Iowa's 4th Congressional District
Party	Candidate	Votes	%
Republican	Randy Feenstra	37,329	45.5
Republican	Steve King (incumbent)	29,366	35.9
Republican	Jeremy Taylor	6,418	7.8
Republican	Bret Richards	6,140	7.5
Republican	Steve Reeder	2,528	3.1
Write-in		176	0.2
Total votes		81,957	100.0

2020 election for U.S. Representative of Iowa's 4th Congressional District
Party	Candidate	Votes	%
Republican	Randy Feenstra	237,369	62.0
Democratic	J. D. Scholten	144,761	37.8
Write-in		892	0.2

==== 2022 ====
Feenstra ran for reelection in the district for the 2022 elections. He defeated Democrat Ryan Melton and Liberty candidate Bryan Holder by a wide margin.

2022 election for U.S. Representative of Iowa's 4th Congressional District
Party	Candidate	Votes	%	±%
Republican	Randy Feenstra (incumbent)	186,467	67.3	+5.3
Democratic	Ryan Melton	84,230	30.4	−7.4
Liberty Caucus	Bryan Jack Holder	6,035	2.2	N/A
Write-in		276	0.1	
Total votes		277,008	100.00	
Republican hold				

==== 2024 ====
In 2024, Feenstra defeated Kevin Virgil in the fourth district's Republican Party primary. In the general election, he faced Democratic candidate Ryan Melton for a second time. Feenstra won a third House term.

2024 Iowa's 4th congressional district election
Party	Candidate	Votes	%
Republican	Randy Feenstra (incumbent)	250,522	67.0
Democratic	Ryan Melton	122,175	32.7
Write-in		1,127	0.3
Total votes		373,824	100.0
Republican hold			

=== Tenure and political positions ===
==== Foreign policy ====
In June 2021, Feenstra was one of 49 House Republicans to vote to repeal the Authorization for Use of Military Force Against Iraq Resolution of 2002.

Feenstra voted to provide Israel with support following the 2023 Hamas attack on Israel. Feenstra had donations from AIPAC and related Israel affiliated PACs for a total amount of $106,694 as of July 24, 2026.

==== Trade ====
In January 2025, Feenstra praised President Donald Trump's proposals to implement 25% tariffs on most goods from Canada and Mexico, saying "Thank you, President Trump! Our country finally has an advocate for American farmers, families, and businesses in the White House!" According to the New York Times, Feenstra's message "was starkly at odds with the one coming from major groups representing farmers throughout the country, who issued statements warning of dire impacts on the nation's food producers."

=== Committee assignments ===
For the 118th Congress:

- Committee on Agriculture
  - Subcommittee on Livestock, Dairy, and Poultry
- Committee on Ways and Means
  - Subcommittee on Oversight
  - Subcommittee on Social Security
  - Subcommittee on Tax

=== Caucus memberships ===
- Republican Main Street Partnership
- Republican Study Committee
- Congressional Western Caucus

== 2026 campaign for governor of Iowa ==
In May 2025, Feenstra filed paperwork allowing him to begin raising funds for a potential campaign for governor of Iowa in 2026. Incumbent Gov. Kim Reynolds announced that she would not seek re-election. Feenstra officially launched his gubernatorial campaign in October 2025. Feenstra received the endorsement of President Donald Trump, while Republican opponent Zach Lahn's campaign was endorsed by former Rep. Steve King and by Turning Point Action.

On June 3, 2026, Feenstra was narrowly defeated by Lahn in the Republican primary. Feenstra conceded the race that evening and later endorsed Lahn in the general election. Feenstra's defeat marked the second time during the 2026 midterm elections that a Trump-endorsed candidate (Note: Including candidates for governor, the House, or the Senate.) lost a Republican primary. Politico described Feenstra's defeat as a "shocking upset".

== Personal life ==
Feenstra has been married to his wife Lynette since 1996. They have four children.

Feenstra is a Christian.

== Notes ==
U.S. House of Representatives
Preceded by Steve King	Member of the U.S. House of Representatives from Iowa's 4th congressional district 2021–present	Incumbent
U.S. order of precedence (ceremonial)
Preceded by Pat Fallon	United States representatives by seniority 248th	Succeeded by Michelle Fischbach
