= 2022 United States House of Representatives elections in Iowa =

- November 8, 2022

All 4 Iowa seats to the United States House of Representatives
	Majority party	Minority party
Party	Republican	Democratic
Last election	3	1
Seats won	4	0
Seat change	▲1	▼1
Popular vote	677,857	526,460
Percentage	55.94%	43.45%
Swing	▲3.52%	▼3.05%

Republican hold Republican gain
Republican
50–60%
60–70%
70–80%
80–90%
Democratic
50–60%
70–80%

The 2022 United States House of Representatives elections in Iowa were held on November 8, 2022, to elect the four U.S. representatives from the State of Iowa, one from each of the state's four congressional districts. The elections coincided with the other elections to the House of Representatives, elections to the United States Senate, and various state and local elections. These were the first congressional elections held in Iowa after the 2020 redistricting cycle.

Republicans won all four House seats, making this the first time since 1994 that Democrats had been completely shut out of Iowa's House delegation. This also marks the first time since 1956 that there were no Democrats in Iowa's congressional delegation.

== Background ==
In the 2020 elections, Republicans flipped the 1st and 2nd congressional districts while holding the 4th, while Democrats only managed to hold onto the 3rd. Iowa was considered to be an important state in the 2022 midterm elections, as Republicans only needed a net gain of five seats to flip the House of Representatives, and the 3rd district had one of the closest House elections won by a Democrat in 2020. At an event in 2021, United States Senator Ted Cruz (R-TX), claimed that the "road to the majority...comes through Iowa." However, Democrats remained optimistic, with former U.S. Representative Abby Finkenauer saying she "couldn't be more excited" about the roster of Iowa Democrats running for Congress in 2022.

== District 1 ==
2022 Iowa's 1st congressional district election
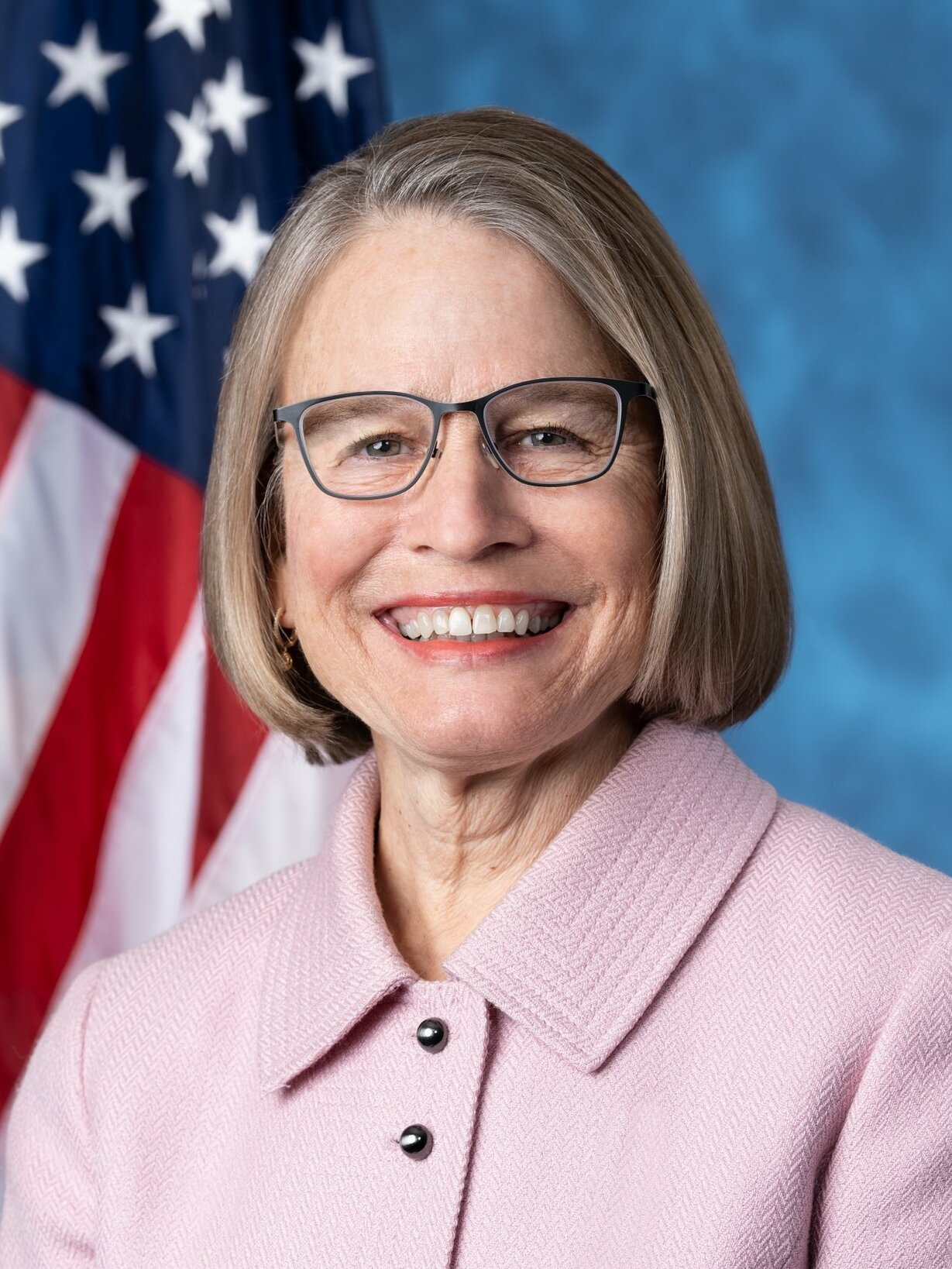

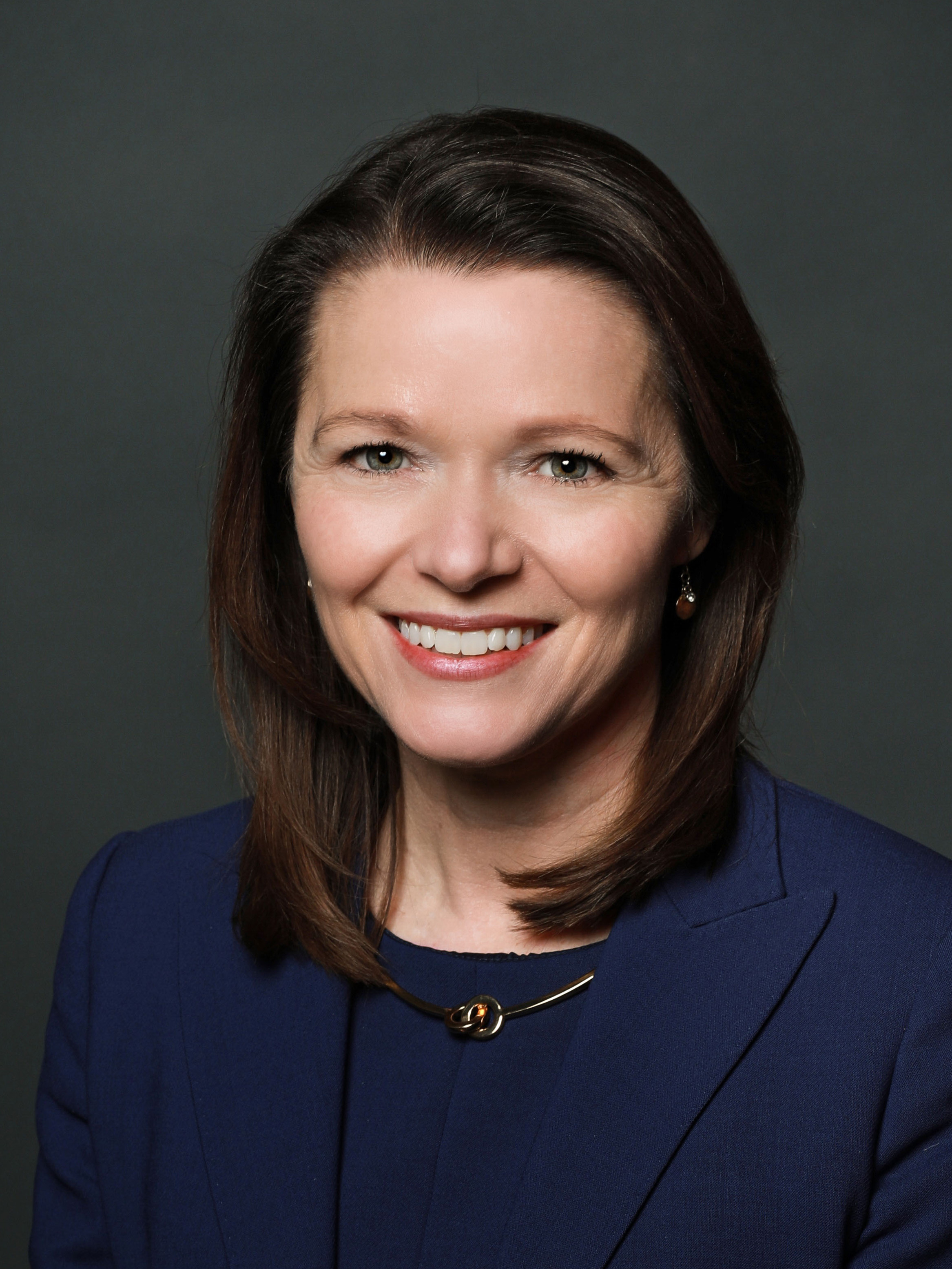
Nominee	Mariannette Miller-Meeks	Christina Bohannan
Party	Republican	Democratic
Popular vote	162,947	142,173
Percentage	53.4%	46.6%
- County results Miller-Meeks: 50–60% 60–70% 70–80% Bohannan: 70–80%
U.S. Representative before election
Mariannette Miller-Meeks
Republican
Elected U.S. Representative
Mariannette Miller-Meeks
Republican

After redistricting, most of the old 2nd district became the 1st district. The reconfigured 1st covers southeastern Iowa, and includes Davenport, Iowa City, Muscatine, Clinton, Burlington, Fort Madison, Oskaloosa, Bettendorf, Newton and Pella. The 1st district was based in northeastern Iowa, and included the cities of Dubuque, Cedar Rapids and Waterloo. First-term Republican Mariannette Miller-Meeks sought reelection in this district. Miller-Meeks flipped the 2nd district with 49.9% of the vote in 2020, defeating Democratic nominee Rita Hart by just six votes out of more than 394,000 cast, a margin of 0.002%.

=== Republican primary ===
==== Candidates ====
===== Nominee =====
- Mariannette Miller-Meeks, incumbent U.S. representative

==== Withdrawn ====
- Kyle Kuehl, business owner

==== Endorsements ====
Mariannette Miller-Meeks

Federal officials

- Terry Branstad, former ambassador to China (2017–2020) and former governor of Iowa (1983–1999, 2011–2017)
- Matthew Whitaker, former acting U.S. attorney general (2018–2019) and former U.S. attorney for the Southern District of Iowa (2004–2009)

U.S. senators

- Tom Cotton, Arkansas (2015–present)
- Joni Ernst, Iowa (2015–present)
- Chuck Grassley, Iowa (1981–present)
- Tim Scott, South Carolina (2013–present)

U.S. representatives

- Randy Feenstra, IA-4 (2021–present)
- Ashley Hinson, IA-2 (2021–present)

Statewide officials

- Kim Reynolds, governor of Iowa (2017–present)

State legislators

- Jeff Kaufmann, former HD-79 (2005–2013) and chair of the Republican Party of Iowa (2014–present)

Organizations

- Americans for Prosperity
- Citizens for Responsible Energy Solutions
- Maggie's List

==== Primary results ====
Republican primary results
Party	Candidate	Votes	%
Republican	Mariannette Miller-Meeks (incumbent)	41,260	98.7
Write-in		546	1.3
Total votes		41,806	100.0

=== Democratic primary ===
==== Candidates ====
===== Nominee =====
- Christina Bohannan, state representative

===== Withdrawn =====
- Joseph Kerner (ran for state house)

===== Declined =====
- Rita Hart, former state senator, nominee for lieutenant governor of Iowa in 2018, and nominee for this district in 2020

==== Endorsements ====
Christina Bohannan

Federal officials

- Cindy Axne, U.S. representative for Iowa's 3rd congressional district (2019–present)
- Jim Leach, former U.S. representative for this district (1977–2007) (Democrat, served in Congress as a Republican)
- Dave Loebsack, former U.S. representative for Iowa's 2nd congressional district (2007–2021)

Organizations

- 314 Action
- EMILY's List
- Everytown for Gun Safety Action Fund
- Human Rights Campaign PAC
- League of Conservation Voters
- NARAL Pro-Choice America
- New Democrat Coalition Action Fund
- Planned Parenthood Action Fund

Labor unions

- United Auto Workers

==== Primary results ====
Democratic primary results
Party	Candidate	Votes	%
Democratic	Christina Bohannan	37,475	99.7
Write-in		110	0.3
Total votes		37,585	100.0

=== General election ===
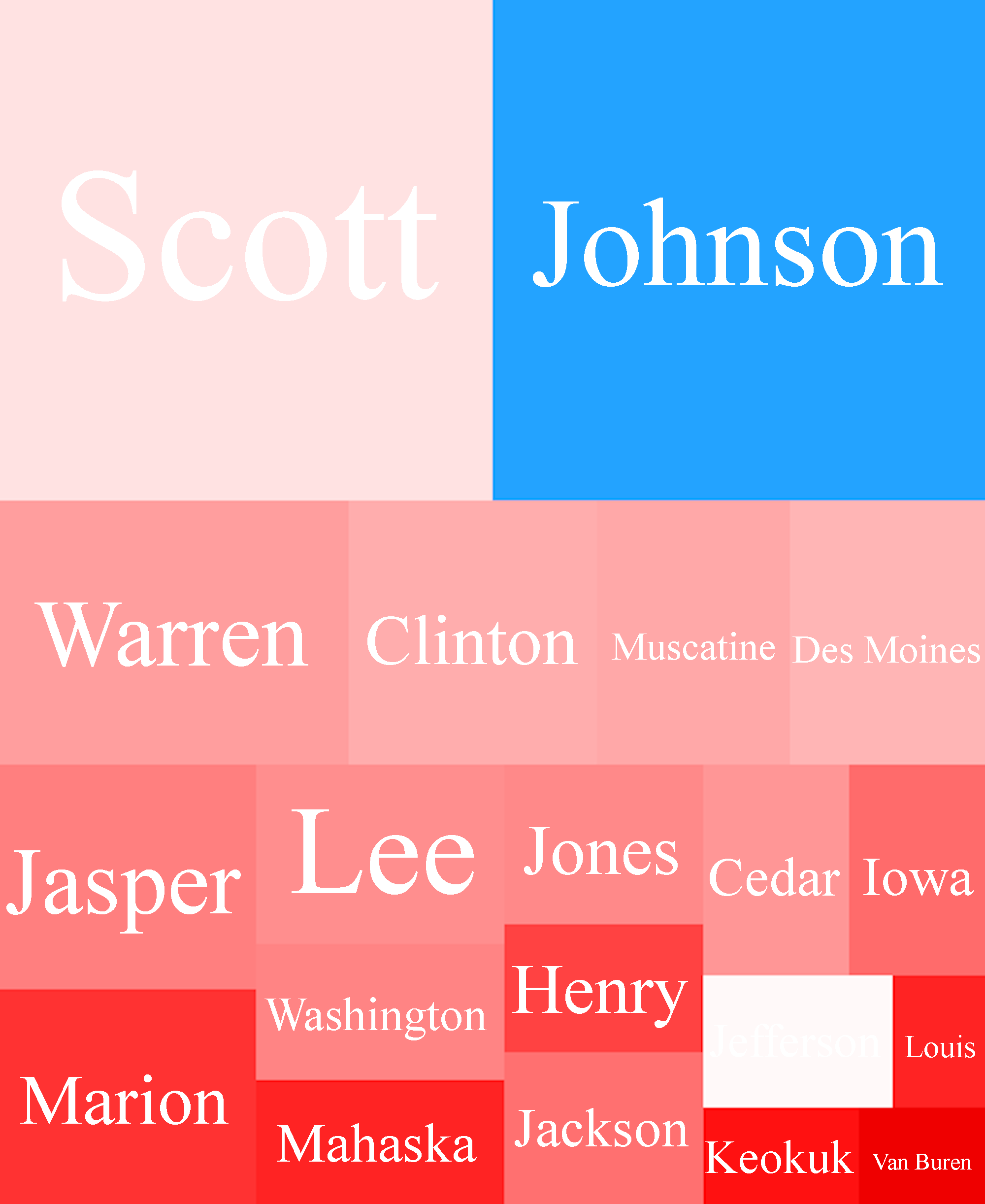
Cartogram of Iowa's first congressional district

==== Debate ====
2022 Iowa's 1st congressional district debate
No.	Date	Host	Moderator	Link	Republican	Democratic
Key: P Participant A Absent N Not invited I Invited W Withdrawn						
Key: P Participant A Absent N Not invited I Invited W Withdrawn					Mariannette Miller-Meeks	Christina Bohannan
1	Sep. 26, 2022	Iowa PBS	Kay Henderson		P	P

==== Predictions ====
Source	Ranking	As of
The Cook Political Report	Lean R	October 5, 2022
Inside Elections	Lean R	September 1, 2022
Sabato's Crystal Ball	Likely R	September 7, 2022
Politico	Lean R	August 12, 2022
RCP	Lean R	September 1, 2022
Fox News	Lean R	October 18, 2022
DDHQ	Solid R	September 6, 2022
FiveThirtyEight	Likely R	November 8, 2022
The Economist	Lean R	September 28, 2022

==== Polling ====
Graphical summary

Poll source	Date(s) administered	Sample size (Note: Key: A – all adults RV – registered voters LV – likely voters V – unclear)	Margin of error	Mariannette Miller-Meeks (R)	Christina Bohannan (D)	Undecided
Change Research (D) (Note: Poll sponsored by Michael Franken's campaign for U.S. Senate)	June 30 – July 4, 2022	375 (LV)	± 5.1%	39%	38%	22%
Public Policy Polling (D) (Note: Poll sponsored by 314 Action, which supports Bohannan)	April 5–6, 2022	534 (V)	± 3.4%	43%	47%	15%

Hypothetical polling

Generic Republican vs. generic Democrat

Poll source	Date(s) administered	Sample size	Margin of error	Generic Republican	Generic Democrat	Other	Undecided
Selzer & Co.	October 9–12, 2022	155 (LV)	± 8.4%	50%	41%	1%	8%
Selzer & Co.	July 10–13, 2022	149 (LV)	± 8.3%	50%	40%	–	10%

==== Results ====
2022 Iowa's 1st congressional district election
Party	Candidate	Votes	%
Republican	Mariannette Miller-Meeks (incumbent)	162,947	53.4
Democratic	Christina Bohannan	142,173	46.6
Write-in		260	0.1
Total votes		305,380	100.0
Republican hold			

== District 2 ==
2022 Iowa's 2nd congressional district election
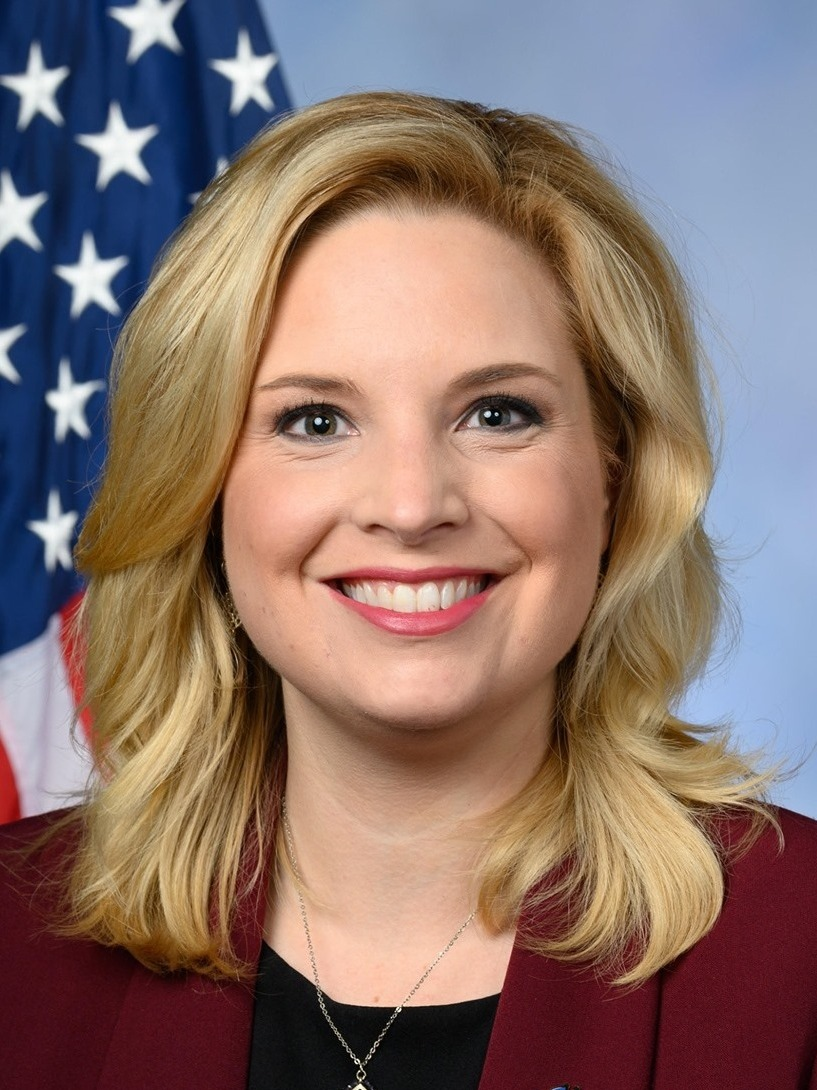

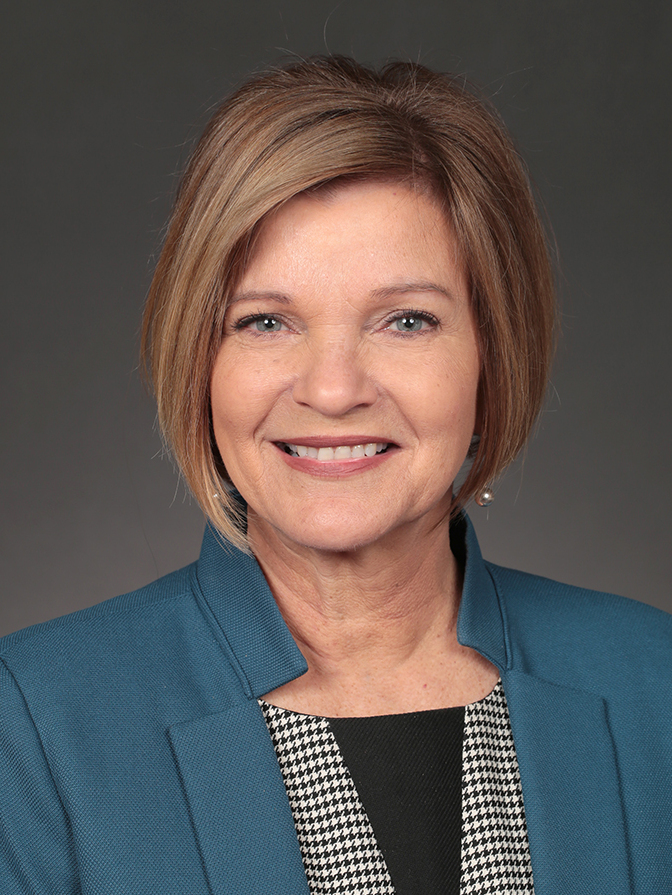
Nominee	Ashley Hinson	Liz Mathis
Party	Republican	Democratic
Popular vote	172,181	145,940
Percentage	54.1%	45.8%
- County results Hinson: 50–60% 60–70% 70–80% Mathis: 50–60%
U.S. Representative before election
Ashley Hinson
Republican
Elected U.S. Representative
Ashley Hinson
Republican

After redistricting, most of the old 1st district became the 2nd district. The reconfigured 2nd is located in northeastern Iowa and includes Dubuque, Cedar Rapids, Waterloo and Mason City. Freshman Republican Ashley Hinson, who flipped the district with 51.2% of the vote in 2020, sought reelection in the 2nd.

=== Republican primary ===
==== Candidates ====
===== Nominee =====
- Ashley Hinson, incumbent U.S. representative

==== Endorsements ====
Ashley Hinson

Federal officials

- Terry Branstad, former U.S. ambassador to China and former governor of Iowa
- Ted Cruz, U.S. senator from Texas and candidate for president in 2016
- Randy Feenstra, U.S. representative for Iowa's 4th congressional district
- Chuck Grassley, U.S. senator from Iowa
- Mariannette Miller-Meeks, U.S. representative for Iowa's 2nd congressional district
- Marco Rubio, U.S. senator from Florida and candidate for president in 2016
- Tim Scott, U.S. senator from South Carolina
- Donald Trump, former president of the United States

Statewide officials

- Kim Reynolds, governor of Iowa

Individuals

- Ronna McDaniel, chair of the Republican National Committee

Organizations

- Maggie's List

==== Primary results ====
Republican primary results
Party	Candidate	Votes	%
Republican	Ashley Hinson (incumbent)	39,897	99.3
Write-in		284	0.7
Total votes		40,181	100.0

=== Democratic primary ===
==== Candidates ====
===== Nominee =====
- Liz Mathis, state senator

===== Declined =====
- Abby Finkenauer, former U.S. representative (ran for the U.S. Senate)

==== Endorsements ====
Liz Mathis

Federal officials

- Cindy Axne, U.S. representative for Iowa's 3rd congressional district
- Bruce Braley, former U.S. representative for Iowa's 1st congressional district and nominee for U.S. Senate in 2014
- Roxanne Conlin, former U.S. attorney for the Southern District of Iowa and nominee for U.S. Senate in 2010
- Abby Finkenauer, former U.S. representative for Iowa's 1st congressional district
- Dave Loebsack, former U.S. representative for Iowa's 2nd congressional district

Statewide officials

- Mike Fitzgerald, Iowa state treasurer
- Patty Judge, former lieutenant governor of Iowa and nominee for U.S. Senate in 2016
- Tom Miller, Iowa attorney general
- Sally Pederson, former lieutenant governor of Iowa
- Rob Sand, Iowa state auditor

State legislators

- Ako Abdul-Samad, state representative
- Marti Anderson, state representative
- Liz Bennett, state representative
- Deborah Berry, former state representative
- Tony Bisignano, state senator
- Christina Bohannan, state representative and candidate for Iowa's 2nd congressional district in 2022
- Joe Bolkcom, assistant minority leader of the Iowa Senate
- Wes Breckenridge, state representative
- Timi Brown-Powers, state representative
- Sue Cahill, state representative
- Claire Celsi, state senator
- Molly Donahue, state representative
- Bill Dotzler, assistant minority leader of the Iowa Senate
- Bob Dvorsky, former state senator
- Tracy Ehlert, state representative
- Ro Foege, former state representative
- John Forbes, state representative
- Ruth Ann Gaines, state representative
- Eric Giddens, state senator
- Eric Gjerde, state representative
- Mike Gronstal, former state senator
- Chris Hall, state representative
- Beverly Hannon, former state senator
- Steve Hansen, state representative
- Rita Hart, former state senator, nominee for lieutenant governor of Iowa in 2018, and nominee for this district in 2020
- Bill Heckroth, former state senator
- Rob Hogg, state senator and candidate for U.S. Senate in 2016
- Wally Horn, former state senator
- Bruce Hunter, state representative
- Chuck Isenhart, state representative
- Dave Jacoby, state representative
- Lindsay James, state representative
- Pam Jochum, state senator
- Doris Kelley, former state representative
- Kevin Kinney, state senator
- Bob Kressig, state senator
- Monica Kurth, state representative
- Jim Lykam, state senator
- Mary Mascher, state representative
- Charlie McConkey, state representative
- Andy McKean, former state representative
- Brian Meyer, state representative
- Amy Nielsen, state representative
- Rick Olson, state representative
- Tyler Olson, Cedar Rapids city councilor, former state representative, and former chair of the Iowa Democratic Party
- Bob Osterhaus, former state representative
- Janet Petersen, state senator
- Todd Prichard, state representative
- Amanda Ragan, state senator
- Patti Ruff, former state representative
- Kirsten Running-Marquardt, state representative
- Bob Rush, former state senator
- Brian Schoenjahn, former state senator
- Jackie Smith, state senator
- Mark Smith, former state representative
- Steve Sodders, mayor of State Center and former state senator
- Art Staed, state representative
- Sally Stutsman, former state representative
- Kristin Sunde, state representative
- Todd Taylor, state senator
- Jane Teaford, former state representative
- Phyllis Thede, state representative
- Roger Thomas, former state representative
- Sarah Trone Garriott, state senator
- Zach Wahls, minority leader of the Iowa Senate
- Beth Wessel-Kroeschell, state representative
- Nate Willems, former state senator
- Dave Williams, state representative
- Cindy Winckler, state representative
- William Witt, former state representative
- Mary Wolfe, state representative

Local officials

- Linda Langston, director of strategic relations at the National Association of Counties and former Linn County supervisor

Individuals

- Deidre DeJear, nominee for governor of Iowa in 2022 and nominee for Iowa secretary of state in 2018
- Theresa Greenfield, real estate broker and nominee for U.S. Senate in 2020
- Andy McGuire, former chair of the Iowa Democratic Party
- Monica Vernon, former mayor pro tem of Cedar Rapids
- Christie Vilsack, former First Lady of Iowa and nominee for Iowa's 4th congressional district in 2012

Organizations

- EMILY's List
- Human Rights Campaign PAC
- League of Conservation Voters
- NARAL Pro-Choice America
- New Democrat Coalition Action Fund
- Planned Parenthood Action Fund

Labor unions

- American Federation of State, County and Municipal Employees
- United Auto Workers

==== Primary results ====
Democratic primary results
Party	Candidate	Votes	%
Democratic	Liz Mathis	40,737	99.6
Write-in		150	0.4
Total votes		40,887	100.0

=== General election ===
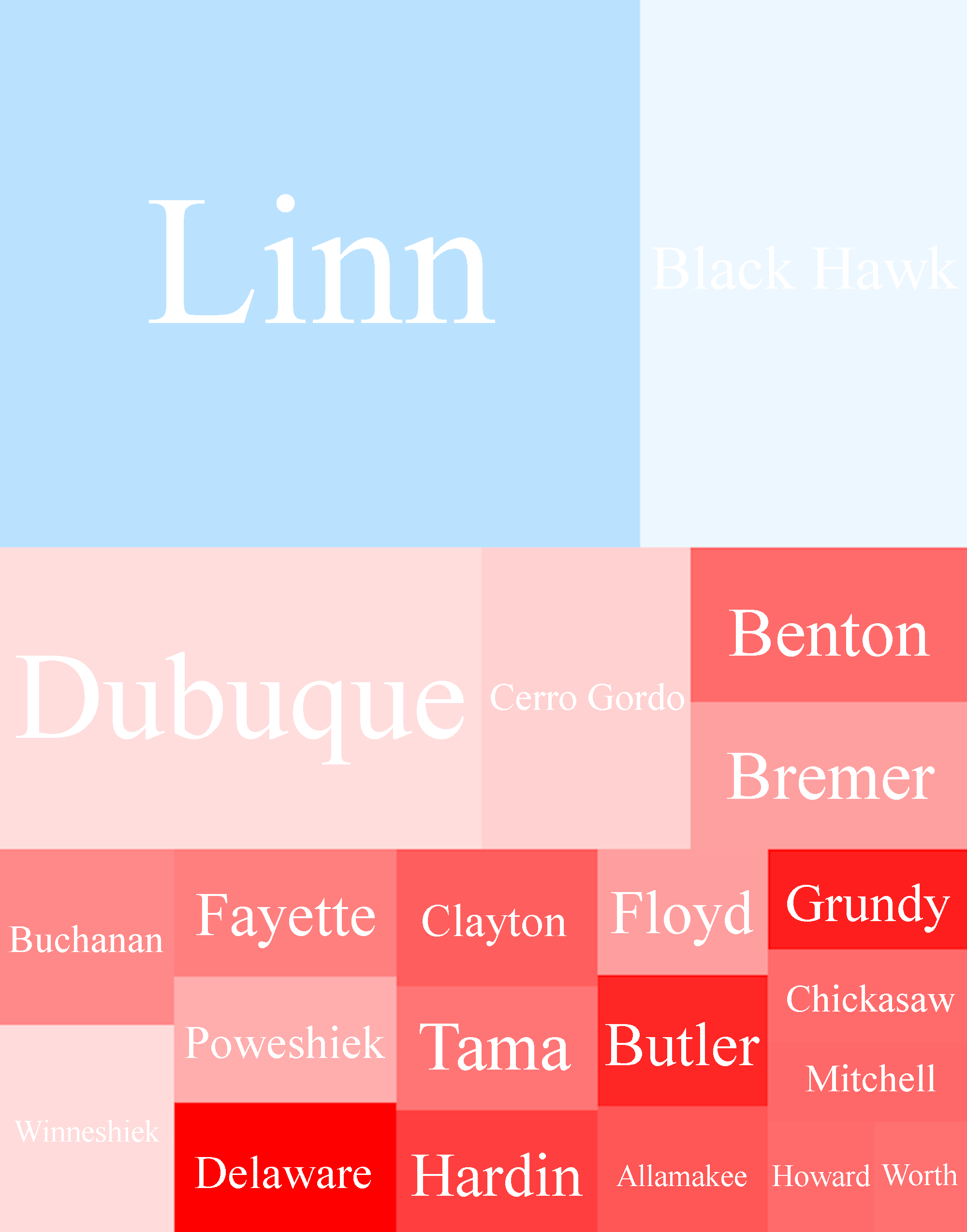
Cartogram of Iowa's second congressional district

==== Predictions ====
Source	Ranking	As of
The Cook Political Report	Lean R	October 25, 2022
Inside Elections	Tilt R	October 21, 2022
Sabato's Crystal Ball	Likely R	September 7, 2022
Politico	Lean R	August 12, 2022
RCP	Likely R	September 1, 2022
Fox News	Likely R	August 22, 2022
DDHQ	Solid R	September 6, 2022
FiveThirtyEight	Likely R	September 7, 2022
The Economist	Lean R	September 28, 2022

==== Polling ====
Graphical summary

Poll source	Date(s) administered	Sample size	Margin of error	Ashley Hinson (R)	Liz Mathis (D)	Undecided
Public Policy Polling (D) (Note: Poll sponsored by Mathis's campaign)	July 19–20, 2022	594 (V)	± 4.0%	44%	44%	12%
Public Policy Polling (D)	February 2–3, 2022	623 (V)	± 3.9%	43%	42%	15%

Hypothetical polling

Generic Republican vs. generic Democrat

Poll source	Date(s) administered	Sample size	Margin of error	Generic Republican	Generic Democrat	Other	Undecided
Selzer & Co.	October 9–12, 2022	155 (LV)	± 8.4%	46%	48%	1%	5%
Public Policy Polling (D)	July 19–20, 2022	594 (V)	± 4.0%	50%	43%	–	7%
Selzer & Co.	July 10–13, 2022	149 (LV)	± 8.3%	54%	42%	–	5%
Public Policy Polling (D)	February 2–3, 2022	623 (V)	± 3.9%	45%	42%	13%	

==== Results ====
2022 Iowa's 2nd congressional district election
Party	Candidate	Votes	%
Republican	Ashley Hinson (incumbent)	172,181	54.1
Democratic	Liz Mathis	145,940	45.8
Write-in		278	0.1
Total votes		318,399	100.0
Republican hold			

== District 3 ==
2022 Iowa's 3rd congressional district election
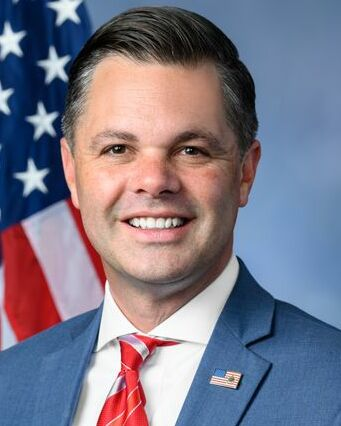

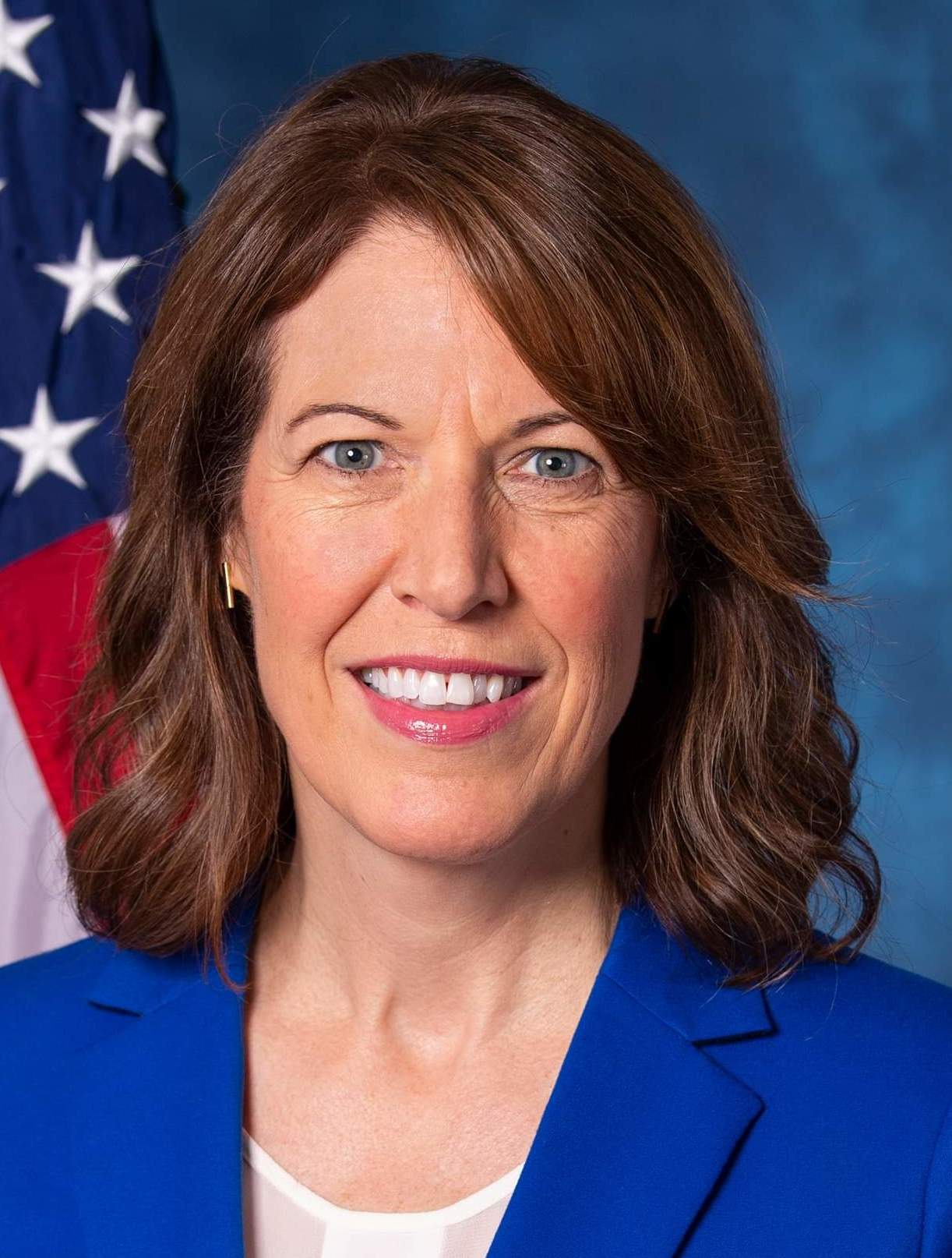
Nominee	Zach Nunn	Cindy Axne
Party	Republican	Democratic
Popular vote	156,262	154,117
Percentage	50.2%	49.6%
- County results Nunn: 50–60% 60–70% 70–80% Axne: 50–60%
U.S. Representative before election
Cindy Axne
Democratic
Elected U.S. Representative
Zach Nunn
Republican

Before redistricting, the 3rd district encompassed southwestern Iowa, stretching from Des Moines to the state's borders with Nebraska and Missouri. The new 3rd is still anchored in Des Moines, but now covers south-central Iowa. The incumbent was Democrat Cindy Axne, who was re-elected with 48.9% of the vote in 2020.

During the campaign, a research firm contracted by the Democratic Congressional Campaign Committee inappropriately obtained the military records of then-candidate Zach Nunn.

=== Democratic primary ===
==== Candidates ====
===== Nominee =====
- Cindy Axne, incumbent U.S. representative

===== Endorsements =====
Cindy Axne

Organizations

- American Israel Public Affairs Committee
- EMILY's List
- Feminist Majority PAC
- Giffords
- Humane Society of the United States Legislative Fund
- Jewish Democratic Council of America
- League of Conservation Voters
- NARAL Pro-Choice America
- National Women's Political Caucus
- Natural Resources Defense Council
- Planned Parenthood Action Fund
- Sierra Club

Labor unions

- National Education Association
- United Auto Workers

==== Primary results ====
Democratic primary results
Party	Candidate	Votes	%
Democratic	Cindy Axne (incumbent)	47,710	99.5
Write-in		252	0.5
Total votes		47,962	100.0

=== Republican primary ===
==== Candidates ====
===== Nominee =====
- Zach Nunn, state senator

===== Eliminated in primary =====
- Nicole Hasso, financial planner
- Gary Leffler, construction consultant

===== Withdrawn =====
- Mary Ann Hanusa, former state representative (running for state auditor)

==== Endorsements ====
Nicole Hasso

U.S. senators

- Ted Cruz, U.S. senator from Texas (2013–present) and candidate for president in 2016
Zach Nunn

U.S. executive branch officials

- Mike Pompeo, 70th U.S. secretary of state (2018–2021) and former Director of the Central Intelligence Agency (2017–2018)
- Donald Trump, 45th president of the United States (2017–2021)
- Ryan Zinke, 52nd U.S. secretary of the interior (2017–2019) and U.S. representative for Montana's at-large congressional district (2015–2017)

Organizations

- Americans for Prosperity
- SEAL PAC

==== Debates and forums ====
2022 IA-03 Republican primary debates and forums
No.	Date	Host	Moderator	Link	Participants		
P Participant A Absent N Non-invitee I Invitee W Withdrawn							
P Participant A Absent N Non-invitee I Invitee W Withdrawn					Hasso	Leffler	Nunn
1	May 3, 2022	Polk County Republican Party; WHO-DT	Dave Price	Youtube (Part 1); YouTube (Part 2)	P	P	P
2	May 14, 2022	KCCI	Stacey Horst and Laura Terrell	YouTube	P	P	P

==== Polling ====
Poll source	Date(s) administered	Sample size	Margin of error	Mary Ann Hanusa	Nicole Hasso	Zach Nunn	Undecided
Moore Information Group (R) (Note: Poll sponsored by Nunn's campaign)	September 9, 2021	1,000 (LV)	± 3.0%	13%	3%	24%	60%

==== Primary results ====
Republican primary results
Party	Candidate	Votes	%
Republican	Zach Nunn	30,502	65.8
Republican	Nicole Hasso	8,991	19.4
Republican	Gary Leffler	6,800	14.7
Write-in		89	0.2
Total votes		46,382	100.0

=== General election ===
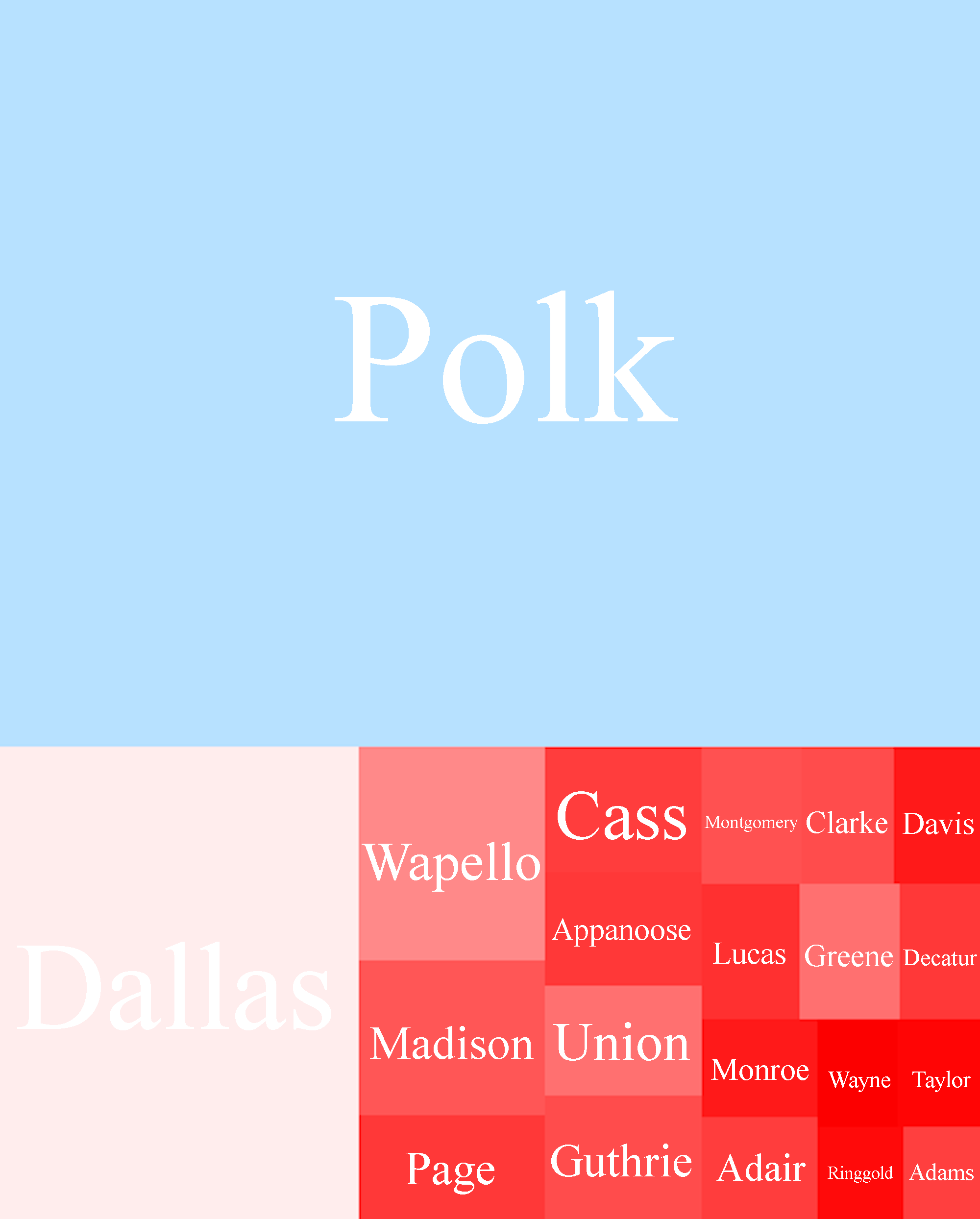
Cartogram of Iowa's third congressional district

==== Debate ====
2022 Iowa's 3rd congressional district debate
No.	Date	Host	Moderator	Link	Democratic	Republican
Key: P Participant A Absent N Not invited I Invited W Withdrawn						
Key: P Participant A Absent N Not invited I Invited W Withdrawn					Cindy Axne	Zach Nunn
1	Oct. 6, 2022	KCCI	Eric Hanson; Stacy Horst	YouTube	P	P

==== Predictions ====
Source	Ranking	As of
The Cook Political Report	Lean R (flip)	September 1, 2022
Inside Elections	Tilt R (flip)	November 3, 2022
Sabato's Crystal Ball	Lean R (flip)	September 7, 2022
Politico	Lean R (flip)	November 3, 2022
RCP	Lean R (flip)	September 1, 2022
Fox News	Lean R (flip)	August 22, 2022
DDHQ	Tossup	September 23, 2022
FiveThirtyEight	Tossup	November 8, 2022
The Economist	Tossup	September 28, 2022

==== Polling ====
Aggregate polls

Source of poll aggregation	Dates administered	Dates updated	Cindy Axne (D)	Zach Nunn (R)	Undecided (Note: Calculated by taking the difference of 100% and all other candidates combined.)	Margin
FiveThirtyEight	July 9 – October 25, 2022	November 1, 2022	44.3%	46.4%	9.3%	Nunn +2.1

Graphical summary

Poll source	Date(s) administered	Sample size	Margin of error	Cindy Axne (D)	Zach Nunn (R)	Other	Undecided
Moore Information Group (R)	October 24–25, 2022	400 (LV)	± 5.0%	44%	46%	–	10%
Moore Information Group (R)	September 21–25, 2022	400 (LV)	± 5.0%	44%	46%	–	10%
Impact Research (D) (Note: Poll sponsored by Axne's campaign)	September 7–11, 2022	500 (LV)	± 4.4%	47%	47%	–	5%
RMG Research	July 29 – August 5, 2022	400 (LV)	± 4.9%	41%	49%	2%	8%
Moore Information Group (R) (Note: Poll sponsored jointly by the National Republican Congressional Committee and Nunn's campaign committee)	July 9–11, 2022	400 (LV)	± 5.0%	43%	43%	–	14%
Moore Information Group (R)	September 9, 2021	– (LV)	–	46%	42%	–	12%

Hypothetical polling

Generic Democrat vs. generic Republican

Poll source	Date(s) administered	Sample size	Margin of error	Generic Democrat	Generic Republican	Other	Undecided
Selzer & Co.	October 9–12, 2022	155 (LV)	± 8.4%	49%	48%	0%	3%
Selzer & Co.	July 10–13, 2022	150 (LV)	± 8.3%	47%	44%	–	9%

==== Results ====
2022 Iowa's 3rd congressional district election
Party	Candidate	Votes	%
Republican	Zach Nunn	156,262	50.2
Democratic	Cindy Axne (incumbent)	154,117	49.6
Write-in		534	0.2
Total votes		310,913	100.0
Republican gain from Democratic			

== District 4 ==
2022 Iowa's 4th congressional district election
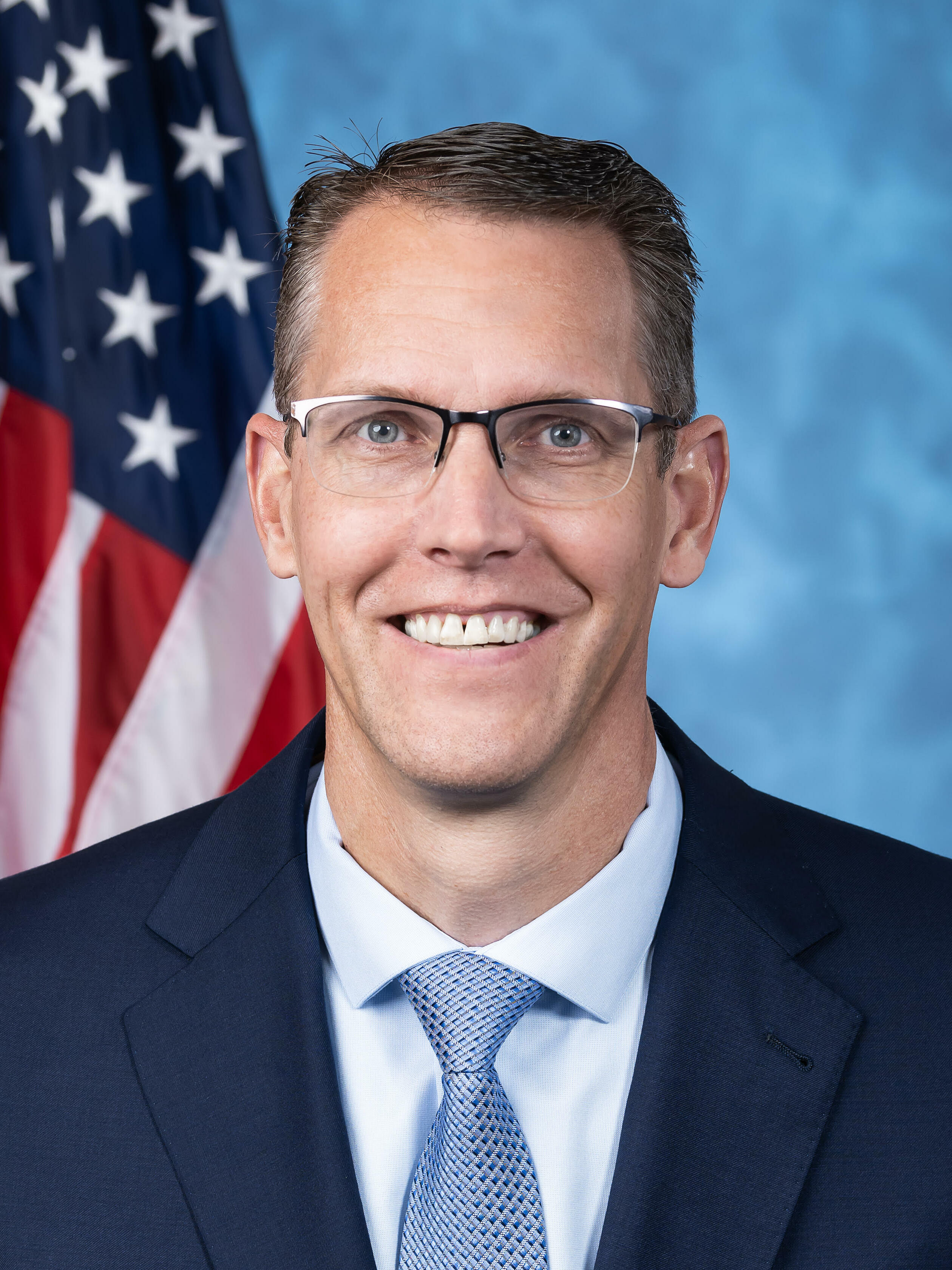

Nominee	Randy Feenstra	Ryan Melton
Party	Republican	Democratic
Popular vote	186,467	84,230
Percentage	67.3%	30.4%
- County results Feenstra: 50–60% 60–70% 70–80% 80–90% Melton: 50–60%
U.S. Representative before election
Randy Feenstra
Republican
Elected U.S. Representative
Randy Feenstra
Republican

Before redistricting, the 4th district was based in northwestern Iowa, including Sioux City, Ames, Mason City, Fort Dodge, Boone and Carroll. The redrawn 4th also covers much of southwestern Iowa, including Council Bluffs. The incumbent was Republican Randy Feenstra, who was elected with 62.0% of the vote in 2020.

=== Republican primary ===
==== Candidates ====
===== Nominee =====
- Randy Feenstra, incumbent U.S. representative

==== Endorsements ====
Randy Feenstra

Executive branch officials

- Nikki Haley, former U.S. ambassador to the United Nations (2017–2019) and former governor of South Carolina (2011–2017)
- Mike Pence, former vice president of the United States
- Donald Trump, former president of the United States

==== Primary results ====
Republican primary results
Party	Candidate	Votes	%
Republican	Randy Feenstra (incumbent)	51,271	98.9
Write-in		596	1.1
Total votes		51,867	100.0

=== Democratic primary ===
==== Candidates ====
===== Nominee =====
- Ryan Melton, Nationwide insurance supervisor

===== Declined =====
- J. D. Scholten, former professional baseball player and nominee for this district in 2018 and 2020 (running for state house)

==== Primary results ====
Democratic primary results
Party	Candidate	Votes	%
Democratic	Ryan Melton	20,794	99.7
Write-in		69	0.3
Total votes		20,863	100.0

=== Other parties and independents ===
==== Candidates ====
- Bryan Jack Holder, photographer and perennial candidate (Liberty)

=== General election ===
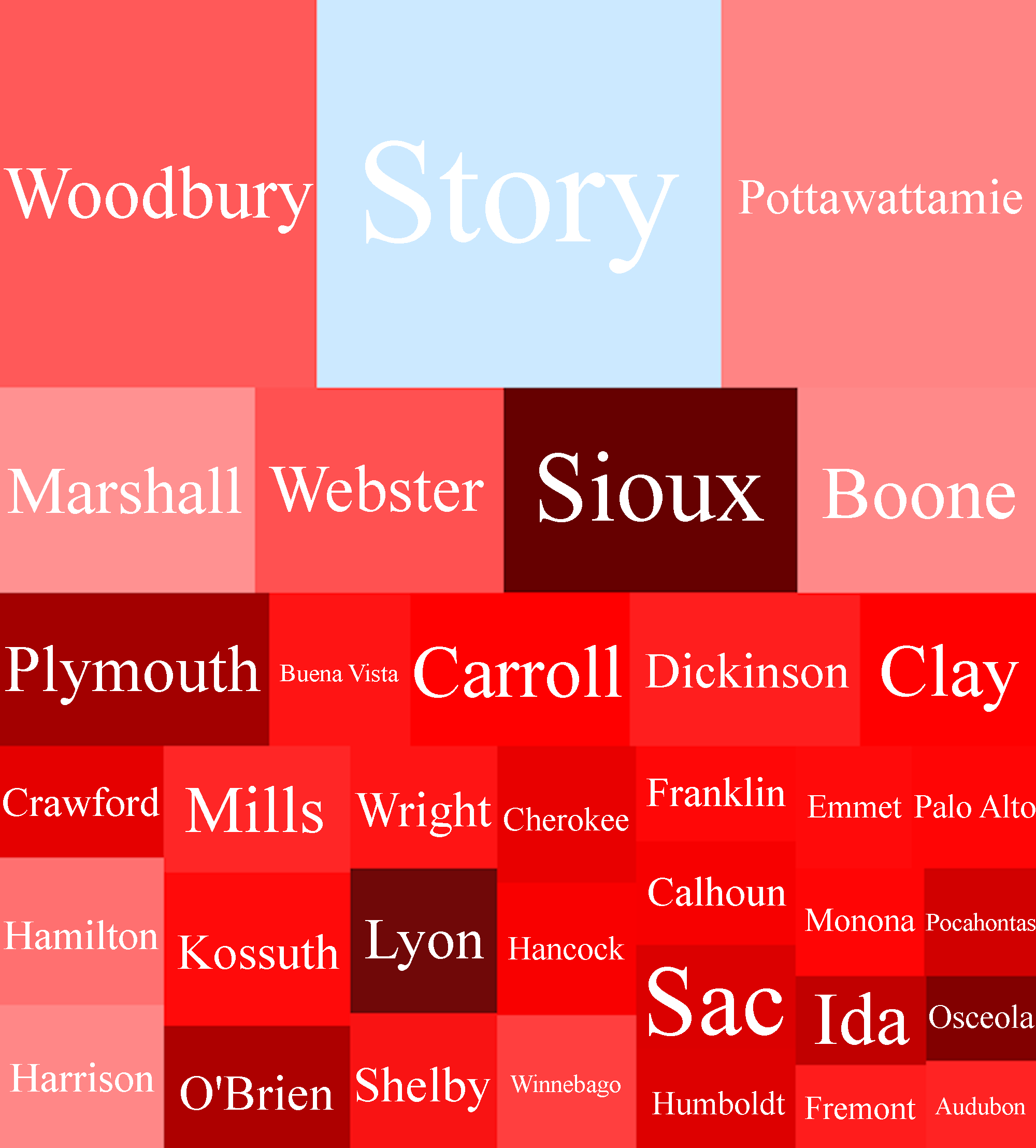
Cartogram of Iowa's fourth congressional district

==== Predictions ====
Source	Ranking	As of
The Cook Political Report	Solid R	September 1, 2022
Inside Elections	Solid R	September 1, 2022
Sabato's Crystal Ball	Safe R	September 7, 2022
Politico	Solid R	April 5, 2022
RCP	Safe R	September 1, 2022
Fox News	Solid R	August 22, 2022
DDHQ	Solid R	September 6, 2022
FiveThirtyEight	Solid R	September 7, 2022
The Economist	Safe R	September 28, 2022

=== Polling ===
Hypothetical polling

Generic Republican vs. generic Democrat

Poll source	Date(s) administered	Sample size	Margin of error	Generic Republican	Generic Democrat	Other	Undecided
Selzer & Co.	October 9–12, 2022	155 (LV)	± 8.4%	62%	33%	1%	4%
Selzer & Co.	July 10–13, 2022	149 (LV)	± 8.3%	55%	36%	–	8%

==== Results ====
2022 Iowa's 4th congressional district election
Party	Candidate	Votes	%
Republican	Randy Feenstra (incumbent)	186,467	67.3
Democratic	Ryan Melton	84,230	30.4
Liberty Caucus	Bryan Jack Holder	6,035	2.2
Write-in		276	0.1
Total votes		277,008	100.0
Republican hold			

== See also ==
- 2022 Iowa elections

== Notes ==
Partisan clients
