= Vicki Lensing =

American politician (born 1957)

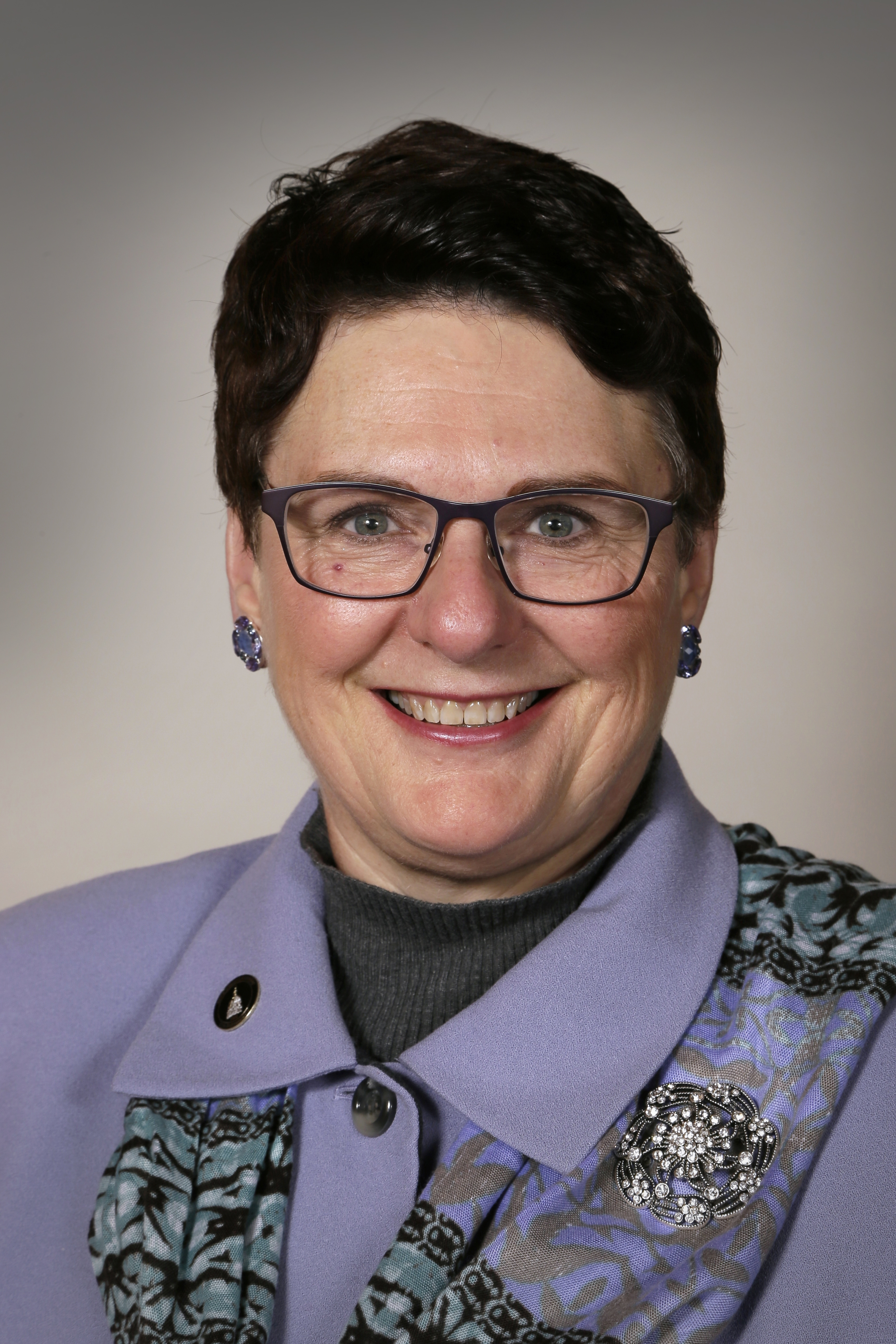

Member of the Iowa House of Representatives from the 85th district
- In office January 14, 2013 – January 10, 2021
- Preceded by: Jim Lykam
- Succeeded by: Christina Bohannan

Member of the Iowa House of Representatives from the 78th district
- In office January 13, 2003 – January 13, 2013
- Preceded by: Clel Baudler
- Succeeded by: Jarad Klein

Member of the Iowa House of Representatives from the 45th district
- In office January 8, 2001 – January 12, 2003
- Preceded by: Minnette Doderer
- Succeeded by: Jane Greimann

Personal details
- Born: June 21, 1957 (age 68) Iowa City, Iowa, U.S.
- Party: Democratic
- Spouse: Rich Templeton
- Education: University of Iowa (BA)
- Website: legis.state.ia.us

Vicki S. Lensing (born June 21, 1957) is an American politician who served as a member of the Iowa House of Representatives from 2001 to 2021.

== Education ==
Lensing graduated from West High School in 1975 and obtained her Bachelor of Arts from the University of Iowa in 1979.

== Career ==
Lensing grew up around her grandparents' family business, Mott's Drug Store. She is a co-owner of Lensing Funeral & Cremation Service. Lensing was recognized as a Woman of Influence and received the Friend of the Family Farmer Award from the Iowa Farmers Union in 2009.

Lensing defeated Cathy Kern in a party primary in 2000, then won the general election against Republican Party candidate Paul Heyn. She won every subsequent general election unopposed. In 2020, Lensing was defeated in the Democratic primary by Christina Bohannan.

Lensing served on the Environmental Protection committee, the Judiciary committee, the State Government committee, the Government Oversight committee, and the Administration and Regulation Appropriations subcommittees.

== Personal life ==
She is married to Rich Templeton. She was previously married to Michael Lensing, with whom she shares three children.
