= Christina Bohannan =

American politician, legal scholar and engineer (born 1971)

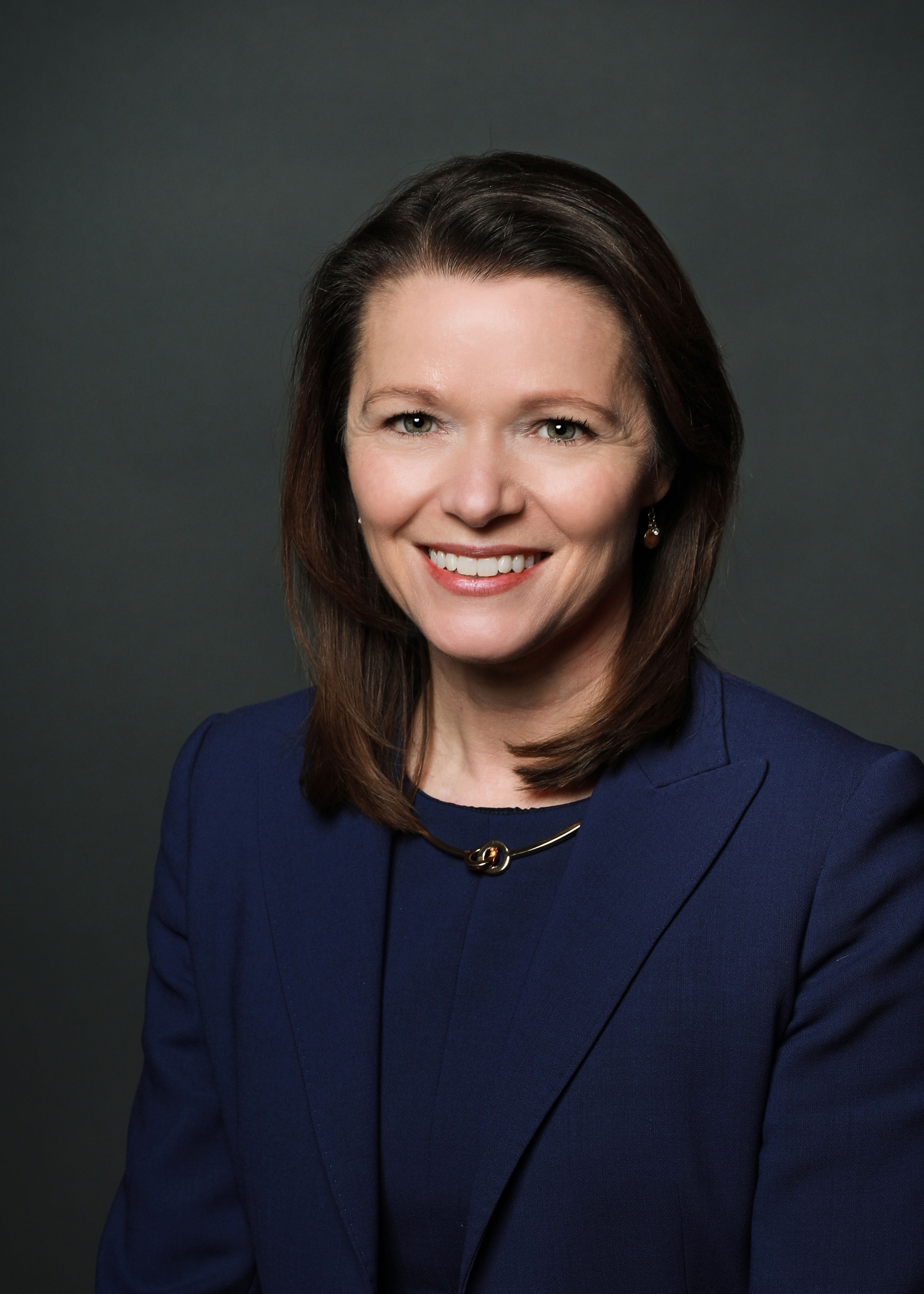
- Official portrait, 2021

Member-elect of the U.S. House of Representatives from Iowa's 1st district
- Assuming office January 3, 2027
- Succeeding: Mariannette Miller-Meeks

Member of the Iowa House of Representatives from the 85th district
- In office January 11, 2021 – January 9, 2023
- Preceded by: Vicki Lensing
- Succeeded by: Adam Zabner

Personal details
- Born: July 2, 1971 (age 55) Thomasville, Georgia, U.S.
- Party: Democratic
- Children: 1
- Education: University of Florida (BS, JD)
- Website: State House website Campaign website

Christina Bohannan (born July 2, 1971) is an American politician and law professor who is the representative-elect for Iowa's 1st congressional district in the United States House of Representatives. A member of the Democratic Party, she served from 2021 to 2023 as the Iowa state representative for the 85th House district, having been elected in 2020 to succeed Vicki Lensing.

Bohannan was the unsuccessful Democratic nominee for Iowa's 1st congressional district in 2022 and 2024, losing to Republican incumbent Mariannette Miller-Meeks. She won the 2026 election, defeating Miller-Meeks on her third try.

== Early life and education ==
Bohannan was born in 1971 in Thomasville, Georgia, and grew up in Nocatee, Florida. She grew up in a trailer home in a town of around 700 people. She was the youngest of three children. Her father was a construction worker, and her mother worked at a daycare. Neither of her parents graduated from high school. She graduated from DeSoto High School in Arcadia, Florida.

When Bohannan was a child, her father developed emphysema. Because emphysema constitutes a preexisting condition, he struggled to get health insurance. Bohannan was the first person in her family to attend college. She earned a Bachelor of Science degree in environmental engineering from the University of Florida in Gainesville. She later received a Juris Doctor from the University of Florida Levin College of Law.

== Career ==
Bohannan began her career as an environmental engineer with the Florida Department of Environmental Protection in the 1990s. She then attended law school and, after graduating, served as a law clerk for a federal judge on the United States Court of Appeals for the Eleventh Circuit.

In 2000, she moved to Iowa, where she became a professor of law at the University of Iowa College of Law. While teaching at the University of Iowa in Iowa City, Bohannan served as president of the faculty senate.

== Iowa House of Representatives ==
Bohannan announced her candidacy for the 85th district seat in the Iowa House of Representatives in October 2019. She defeated incumbent legislator Vicki Lensing by 32 percentage points in the Democratic primary and won the general election unopposed.

During her tenure, Bohannan helped advance bipartisan legislation addressing human trafficking and elder abuse, and opposed a proposed constitutional amendment declaring that the Iowa Constitution does not protect a right to abortion.

In the Iowa House, she served on the Natural Resources and Veterans Affairs committees and the Agriculture and Natural Resources Appropriations Subcommittee. She previously served on the Information Technology, Judiciary, and State Government committees.

== U.S. House of Representatives campaigns ==
Bohannan ran for the United States House of Representatives in Iowa's 1st congressional district in the 2022 election. She was the Democratic nominee but lost in the general election to incumbent Republican Mariannette Miller-Meeks. In August 2023, Bohannan announced another campaign for the same seat in the 2024 election but was unsuccessful after a close race with Miller-Meeks which was decided after a recount. She announced a third run for the seat in the 2026 election on June 17, 2025. She won the Democratic primary in June 2026, advancing to the November general election.

== Political positions ==
=== Healthcare ===
Bohannan has advocated for healthcare reform aimed at expanding access to affordable health insurance. She supports making a public Medicare buy-in available to Americans of any age and has called for extending enhanced subsidies under the Affordable Care Act, reversing federal Medicaid cuts, and expanding Medicare to include dental, hearing, and vision benefits. She has also supported allowing Medicare to negotiate lower prescription drug prices and extending the $35 monthly insulin cap to all Americans.

=== Institutional reform ===
Bohannan has advocated for ethics reforms for Congress, including term limits and age limits for members of Congress, banning congressional stock trading, and prohibiting members of Congress, their immediate families, and congressional staff from serving as lobbyists. She has also supported establishing an independent bipartisan agency to investigate congressional ethics violations.

== Personal life ==
Bohannan is married and has a daughter. She and her husband live in Iowa City.

== Electoral history ==
2026 Iowa's 1st congressional district election
| Party | Candidate | Votes | % |
|---|---|---|---|
| Democratic | Christina Bohannan | 182,396 | 52.8% |
| Republican | Mariannette Miller-Meeks (incumbent) | 150,471 | 43.6% |
| Independent | Michael Bridgford | 12,603 | 3.6% |
| Total votes | | | |
| Democratic gain from Republican | | | |

2024 Iowa's 1st congressional district election
| Party | Candidate | Votes | % |
|---|---|---|---|
| Republican | Mariannette Miller-Meeks (incumbent) | 206,955 | 49.98 |
| Democratic | Christina Bohannan | 206,157 | 49.79 |
| Write-in | | 967 | 0.23 |
| Total votes | | 414,078 | 100.0 |
| Republican hold | | | |

2022 Iowa's 1st congressional district election
| Party | Candidate | Votes | % |
|---|---|---|---|
| Republican | Mariannette Miller-Meeks (incumbent) | 162,947 | 53.3 |
| Democratic | Christina Bohannan | 142,173 | 46.6 |
| Write-in | | 260 | 0.1 |
| Total votes | | 305,380 | 100.0 |
| Republican hold | | | |

2020 Iowa House of Representatives election, district 85
| Party | Candidate | Votes | % |
|---|---|---|---|
| Democratic | Christina Bohannan | 4,438 | 66.0 |
| Democratic | Vicki Lensing (incumbent) | 2,288 | 34.0 |
| Total votes | | 6,729 | 100.0 |

U.S. House of Representatives
| Preceded by Mariannette Miller-Meeks | Member of the U.S. House of Representatives from Iowa's 1st congressional district Taking office 2027 | Elect |
