= Linda Langston =

American politician (born 1953)

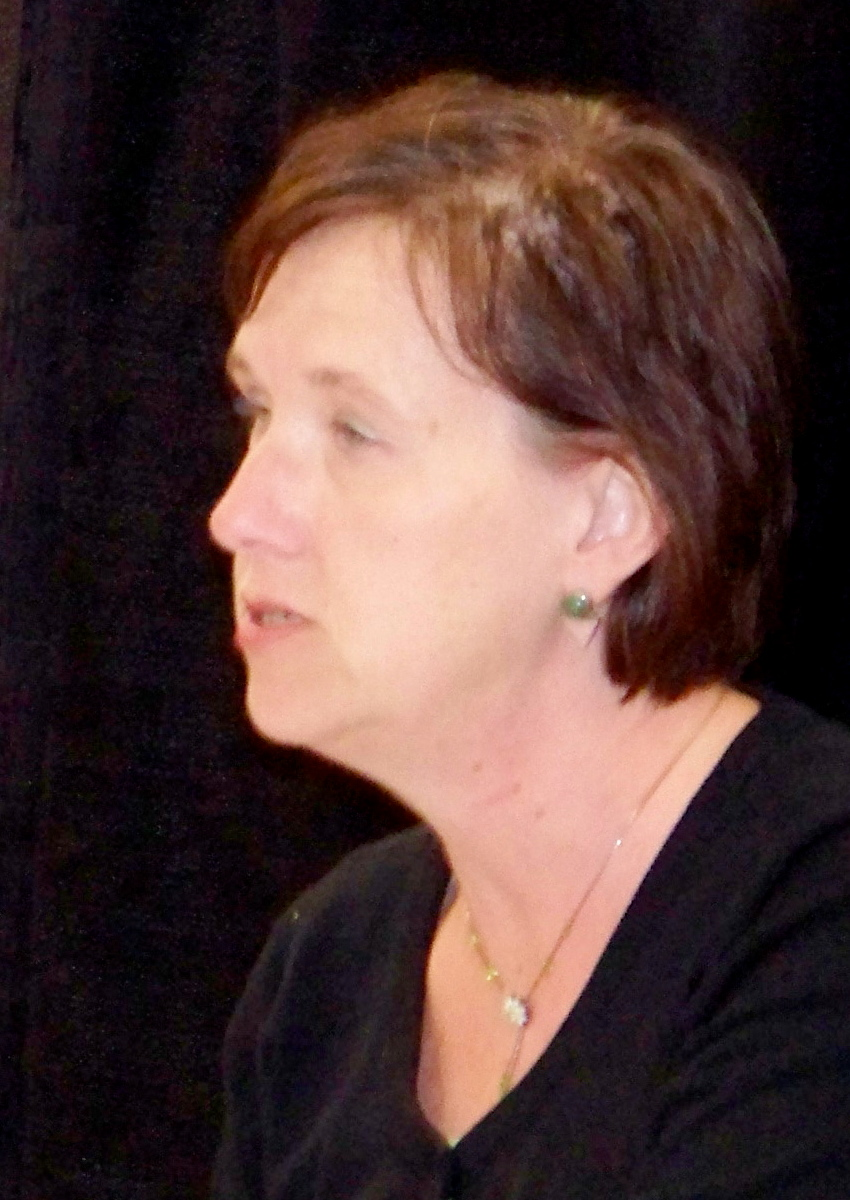
- Langston in 2007

Linn County Board of Supervisors
- Incumbent
- Assumed office 2002

Personal details
- Born: Linda Nelson; July 3, 1953 (age 73); Chicago, Illinois, U.S.
- Party: Democratic
- Spouse: David Langston (m. 1975)
- Children: Eric Langston, Evan Langston
- Education: Knox College
- Website: http://lindalangston.com/

Linda Langston is director of strategic relations for the National Association of Counties in Washington, D.C., US. Prior to that Langston was a member of the Linn County (Iowa) Board of Supervisors. She also serves as the co-chair of the Resilient America Roundtable for the National Academy of Sciences and is on the national advisory council for FEMA. She was elected in November 2002 and took office the following January. Prior to her public service, she was the executive director of the History Center in Cedar Rapids, Iowa, and the executive director of the Linn Mar School Foundation. While living in Chicago and Tulsa, she maintained a private practice in psychotherapy.

Langston speaks nationally on disaster recovery issues along with women's leadership issues.

== Early life, family, and career ==
Langston grew up on Chicago's south side in the Beverly neighborhood and graduated from Morgan Park High School. She then attended Knox College where she graduated in 1975 with a B.A. in history. Prior to running for office, she was the executive director and development director at the Linn County Historical Society.
