= 2020 United States Senate elections =

- November 3, 2020 (Note: Runoff elections were held in Georgia on January 5, 2021.)
- Class 2

35 (Note: 33 Class 2 seats, as well as 2 Class 3 seats in special election) of the 100 seats in the United States Senate 51 (Note: Majority control in an evenly divided Senate is determined by the vice president, who has the power to break tied votes in their constitutional capacity as president of the Senate. Accordingly, Senate control requires 51 seats without control of the vice presidency or 50 seats with control of the vice presidency.) seats needed for a majority
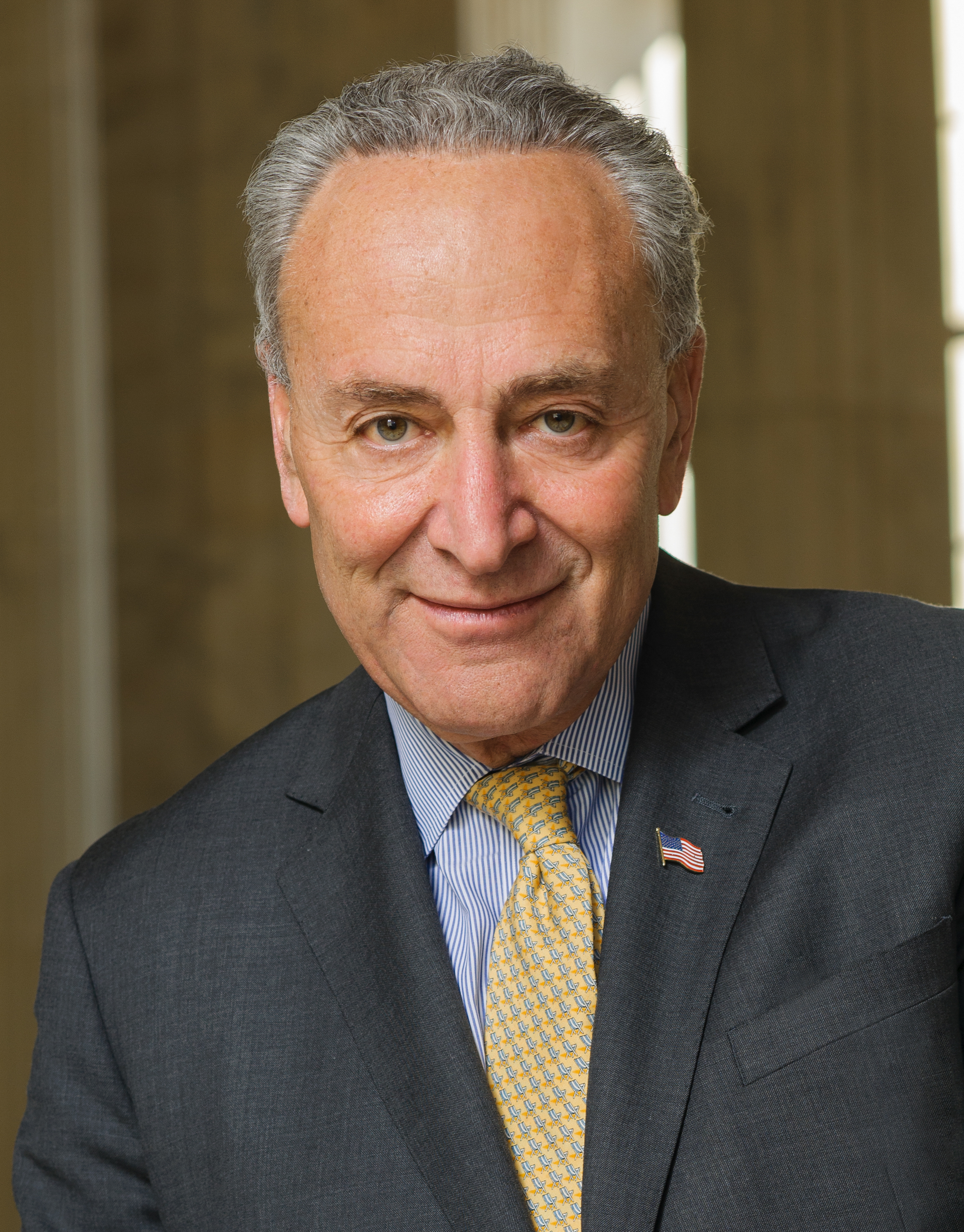

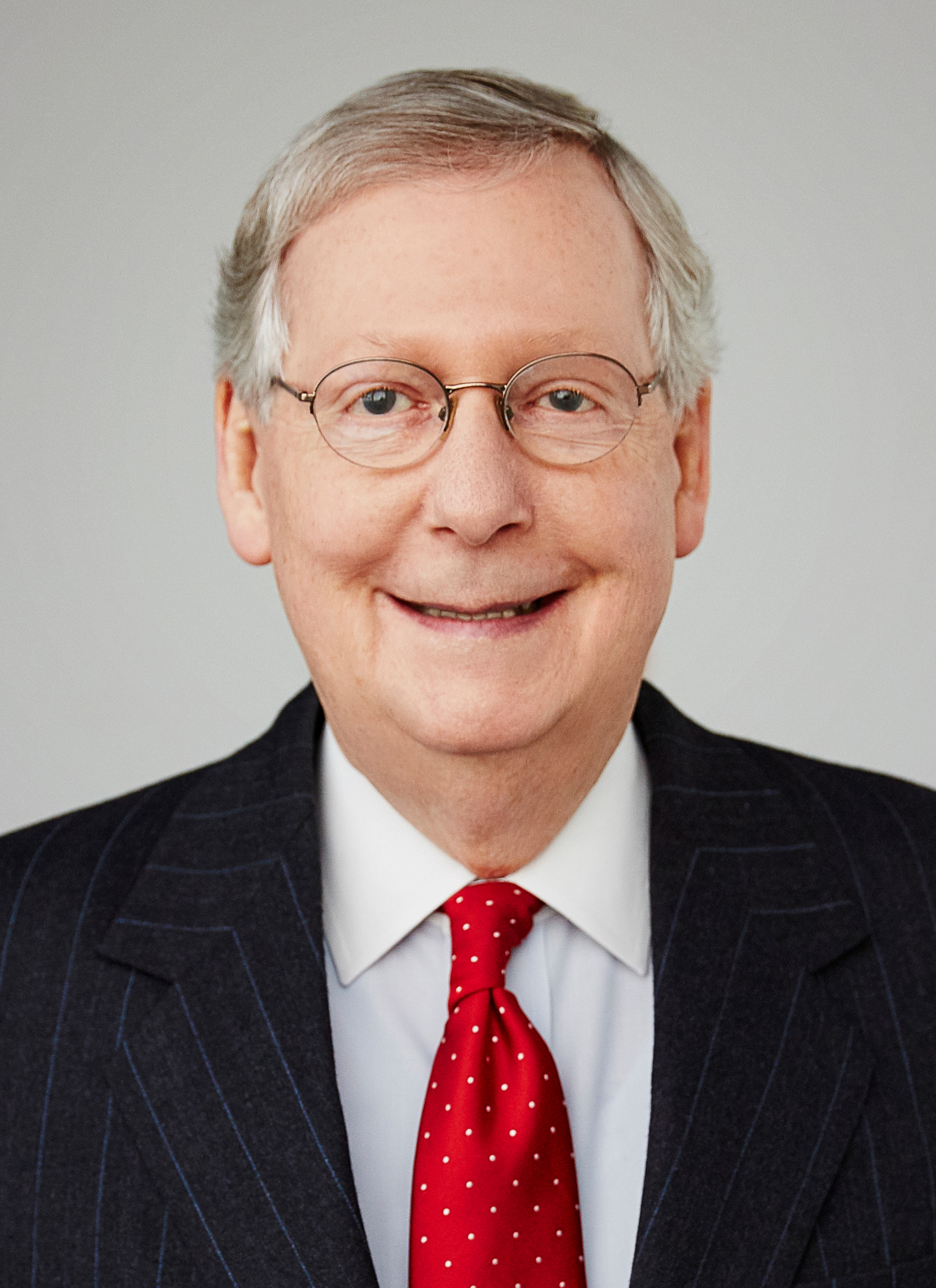
	Majority party	Minority party
Leader	Chuck Schumer	Mitch McConnell
Party	Democratic	Republican
Leader since	January 3, 2017	January 3, 2007
Leader's seat	New York	Kentucky
Seats before	45	53
Seats after	48 + VP (Note: The Democratic caucus, which also includes independent senators Angus King and Bernie Sanders, totaled 50 following these elections.) (Note: Although these elections yielded a 50–50 tie between the Democratic and Republican caucuses, Democrats took the majority due to their concurrent victory in the presidential election, with Vice President Kamala Harris empowered to act as tie-breaker.)	50
Seat change	▲3	▼3
Popular vote	38,011,916 (Note: For the two Georgia races, only the runoff results are counted.)	39,834,647
Percentage	47.03%	49.29%
Seats up	12	23
Races won	15	20
	Third party
Party	Independent
Seats before	2 (Note: Both independent senators — Angus King and Bernie Sanders — have caucused with the Democratic Party since joining the Senate.)
Seats after	2
Seat change	Steady
Popular vote	255,768 (Note: Total of official results for candidates labeled "independent".)
Percentage	0.32%
Seats up	0
Races won	0
- Results of the elections: Democratic gain Republican gain Democratic hold Republican hold No election Rectangular inset (Georgia): both seats up for election
Majority Leader before election
Mitch McConnell
Republican
Elected Majority Leader
Chuck Schumer (Note: McConnell briefly remained majority leader between January 3, when the 117th Congress was formally convened, and January 20, 2021, when Jon Ossoff and Raphael Warnock were sworn in as the 49th and 50th members of the Democratic caucus and Kamala Harris was inaugurated as vice president, thereby giving Democrats majority status in her capacity as tie-breaker.)
Democratic

The 2020 United States Senate elections were held on November 3, 2020, with the 33 class 2 seats of the Senate contested in regular elections. Of these, 21 were held by Republicans, and 12 by Democrats. The winners were elected to 6-year terms from January 3, 2021, to January 3, 2027. Two special elections for seats held by Republicans were also held in conjunction with the general elections: one in Arizona, to fill the vacancy created by John McCain's death in 2018; and one in Georgia, following Johnny Isakson's resignation in 2019. These elections ran concurrently with the 2020 United States presidential election in which incumbent president Donald Trump lost to Democratic nominee Joe Biden.

In the 2014 United States Senate elections, the last regularly scheduled elections for Class 2 Senate seats, the Republicans won nine seats from the Democrats and gained a majority, which they continued to hold after the 2016 and 2018 elections. Before the elections, Republicans held 53 seats, Democrats held 45 seats, and independents caucusing with the Democrats held two seats, neither of which were up for re-election. Including the special elections in Arizona and Georgia, Republicans defended 23 seats, and the Democrats defended 12.

In this election, the Democratic Party made a net gain of three Senate seats and the vice presidency, giving them a majority for the first time since 2014, albeit by a narrow 50–50 margin. Democrats unseated four Republicans in Arizona, Colorado, and both elections in Georgia – while Republicans flipped a seat in Alabama; however, Democrats under-performed expectations overall; despite record-breaking turnout and fund-raising efforts, they failed to flip several seats that were considered competitive, such as North Carolina, Iowa, and Maine, and lost many races by much larger margins than expected. Except in Maine, the winning party in every Senate election was the winning party in the state's presidential election.

Due to election laws in Georgia that require candidates to win at least 50% of the vote in the general election, the state's regularly scheduled and special Senate elections were decided in run-off elections on January 5, 2021. After the November general election, Republicans held 50 seats, while Democrats held 48 and the vice presidency, so sweeping both races was crucial for Democrats to attain a majority. They succeeded in doing so, and the partisan balance in the Senate became tied for the third time in history, after the results in the 1880 elections and the 2000 elections. Vice President Kamala Harris's tie-breaking vote gave Democrats control of the chamber by the smallest margin possible after the new administration took office. This is the last time Republicans won a senate seat in Maine.

This marked the first time since 1980 that either chamber of Congress flipped partisan control in a presidential election year, and the first time Democrats did so since 1948. This was the fourth presidential election cycle in a row, after 2008, 2012 and 2016, where Democrats made gains.

== Election summary ==
=== Seats ===
Parties				Total
Parties	Democratic	Independent	Republican	Total
Last elections (2018)	45	2	53	100
Before these elections	45	2	53	100
Not up	33	2	30	65
Class 1 (2018→2024)	21	2	10	33
Class 3 (2016→2022)	12	—	20	32
Up	12	—	23	35
Class 2 (2014→2020)	12	—	21	33
Special: Class 3	—	—	2	2
Regular elections
Incumbent retired	1	—	3	4
Held by same party	1	—	3	4
Replaced by other party	—	—	—	0
Result	1	—	3	4
Incumbent ran	11	—	18	29
Won re-election	10	—	16	26
Lost re-election	▼1 Democrat replaced by ▲1 Republican ▼2 Republicans replaced by ▲2 Democrats			3
Special elections
Appointee ran	—	—	2	2
Appointee elected	—	—	0	0
Result	▼2 Republicans replaced by ▲2 Democrats			2
Result	48	2	50	100

=== Votes ===
National results
Parties	Votes	%	Seats				
Parties	Votes	%	Total before	Up	Won	Total after	+/-
Republican	39,834,647	49.29	53	23	20	50	3
Democratic	38,011,916	47.03	45	12	15	48	3
Libertarian	1,454,128	1.80	0	0	0	0	
Green	258,348	0.32	0	0	0	0	
Constitution	110,851	0.14	0	0	0	0	
Independent	255,768	0.32	2	0	0	2	
Other parties	794,479	0.98	0	0	0	0	
Write-in	100,946	0.12	0	0	0	0	
Total	80,821,083	100.00	100	35	35	100	

== Change in composition ==
Republicans defended 23 seats, while Democrats defended 12. Each block represents one of the 100 Senate seats. "D#" is a Democratic senator, "I#" is an independent senator, and "R#" is a Republican senator. They are arranged so that the parties are separated, and a majority is clear by crossing the middle.

=== Before the elections ===
Each block indicates an incumbent senator's actions going into the election. Both Independents caucus with the Democrats.

D_{1}	D_{2}	D_{3}	D_{4}	D_{5}	D_{6}	D_{7}	D_{8}	D_{9}	D_{10}
D_{20}	D_{19}	D_{18}	D_{17}	D_{16}	D_{15}	D_{14}	D_{13}	D_{12}	D_{11}
D_{21}	D_{22}	D_{23}	D_{24}	D_{25}	D_{26}	D_{27}	D_{28}	D_{29}	D_{30}
D_{40} N.H. Ran	D_{39} Minn. Ran	D_{38} Mich. Ran	D_{37} Mass. Ran	D_{36} Ill. Ran	D_{35} Del. Ran	D_{34} Ala. Ran	D_{33}	D_{32}	D_{31}
D_{41} N.J. Ran	D_{42} Ore. Ran	D_{43} R.I. Ran	D_{44} Va. Ran	D_{45} N.M. Retired	I_{1}	I_{2}	R_{53} Wyo. Retired	R_{52} Tenn. Retired	R_{51} Kan. Retired
Majority →									R_{50} W.Va. Ran
R_{41} Maine; Ran	R_{42} Miss. Ran	R_{43} Mont. Ran	R_{44} Neb. Ran	R_{45} N.C. Ran	R_{46} Okla. Ran	R_{47} S.C. Ran	R_{48} S.D. Ran	R_{49} Texas; Ran	R_{50} W.Va. Ran
R_{40} La. Ran	R_{39} Ky. Ran	R_{38} Iowa; Ran	R_{37} Idaho; Ran	R_{36} Ga. (sp); Ran	R_{35} Ga. (reg); Ran	R_{34} Colo. Ran	R_{33} Ark. Ran	R_{32} Ariz. (sp); Ran	R_{31} Alaska; Ran
R_{21}	R_{22}	R_{23}	R_{24}	R_{25}	R_{26}	R_{27}	R_{28}	R_{29}	R_{30}
R_{20}	R_{19}	R_{18}	R_{17}	R_{16}	R_{15}	R_{14}	R_{13}	R_{12}	R_{11}
R_{1}	R_{2}	R_{3}	R_{4}	R_{5}	R_{6}	R_{7}	R_{8}	R_{9}	R_{10}

=== After the elections ===
After the January 5, 2021 runoff elections in Georgia.

D_{1}	D_{2}	D_{3}	D_{4}	D_{5}	D_{6}	D_{7}	D_{8}	D_{9}	D_{10}
D_{20}	D_{19}	D_{18}	D_{17}	D_{16}	D_{15}	D_{14}	D_{13}	D_{12}	D_{11}
D_{21}	D_{22}	D_{23}	D_{24}	D_{25}	D_{26}	D_{27}	D_{28}	D_{29}	D_{30}
D_{40} N.J. Re-elected	D_{39} N.H. Re-elected	D_{38} Minn. Re-elected	D_{37} Mich. Re-elected	D_{36} Mass. Re-elected	D_{35} Ill. Re-elected	D_{34} Del. Re-elected	D_{33}	D_{32}	D_{31}
D_{41} N.M. Hold	D_{42} Ore. Re-elected	D_{43} R.I. Re-elected	D_{44} Va. Re-elected	D_{45} Ariz. (sp); Gain (Note: Appointee defeated)	D_{46} Colo. Gain	D_{47} Ga. (reg). Gain	D_{48} Ga. (sp). Gain	I_{1}	I_{2}
Majority (with independents and vice president) ↑									I_{2}
R_{41} Neb. Re-elected	R_{42} N.C. Re-elected	R_{43} Okla. Re-elected	R_{44} S.C. Re-elected	R_{45} S.D. Re-elected	R_{46} Tenn. Hold	R_{47} Texas; Re-elected	R_{48} W.Va. Re-elected	R_{49} Wyo. Hold	R_{50} Ala. Gain
R_{40} Mont. Re-elected	R_{39} Miss. Re-elected	R_{38} Maine; Re-elected	R_{37} La. Re-elected	R_{36} Ky. Re-elected	R_{35} Kan. Hold	R_{34} Iowa; Re-elected	R_{33} Idaho; Re-elected	R_{32} Ark. Re-elected	R_{31} Alaska; Re-elected
R_{21}	R_{22}	R_{23}	R_{24}	R_{25}	R_{26}	R_{27}	R_{28}	R_{29}	R_{30}
R_{20}	R_{19}	R_{18}	R_{17}	R_{16}	R_{15}	R_{14}	R_{13}	R_{12}	R_{11}
R_{1}	R_{2}	R_{3}	R_{4}	R_{5}	R_{6}	R_{7}	R_{8}	R_{9}	R_{10}

Key:

D_{#}	Democratic
R_{#}	Republican
I_{#}	Independent, caucusing with Democrats

== Final pre-election predictions ==
Several sites and individuals published predictions of competitive seats. These predictions looked at factors such as the strength of the incumbent (if the incumbent was running for re-election) and the other candidates, and the state's partisan lean (reflected in part by the state's Cook Partisan Voting Index rating). The predictions assigned ratings to each seat, indicating the predicted advantage that a party had in winning that seat. Most election predictors used:

- "tossup": no advantage
- "tilt" (used by some predictors): advantage that is not quite as strong as "lean"
- "lean": slight advantage
- "likely": significant, but surmountable, advantage
- "safe" or "solid": near-certain chance of victory

Constituency		Incumbent		2020 election ratings									
State	PVI	Senator	Last election (Note: The last elections for this group of senators were in 2014, except for those elected in a special election or who were appointed after the resignation or passing of a sitting senator, as noted.)	Cook Oct 29, 2020	IE Oct 28, 2020	Sabato Nov 2, 2020	Daily Kos Nov 2, 2020	Politico Nov 2, 2020	RCP Oct 23, 2020	DDHQ Nov 3, 2020	538 (Note: FiveThirtyEight has three separate models for their House and Senate ratings: Lite (polling data only), Classic (polls, fundraising, and past voting patterns), and Deluxe (Classic alongside experts' ratings). This table uses the Deluxe model.) (Note: Category ranges: Tossup: <60% both candidates; Lean: ≥60%; Likely: ≥75%; Solid: ≥95%) Nov 3, 2020	Economist Nov 3, 2020	Result
Alabama	R+14	Doug Jones	50.0% D (2017 special) (Note: Republican Jeff Sessions ran uncontested in 2014 and won with 97.3% of the vote but resigned on February 8, 2017, to become United States Attorney General.)	Lean R (flip)	Lean R (flip)	Likely R (flip)	Likely R (flip)	Lean R (flip)	Likely R (flip)	Safe R (flip)	Likely R (flip)	Safe R (flip)	Tuberville (60.1%) (flip)
Alaska	R+9	Dan Sullivan	48.0% R	Lean R	Lean R	Lean R	Lean R	Lean R	Lean R	Lean R	Likely R	Lean R	Sullivan (54.3%)
Arizona (special)	R+5	Martha McSally	Appointed (2019) (Note: Republican John McCain won in 2016 with 53.7% of the vote but died on August 25, 2018.)	Lean D (flip)	Tilt D (flip)	Lean D (flip)	Lean D (flip)	Lean D (flip)	Tossup	Likely D (flip)	Likely D (flip)	Lean D (flip)	Kelly (51.2%) (flip)
Arkansas	R+15	Tom Cotton	56.5% R	Safe R	Safe R	Safe R	Safe R	Solid R	Safe R	Safe R	Solid R	Safe R	Cotton (66.6%)
Colorado	D+1	Cory Gardner	48.2% R	Lean D (flip)	Lean D (flip)	Likely D (flip)	Likely D (flip)	Lean D (flip)	Lean D (flip)	Likely D (flip)	Likely D (flip)	Likely D (flip)	Hickenlooper (53.5%) (flip)
Delaware	D+6	Chris Coons	55.8% D	Safe D	Safe D	Safe D	Safe D	Solid D	Safe D	Safe D	Solid D	Safe D	Coons (59.4%)
Georgia (regular)	R+5	David Perdue	52.9% R	Tossup	Tossup	Tossup	Tossup	Tossup	Tossup	Tossup	Tossup	Tossup	Ossoff (50.6%) (flip) (Note: This race was decided in a run-off on January 5, 2021, after no candidate reached 50% of the vote on November 3.)
Georgia (special)	R+5	Kelly Loeffler	Appointed (2020) (Note: Republican Johnny Isakson won with 54.8% of the vote in 2016 but resigned on December 31, 2019, due to declining health.)	Tossup	Tossup	Tossup	Tossup	Lean R	Lean R	Tossup	Lean D (flip)	Tossup	Warnock (51.0%) (flip)
Idaho	R+19	Jim Risch	65.3% R	Safe R	Safe R	Safe R	Safe R	Solid R	Safe R	Safe R	Solid R	Safe R	Risch (62.6%)
Illinois	D+7	Dick Durbin	53.5% D	Safe D	Safe D	Safe D	Safe D	Solid D	Safe D	Safe D	Solid D	Safe D	Durbin (54.6%)
Iowa	R+3	Joni Ernst	52.1% R	Tossup	Tossup	Lean R	Tossup	Tossup	Tossup	Tossup	Tossup	Tossup	Ernst (51.8%)
Kansas	R+13	Pat Roberts (retiring)	53.1% R	Lean R	Tilt R	Lean R	Lean R	Lean R	Lean R	Lean R	Likely R	Lean R	Marshall (53.5%)
Kentucky	R+15	Mitch McConnell	56.2% R	Likely R	Safe R	Likely R	Safe R	Likely R	Likely R	Safe R	Solid R	Likely R	McConnell (57.8%)
Louisiana	R+11	Bill Cassidy	55.9% R	Safe R	Safe R	Safe R	Safe R	Solid R	Safe R	Safe R	Solid R	Likely R	Cassidy (59.3%)
Maine	D+3	Susan Collins	68.5% R	Tossup	Tilt D (flip)	Lean D (flip)	Tossup	Tossup	Tossup	Lean D (flip)	Tossup	Lean D (flip)	Collins (51.0%)
Massachusetts	D+12	Ed Markey	61.9% D	Safe D	Safe D	Safe D	Safe D	Solid D	Safe D	Safe D	Solid D	Safe D	Markey (65.8%)
Michigan	D+1	Gary Peters	54.6% D	Lean D	Lean D	Lean D	Lean D	Lean D	Tossup	Likely D	Likely D	Likely D	Peters (49.9%)
Minnesota	D+1	Tina Smith	53.0% D (2018 special) (Note: Democrat Al Franken won with 53.2% of the vote in 2014 but resigned on January 2, 2018.)	Safe D	Safe D	Likely D	Likely D	Likely D	Tossup	Likely D	Solid D	Likely D	Smith (48.8%)
Mississippi	R+9	Cindy Hyde-Smith	53.6% R (2018 special) (Note: Republican Thad Cochran won with 59.9% of the vote in 2014 but resigned on April 1, 2018, due to declining health.)	Likely R	Safe R	Likely R	Safe R	Likely R	Lean R	Likely R	Likely R	Likely R	Hyde-Smith (55.3%)
Montana	R+11	Steve Daines	57.9% R	Tossup	Tossup	Lean R	Lean R	Tossup	Tossup	Lean R	Lean R	Lean R	Daines (55.0%)
Nebraska	R+14	Ben Sasse	64.5% R	Safe R	Safe R	Safe R	Safe R	Solid R	Safe R	Safe R	Solid R	Safe R	Sasse (64.7%)
New Hampshire	D+1	Jeanne Shaheen	51.5% D	Safe D	Safe D	Likely D	Safe D	Likely D	Lean D	Safe D	Solid D	Safe D	Shaheen (56.7%)
New Jersey	D+7	Cory Booker	55.8% D	Safe D	Safe D	Safe D	Safe D	Solid D	Likely D	Safe D	Solid D	Safe D	Booker (56.9%)
New Mexico	D+3	Tom Udall (retiring)	55.6% D	Safe D	Safe D	Likely D	Safe D	Likely D	Lean D	Safe D	Likely D	Likely D	Luján (51.7%)
North Carolina	R+3	Thom Tillis	48.8% R	Tossup	Tilt D (flip)	Lean D (flip)	Tossup	Tossup	Tossup	Lean D (flip)	Lean D (flip)	Lean D (flip)	Tillis (48.7%)
Oklahoma	R+20	Jim Inhofe	68.0% R	Safe R	Safe R	Safe R	Safe R	Solid R	Safe R	Safe R	Solid R	Safe R	Inhofe (62.9%)
Oregon	D+5	Jeff Merkley	55.7% D	Safe D	Safe D	Safe D	Safe D	Solid D	Safe D	Safe D	Solid D	Safe D	Merkley (57.0%)
Rhode Island	D+10	Jack Reed	70.6% D	Safe D	Safe D	Safe D	Safe D	Solid D	Safe D	Safe D	Solid D	Safe D	Reed (66.5%)
South Carolina	R+8	Lindsey Graham	55.3% R	Tossup	Tilt R	Lean R	Lean R	Lean R	Tossup	Lean R	Likely R	Lean R	Graham (54.5%)
South Dakota	R+14	Mike Rounds	50.4% R	Safe R	Safe R	Safe R	Safe R	Solid R	Safe R	Safe R	Solid R	Safe R	Rounds (65.7%)
Tennessee	R+14	Lamar Alexander (retiring)	61.9% R	Safe R	Safe R	Safe R	Safe R	Solid R	Likely R	Safe R	Solid R	Safe R	Hagerty (62.1%)
Texas	R+8	John Cornyn	61.6% R	Lean R	Lean R	Lean R	Lean R	Lean R	Lean R	Likely R	Likely R	Lean R	Cornyn (53.6%)
Virginia	D+1	Mark Warner	49.1% D	Safe D	Safe D	Safe D	Safe D	Solid D	Likely D	Safe D	Solid D	Safe D	Warner (56.0%)
West Virginia	R+19	Shelley Moore Capito	62.1% R	Safe R	Safe R	Safe R	Safe R	Solid R	Safe R	Safe R	Solid R	Safe R	Capito (70.3%)
Wyoming	R+25	Mike Enzi (retiring)	72.2% R	Safe R	Safe R	Safe R	Safe R	Solid R	Safe R	Safe R	Solid R	Safe R	Lummis (73.1%)
Overall (Note: Democratic total includes two tndependents who caucus with the Democrats.)				D – 48; R – 45; 7 tossups	D – 50 (Note: The predictor puts the Vice President for the Democrats, giving them control of the Senate in their ratings with only 50 seats.); R – 47; 3 tossups	D – 50; R – 48; 2 tossups	D – 48; R – 47; 5 tossups	D – 48; R – 47; 5 tossups	D – 45; R – 46; 9 tossups	D – 50; R – 47; 3 tossups	D – 50; R – 47; 3 tossups	D – 50; R – 47; 3 tossups	Results: D – 50; R – 50

== Election dates ==
State	Filing deadline for major party candidates	Filing deadline for write-in candidates in major party primaries (Note: If no filing is required prior to the primary, the primary's date is listed.)	Primary election	Primary run-off (if necessary)	Filing deadline for minor party and unaffiliated candidates	Filing deadline for minor party and unaffiliated write-in candidates (Note: If no filing is required prior to the general election, the election's date is listed.)	General election	Poll closing (EST)
Alabama	November 8, 2019	Ineligible	March 3, 2020	July 14, 2020	March 3, 2020	November 3, 2020	November 3, 2020	8:00pm
Alaska	June 1, 2020	Ineligible	August 18, 2020	N/A	August 18, 2020	October 29, 2020	November 3, 2020	1:00am (Note: The following morning.)
Arizona (special)	April 6, 2020	June 25, 2020	August 4, 2020	N/A	April 6, 2020	September 24, 2020	November 3, 2020	9:00pm
Arkansas	November 11, 2019	Ineligible	March 3, 2020	Not necessary	May 1, 2020	August 5, 2020	November 3, 2020	8:30pm
Colorado	March 17, 2020	April 24, 2020	June 30, 2020	N/A	July 9, 2020	July 16, 2020	November 3, 2020	9:00pm
Delaware	July 14, 2020	Ineligible	September 15, 2020	N/A	September 1, 2020	September 20, 2020	November 3, 2020	8:00pm
Georgia (regular)	March 6, 2020	Ineligible	June 9, 2020	Not necessary	August 14, 2020	September 7, 2020	November 3, 2020 (Note: If no candidate wins a majority of the vote in the general election on November 3, 2020, the top two candidates will go to run-off on January 5, 2021.)	7:00pm
Georgia (special)	March 6, 2020	Ineligible	November 3, 2020	N/A	August 14, 2020	September 7, 2020	January 5, 2021 (Note: If no candidate wins a majority of the vote in the "jungle primary" on November 3, 2020, the top two candidates will go to run-off.)	9:00pm
Idaho	March 13, 2020	May 5, 2020	June 2, 2020	N/A	March 13, 2020	October 6, 2020	November 3, 2020	10:00pm
Illinois	December 2, 2019	January 2, 2020	March 17, 2020	N/A	July 20, 2020	September 3, 2020	November 3, 2020	8:00pm
Iowa	March 13, 2020	June 2, 2020	June 2, 2020	Not necessary	March 13, 2020	November 3, 2020	November 3, 2020	10:00pm
Kansas	June 1, 2020	Not necessary (Note: Eligible up to August 4, 2020, only if no non-write-in candidates file for a primary.)	August 4, 2020	N/A	August 3, 2020	November 3, 2020	November 3, 2020	9:00pm
Kentucky	January 10, 2020	Ineligible	June 23, 2020	N/A	June 2, 2020	October 23, 2020	November 3, 2020	7:00pm
Louisiana	July 24, 2020	Ineligible	November 3, 2020	N/A	July 24, 2020	Ineligible	Not necessary	9:00pm
Maine	March 16, 2020	April 10, 2020	July 14, 2020	N/A	June 1, 2020	September 4, 2020	November 3, 2020	8:00pm
Massachusetts	May 5, 2020	September 1, 2020	September 1, 2020	N/A	August 25, 2020	November 3, 2020	November 3, 2020	8:00pm
Michigan	May 8, 2020	July 24, 2020	August 4, 2020	N/A	August 4, 2020	October 23, 2020	November 3, 2020	8:00pm
Minnesota	June 2, 2020	May 19, 2020	August 11, 2020	N/A	June 2, 2020	October 27, 2020	November 3, 2020	9:00pm
Mississippi	January 10, 2020	Not necessary (Note: Eligible up to March 10, 2020, only if a candidate whose name is still on the ballot has died, resigned or withdrawn from the race.)	March 10, 2020	Not necessary	January 10, 2020	November 3, 2020 (Note: Eligible up to November 3, 2020, only if a candidate whose name is still on the ballot ha died, resigned or withdrawn from the race.)	November 3, 2020	8:00pm
Montana	March 9, 2020	April 8, 2020	June 2, 2020	N/A	June 1, 2020	September 9, 2020	November 3, 2020	10:00pm
Nebraska	March 2, 2020	May 1, 2020	May 12, 2020	N/A	August 3, 2020	October 23, 2020	November 3, 2020	9:00pm
New Hampshire	June 12, 2020	September 8, 2020	September 8, 2020	N/A	September 2, 2020	November 3, 2020	November 3, 2020	8:00pm
New Jersey	March 30, 2020	July 7, 2020	July 7, 2020	N/A	July 7, 2020	November 3, 2020	November 3, 2020	8:00pm
New Mexico	March 10, 2020	March 17, 2020	June 2, 2020	N/A	June 25, 2020	June 26, 2020	November 3, 2020	9:00pm
North Carolina	December 20, 2019	Ineligible	March 3, 2020	Not necessary	March 3, 2020	July 21, 2020	November 3, 2020	7:30pm
Oklahoma	April 10, 2020	Ineligible	June 30, 2020	Not necessary	April 10, 2020	Ineligible	November 3, 2020	8:00pm
Oregon	March 10, 2020	May 19, 2020	May 19, 2020	N/A	August 25, 2020	November 3, 2020	November 3, 2020	10:00pm
Rhode Island	June 24, 2020	September 8, 2020	September 8, 2020	N/A	June 24, 2020	November 3, 2020	November 3, 2020	8:00pm
South Carolina	March 30, 2020	Ineligible	June 9, 2020	Not necessary	July 20, 2020	November 3, 2020	November 3, 2020	7:00pm
South Dakota	March 31, 2020	Ineligible	June 2, 2020	Not necessary	April 28, 2020	Ineligible	November 3, 2020	8:00pm
Tennessee	April 2, 2020	June 17, 2020	August 6, 2020	N/A	April 2, 2020	September 14, 2020	November 3, 2020	8:00pm
Texas	December 9, 2019	Ineligible	March 3, 2020	July 14, 2020	August 13, 2020 (Note: Initial declaration of intent's deadline for unaffiliated candidates is December 9, 2019.)	August 17, 2020	November 3, 2020	8:00pm
Virginia	March 26, 2020	Ineligible	June 23, 2020	N/A	June 23, 2020	November 3, 2020	November 3, 2020	7:00pm
West Virginia	January 25, 2020	Ineligible	June 9, 2020	N/A	July 31, 2020	September 15, 2020	November 3, 2020	7:30pm
Wyoming	May 29, 2020	August 18, 2020 (Note: Write-in candidates must be registered members of a party by this date to be nominated in its primary but do not need to file a declaration of candidacy beforehand.)	August 18, 2020	N/A	August 25, 2020	November 3, 2020	November 3, 2020	9:00pm

== Gains, losses and holds ==
=== Retirements ===
Map of retirements: Republican incumbent Democratic incumbent Republican incumbent retiring Democratic incumbent retiring

One Democrat and three Republicans retired instead of seeking re-election.

State	Senator	Age at end of term	Assumed office	Replaced by	Ref
Kansas	Pat Roberts	84	1997	Roger Marshall	
New Mexico	Tom Udall	72	2009	Ben Ray Luján	
Tennessee	Lamar Alexander	80	2003	Bill Hagerty	
Wyoming	Mike Enzi	76	1997	Cynthia Lummis	

=== Defeats ===
One Democrat and four Republicans sought re-election but lost in the general election, including two interim appointees who also sought elections to finish the terms.

State	Senator	Age at end of term	Assumed office	Replaced by
Alabama	Doug Jones	66	2018 (Note: Elected in the 2017 special election to finish Jeff Sessions's term.)	Tommy Tuberville
Arizona (special)	Martha McSally	54	2019 (Note: Appointed to the seat following the resignation of Jon Kyl, who was himself appointed following the death of John McCain.)	Mark Kelly
Colorado	Cory Gardner	46	2015	John Hickenlooper
Georgia (regular)	David Perdue	71	2015	Jon Ossoff
Georgia (special)	Kelly Loeffler	50	2020 (Note: Appointed to the seat following the resignation of Johnny Isakson.)	Raphael Warnock

=== Post-election changes ===
One Democrat resigned shortly after the start of the 117th Congress and was replaced by a Democratic appointee. In California, a regular scheduled election was held in the 2022 Senate elections for the Class 3 terms, where Democrat appointee Alex Padilla won the election.

State	Senator	Replaced by
California (Class 3)	Kamala Harris	Alex Padilla

== Race summary ==
=== Special elections during the preceding Congress ===
In each special election, the winner's term begins immediately after their election is certified by their state's government.

Elections are sorted by date then state.

State	Incumbent			Results	Candidates
State	Senator	Party	Electoral history	Results	Candidates
Arizona (Class 3)	Martha McSally	Republican	2019 (appointed)	Interim appointee lost election. New senator elected November 3, 2020 and seated December 2, 2020. Democratic gain.	▌ ✓ Mark Kelly (Democratic) 51.2%; ▌Martha McSally (Republican) 48.8%
Georgia (Class 3)	Kelly Loeffler	Republican	2020 (appointed)	Interim appointee lost election in runoff. New senator elected January 5, 2021. Democratic gain. Winner delayed term until January 20, 2021, to the start of Biden administration.	▌ ✓ Raphael Warnock (Democratic) 51.0%; ▌Kelly Loeffler (Republican) 49.0%

=== Elections leading to the next Congress ===
In each general election, the winner is elected for the term beginning January 3, 2021.

State	Incumbent			Results	Candidates
State	Senator	Party	Electoral history	Results	Candidates
Alabama	Doug Jones	Democratic	2017 (special)	Incumbent lost re-election. Republican gain.	▌ ✓ Tommy Tuberville (Republican) 60.1%; ▌Doug Jones (Democratic) 39.7%
Alaska	Dan Sullivan	Republican	2014	Incumbent re-elected.	▌ ✓ Dan Sullivan (Republican) 53.9%; ▌Al Gross (Independent) 41.2%; ▌John Wayne Howe (AKIP) 4.7%
Arkansas	Tom Cotton	Republican	2014	Incumbent re-elected.	▌ ✓ Tom Cotton (Republican) 66.5%; ▌Ricky Dale Harrington Jr. (Libertarian) 33.5%
Colorado	Cory Gardner	Republican	2014	Incumbent lost re-election. Democratic gain.	▌ ✓ John Hickenlooper (Democratic) 53.5%; ▌Cory Gardner (Republican) 44.2%; Others: ▌Raymon Doane (Libertarian) 1.7%; ▌Daniel Doyle (Approval Voting) 0.3%; ▌Stephan "Seku" Evans (Unity) 0.3%
Delaware	Chris Coons	Democratic	2010 (special); 2014	Incumbent re-elected.	▌ ✓ Chris Coons (Democratic) 59.4%; ▌Lauren Witzke (Republican) 37.9%; ▌Mark Turley (IPOD) 1.6%; ▌Nadine Frost (Libertarian) 1.1%
Georgia	David Perdue	Republican	2014	Incumbent term expired but lost re-election in runoff. Democratic gain. Winner delayed term until January 20, 2021, to the start of Biden administration.	First round: ▌ David Perdue (Republican) 49.7%; ▌ Jon Ossoff (Democratic) 47.9%; ▌Shane Hazel (Libertarian) 0.4%; Runoff: ▌ ✓ Jon Ossoff (Democratic) 50.6%; ▌David Perdue (Republican) 49.4%
Idaho	Jim Risch	Republican	2008; 2014	Incumbent re-elected.	▌ ✓ Jim Risch (Republican) 62.6%; ▌Paulette Jordan (Democratic) 33.3%; ▌Natalie Fleming (Independent) 2.9%; ▌Ray Writz (Constitution) 1.2%
Illinois	Dick Durbin	Democratic	1996; 2002; 2008; 2014	Incumbent re-elected.	▌ ✓ Dick Durbin (Democratic) 54.9%; ▌Mark Curran (Republican) 38.9%; ▌Willie Wilson (Willie Wilson Party) 4%; ▌Danny Malouf (Libertarian) 1.3%; ▌David F. Black (Green) 0.9%
Iowa	Joni Ernst	Republican	2014	Incumbent re-elected.	▌ ✓ Joni Ernst (Republican) 51.8%; ▌Theresa Greenfield (Democratic) 45.2%; ▌Rick Stewart (Libertarian) 2.2%; ▌Suzanne Herzog (Independent) 0.8%
Kansas	Pat Roberts	Republican	1996; 2002; 2008; 2014	Incumbent retired. Republican hold.	▌ ✓ Roger Marshall (Republican) 53.2%; ▌Barbara Bollier (Democratic) 41.8%; ▌Jason Buckley (Libertarian) 5.0%
Kentucky	Mitch McConnell	Republican	1984; 1990; 1996; 2002; 2008; 2014	Incumbent re-elected.	▌ ✓ Mitch McConnell (Republican) 57.8%; ▌Amy McGrath (Democratic) 38.2%; ▌Brad Barron (Libertarian) 4.0%
Louisiana	Bill Cassidy	Republican	2014	Incumbent re-elected.	▌ ✓ Bill Cassidy (Republican) 59.3%; ▌Adrian Perkins (Democratic) 19.0%; ▌Champ Edwards (Democratic) 11.1%; ▌Antoine Pierce (Democratic) 2.7%; Others: ▌Dustin Murphy (Republican) 1.9%; ▌Drew David Knight (Democratic) 1.8%; ▌Beryl Billiot (Independent) 0.8%; ▌John Paul Bourgeois (Independent) 0.8%; ▌Peter Wenstrup (Democratic) 0.7%; ▌Aaron Sigler (Libertarian) 0.5%; ▌Vinny Mendoza (Independent) 0.4%; ▌Melinda Mary Price (Independent) 0.4%; ▌Jamar Montgomery (Independent) 0.3%; ▌Reno Daret III (Independent) 0.2%; ▌Xan John (Independent) 0.1%
Maine	Susan Collins	Republican	1996; 2002; 2008; 2014	Incumbent re-elected.	▌ ✓ Susan Collins (Republican) 51%; ▌Sara Gideon (Democratic) 42.4%; ▌Lisa Savage (Independent) 5.0%; ▌Max Linn (Independent) 1.6%
Massachusetts	Ed Markey	Democratic	2013 (special); 2014	Incumbent re-elected.	▌ ✓ Ed Markey (Democratic) 66.2%; ▌Kevin O'Connor (Republican) 33.0%; Write-ins 0.8%
Michigan	Gary Peters	Democratic	2014	Incumbent re-elected.	▌ ✓ Gary Peters (Democratic) 49.9%; ▌John James (Republican) 48.2%; Others: ▌Valerie Willis (U.S. Taxpayers) 0.9%; ▌Marcia Squier (Green) 0.7%; ▌Doug Dern (Natural Law) 0.2%
Minnesota	Tina Smith	DFL	2018 (appointed); 2018 (special)	Incumbent re-elected.	▌ ✓ Tina Smith (DFL) 48.8%; ▌Jason Lewis (Republican) 43.5%; ▌Kevin O'Connor (Legal Marijuana Now) 5.9%; ▌Oliver Steinberg (Legalize Cannabis) 1.8%
Mississippi	Cindy Hyde-Smith	Republican	2018 (appointed); 2018 (special)	Incumbent re-elected.	▌ ✓ Cindy Hyde-Smith (Republican) 54.1%; ▌Mike Espy (Democratic) 44.1%; ▌Jimmy Edwards (Libertarian) 1.8%; Write-ins 0.1%
Montana	Steve Daines	Republican	2014	Incumbent re-elected.	▌ ✓ Steve Daines (Republican) 55%; ▌Steve Bullock (Democratic) 45%
Nebraska	Ben Sasse	Republican	2014	Incumbent re-elected.	▌ ✓ Ben Sasse (Republican) 62.7%; ▌Chris Janicek (Democratic) 24.4%; ▌Preston Love Jr. (Democratic) (write-in) 6.3%; ▌Gene Siadek (Libertarian) 5.0%
New Hampshire	Jeanne Shaheen	Democratic	2008; 2014	Incumbent re-elected.	▌ ✓ Jeanne Shaheen (Democratic) 56.7%; ▌Corky Messner (Republican) 41.0%; ▌Justin O'Donnell (Libertarian) 2.3%
New Jersey	Cory Booker	Democratic	2013 (special); 2014	Incumbent re-elected.	▌ ✓ Cory Booker (Democratic) 57.2%; ▌Rik Mehta (Republican) 40.9%; Others: ▌Madelyn R. Hoffman (Green) 0.9%; ▌Veronica Fernandez (Of, By, For!) 0.7%; ▌Daniel Burke (LaRouche was Right) 0.3%
New Mexico	Tom Udall	Democratic	2008; 2014	Incumbent retired. Democratic hold.	▌ ✓ Ben Ray Luján (Democratic) 51.7%; ▌Mark Ronchetti (Republican) 45.6%; ▌Bob Walsh (Libertarian) 2.6%
North Carolina	Thom Tillis	Republican	2014	Incumbent re-elected.	▌ ✓ Thom Tillis (Republican) 48.7%; ▌Cal Cunningham (Democratic) 46.9%; ▌Shannon Bray (Libertarian) 3.1%; ▌Kevin Hayes (Constitution) 1.2%
Oklahoma	Jim Inhofe	Republican	1994 (special); 1996; 2002; 2008; 2014	Incumbent re-elected.	▌ ✓ Jim Inhofe (Republican) 62.9%; ▌Abby Broyles (Democratic) 32.8%; Others: ▌Robert Murphy (Libertarian) 2.2%; ▌Joan Farr (Independent) 1.4%; ▌A. D. Nesbit (Independent) 0.7%
Oregon	Jeff Merkley	Democratic	2008; 2014	Incumbent re-elected.	▌ ✓ Jeff Merkley (Democratic) 56.9%; ▌Jo Rae Perkins (Republican) 39.3%; Others: ▌Gary Dye (Libertarian) 1.8%; ▌Ibrahim Taher (Pacific Green) 1.8%; Write-ins 0.1%
Rhode Island	Jack Reed	Democratic	1996; 2002; 2008; 2014	Incumbent re-elected.	▌ ✓ Jack Reed (Democratic) 66.6%; ▌Allen Waters (Republican) 33.4%
South Carolina	Lindsey Graham	Republican	2002; 2008; 2014	Incumbent re-elected.	▌ ✓ Lindsey Graham (Republican) 54.5%; ▌Jaime Harrison (Democratic) 44.2%; ▌Bill Bledsoe (Constitution) 1.3%
South Dakota	Mike Rounds	Republican	2014	Incumbent re-elected.	▌ ✓ Mike Rounds (Republican) 65.7%; ▌Dan Ahlers (Democratic) 34.3%
Tennessee	Lamar Alexander	Republican	2002; 2008; 2014	Incumbent retired. Republican hold.	▌ ✓ Bill Hagerty (Republican) 62.2%; ▌Marquita Bradshaw (Democratic) 35.2%; Others: ▌Elizabeth McLeod (Independent) 0.6%; ▌Yomi Faparusi (Independent) 0.4%; ▌Steven Hooper (Independent) 0.3%; ▌Kacey Morgan (Independent) 0.3%; ▌Ronnie Henley (Independent) 0.3%; ▌Aaron James (Independent) 0.2%; ▌Eric Stansberry (Independent) 0.2%; ▌Dean Hill (Independent) 0.2%; ▌Jeffrey Grunau (Independent) 0.1%
Texas	John Cornyn	Republican	2002; 2002 (appointed); 2008; 2014	Incumbent re-elected.	▌ ✓ John Cornyn (Republican) 53.5%; ▌MJ Hegar (Democratic) 43.9%; ▌Kerry McKennon (Libertarian) 1.9%; ▌David B. Collins (Green) 0.7%
Virginia	Mark Warner	Democratic	2008; 2014	Incumbent re-elected.	▌ ✓ Mark Warner (Democratic) 56%; ▌Daniel Gade (Republican) 43.9%
West Virginia	Shelley Moore Capito	Republican	2014	Incumbent re-elected.	▌ ✓ Shelley Moore Capito (Republican) 70.3%; ▌Paula Jean Swearengin (Democratic) 27%; ▌David Moran (Libertarian) 2.7%
Wyoming	Mike Enzi	Republican	1996; 2002; 2008; 2014	Incumbent retired. Republican hold.	▌ ✓ Cynthia Lummis (Republican) 73.1%; ▌Merav Ben-David (Democratic) 26.9%

== Closest races ==
12 races had a margin of victory under 10%:

State	Party of winner	Margin
Georgia (regular)	Democratic (flip)	1.23% (Note: Georgia was the "tipping-point state".)
Michigan	Democratic	1.68%
North Carolina	Republican	1.75%
Georgia (special)	Democratic (flip)	2.08%
Arizona (special)	Democratic (flip)	2.35%
Minnesota	Democratic	5.24%
New Mexico	Democratic	6.11%
Iowa	Republican	6.59%
Maine	Republican	8.59%
Colorado	Democratic (flip)	9.32%
Texas	Republican	9.64%
Mississippi	Republican	9.97%

== Alabama ==
Alabama election
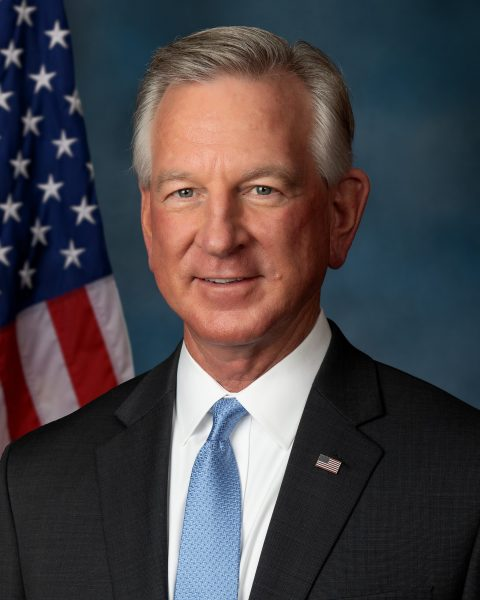

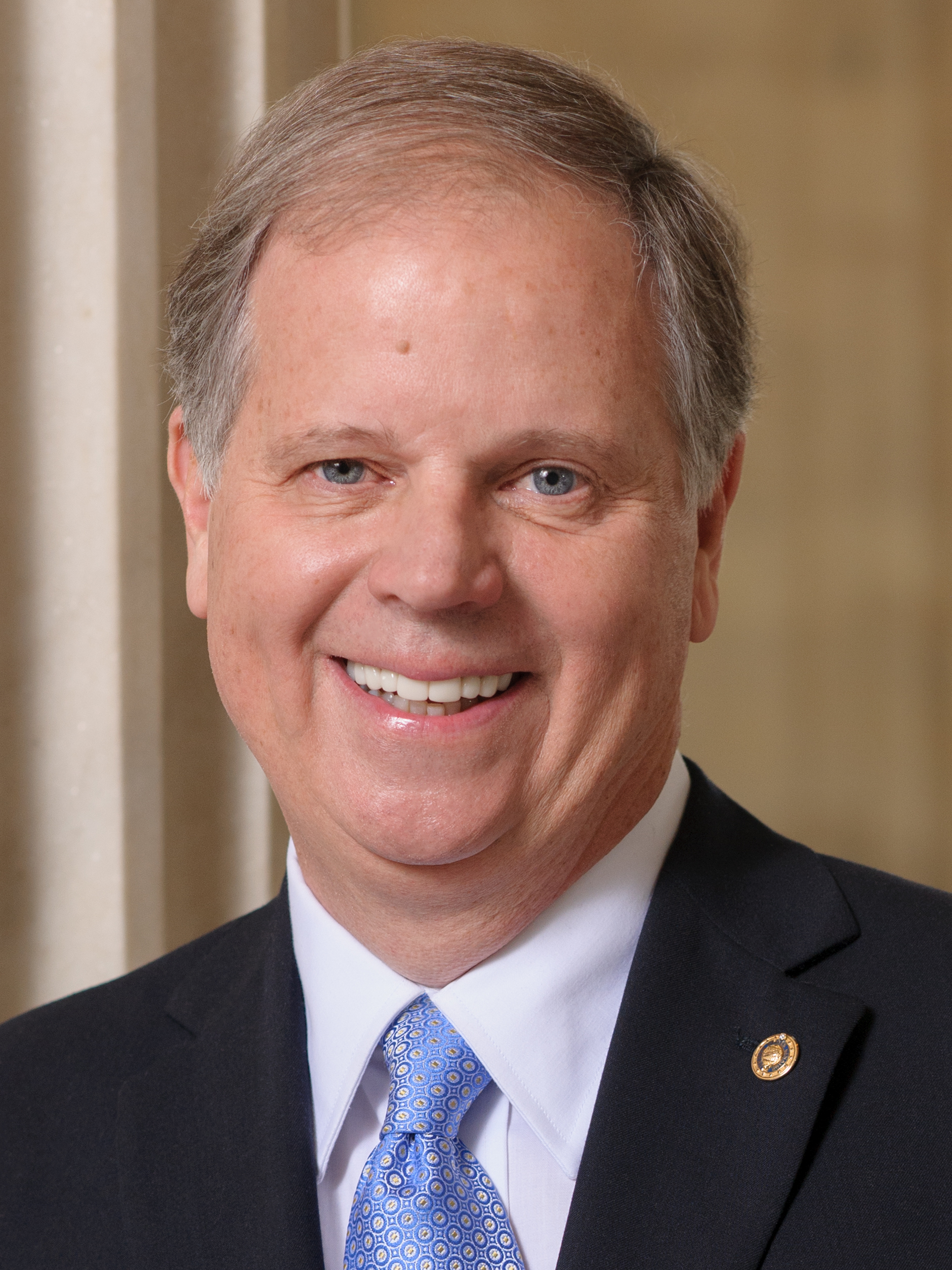
Nominee	Tommy Tuberville	Doug Jones
Party	Republican	Democratic
Popular vote	1,392,076	920,478
Percentage	60.1%	39.7%
- Tuberville: 50–60% 60–70% 70–80% 80-90% Jones: 50–60% 60–70% 70–80% 80–90%
U.S. senator before election
Doug Jones
Democratic
Elected U.S. senator
Tommy Tuberville
Republican

Incumbent Democrat Doug Jones was elected in a special election in 2017, narrowly defeating Republican nominee Roy Moore. He ran for a full term in 2020, losing to Republican Tommy Tuberville in a landslide.

Tuberville is a former football head coach for Auburn University. He defeated former senator and attorney general Jeff Sessions in a July 14 run-off to secure the Republican nomination, after securing President Donald Trump's endorsement. Sessions occupied the seat until 2017 when he resigned to become attorney general in the Trump administration.

Alabama is one of the country's most Republican states, and Jones's win was in part due to sexual assault allegations against nominee Roy Moore during the special election; most analysts expected the seat to flip back to GOP control. Tuberville defeated Jones by more than 20 percentage points.

Alabama Republican primary
Party	Candidate	Votes	%
Republican	Tommy Tuberville	239,616	33.39
Republican	Jeff Sessions	227,088	31.64
Republican	Bradley Byrne	178,627	24.89
Republican	Roy Moore	51,377	7.16
Republican	Ruth Page Nelson	7,200	1.00
Republican	Arnold Mooney	7,149	1.00
Republican	Stanley Adair	6,608	0.92
Total votes		717,665	100.00

Alabama Republican primary runoff
Party	Candidate	Votes	%
Republican	Tommy Tuberville	334,675	60.73
Republican	Jeff Sessions	216,452	39.27
Total votes		551,127	100.00

Alabama general election
Party	Candidate	Votes	%	±%
Republican	Tommy Tuberville	1,392,076	60.10%	+11.76
Democratic	Doug Jones (incumbent)	920,478	39.74%	–10.23
Write-in		3,891	0.17%	–1.52
Total votes		2,316,445	100.00%	
Republican gain from Democratic				

== Alaska ==
Alaska election
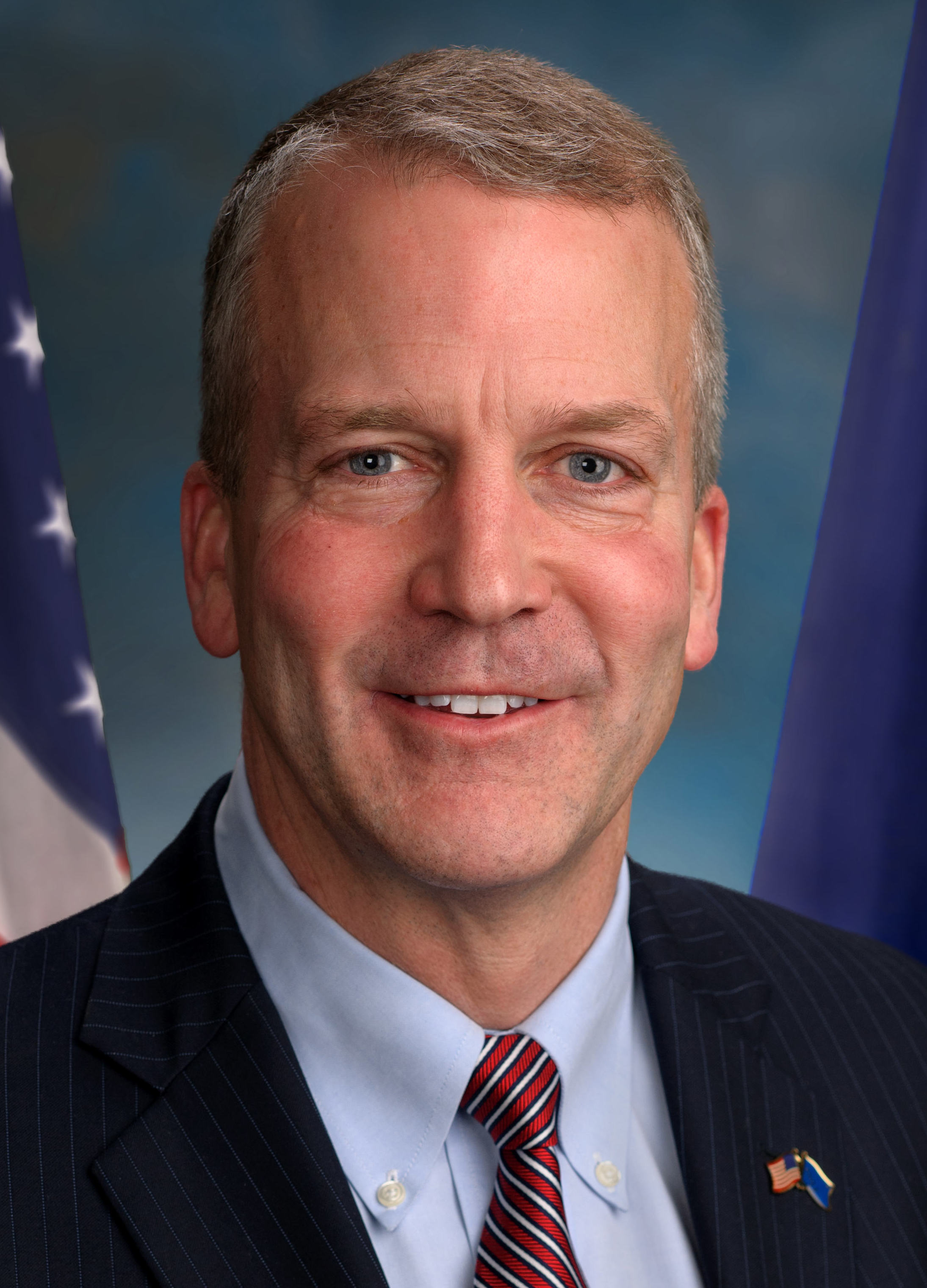

Nominee	Dan Sullivan	Al Gross (Note: Gross ran as an independent with the nomination of the Democratic Party.)
Party	Republican	Independent
Popular vote	191,112	146,068
Percentage	53.90%	41.19%
- Borough and census area results Sullivan: 40–50% 50–60% 60–70% 70–80% Gross: 40–50% 50–60% 60–70% 70-80%
U.S. senator before election
Dan Sullivan
Republican
Elected U.S. senator
Dan Sullivan
Republican

One-term Republican Dan Sullivan was elected in 2014, defeating incumbent Democrat Mark Begich. He defeated independent challenger Al Gross to win a second term in office.

Potential Democratic candidates included Begich, who was the Democratic nominee for governor of Alaska in 2018, and Anchorage mayor Ethan Berkowitz, who was the Democratic nominee for governor of Alaska in 2010. One Democrat, Edgar Blatchford, filed to run by the June 1 filing deadline.

Gross, an orthopedic surgeon and fisherman, declared his candidacy on July 2, 2019, as an independent. He participated in a joint primary for the Alaska Democratic Party, Alaska Libertarian Party and Alaskan Independence Party, winning the nomination as an independent supported by the Democratic Party.

Despite predictions of a close race, Sullivan defeated Gross by 12.7 percentage points.

Alaska Republican primary
Party	Candidate	Votes	%
Republican	Dan Sullivan (incumbent)	65,257	100.00
Total votes		65,257	100.00

Alaska Democratic–Libertarian–Independence primary
Party	Candidate	Votes	%
Independent	Al Gross	50,047	79.87
Democratic	Edgar Blatchford	5,463	8.72
Independence	John Howe	4,165	6.65
Independent	Christopher Cumings	2,989	4.77
Total votes		62,664	100.00

Alaska general election
Party	Candidate	Votes	%	±%
Republican	Dan Sullivan (incumbent)	191,112	53.90%	+5.94
Independent	Al Gross	146,068	41.19%	–4.64
Independence	John Howe	16,806	4.74%	+1.02
Write-in		601	0.17%	–0.32
Total votes		354,587	100.00%	
Republican hold				

== Arizona (special) ==
Arizona special election
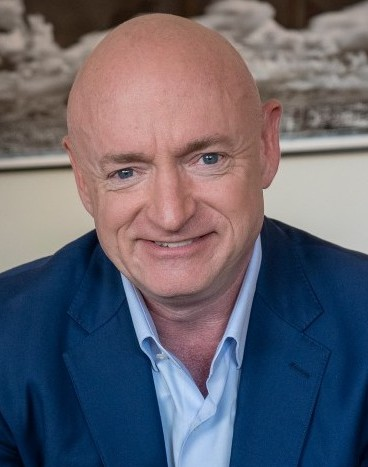

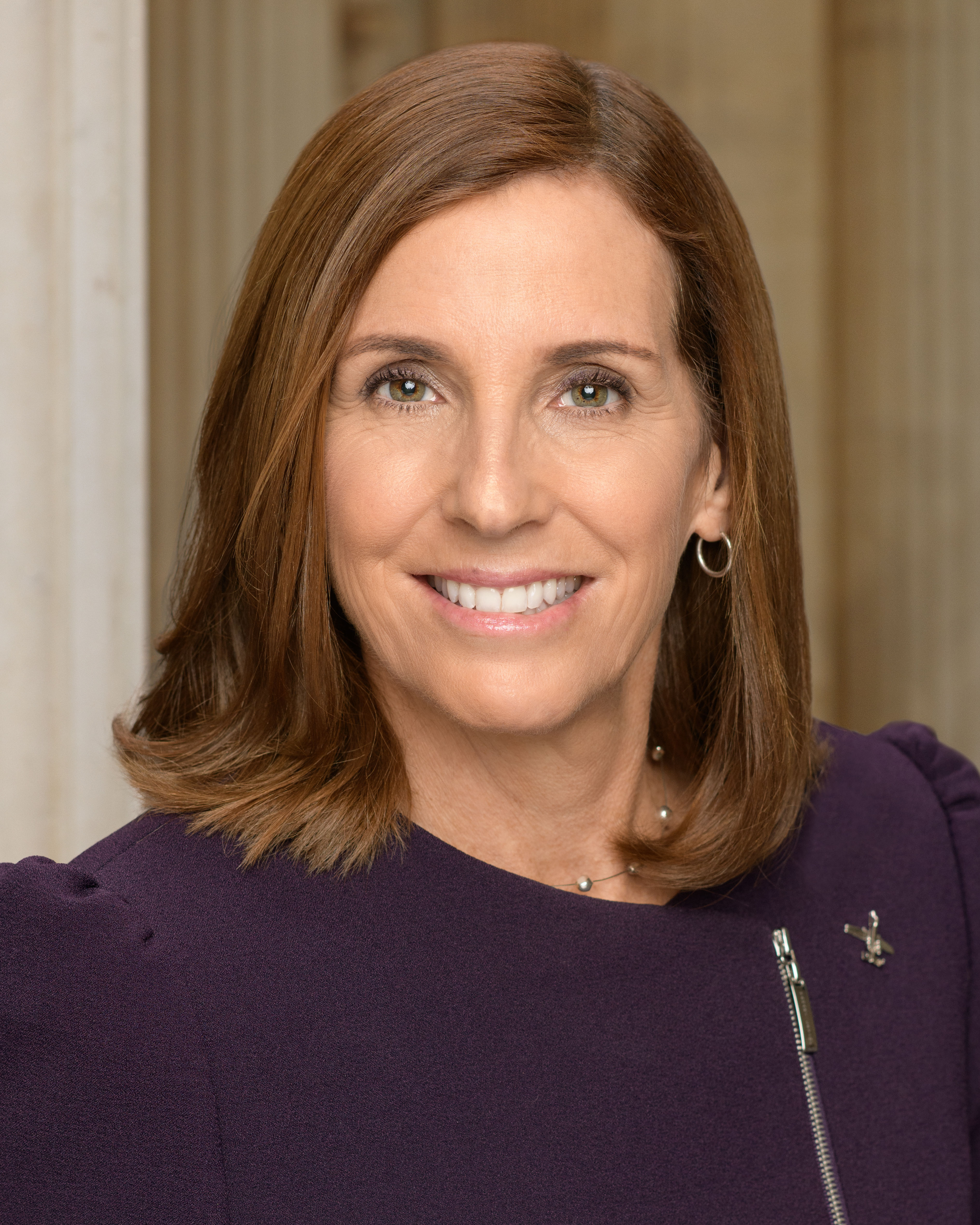
Nominee	Mark Kelly	Martha McSally
Party	Democratic	Republican
Popular vote	1,716,467	1,637,661
Percentage	51.16%	48.81%
- County results Kelly: 50–60% 60–70% 70–80% McSally: 50–60% 60–70% 70–80%
U.S. senator before election
Martha McSally
Republican
Elected U.S. senator
Mark Kelly
Democratic

Six-term Republican John McCain was re-elected in 2016, but died in office on August 25, 2018, after a battle with brain cancer. Republican governor Doug Ducey appointed former senator Jon Kyl to fill the seat temporarily. After Kyl resigned at the end of the year, Ducey appointed outgoing U.S. Representative Martha McSally to replace him after she lost the election to the other Arizona senate seat. McSally ran in the 2020 special election to fill the remaining two years of the term, losing to Democrat Mark Kelly, a former astronaut.

Once a solidly Republican state, Arizona trended more purple in the late 2010s. Incumbent Republican Martha McSally was appointed to McCain's seat two months after losing the 2018 Arizona U.S. Senate election to Democrat Kyrsten Sinema. Her Democratic opponent, astronaut Mark Kelly, raised significantly more money and generally led her by 5 to 15 points in the polling. McSally also suffered from low approval ratings due to her strong allegiance to Trump, who was unpopular in Arizona despite having won the state by 3.5 points in 2016.

Arizona Republican primary
Party	Candidate	Votes	%
Republican	Martha McSally (incumbent)	551,119	75.20
Republican	Daniel McCarthy	181,551	24.77
Write-in		210	0.03
Total votes		732,880	100.00

Arizona Democratic primary
Party	Candidate	Votes	%
Democratic	Mark Kelly	665,620	99.93
Write-in		451	0.07
Total votes		666,071	100.00

Arizona special election
Party	Candidate	Votes	%	±%
Democratic	Mark Kelly	1,716,467	51.16%	+10.41
Republican	Martha McSally (incumbent)	1,637,661	48.81%	–4.90
Write-in		1,189	0.03%	–0.03
Total votes		3,355,317	100.00%	
Democratic gain from Republican				

== Arkansas ==
Arkansas election
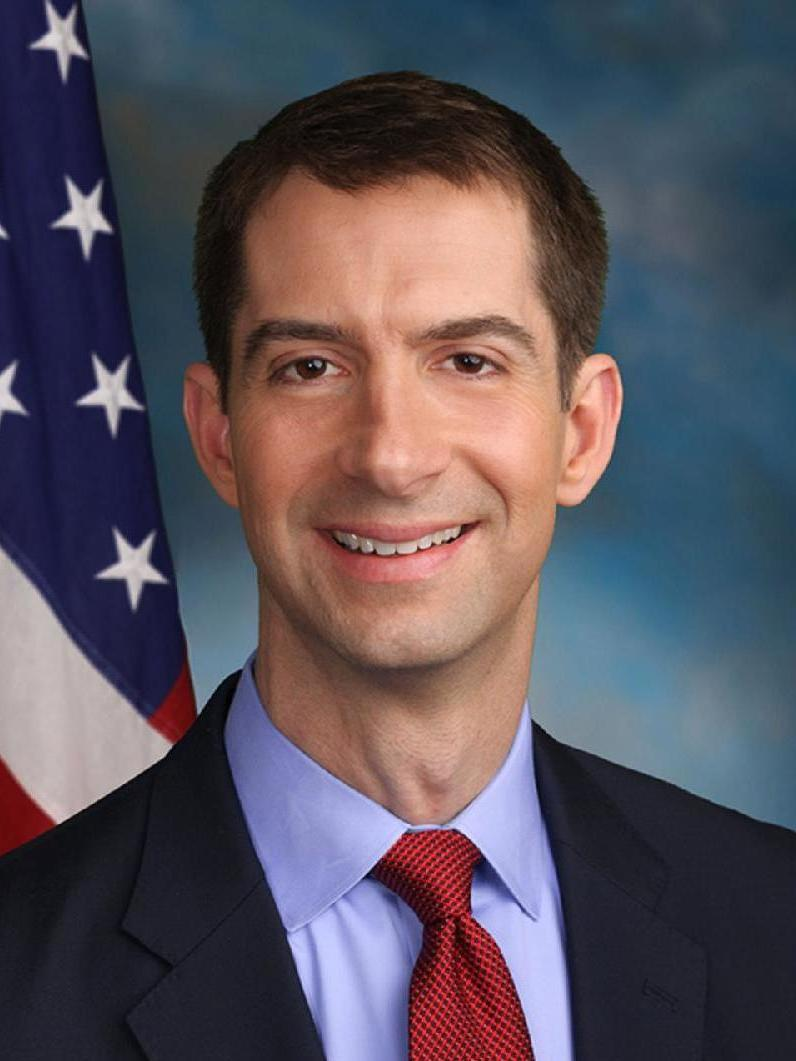

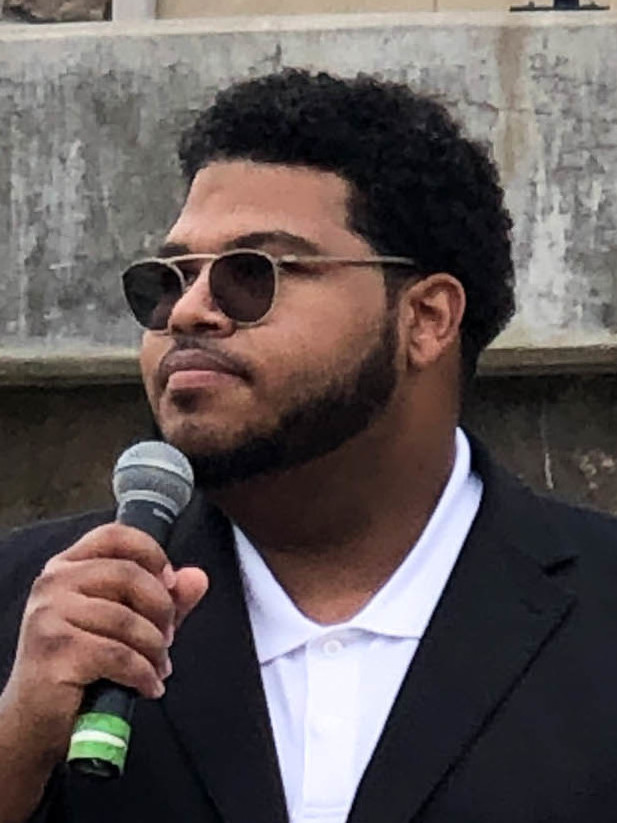
Nominee	Tom Cotton	Ricky Dale Harrington Jr.
Party	Republican	Libertarian
Popular vote	793,871	399,390
Percentage	66.5%	33.5%
- County results Cotton: 50–60% 60–70% 70–80% 80–90% Harrington: 50–60%
U.S. senator before election
Tom Cotton
Republican
Elected U.S. senator
Tom Cotton
Republican

One-term Republican Tom Cotton was elected in 2014, after serving two years in the United States House of Representatives, defeating incumbent Democratic senator Mark Pryor by a comfortable margin. Cotton was re-elected to a second term by a 33-point margin, defeating Libertarian Ricky Dale Harrington Jr.

Joshua Mahony, a non-profit executive and 2018 Democratic nominee for Congress in Arkansas's 3rd congressional district, filed to run for the Democratic nomination, but dropped out just after the filing deadline. No other Democrats filed within the filing deadline. Progressive activist Dan Whitfield ran as an independent, but suspended his campaign on October 1, 2020, after failing to qualify for the ballot.

Arkansas general election
Party	Candidate	Votes	%	±%
Republican	Tom Cotton (incumbent)	793,871	66.53%	+10.03
Libertarian	Ricky Dale Harrington Jr.	399,390	33.47%	+31.44
Total votes		1,193,261	100.00%	
Republican hold				

== Colorado ==
Colorado election
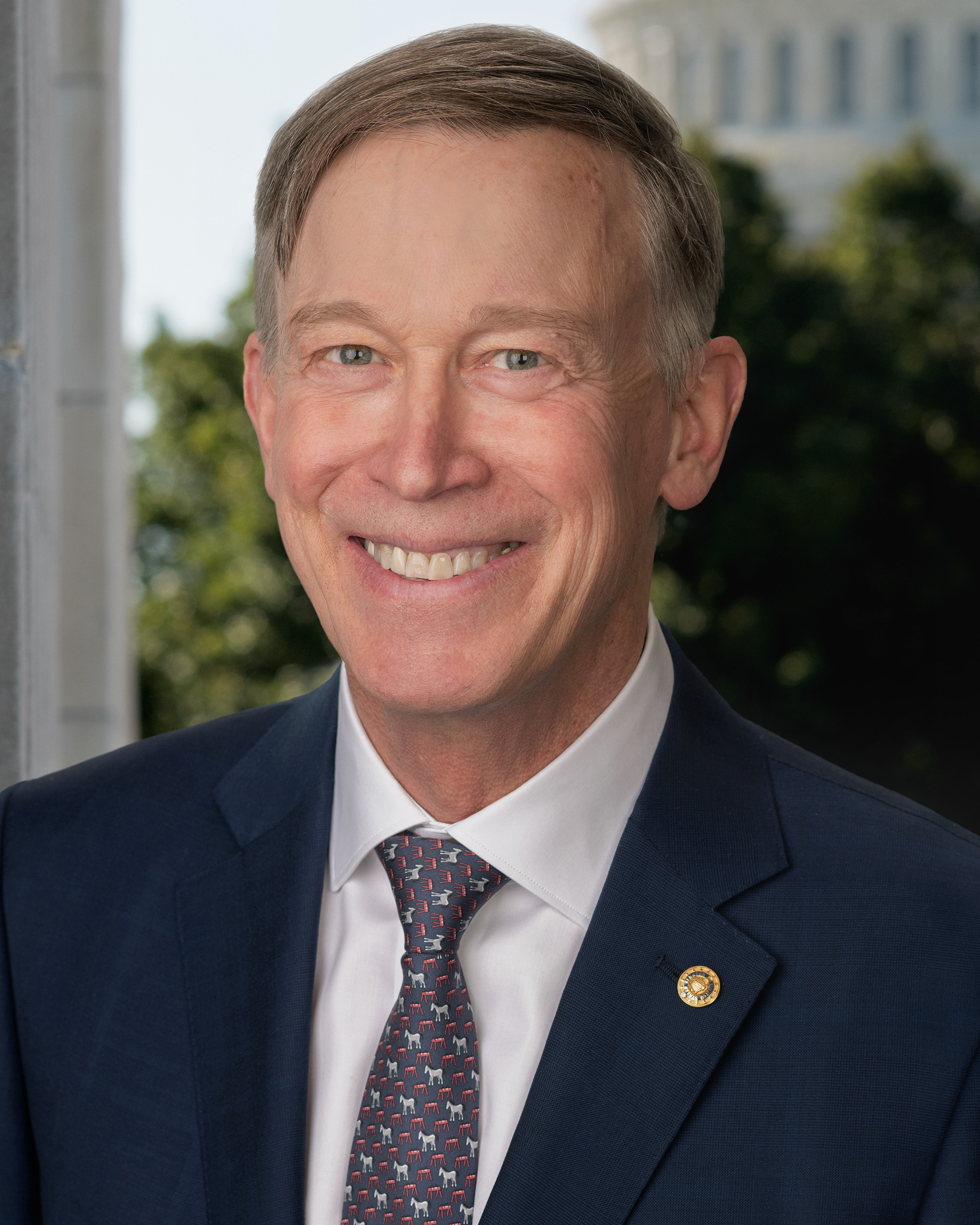

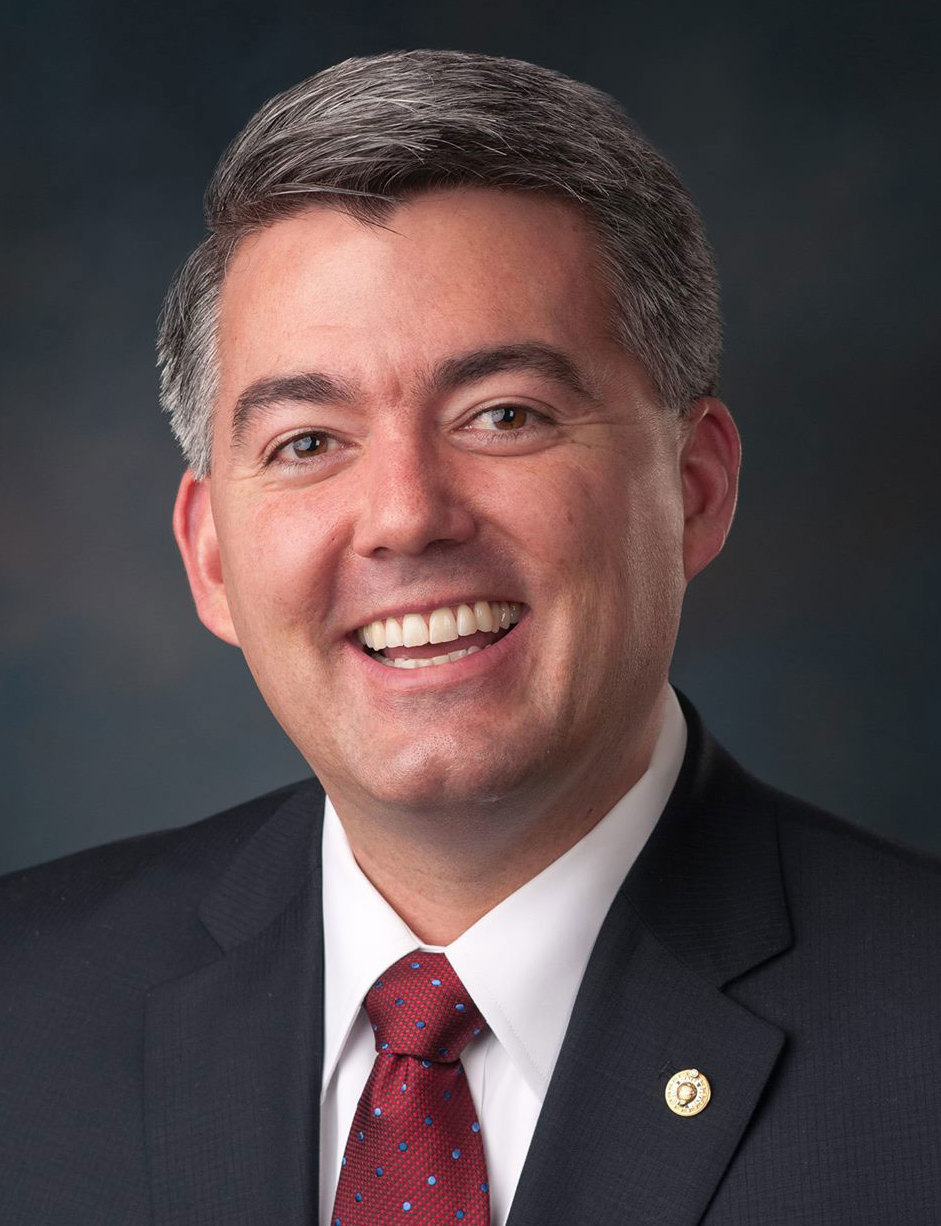
Nominee	John Hickenlooper	Cory Gardner
Party	Democratic	Republican
Popular vote	1,731,114	1,429,492
Percentage	53.5%	44.2%
- County results Hickenlooper: 40–50% 50–60% 60–70% 70–80% Gardner: 40–50% 50–60% 60–70% 70–80% 80–90%
U.S. senator before election
Cory Gardner
Republican
Elected U.S. senator
John Hickenlooper
Democratic

One-term Republican Cory Gardner was elected in 2014 after serving four years in the United States House of Representatives, narrowly defeating one-term Democrat Mark Udall. Gardner sought a second term but lost to Democrat John Hickenlooper by 9.3 percentage points.

Hickenlooper is a popular former governor of Colorado, and led Gardner by as much as 20 percentage points in polls, with most pundits considering him a heavy favorite. Gardner was Colorado's only Republican statewide officeholder, and the once purple state has trended increasingly Democratic since his narrow win in 2014. Gardner also had low approval ratings due to his strong allegiance to Trump, who lost Colorado in 2016 to Hillary Clinton by 4.9%, and in 2020 to Joe Biden by 13.5%. Hickenlooper also raised significantly more money than Gardner.

Colorado Republican primary
Party	Candidate	Votes	%
Republican	Cory Gardner (incumbent)	554,806	100.00
Total votes		554,806	100.00

Colorado Democratic primary
Party	Candidate	Votes	%
Democratic	John Hickenlooper	585,826	58.65
Democratic	Andrew Romanoff	412,955	41.35
Total votes		998,781	100.00

Colorado general election
Party	Candidate	Votes	%	±%
Democratic	John Hickenlooper	1,731,114	53.50%	+7.24
Republican	Cory Gardner (incumbent)	1,429,492	44.18%	–4.03
Libertarian	Raymon Doane	56,262	1.74%	–0.85
Approval Voting	Daniel Doyle	9,820	0.30%	N/A
Unity	Stephen Evans	8,971	0.28%	–0.04
Total votes		3,235,659	100.00%	
Democratic gain from Republican				

== Delaware ==
Delaware election
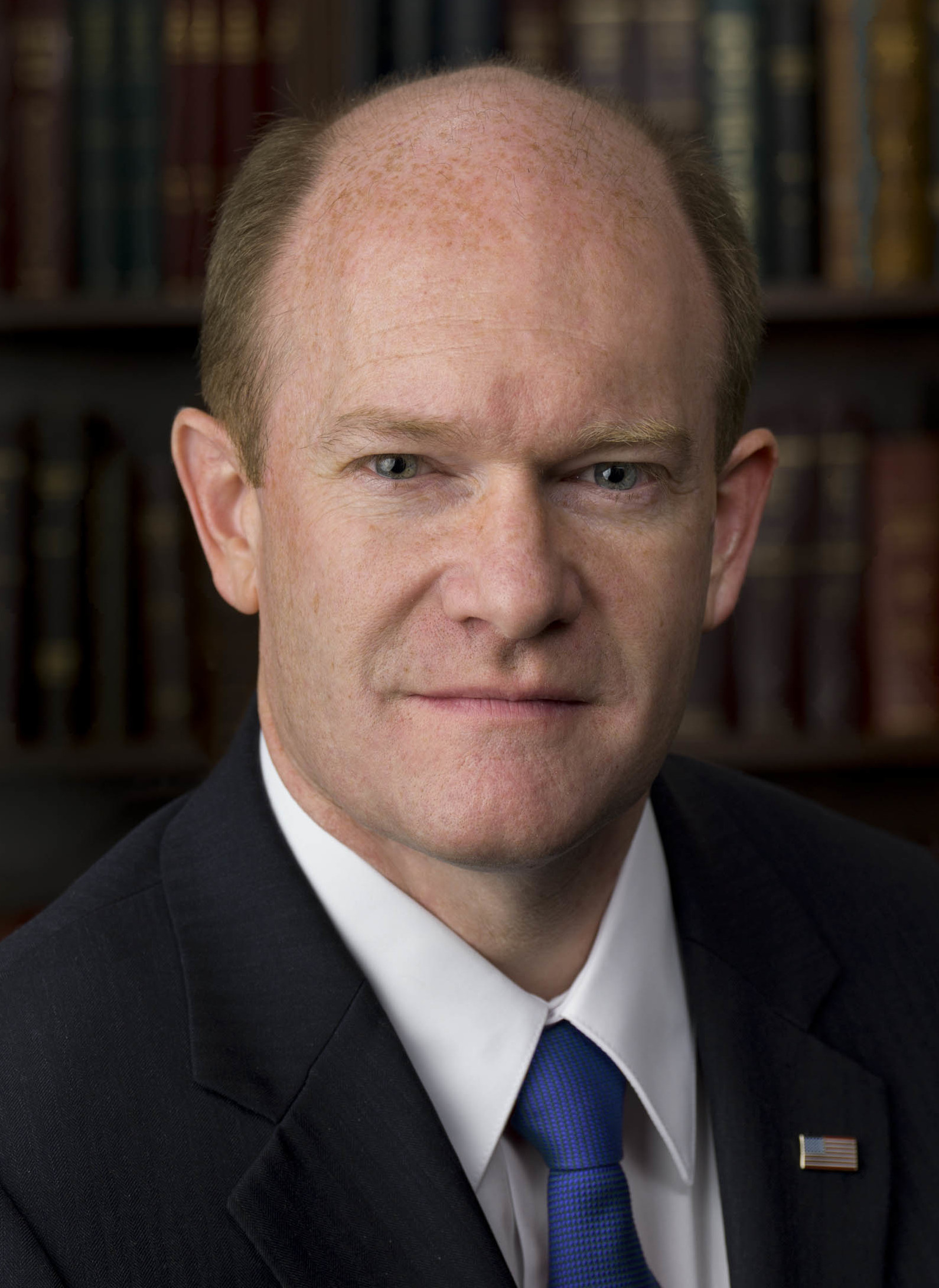

Nominee	Chris Coons	Lauren Witzke
Party	Democratic	Republican
Popular vote	291,804	186,054
Percentage	59.4%	37.9%
- County results Coons: 50–60% 60–70% Witzke: 50–60%
U.S. senator before election
Chris Coons
Democratic
Elected U.S. senator
Chris Coons
Democratic

One-term Democrat Chris Coons was re-elected in 2014; he first took office after winning a 2010 special election, which occurred after long-time senator Joe Biden resigned to become vice president of the United States (Biden also won the 2020 presidential election and became president). He faced an unsuccessful primary challenge from technology executive Jessica Scarane. Conservative activist Lauren Witzke and attorney Jim DeMartino ran for the Republican nomination.

The Delaware primary was held on September 15, 2020.

Delaware Democratic primary
Party	Candidate	Votes	%
Democratic	Chris Coons (incumbent)	87,332	72.85
Democratic	Jessica Scarane	32,547	27.15
Total votes		119,879	100.00

Republican primary results
Party	Candidate	Votes	%
Republican	Lauren Witzke	30,702	56.89
Republican	James DeMartino	23,266	43.11
Total votes		53,968	100.00

Delaware general election
Party	Candidate	Votes	%	±%
Democratic	Chris Coons (incumbent)	291,804	59.44%	+3.61
Republican	Lauren Witzke	186,054	37.90%	–4.33
Independent Party	Mark Turley	7,833	1.59%	N/A
Libertarian	Nadine Frost	5,244	1.07%	N/A
Total votes		490,935	100.00%	
Democratic hold				

== Georgia ==
Due to Republican senator Johnny Isakson's resignation from office for health reasons in 2019, both of Georgia's Senate seats were up for election in November 2020. The state had tilted Republican in Senate races since the mid-1990s, but increased support for Democrats in populous suburbs has made office elections more competitive; a close governor's race, multiple close U.S. House races, and many other close local office races resulted in Democratic gains in 2018 elections. Both the regular and special election were considered highly competitive toss-ups. Both of these elections received national attention, as if Republicans won at least one of these seats, they would maintain a Senate majority, but if the Democrats won both, the Senate would be split 50/50 with Vice President Kamala Harris breaking the tie.

=== Georgia (regular) ===
2020–21 United States Senate election in Georgia
- November 3, 2020 (first round); January 5, 2021 (runoff)
- Turnout: 65.4% ▲ (first round); 61.5% ▼ (runoff)
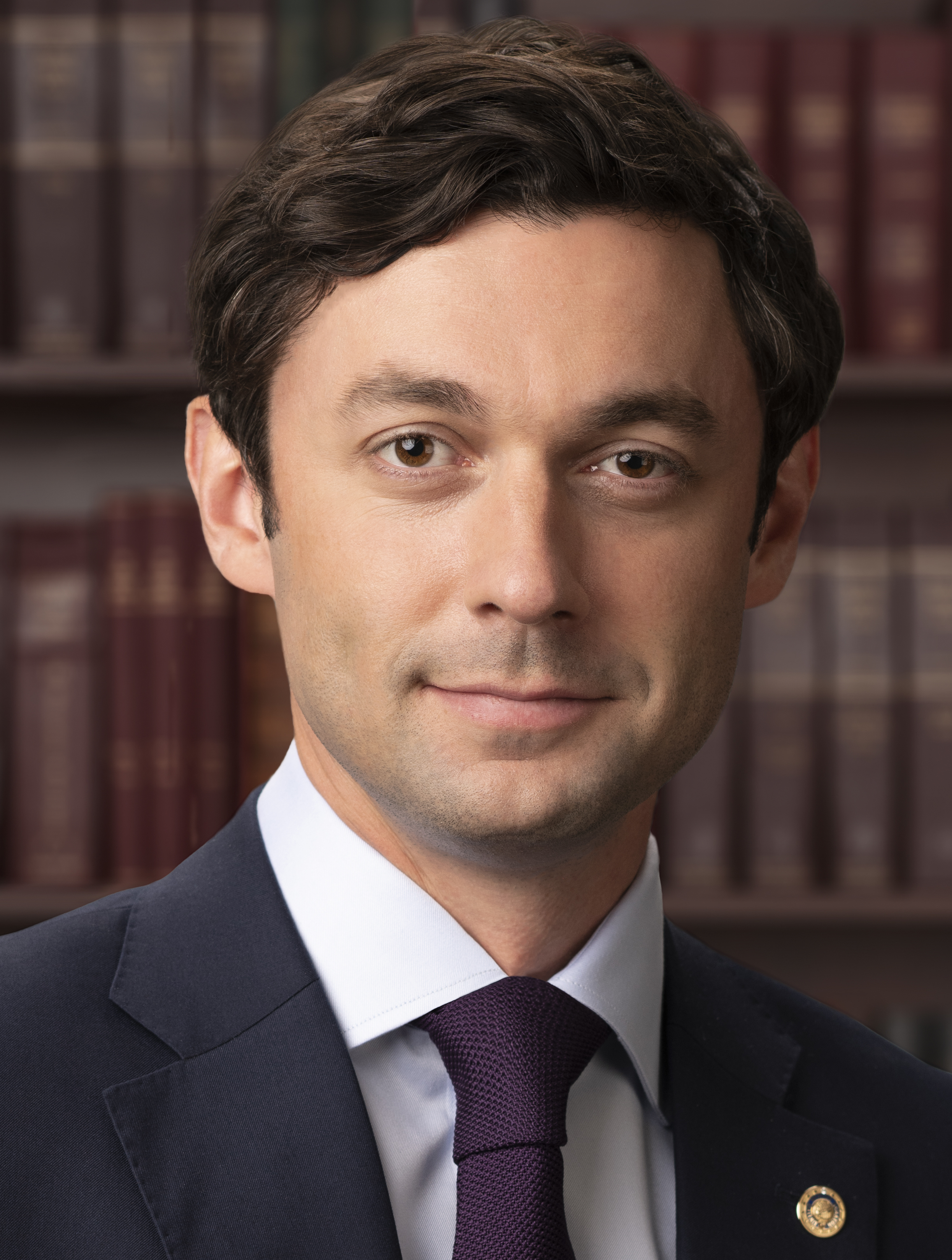

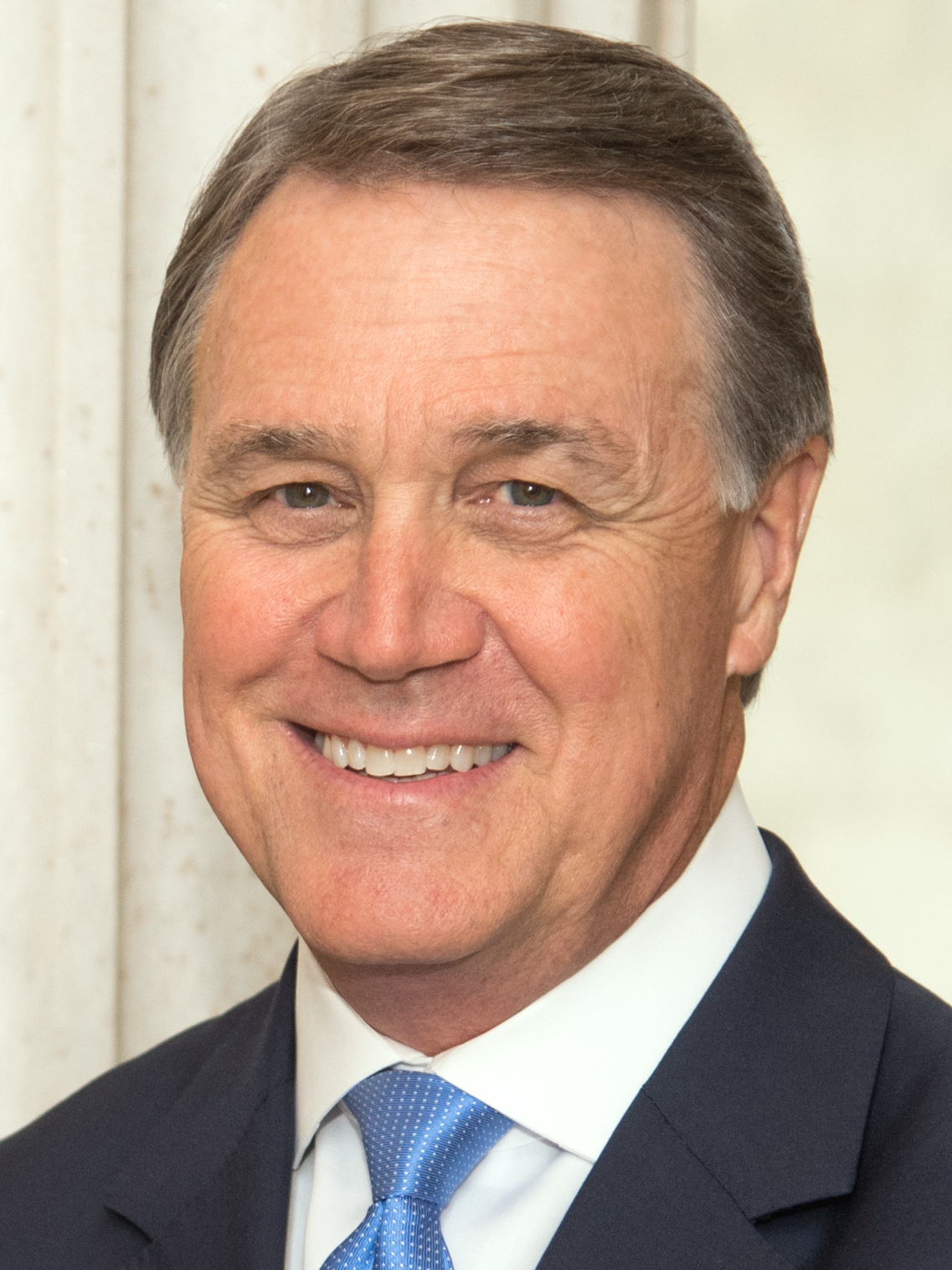
Candidate	Jon Ossoff	David Perdue
Party	Democratic	Republican
First round	2,374,519; 47.95%	2,462,617; 49.73%
Runoff	2,269,923; 50.61%	2,214,979; 49.39%
- County results Ossoff: 50–60% 60–70% 70–80% 80–90% Perdue: 40–50% 50–60% 60–70% 70–80% 80–90% >90%
U.S. senator before election
David Perdue
Republican
Elected U.S. Senator
Jon Ossoff
Democratic

One-term Republican David Perdue was elected in 2014, and sought a second term.

Jon Ossoff, a former congressional candidate, documentary film producer, and investigative journalist, defeated former Columbus mayor Teresa Tomlinson and 2018 lieutenant governor nominee Sarah Riggs Amico in the Democratic primary to secure nomination. He faced incumbent Republican David Perdue in the November 3 election.

In the November election, no candidate received 50% or more of the total vote; per Georgia law, the election advanced to a run-off between the top two finishers, Ossoff and Perdue, on January 5, 2021. Ossoff was projected the winner on January 6, and Perdue conceded on January 8.

Georgia Republican primary
Party	Candidate	Votes	%
Republican	David Perdue (incumbent)	992,555	100.00
Total votes		992,555	100.00

Georgia Democratic primary
Party	Candidate	Votes	%
Democratic	Jon Ossoff	626,819	52.82
Democratic	Teresa Tomlinson	187,416	15.79
Democratic	Sarah Riggs Amico	139,574	11.76
Democratic	Maya Dillard-Smith	105,000	8.85
Democratic	James Knox	49,452	4.17
Democratic	Marckeith DeJesus	45,936	3.87
Democratic	Tricia Carpenter McCracken	32,463	2.74
Total votes		1,186,660	100.00

Georgia general election
Party	Candidate	Votes	%	±%
Republican	David Perdue (incumbent)	2,462,617	49.73%	–3.16
Democratic	Jon Ossoff	2,374,519	47.95%	+2.74
Libertarian	Shane T. Hazel	115,039	2.32%	+0.42
Total votes		4,952,175	100.00%	

Georgia general election runoff
Party	Candidate	Votes	%	±%
Democratic	Jon Ossoff	2,269,923	50.61%	+5.40
Republican	David Perdue (incumbent)	2,214,979	49.39%	–3.50
Total votes		4,484,902	100.00%	
Democratic gain from Republican				

=== Georgia (special) ===
2020–21 United States Senate special election in Georgia
- November 3, 2020 (first round); January 5, 2021 (runoff)
- Turnout: 65.3% ▲ (first round); 59.7% ▼ (runoff)
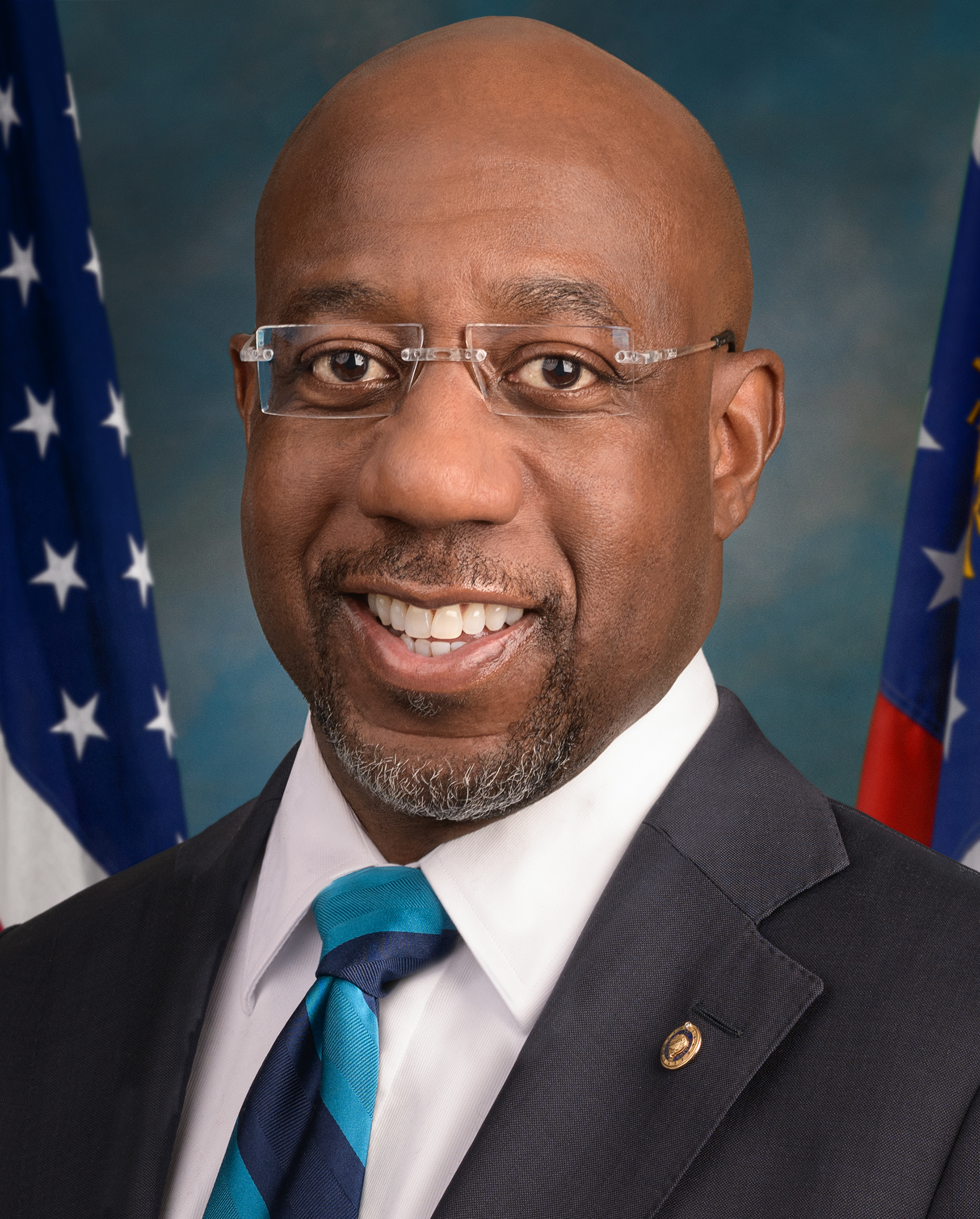

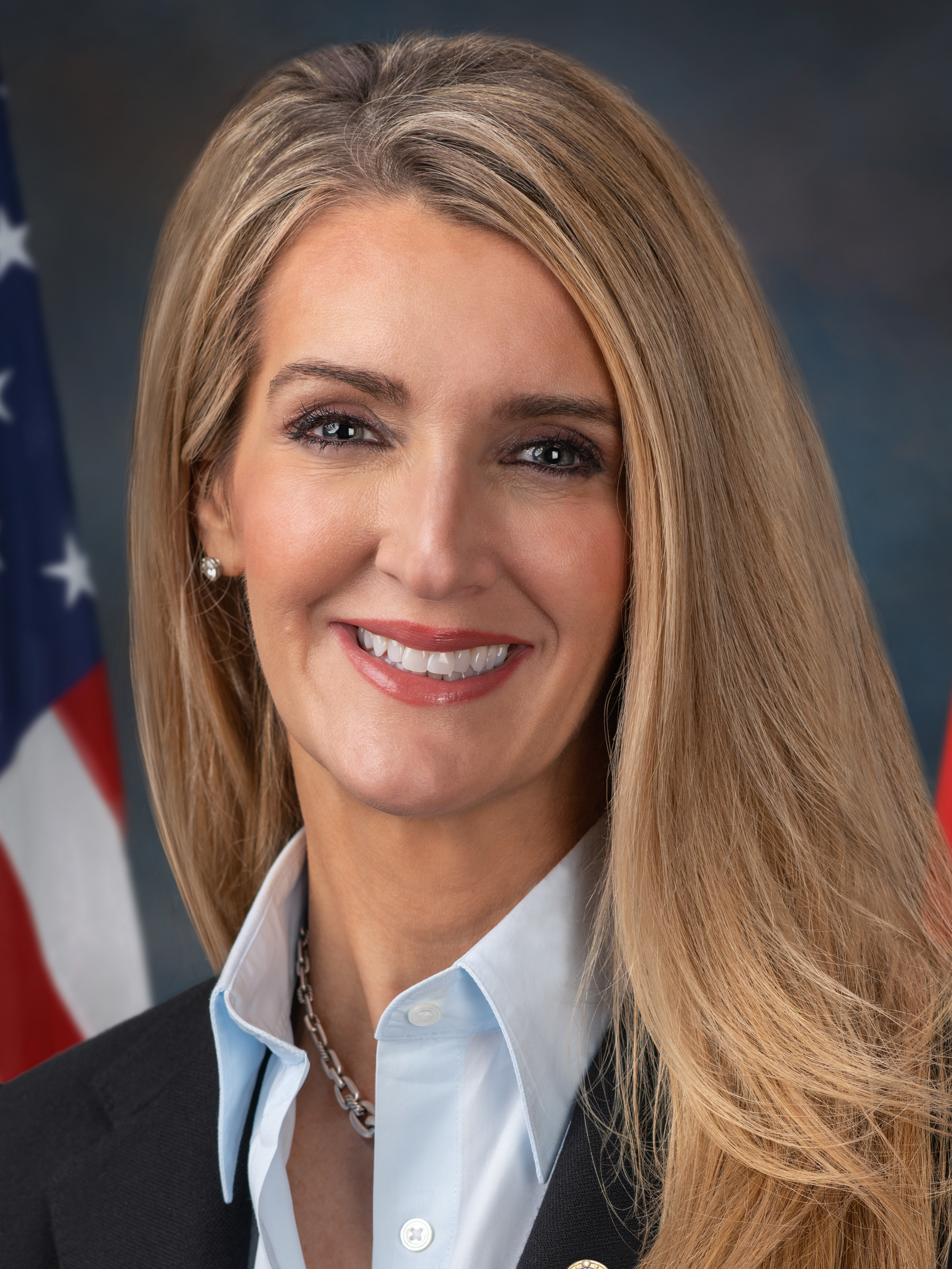

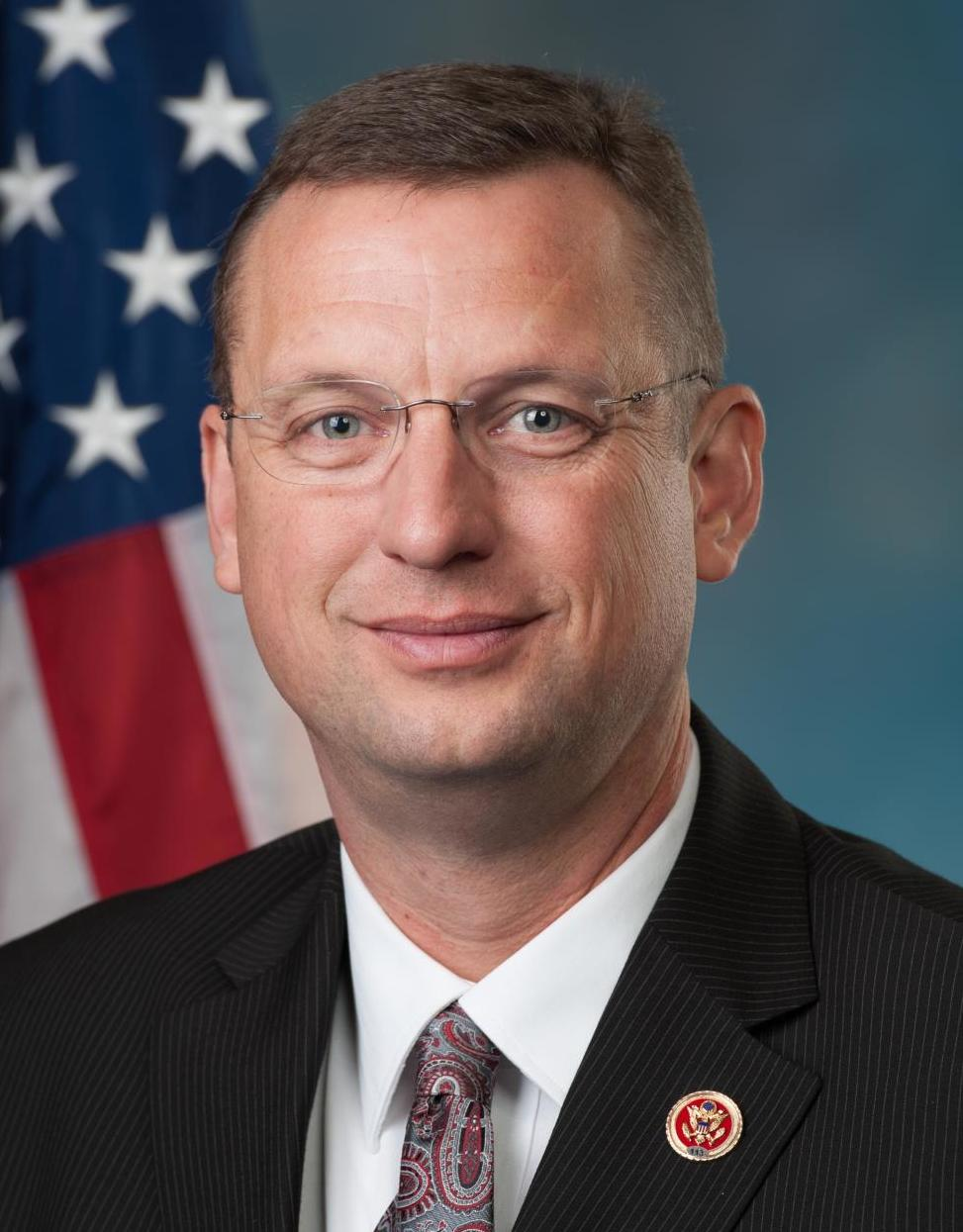

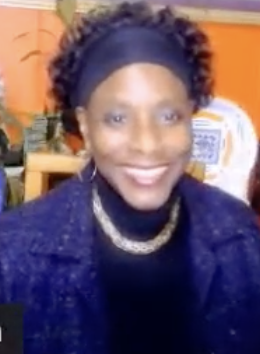
Candidate	Raphael Warnock	Kelly Loeffler
Party	Democratic	Republican
First round	1,617,035; 32.90%	1,273,214; 25.91%
Runoff	2,289,113; 51.04%	2,195,841; 48.96%
Candidate	Doug Collins	Deborah Jackson
Party	Republican	Democratic
First round	980,454; 19.95%	324,118; 6.59%
Runoff	Eliminated	Eliminated
- Warnock: 20–30% 30–40% 40–50% 50–60% 60–70% 70–80% 80–90% Loeffler: 20–30% 30–40% 40–50% 50–60% 60–70% 70–80% 80–90% >90% Collins: 20–30% 30–40% 40–50% 50–60%
U.S. senator before election
Kelly Loeffler
Republican
Elected U.S. Senator
Raphael Warnock
Democratic

Three-term senator Johnny Isakson announced on August 28, 2019, that he would resign from the Senate on December 31, 2019, citing health concerns. Georgia governor Brian Kemp appointed Republican Kelly Loeffler to replace Isakson until a special election could be held; Loeffler took office on January 6, 2020, and competed in the November 2020 election to retain her seat.

Other Republicans who ran for the seat included Wayne Johnson, former chief operating officer of the Office of Federal Student Aid, and four-term U.S. representative Doug Collins.

A "jungle primary" was held November 3, 2020, but no candidate won more than 50% of the vote, so a run-off election between the top two finishers, Loeffler and Democratic challenger Raphael Warnock, was held on January 5, 2021. Warnock defeated Loeffler, who initially refused to concede and vowed to challenge the outcome, but conceded on January 7, after the storming of the U.S. Capitol.

Georgia special election
Party	Candidate	Votes	%
Democratic	Raphael Warnock	1,617,035	32.90
Republican	Kelly Loeffler (incumbent)	1,273,214	25.91
Republican	Doug Collins	980,454	19.95
Democratic	Deborah Jackson	324,118	6.59
Democratic	Matt Lieberman	136,021	2.77
Democratic	Tamara Johnson-Shealey	106,767	2.17
Democratic	Jamesia James	94,406	1.92
Republican	Derrick Grayson	51,592	1.05
Democratic	Joy Felicia Slade	44,945	0.91
Republican	Annette Davis Jackson	44,335	0.90
Republican	Kandiss Taylor	40,349	0.82
Republican	Wayne Johnson (withdrawn)	36,176	0.74
Libertarian	Brian Slowinski	35,431	0.72
Democratic	Richard Dien Winfield	28,687	0.58
Democratic	Ed Tarver	26,333	0.54
Independent	Allen Buckley	17,954	0.36
Green	John Fortuin	15,293	0.31
Independent	Al Bartell	14,640	0.30
Independent	Valencia Stovall	13,318	0.27
Independent	Michael Todd Greene	13,293	0.27
Total votes		4,914,361	100.00

Georgia special election runoff
Party	Candidate	Votes	%	±%
Democratic	Raphael Warnock	2,289,113	51.04%	+10.00
Republican	Kelly Loeffler (incumbent)	2,195,841	48.96%	–5.84
Total votes		4,484,954	100.00%	
Democratic gain from Republican				

== Idaho ==
Idaho election
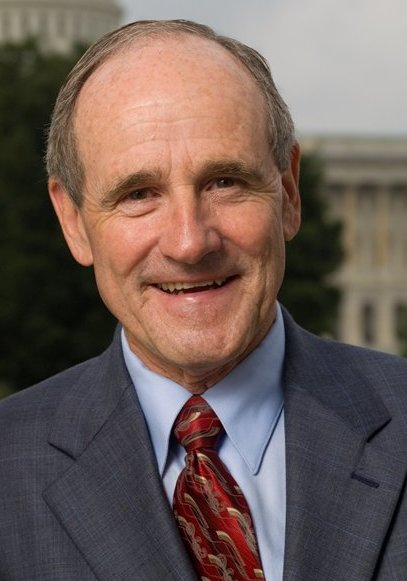

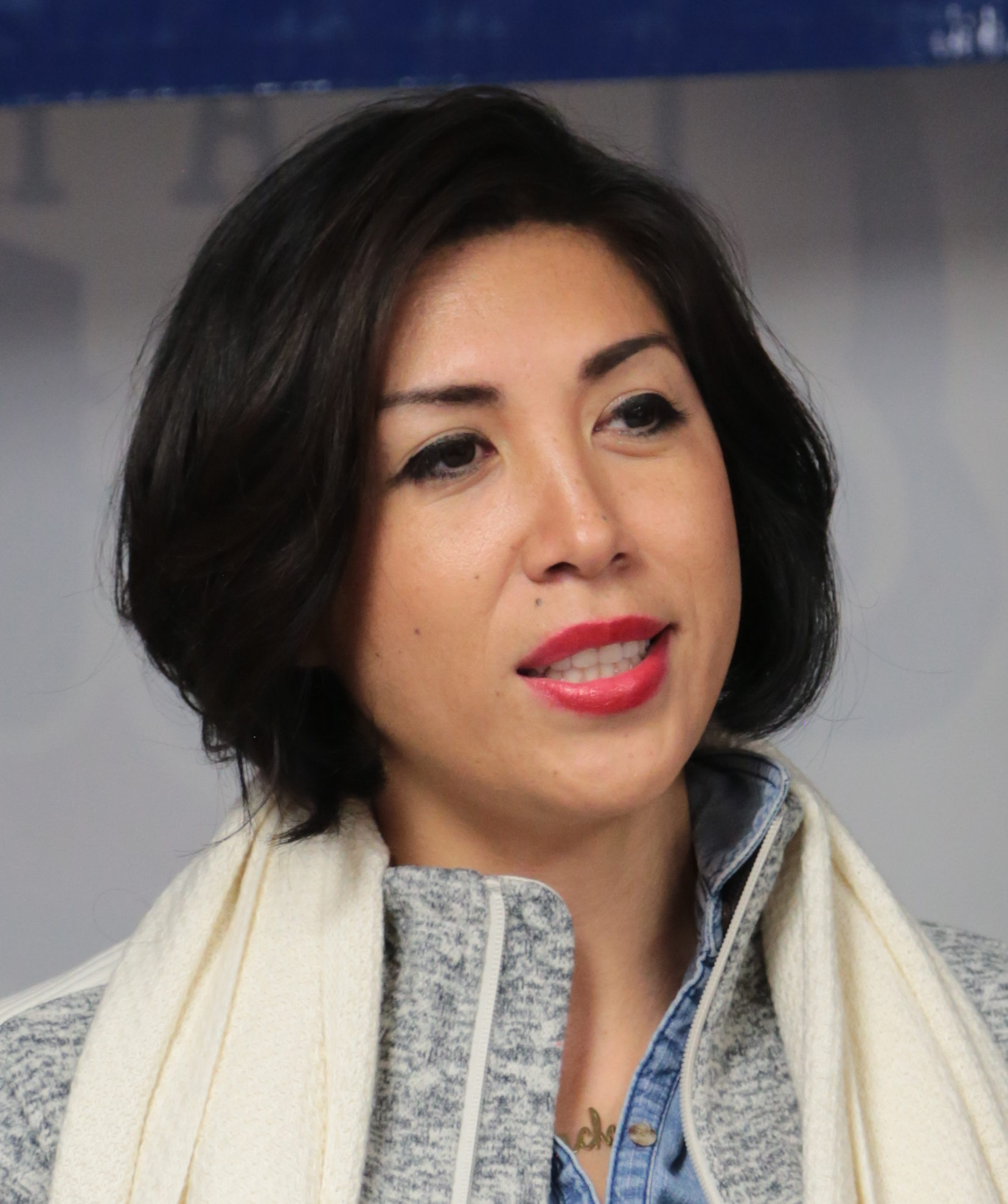
Nominee	Jim Risch	Paulette Jordan
Party	Republican	Democratic
Popular vote	537,446	285,864
Percentage	62.6%	33.3%
- County results Risch: 50–60% 60–70% 70–80% 80–90% Jordan: 50–60% 60–70%
U.S. senator before election
Jim Risch
Republican
Elected U.S. senator
Jim Risch
Republican

Two-term republican Jim Risch successfully ran for a third term in 2020, defeating Democrat Paulette Jordan in a landslide. Jordan is a former gubernatorial nominee and former Coeur d'Alene Tribal Councilwoman.

Idaho Republican primary
Party	Candidate	Votes	%
Republican	Jim Risch (incumbent)	200,184	100.00
Total votes		200,184	100.00

Idaho Democratic primary
Party	Candidate	Votes	%
Democratic	Paulette Jordan	72,778	85.70
Democratic	James Vandermaas	12,145	14.30
Total votes		84,923	100.00

Idaho general election
Party	Candidate	Votes	%	±%
Republican	Jim Risch (incumbent)	538,446	62.62%	–2.71
Democratic	Paulette Jordan	285,864	33.25%	–1.42
Independent	Natalie Fleming	25,329	2.95%	N/A
Constitution	Ray Writz	10,188	1.18%	N/A
Total votes		859,827	100.00%	
Republican hold				

== Illinois ==
Illinois election
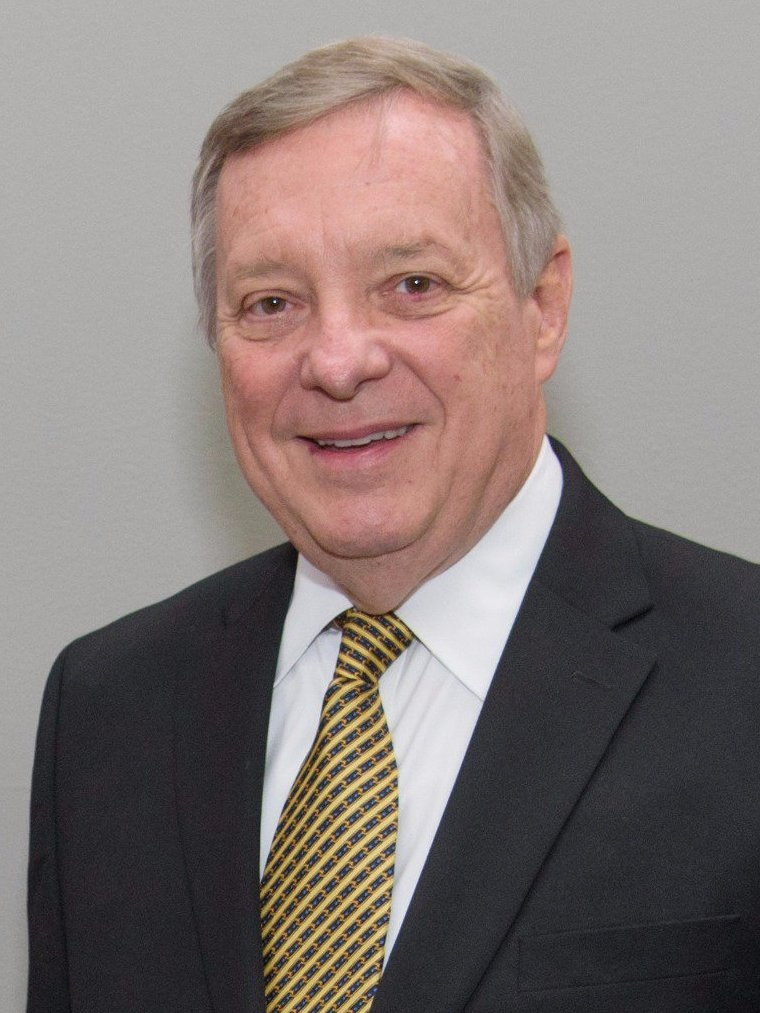

Nominee	Dick Durbin	Mark Curran
Party	Democratic	Republican
Popular vote	3,278,930	2,319,870
Percentage	54.9%	38.9%
- County results Durbin: 40–50% 50–60% 60–70% 70–80% Curran: 40–50% 50–60% 60–70% 70–80% 80–90%
U.S. senator before election
Dick Durbin
Democratic
Elected U.S. senator
Dick Durbin
Democratic

Four-term democrat and Senate minority whip Dick Durbin, easily won a fifth term in office, defeating Republican Mark Curran by a 16-point margin.

Curran served as sheriff of Lake County from 2006 to 2018 and won the Republican primary with 41.55% of the vote.

Antiwar activist Marilyn Jordan Lawlor and state representative Anne Stava-Murray briefly challenged Durbin in the Democratic primary, but both ended up withdrawing.

2019 Chicago mayoral candidate Willie Wilson, a businessman and perennial candidate, ran as a member of the "Willie Wilson Party," with the backing of a handful of Chicago aldermen and the Chicago Police Union.

Illinois Democratic primary
Party	Candidate	Votes	%
Democratic	Dick Durbin (incumbent)	1,446,118	100.00
Total votes		1,446,118	100.00

Illinois Republican primary
Party	Candidate	Votes	%
Republican	Mark Curran	205,747	41.55
Republican	Peggy Hubbard	113,189	22.86
Republican	Robert Marshall	75,561	15.26
Republican	Tom Tarter	73,009	14.74
Republican	Casey Chlebek	27,655	5.58
Write-in		7	0.00
Total votes		495,168	100.00

Illinois general election
Party	Candidate	Votes	%	±%
Democratic	Dick Durbin (incumbent)	3,278,930	54.93%	+1.38
Republican	Mark Curran	2,319,870	38.87%	–3.82
Willie Wilson	Willie Wilson	237,699	3.98%	N/A
Libertarian	Danny Malouf	75,673	1.27%	–2.49
Green	David Black	55,711	0.95%	N/A
Write-in		18	0.00%	±0.00
Total votes		5,967,901	100.00%	
Democratic hold				

== Iowa ==
Iowa election
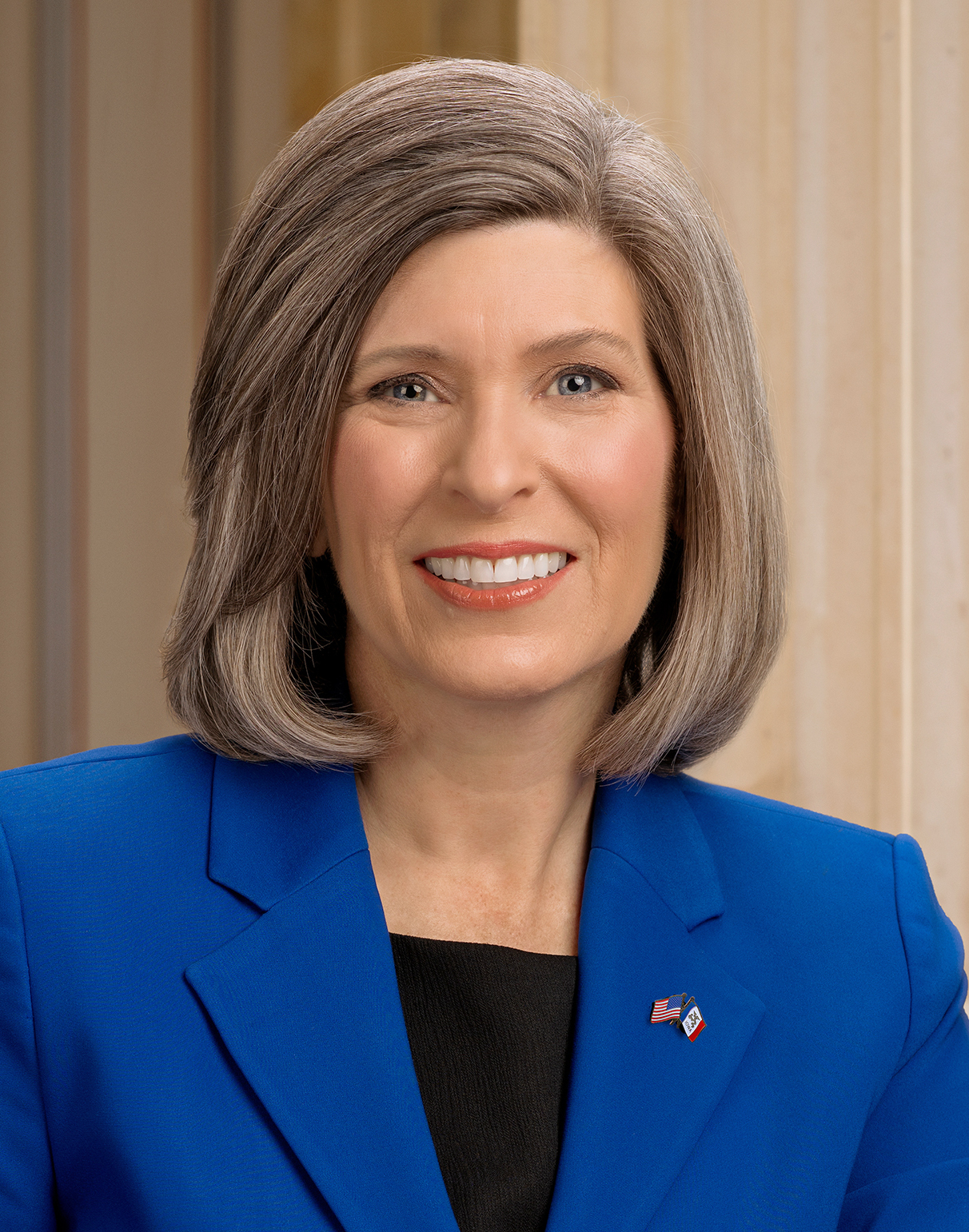

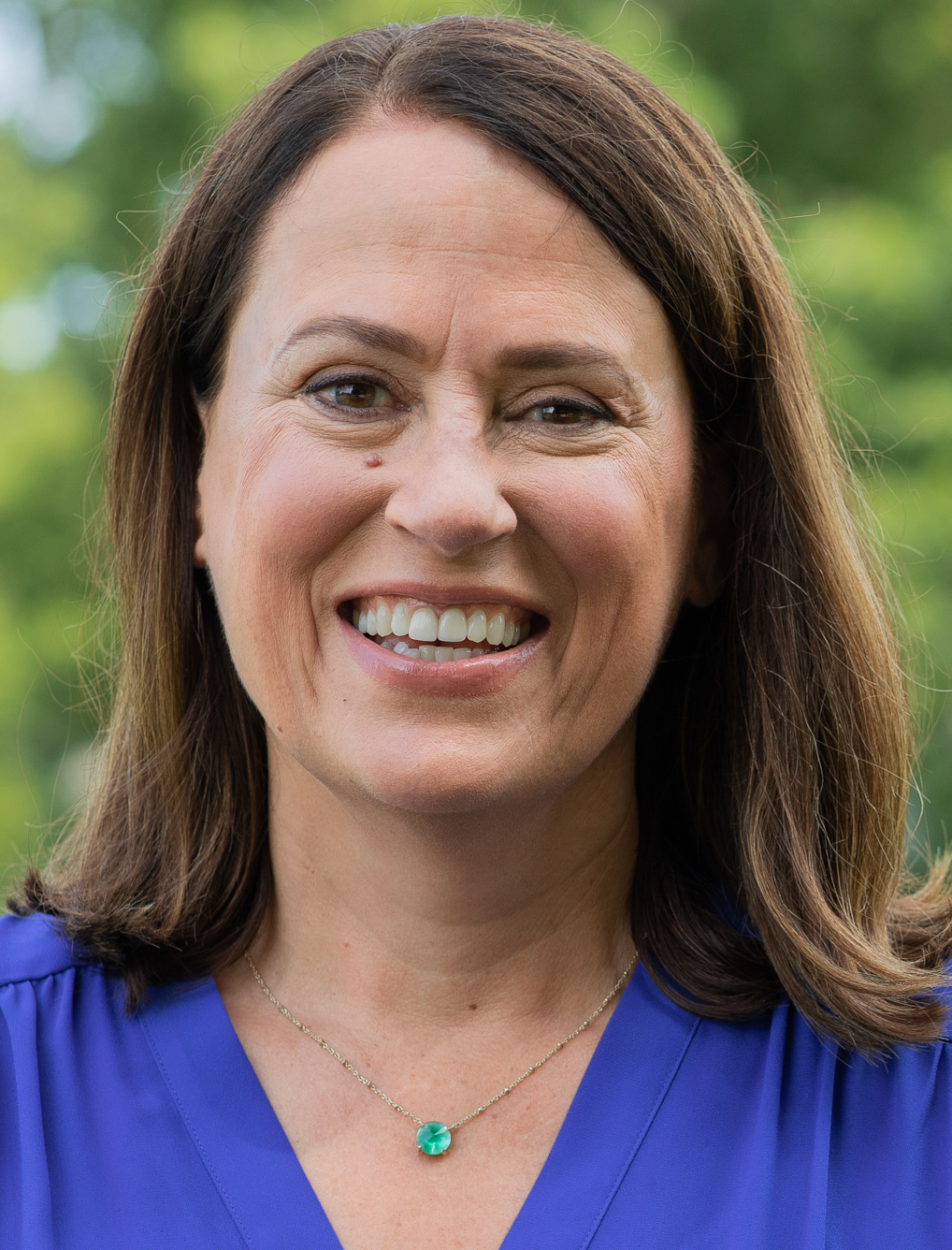
Nominee	Joni Ernst	Theresa Greenfield
Party	Republican	Democratic
Popular vote	864,997	754,859
Percentage	51.7%	45.2%
- County results Ernst: 40–50% 50–60% 60–70% 70–80% 80–90% Greenfield: 40–50% 50–60% 60–70%
U.S. senator before election
Joni Ernst
Republican
Elected U.S. senator
Joni Ernst
Republican

One-term republican Joni Ernst, first elected to the Senate in 2014, won a second term in office, defeating Democrat Theresa Greenfield.

Greenfield won the Democratic nomination, defeating former vice-admiral Michael T. Franken, attorney Kimberly Graham, and businessman Eddie Mauro in the primary.

Ernst's popularity had dropped in polls, and many considered this seat a possible Democratic pick-up, but Ernst was re-elected by a larger-than-expected 6.5 points.

Iowa Republican primary
Party	Candidate	Votes	%
Republican	Joni Ernst (incumbent)	226,589	98.64
Write-in		3,132	1.36
Total votes		229,721	100.00

Democratic primary results
Party	Candidate	Votes	%
Democratic	Theresa Greenfield	132,001	47.71
Democratic	Michael T. Franken	68,851	24.88
Democratic	Kimberly Graham	41,554	15.02
Democratic	Eddie Mauro	30,400	10.99
Democratic	Cal Woods (withdrawn)	3,372	1.21
Write-in		514	0.19
Total votes		276,692	100.00

Iowa general election
Party	Candidate	Votes	%	±%
Republican	Joni Ernst (incumbent)	864,997	51.74%	–0.36
Democratic	Theresa Greenfield	754,859	45.15%	+1.39
Libertarian	Rick Stewart	36,961	2.21%	+1.48
Independent	Suzanne Herzog	13,800	0.83%	N/A
Write-in		1,211	0.07%	–0.03
Total votes		1,671,828	100.00%	
Republican hold				

== Kansas ==
Kansas election
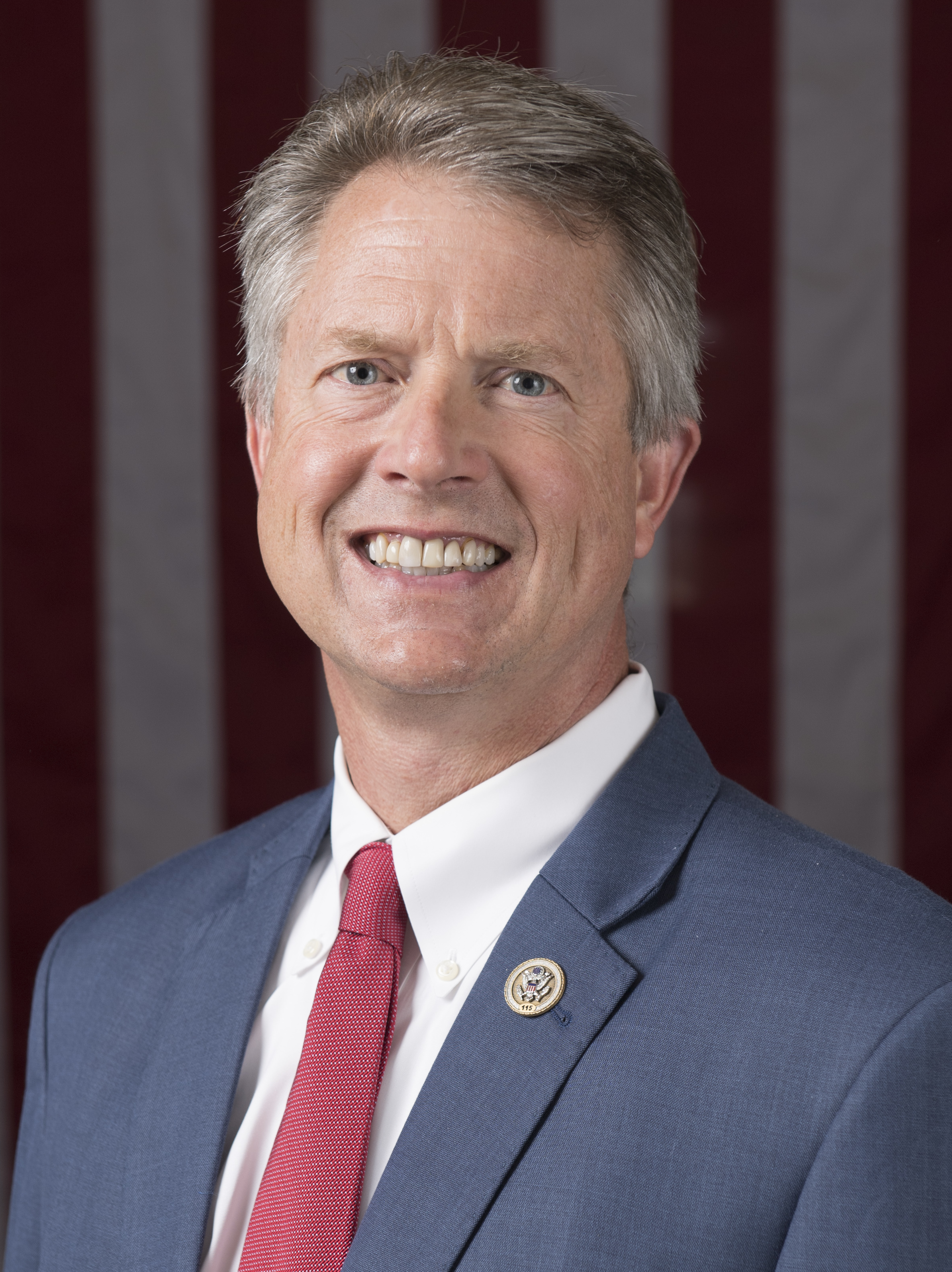

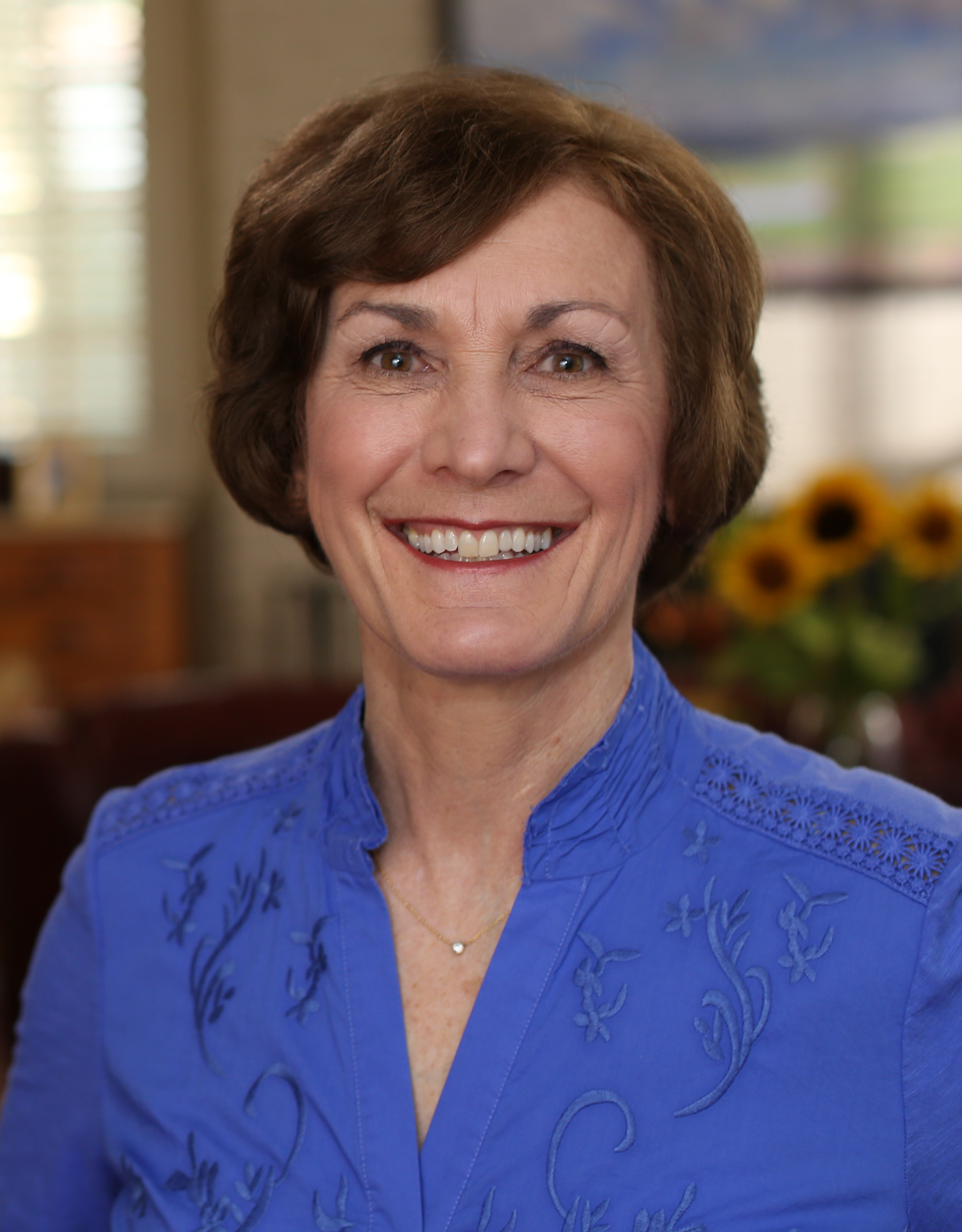
Nominee	Roger Marshall	Barbara Bollier
Party	Republican	Democratic
Popular vote	727,962	571,530
Percentage	53.2%	41.8%
- County results Marshall: 50–60% 60–70% 70–80% 80–90% >90% Bollier: 40–50% 50–60% 60–70%
U.S. senator before election
Pat Roberts
Republican
Elected U.S. senator
Roger Marshall
Republican

Four-term Republican Pat Roberts, was re-elected in 2014 with 53.15% of the vote, and announced on January 4, 2019, that he would not be running for re-election in 2020.

In the Republican primary, United States representative Roger Marshall defeated former Kansas secretary of state Kris Kobach, state Turnpike Authority chairman Dave Lindstrom, state senate president Susan Wagle, and others.

There was considerable speculation about a Senate bid by Mike Pompeo (the United States secretary of state, former director of the Central Intelligence Agency, and former U.S. representative for Kansas's 4th congressional district), but he did not run.

Barbara Bollier, a state senator and former Republican, defeated former congressional candidate Robert Tillman for the Democratic nomination, but lost to Marshall with a more than expected 11.4 point margin.

Kansas Republican primary
Party	Candidate	Votes	%
Republican	Roger Marshall	167,800	40.28
Republican	Kris Kobach	108,726	26.10
Republican	Bob Hamilton	77,952	18.71
Republican	Dave Lindstrom	27,451	6.59
Republican	Steve Roberts	8,141	1.95
Republican	Brian Matlock	7,083	1.70
Republican	Lance Berland	6,404	1.54
Republican	John Miller	4,431	1.06
Republican	Derek Ellis	3,970	0.95
Republican	Gabriel Robles	3,744	0.90
Republican	John Berman	861	0.21
Total votes		416,563	100.00

Kansas Democratic primary
Party	Candidate	Votes	%
Democratic	Barbara Bollier	168,759	85.34
Democratic	Robert Tillman	28,997	14.66
Total votes		197,756	100.00

Kansas general election
Party	Candidate	Votes	%	±%
Republican	Roger Marshall	727,962	53.22%	+0.07
Democratic	Barbara Bollier	571,530	41.79%	N/A
Libertarian	Jason Buckley	68,263	4.99%	+0.67
Total votes		1,367,755	100.00%	
Republican hold				

== Kentucky ==
Kentucky election
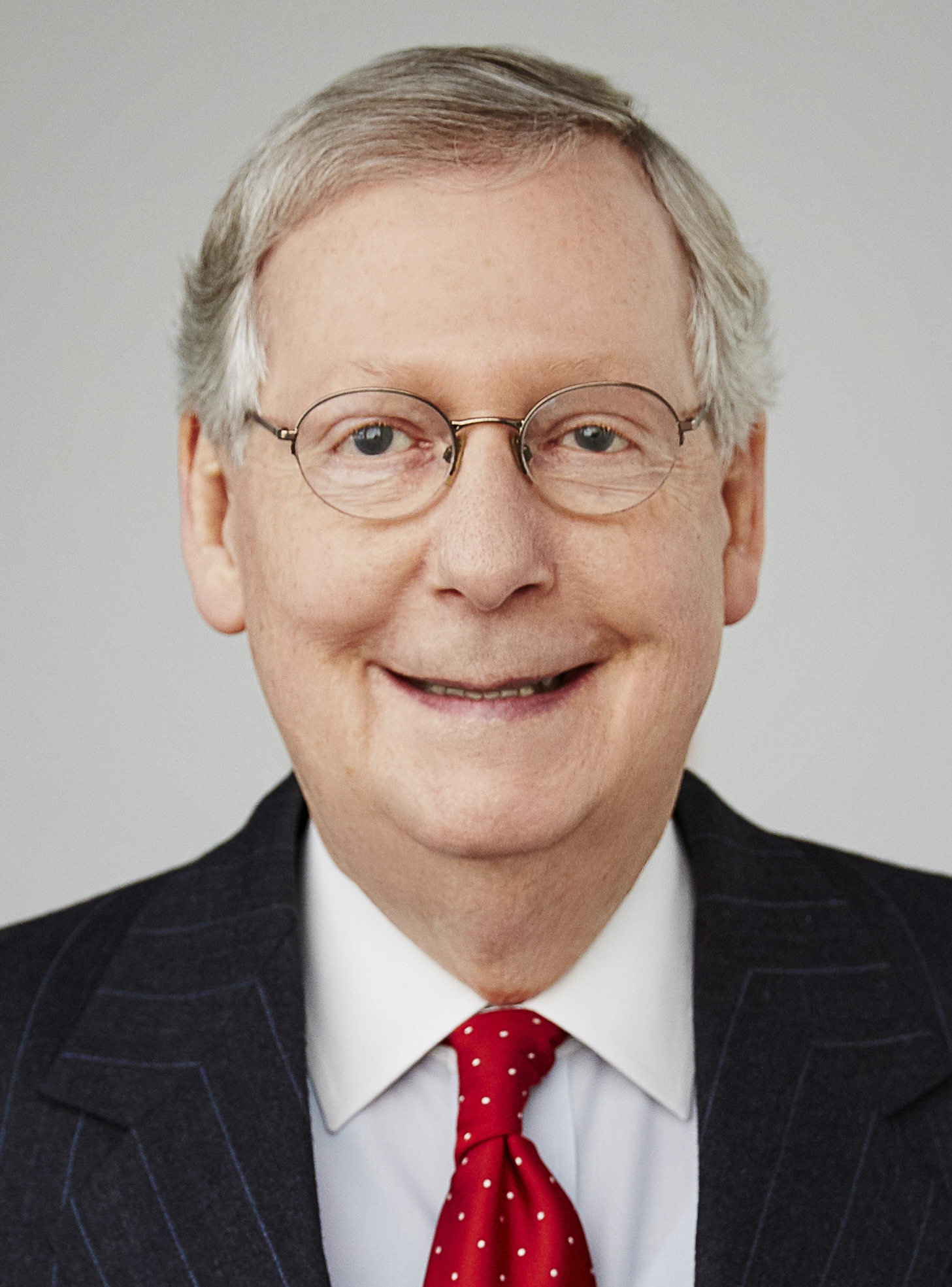

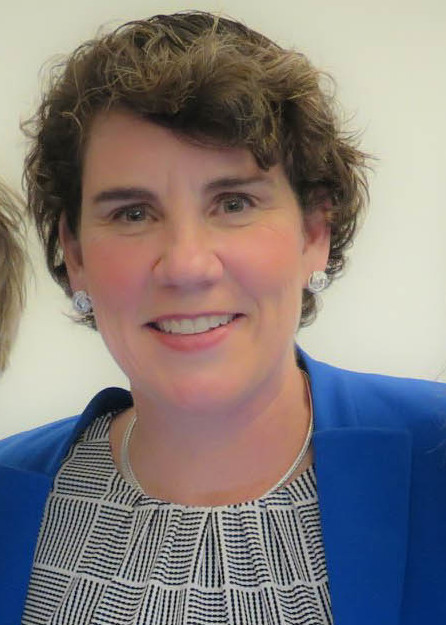
Nominee	Mitch McConnell	Amy McGrath
Party	Republican	Democratic
Popular vote	1,233,315	816,257
Percentage	57.8%	38.2%
- County results McConnell: 50–60% 60–70% 70–80% 80-90% McGrath: 50–60%
U.S. senator before election
Mitch McConnell
Republican
Elected U.S. senator
Mitch McConnell
Republican

Republican Mitch McConnell, the Senate Majority Leader, defeated Democrat Amy McGrath by 19.6 percentage points, winning a 7th term in office. This was his largest margin of victory since 2002.

Kentucky Republican primary
Party	Candidate	Votes	%
Republican	Mitch McConnell (incumbent)	342,660	82.80
Republican	C. Wesley Morgan	25,588	6.18
Republican	Louis Grider	13,771	3.33
Republican	Paul John Frangedakis	11,957	2.89
Republican	Neren James	10,693	2.58
Republican	Kenneth Lowndes	5,548	1.34
Republican	Nicholas Alsager	3,603	0.87
Total votes		413,820	100.00

Kentucky Democratic primary
Party	Candidate	Votes	%
Democratic	Amy McGrath	247,037	45.41
Democratic	Charles Booker	231,888	42.62
Democratic	Mike Broihier	27,175	4.99
Democratic	Mary Ann Tobin	11,108	2.04
Democratic	Maggie Joe Hilliard	6,224	1.14
Democratic	Andrew Maynard	5,974	1.10
Democratic	Bennie J. Smith	5,040	0.93
Democratic	Jimmy Ausbrooks (withdrawn)	3,629	0.67
Democratic	Eric Rothmuller	2,995	0.55
Democratic	John R. Sharpensteen	2,992	0.55
Total votes		544,062	100.00

Kentucky general election
Party	Candidate	Votes	%	±%
Republican	Mitch McConnell (incumbent)	1,233,315	57.76%	+1.57
Democratic	Amy McGrath	816,257	38.23%	–2.49
Libertarian	Brad Barron	85,386	4.00%	+0.92
Write-in		99	0.01%	±0.00
Total votes		2,135,057	100.00%	
Republican hold				

== Louisiana ==
Louisiana election
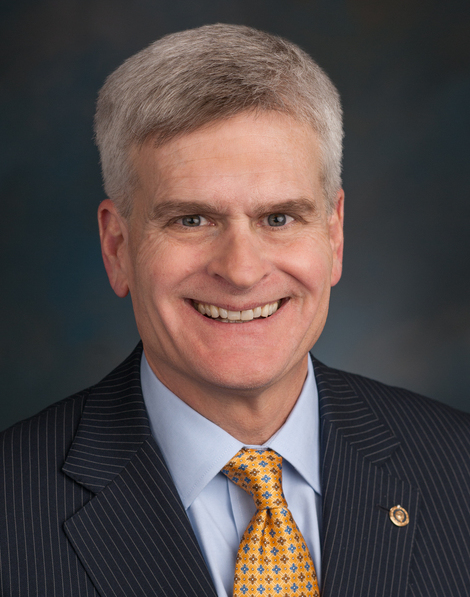

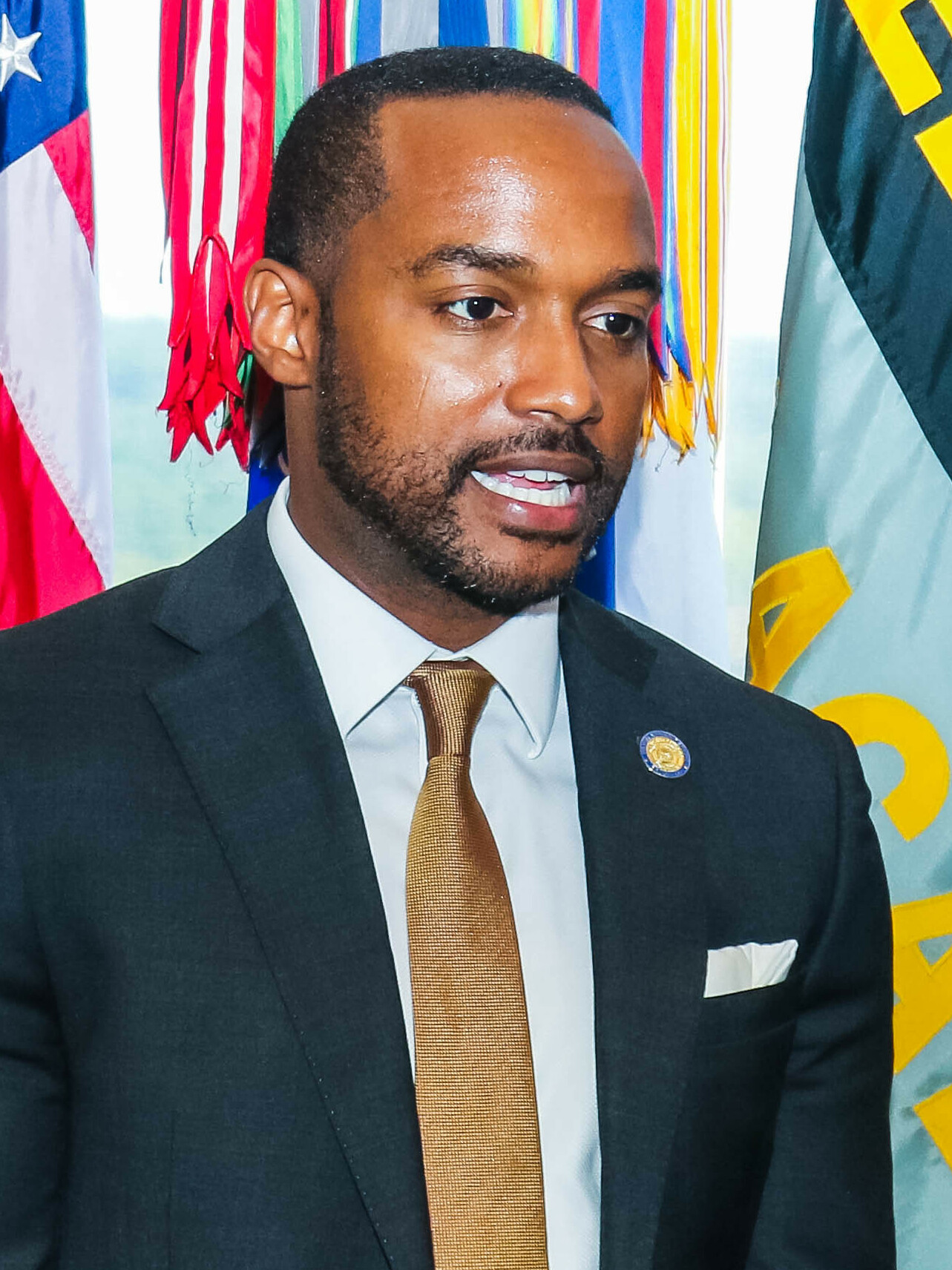

Nominee	Bill Cassidy	Adrian Perkins	Derrick Edwards
Party	Republican	Democratic	Democratic
Popular vote	1,228,908	394,049	229,814
Percentage	59.3%	19.0%	11.1%
- Parish results Cassidy: 30–40% 40–50% 50–60% 60–70% 70–80% 80–90% Perkins: 40–50%
U.S. senator before election
Bill Cassidy
Republican
Elected U.S. senator
Bill Cassidy
Republican

Republican Bill Cassidy won a second term in office, defeating Democrat Adrian Perkins and others.

A Louisiana primary (a form of jungle primary) was held on November 3. Had no candidate won a majority of the vote in the primary, a run-off election would have been held, but Cassidy won in the first round.

Louisiana blanket primary
Party	Candidate	Votes	%
Republican	Bill Cassidy (incumbent)	1,228,908	59.32
Democratic	Adrian Perkins	394,049	19.02
Democratic	Derrick Edwards	229,814	11.09
Democratic	Antoine Pierce	55,710	2.69
Republican	Dustin Murphy	38,383	1.85
Democratic	Drew Knight	36,962	1.78
Independent	Beryl Billiot	17,362	0.84
Independent	John Paul Bourgeois	16,518	0.80
Democratic	Peter Wenstrup	14,454	0.70
Libertarian	Aaron Sigler	11,321	0.55
Independent	M.V. "Vinny" Mendoza	7,811	0.38
Independent	Melinda Mary Price	7,680	0.37
Independent	Jamar Montgomery	5,804	0.28
Independent	Reno Jean Daret III	3,954	0.19
Independent	Alexander "Xan" John	2,813	0.14
Total votes		2,071,543	100.00
Republican hold			

== Maine ==
Maine election
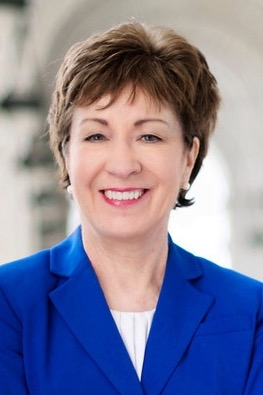

Nominee	Susan Collins	Sara Gideon
Party	Republican	Democratic
Popular vote	417,645 (Note: Maine uses ranked-choice voting; results shown are first-choice votes.)	347,223
Percentage	50.98%	42.39%
- Collins: 40–50% 50–60% 60–70% 70–80% 80–90% >90% Gideon: 40–50% 50–60% 60–70% 70–80% Tie
U.S. senator before election
Susan Collins
Republican
Elected U.S. senator
Susan Collins
Republican

Republican Susan Collins won a fifth term in office, defeating Speaker of the Maine House of Representatives Sara Gideon.

Gideon consistently led Collins in polls for almost the entire election cycle. Collins is considered one of the most moderate Republicans in the Senate and had never faced a competitive re-election campaign, even though Maine leans Democratic. But she faced growing unpopularity due to her increasingly conservative voting record, and her votes to confirm Brett Kavanaugh to the Supreme Court and to acquit Trump in his impeachment trial. Despite almost all polling and Gideon's formidable funding, Collins was re-elected by a surprising 8.6-point margin.

Educator and activist Lisa Savage also ran as a candidate for the Green party.

Maine Republican primary
Party	Candidate	Votes	%
Republican	Susan Collins (incumbent)	87,375	98.79
Write-in		1,073	1.21
Total votes		88,448	100.00

Maine Democratic primary
Party	Candidate	Votes	%
Democratic	Sara Gideon	116,264	71.47
Democratic	Betsy Sweet	37,327	22.94
Democratic	Bre Kidman	9,090	5.59
Total votes		162,681	100.00

Maine general election
Party	Candidate	Votes	%	±%
Republican	Susan Collins (incumbent)	417,645	50.98%	–17.48
Democratic	Sara Gideon	347,223	42.39%	+10.89
Independent	Lisa Savage	40,579	4.95%	N/A
Independent	Max Linn	13,508	1.65%	N/A
Write-in		228	0.03%	–0.01
Total votes		819,183	100.00%	
Republican hold				

== Massachusetts ==
Massachusetts election
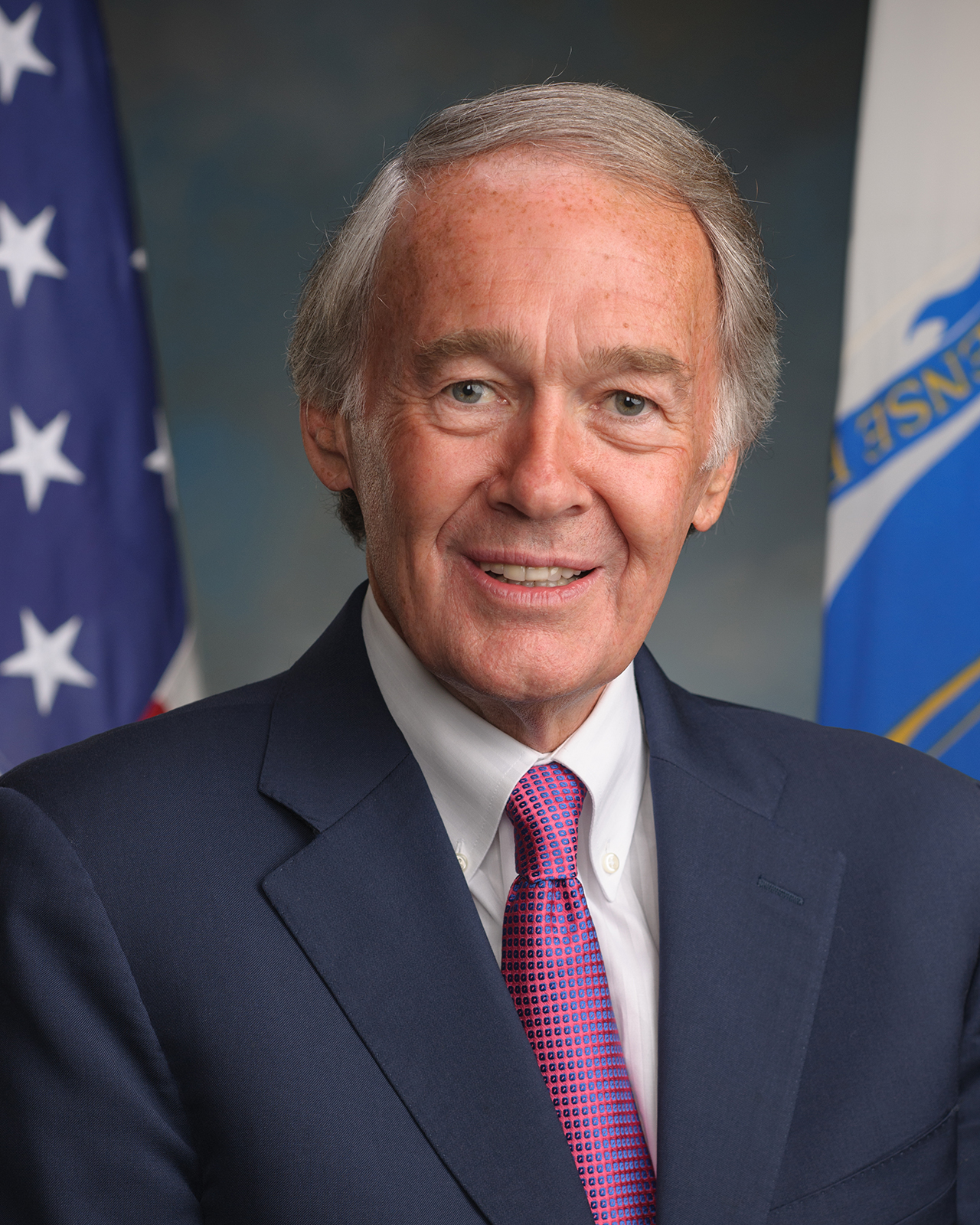

Nominee	Ed Markey	Kevin O'Connor
Party	Democratic	Republican
Popular vote	2,357,809	1,177,765
Percentage	66.15%	33.05%
- Markey: 40–50% 50–60% 60–70% 70–80% 80–90% >90% O'Connor: 40–50% 50–60% 60–70% Tie: 40–50%
U.S. senator before election
Ed Markey
Democratic
Elected U.S. senator
Ed Markey
Democratic

Democrat Ed Markey was re-elected in 2014, having won a 2013 special election to replace long-time incumbent John Kerry, who resigned to become U.S. secretary of state. He easily won a second full term in 2020, defeating Republican Kevin O'Connor by more than 33 percentage points.

Markey fended off a primary challenge from Joe Kennedy III, four-term U.S. representative for Massachusetts's Fourth District and grandson of former U.S. senator and U.S. attorney general Robert F. Kennedy. This marked the first time a member of the Kennedy family lost an election in Massachusetts.

O'Connor defeated Shiva Ayyadurai, a former independent senate candidate, in the Republican primary.

On August 24, 2020, perennial candidate Vermin Supreme launched a write-in campaign for the Libertarian nomination, but received too few votes to qualify for the general election ballot.

Massachusetts Democratic primary
Party	Candidate	Votes	%
Democratic	Ed Markey (incumbent)	782,694	55.35
Democratic	Joe Kennedy III	629,359	44.51
Write-in		1,935	0.14
Total votes		1,413,988	100.00

Massachusetts Republican primary
Party	Candidate	Votes	%
Republican	Kevin O'Connor	158,590	59.71
Republican	Shiva Ayyadurai	104,782	39.45
Write-in		2,245	0.84
Total votes		265,617	100.00

Massachusetts general election
Party	Candidate	Votes	%	±%
Democratic	Ed Markey (incumbent)	2,357,809	66.15%	+4.28
Republican	Kevin O'Connor	1,177,765	33.05%	–4.93
Write-in	Shiva Ayyadurai	21,134	0.59%	N/A
Write-in		7,428	0.21%	+0.06
Total votes		3,564,136	100.00%	
Democratic hold				

== Michigan ==
Michigan election
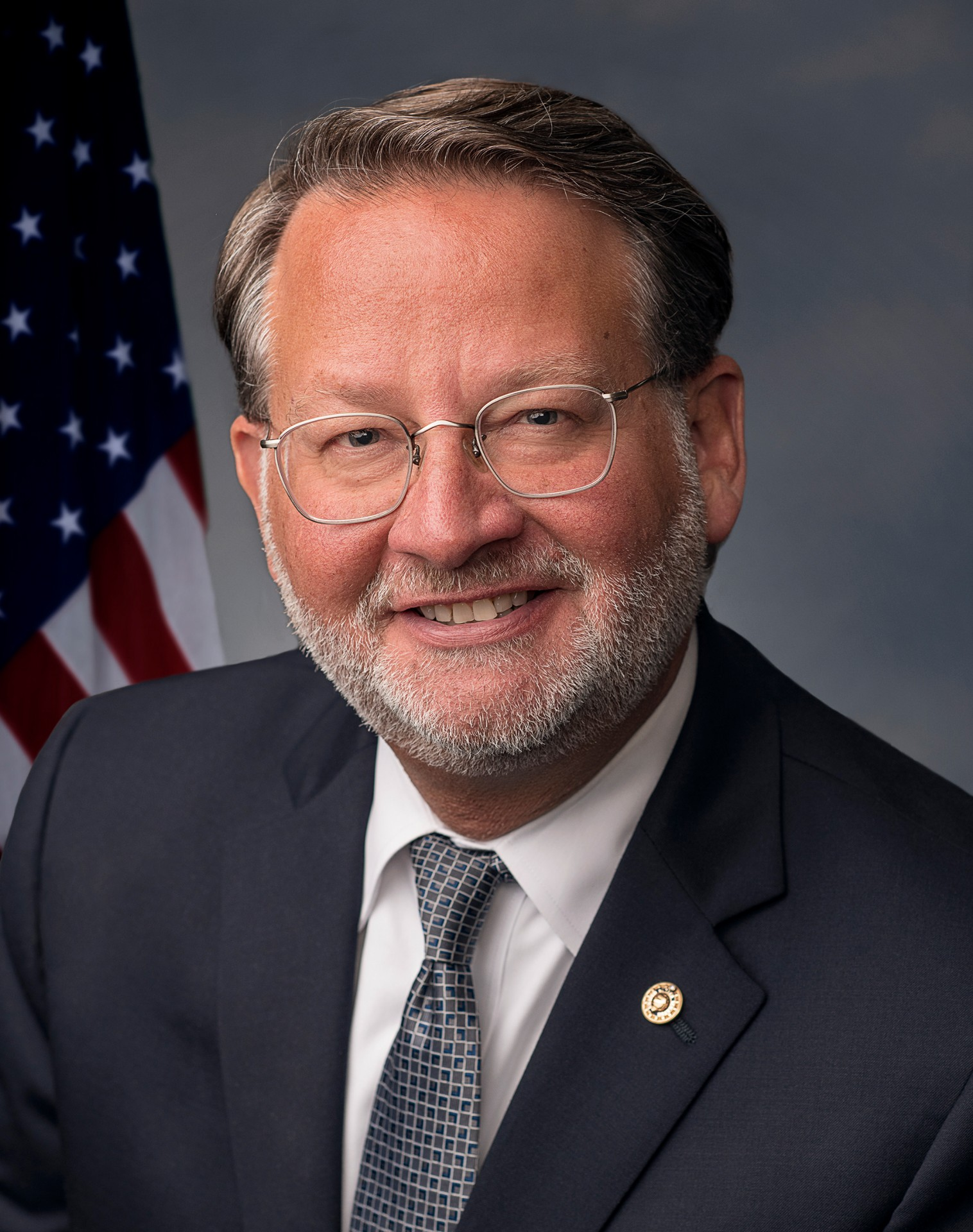

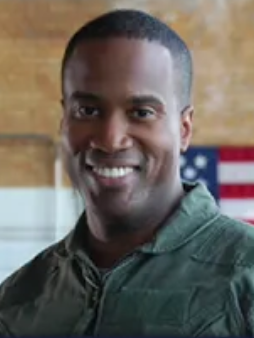
Nominee	Gary Peters	John James
Party	Democratic	Republican
Popular vote	2,734,568	2,642,233
Percentage	49.9%	48.2%
- County results Peters: 40–50% 50–60% 60–70% 70–80% James: 40–50% 50–60% 60–70% 70–80%
U.S. senator before election
Gary Peters
Democratic
Elected U.S. senator
Gary Peters
Democratic

Democrat Gary Peters narrowly won a second term in office, defeating Republican John James.

James won a Republican Michigan Senate nomination for his second time, having run against incumbent Democrat Debbie Stabenow in 2018 for Michigan's other senate seat. He faced only token opposition for the 2020 Republican nomination, running against perennial candidate Bob Carr.

Michigan Democratic primary
Party	Candidate	Votes	%
Democratic	Gary Peters (incumbent)	1,180,780	100.00
Total votes		1,180,780	100.00

Michigan Republican primary
Party	Candidate	Votes	%
Republican	John E. James	1,005,315	100.00
Total votes		1,005,315	100.00

Michigan general election
Party	Candidate	Votes	%	±%
Democratic	Gary Peters (incumbent)	2,734,568	49.90%	–4.71
Republican	John E. James	2,642,233	48.22%	+6.89
U.S. Taxpayers'	Valerie Willis	50,597	0.92%	–0.28
Green	Marcia Squier	39,217	0.72%	–0.12
Natural Law	Doug Dern	13,093	0.24%	N/A
Write-in		12	0.00%	±0.00
Total votes		5,479,720	100.00%	
Democratic hold				

== Minnesota ==
Minnesota election
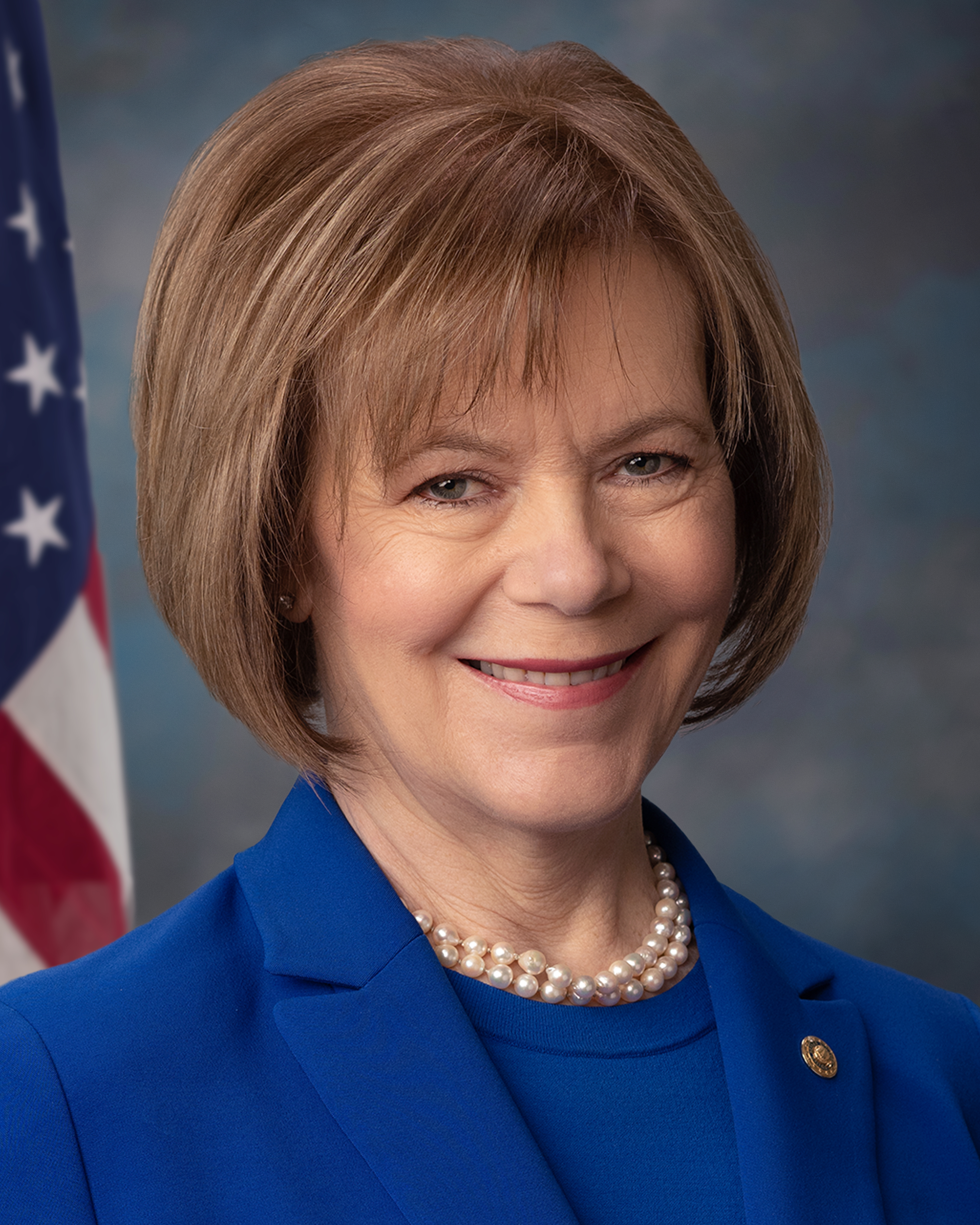

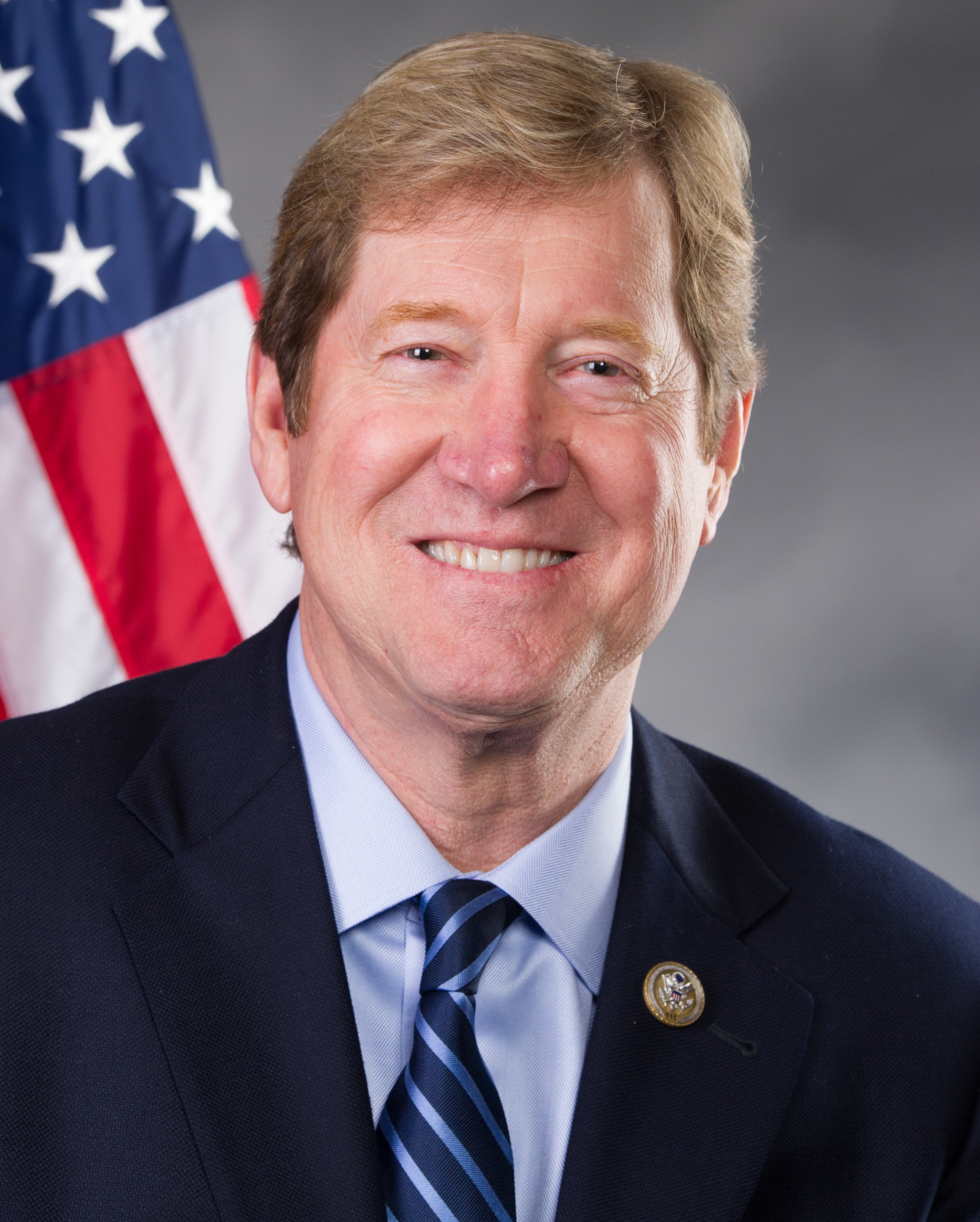

Nominee	Tina Smith	Jason Lewis	Kevin O'Connor
Party	Democratic (DFL)	Republican	Legal Marijuana Now
Popular vote	1,566,522	1,398,145	190,154
Percentage	48.74%	43.50%	5.91%
- County results Smith: 40–50% 50–60% 60–70% Lewis: 40–50% 50–60% 60–70%
U.S. senator before election
Tina Smith
Democratic (DFL)
Elected U.S. senator
Tina Smith
Democratic (DFL)

Incumbent Democrat Tina Smith was appointed to the U.S. Senate to replace Al Franken in 2018 after serving as lieutenant governor, and won a special election later in 2018 to serve the remainder of Franken's term. She defeated Republican Jason Lewis, winning her first full term in office.

Minnesota Democratic (DFL) primary
Party	Candidate	Votes	%
Democratic (DFL)	Tina Smith (incumbent)	497,498	87.14
Democratic (DFL)	Paula Overby	30,497	5.34
Democratic (DFL)	Ahmad Hassan	20,037	3.51
Democratic (DFL)	Steve Carlson	16,429	2.88
Democratic (DFL)	Christopher Seymore	6,480	1.13
Total votes		570,941	100.00

Minnesota Republican primary
Party	Candidate	Votes	%
Republican	Jason Lewis	191,290	78.11
Republican	Cynthia Gail	17,675	7.22
Republican	John Berman	16,213	6.62
Republican	Bob Carney Jr.	10,503	4.29
Republican	James Reibestein	9,210	3.76
Total votes		244,891	100.00

Minnesota Legal Marijuana Now primary
Party	Candidate	Votes	%
Legal Marijuana Now	Kevin O'Connor	6,996	100.00
Total votes		6,996	100.00

Minnesota general election
Party	Candidate	Votes	%	±%
Democratic (DFL)	Tina Smith (incumbent)	1,566,522	48.74%	−4.23
Republican	Jason Lewis	1,398,145	43.50%	+1.15
Legal Marijuana Now	Kevin O'Connor	190,154	5.91%	+2.21
Grassroots—LC	Oliver Steinberg	57,174	1.78%	N/A
Write-in		2,261	0.07%	+0.03
Total votes		3,214,256	100.00%	
Democratic (DFL) hold				

== Mississippi ==
Mississippi election

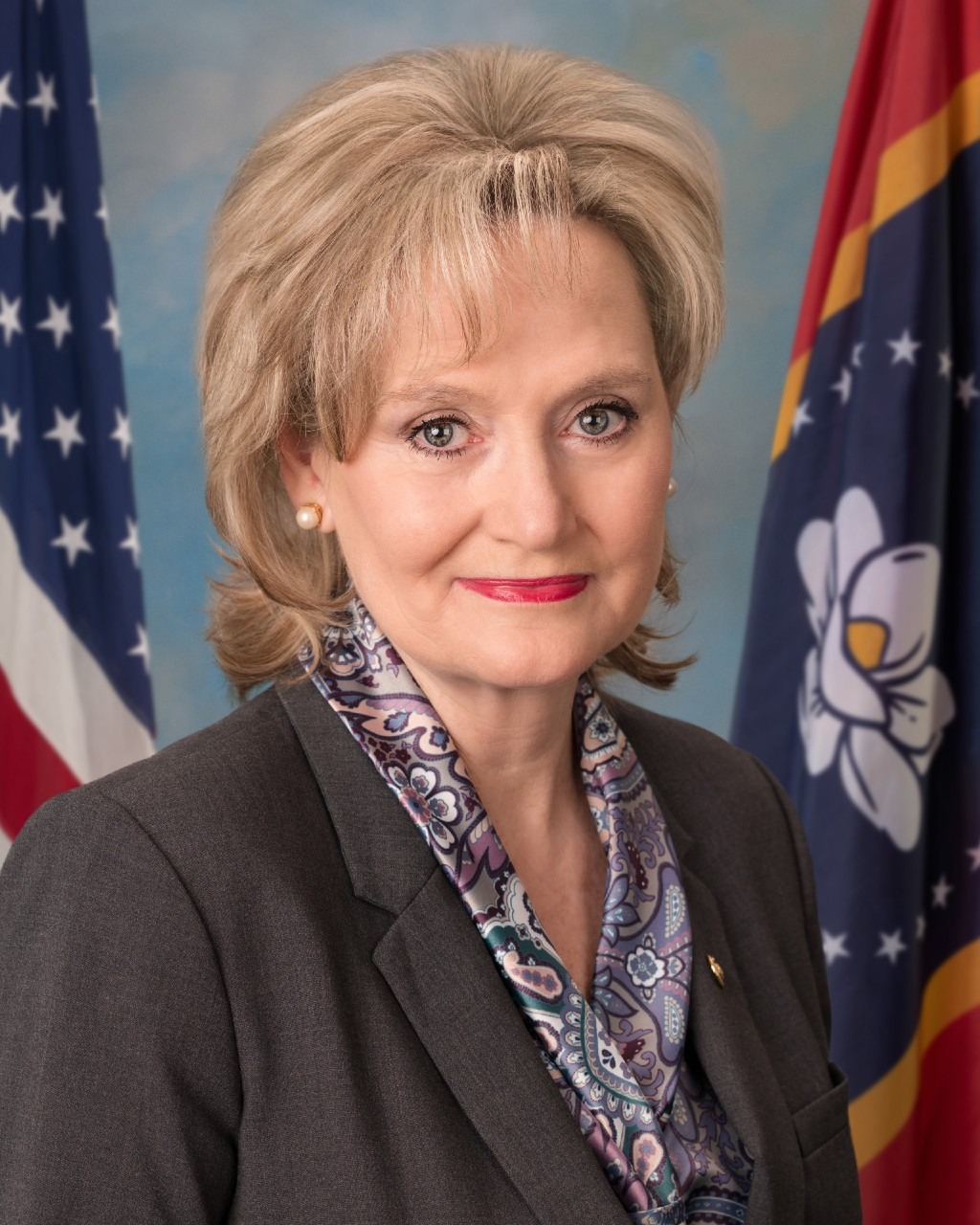

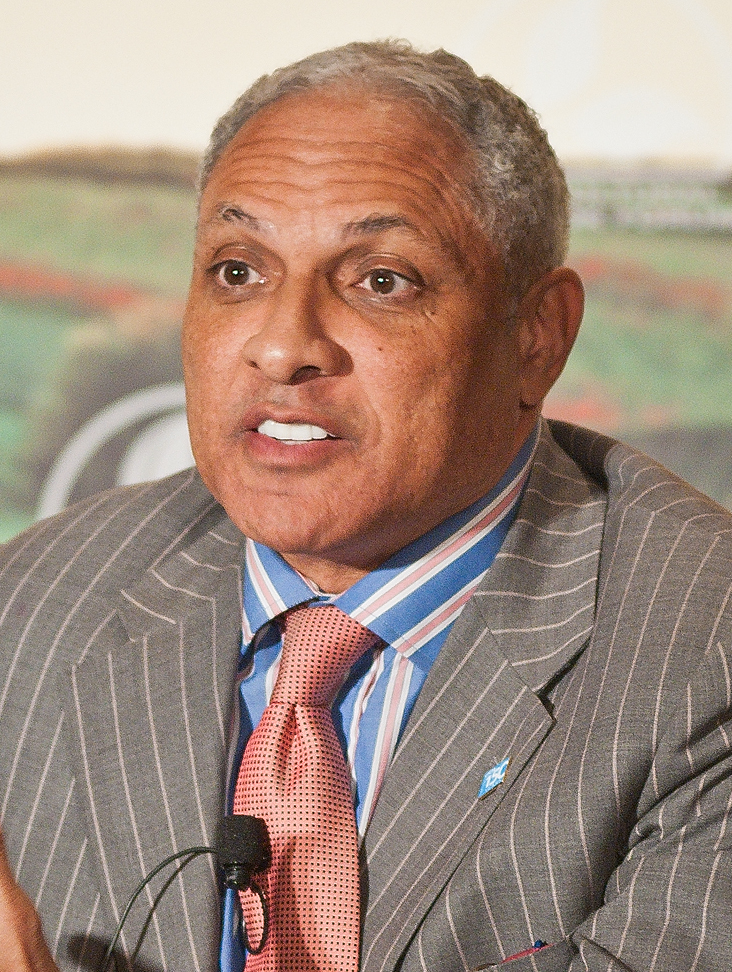
Nominee	Cindy Hyde-Smith	Mike Espy
Party	Republican	Democratic
Popular vote	709,539	578,806
Percentage	54.10%	44.13%
- County results Hyde-Smith: 50–60% 60–70% 70–80% 80-90% Espy: 50–60% 60–70% 70–80% 80–90%
U.S. senator before election
Cindy Hyde-Smith
Republican
Elected U.S. senator
Cindy Hyde-Smith
Republican

Incumbent Republican Cindy Hyde-Smith won her first full term in office, defeating Democrat and former U.S. secretary of agriculture Mike Espy by 10 percentage points. This race was an exact rematch of the 2018 Mississippi Senate special election, in which Hyde-Smith defeated Espy for the remaining two years of the seat's term.

Libertarian candidate Jimmy Edwards also made the general election ballot.

Mississippi Republican primary
Party	Candidate	Votes	%
Republican	Cindy Hyde-Smith (incumbent)	235,463	100.00
Total votes		235,463	100.00

Democratic primary results
Party	Candidate	Votes	%
Democratic	Mike Espy	250,496	93.12
Democratic	Tobey Bartee	11,148	4.14
Democratic	Jensen Bohren	7,345	2.74
Total votes		268,989	100.00

Mississippi general election
Party	Candidate	Votes	%	±%
Republican	Cindy Hyde-Smith (incumbent)	709,539	54.10%	+0.47
Democratic	Mike Espy	578,806	44.13%	–2.24
Libertarian	Jimmy Edwards	23,152	1.77%	N/A
Total votes		1,311,497	100.00%	
Republican hold				

== Montana ==
Montana election
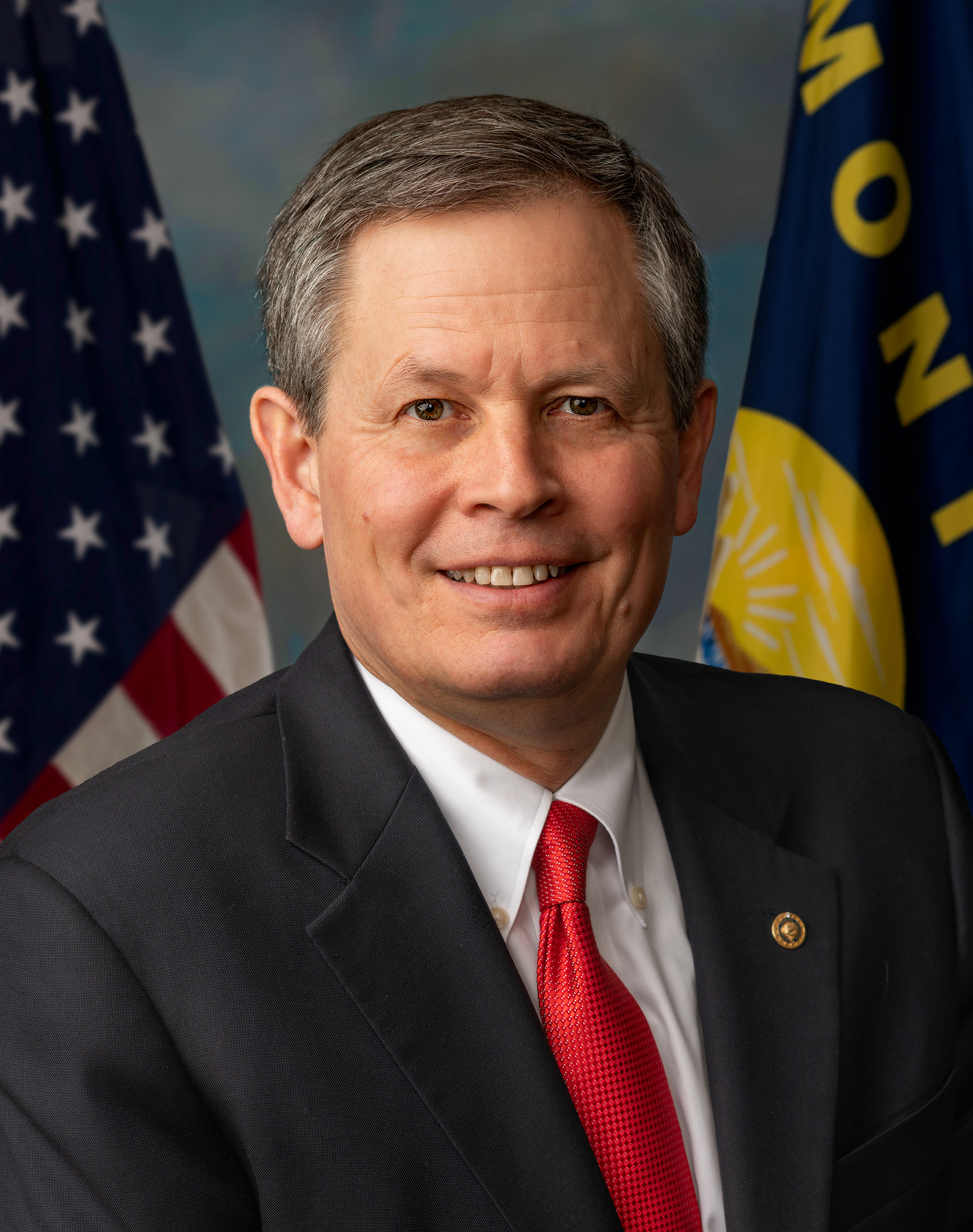

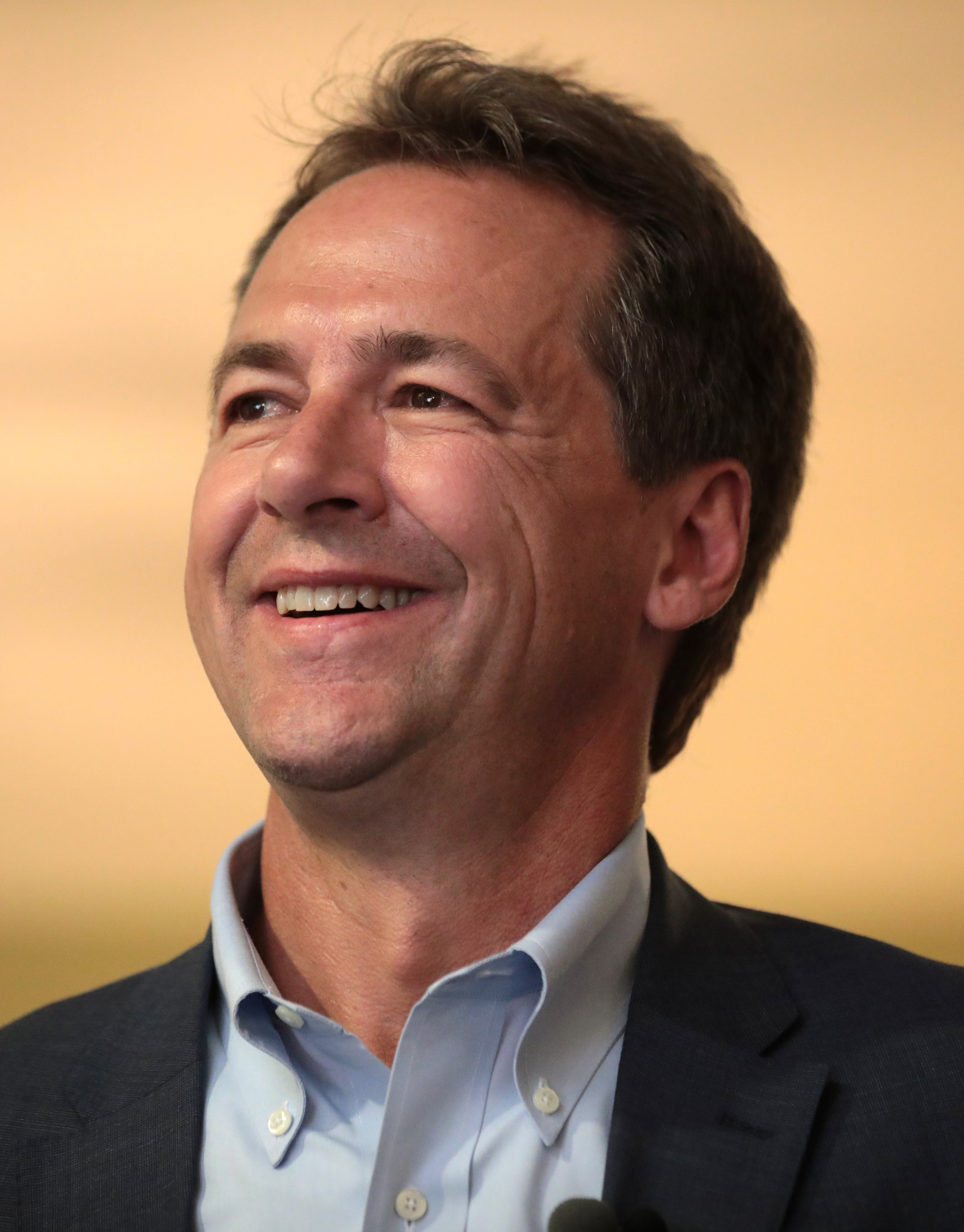
Nominee	Steve Daines	Steve Bullock
Party	Republican	Democratic
Popular vote	333,174	272,463
Percentage	55.01%	44.99%
- County results Daines: 50–60% 60–70% 70–80% 80–90% >90% Bullock: 50–60% 60–70% 70–80%
U.S. senator before election
Steve Daines
Republican
Elected U.S. senator
Steve Daines
Republican

Republican Steve Daines won a second term in office, defeating the Democratic nominee, Montana Governor Steve Bullock.

Daines was opposed (before his nomination) in the Republican primary by hardware store manager Daniel Larson and former Democratic speaker of the Montana House of Representatives John Driscoll, who changed parties in 2020.

Bullock won the Democratic nomination, defeating nuclear engineer and U.S. Navy veteran John Mues.

Libertarian and Green party candidates were set to appear on the general election ballot, but the Libertarians refused to nominate a replacement after their nominee withdrew and the Greens' nominee was disqualified.

Once Bullock filed his candidacy, the race became seen as highly competitive. Bullock, a popular governor and a moderate, led in many polls in the spring and summer of 2020, and raised more money than Daines. Closer to election day, Bullock slightly trailed in polls, but the election was still seen as relatively competitive. Daines defeated Bullock by a larger-than-expected 10-point margin.

Montana Republican primary
Party	Candidate	Votes	%
Republican	Steve Daines (incumbent)	192,942	88.02
Republican	John Driscoll	13,944	6.36
Republican	Daniel Larson	12,319	5.62
Total votes		219,205	100.00

Montana Democratic primary
Party	Candidate	Votes	%
Democratic	Steve Bullock	144,949	95.45
Democratic	John Mues	3,740	2.46
Democratic	Mike Knoles (withdrawn)	3,165	2.09
Total votes		151,854	100.00

Montana general election
Party	Candidate	Votes	%	±%
Republican	Steve Daines (incumbent)	333,174	55.01%	–2.78
Democratic	Steve Bullock	272,463	44.99%	+4.92
Total votes		605,637	100.00%	
Republican hold				

== Nebraska ==
Nebraska election
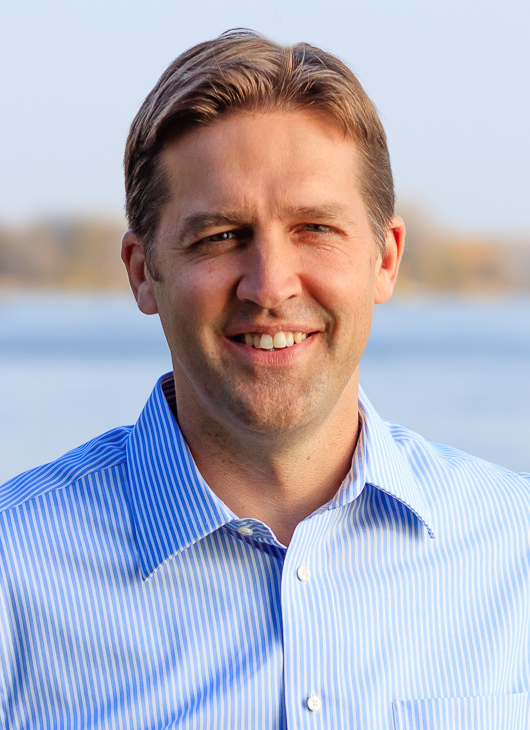

Nominee	Ben Sasse	Chris Janicek
Party	Republican	Democratic
Popular vote	583,507	227,191
Percentage	62.7%	24.4%
Nominee	Preston Love Jr.	Gene Siadek
Party	Write-In	Libertarian
Popular vote	58,411	55,115
Percentage	6.3%	5.9%
- County results Sasse: 50–60% 60–70% 70–80% 80–90%
U.S. senator before election
Ben Sasse
Republican
Elected U.S. Senator
Ben Sasse
Republican

Republican Ben Sasse easily won a second term in office, defeating Democrat Chris Janicek by more than 30 percentage points.

Sasse had defeated businessman and former Lancaster County Republican Party chair Matt Innis in the Republican primary with 75.2% of the vote.

Businessman and 2018 U.S. Senate candidate Chris Janicek won the Democratic primary with 30.7% of the vote, defeating six other candidates.

Libertarian candidate Gene Siadek also appeared on the general election ballot.

After the primary election, the Nebraska Democratic party withdrew its support from Janicek when allegations that he sexually harassed a campaign staffer emerged. Janicek refused to leave the race despite the state party endorsing his former primary opponent, which led former Democratic Congressman Brad Ashford to announce a write-in campaign on August 23, 2020. After Janicek vowed to remain in the race anyway, Ashford withdrew on August 27, citing lack of time and resources necessary for a U.S. Senate campaign. The state Democratic Party subsequently threw its support behind long-time Nebraska activist Preston Love Jr., who declared a write-in candidacy for the seat.

Nebraska Republican primary
Party	Candidate	Votes	%
Republican	Ben Sasse (incumbent)	215,207	75.21
Republican	Matt Innis	70,921	24.79
Total votes		284,212	100.00

Nebraska Democratic primary
Party	Candidate	Votes	%
Democratic	Chris Janicek	46,247	30.69
Democratic	Angie Philips	35,929	23.84
Democratic	Alisha Shelton	34,284	22.75
Democratic	Andy Stock	17,156	11.38
Democratic	Larry Marvin	6,868	4.56
Democratic	Daniel Wik	5,765	3.83
Democratic	Dennis Macek	4,453	2.95
Total votes		150,702	100.00

Nebraska general election
Party	Candidate	Votes	%	±%
Republican	Ben Sasse (incumbent)	583,507	62.74%	–1.60
Democratic	Chris Janicek	227,191	24.43%	–7.06
Write-in	Preston Love Jr.	58,411	6.28%	N/A
Libertarian	Gene Siadek	55,115	5.93%	N/A
Write-in		5,788	0.62%	+0.54
Total votes		930,012	100.00%	
Republican hold				

== New Hampshire ==
New Hampshire election
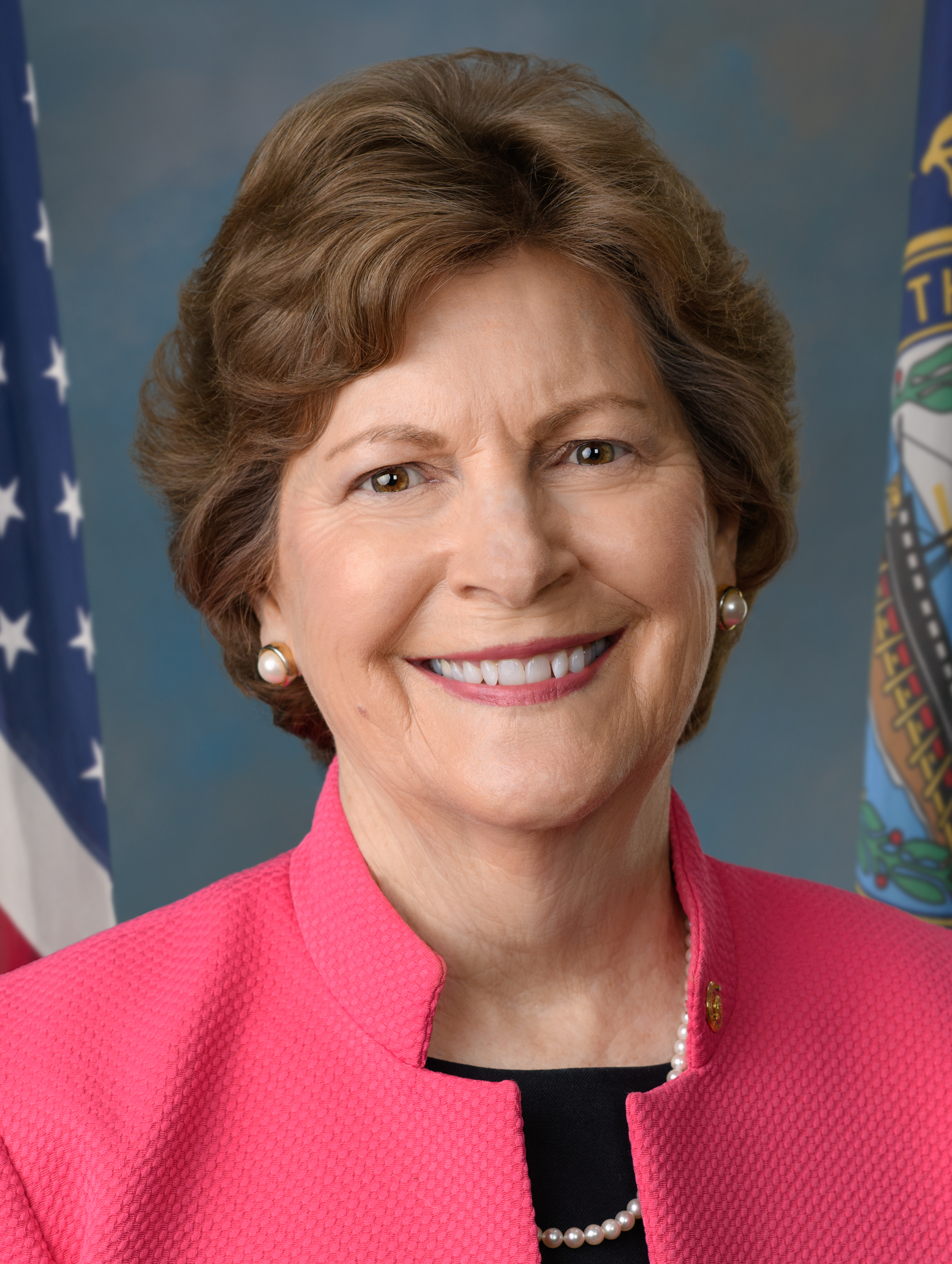

Nominee	Jeanne Shaheen	Corky Messner
Party	Democratic	Republican
Popular vote	450,778	326,229
Percentage	56.63%	40.99%
- Shaheen: 40–50% 50–60% 60–70% 70–80% 80–90% Messner: 40–50% 50–60% 60–70%
U.S. senator before election
Jeanne Shaheen
Democratic
Elected U.S. senator
Jeanne Shaheen
Democratic

Two-term Democrat Jeanne Shaheen won a third term in office by nearly 16 percentage points, defeating Republican Corky Messner.

Messner defeated U.S. Army brigadier general Donald C. Bolduc and perennial candidate Andy Martin for the Republican nomination, winning the nomination on September 8.

Libertarian Justin O'Donnell also appeared on the general election ballot.

New Hampshire Democratic primary
Party	Candidate	Votes	%
Democratic	Jeanne Shaheen (incumbent)	142,012	93.88
Democratic	Paul Krautman	5,914	3.91
Democratic	Tom Alciere	2,992	1.98
Write-in		350	0.23
Total votes		151,268	100.00

New Hampshire Republican primary
Party	Candidate	Votes	%
Republican	Bryant Messner	69,801	50.26
Republican	Donald C. Bolduc	58,749	42.30
Republican	Andy Martin	6,443	4.64
Republican	Gerard Beloin	3,098	2.23
Write-in		785	0.57
Total votes		138,876	100.00

New Hampshire general election
Party	Candidate	Votes	%	±%
Democratic	Jeanne Shaheen (incumbent)	450,771	56.63%	+5.17
Republican	Bryant Messner	326,229	40.99%	–7.22
Libertarian	Justin O'Donnell	18,421	2.32%	N/A
Write-in		486	0.06%	–0.27
Total votes		795,907	100.00%	
Democratic hold				

== New Jersey ==
New Jersey election
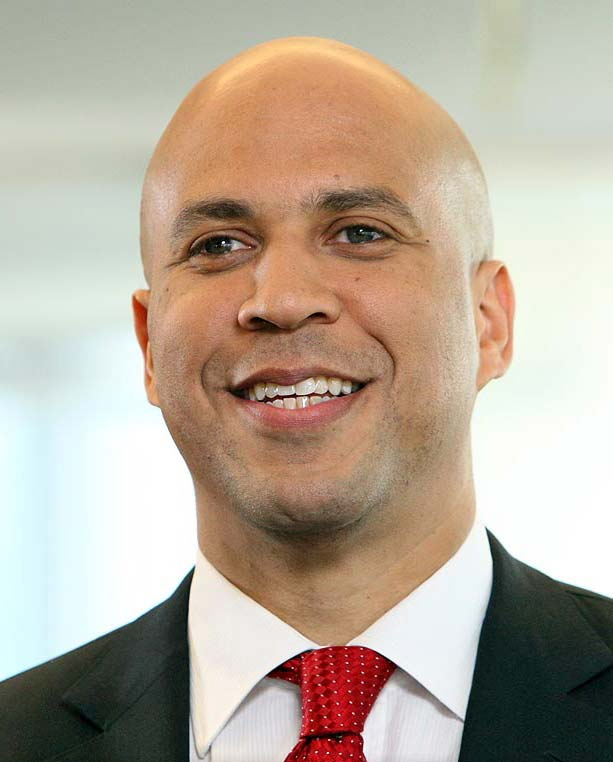

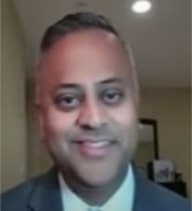
Nominee	Cory Booker	Rik Mehta
Party	Democratic	Republican
Popular vote	2,541,178	1,817,052
Percentage	57.23%	40.92%
- Booker: 40–50% 50–60% 60–70% 70–80% 80–90% >90% Mehta: 40–50% 50–60% 60–70% 70–80%
U.S. senator before election
Cory Booker
Democratic
Elected U.S. senator
Cory Booker
Democratic

Democrat Cory Booker won a second full term in office, having first won his seat in a 2013 special election after serving seven years as the mayor of Newark. He defeated Republican Rick Mehta by a margin of more than 16 percentage points.

Booker had sought his party's nomination for President of the United States in 2020. He suspended his presidential campaign on January 13, 2020, and confirmed his intention to seek a second Senate term.

Attorney Rik Mehta defeated engineer Hirsh Singh, 2018 Independent U.S. Senate candidate Tricia Flanagan, 2018 independent U.S. Senate candidate Natalie Lynn Rivera, and Eugene Anagnos for the Republican nomination.

Green Party candidate Madelyn Hoffman and two independent candidates also appeared on the general election ballot.

New Jersey has not elected a Republican senator since 1972, and all pundits expected Booker to be easily re-elected.

New Jersey Democratic primary
Party	Candidate	Votes	%
Democratic	Cory Booker (incumbent)	838,110	87.58
Democratic	Lawrence Hamm	118,802	12.42
Total votes		956,912	100.00

New Jersey Republican primary
Party	Candidate	Votes	%
Republican	Rik Mehta	154,817	38.01
Republican	Hirsh Singh	146,133	35.88
Republican	Tricia Flanagan	72,678	17.84
Republican	Natalie Lynn Rivera	21,650	5.31
Republican	Eugene Anagnos	12,047	2.96
Total votes		407,325	100.00

New Jersey general election
Party	Candidate	Votes	%	±%
Democratic	Cory Booker (incumbent)	2,541,178	57.23%	+1.39
Republican	Rikin Mehta	1,817,052	40.92%	–1.41
Green	Madelyn Hoffman	38,288	0.86%	N/A
Independent	Veronica Fernandez	32,290	0.73%	N/A
Independent	Daniel Burke	11,632	0.26%	N/A
Total votes		4,440,440	100.00%	
Democratic hold				

== New Mexico ==
New Mexico election
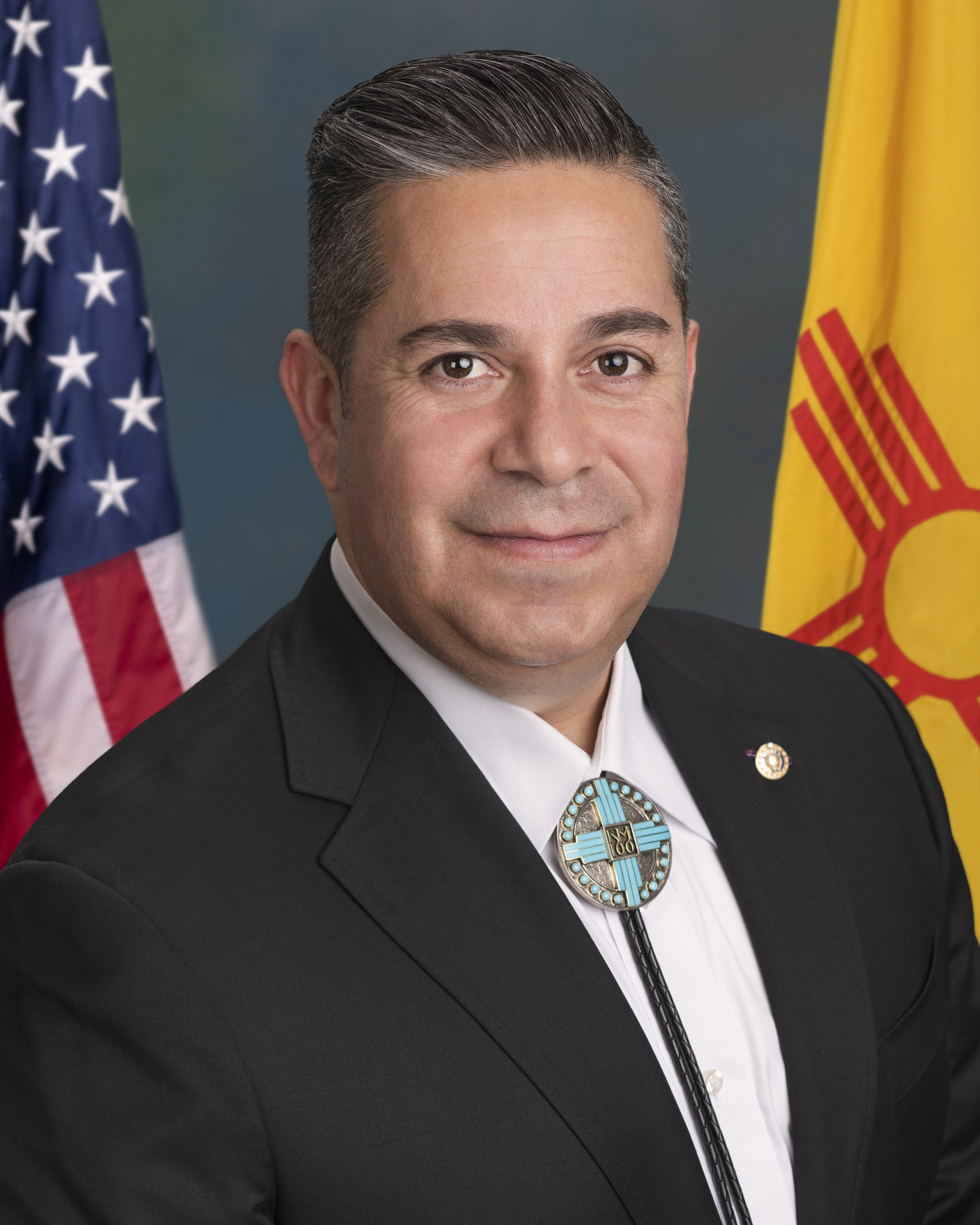

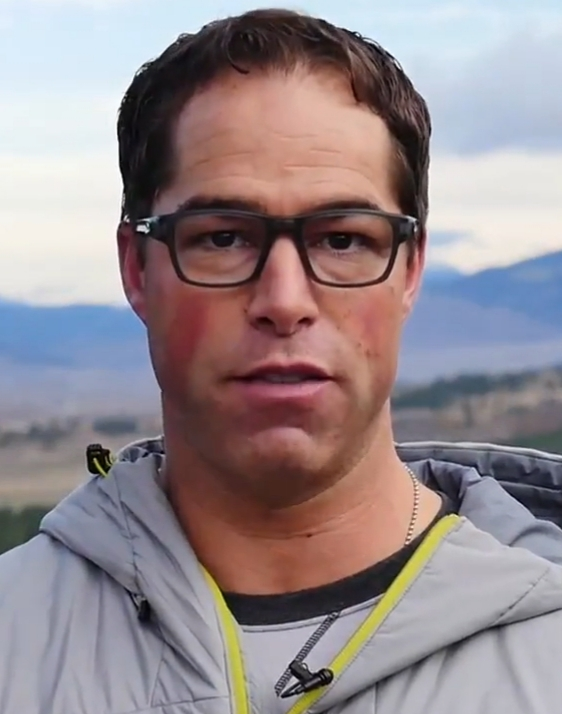
Nominee	Ben Ray Luján	Mark Ronchetti
Party	Democratic	Republican
Popular vote	474,483	418,483
Percentage	51.73%	45.62%
- County results Luján: 40–50% 50–60% 60–70% 70–80% Ronchetti: 50–60% 60–70% 70–80%
U.S. senator before election
Tom Udall
Democratic
Elected U.S. senator
Ben Ray Luján
Democratic

Two-term Democrat Tom Udall was the only incumbent Democratic U.S. senator retiring in 2020. Democratic U.S. representative Ben Ray Luján defeated Republican Mark Ronchetti by 6 percentage points.

Luján won the Democratic nomination without serious opposition.

Ronchetti, the former KRQE chief meteorologist, defeated former U.S. Interior Department official Gavin Clarkson and executive director for the New Mexico Alliance for Life Elisa Martinez in the primary.

Libertarian Bob Walsh also appeared on the general election ballot.

New Mexico Democratic primary
Party	Candidate	Votes	%
Democratic	Ben Ray Luján	225,082	100.00
Total votes		225,082	100.00

New Mexico Republican primary
Party	Candidate	Votes	%
Republican	Mark Ronchetti	89,216	56.49
Republican	Elisa Martinez	41,240	26.11
Republican	Gavin Clarkson	27,471	17.39
Total votes		157,927	100.00

New Mexico general election
Party	Candidate	Votes	%	±%
Democratic	Ben Ray Luján	474,483	51.73%	–3.83
Republican	Mark Ronchetti	418,483	45.62%	+1.18
Libertarian	Bob Walsh	24,271	2.65%	N/A
Total votes		917,237	100.00%	
Democratic hold				

== North Carolina ==
North Carolina election
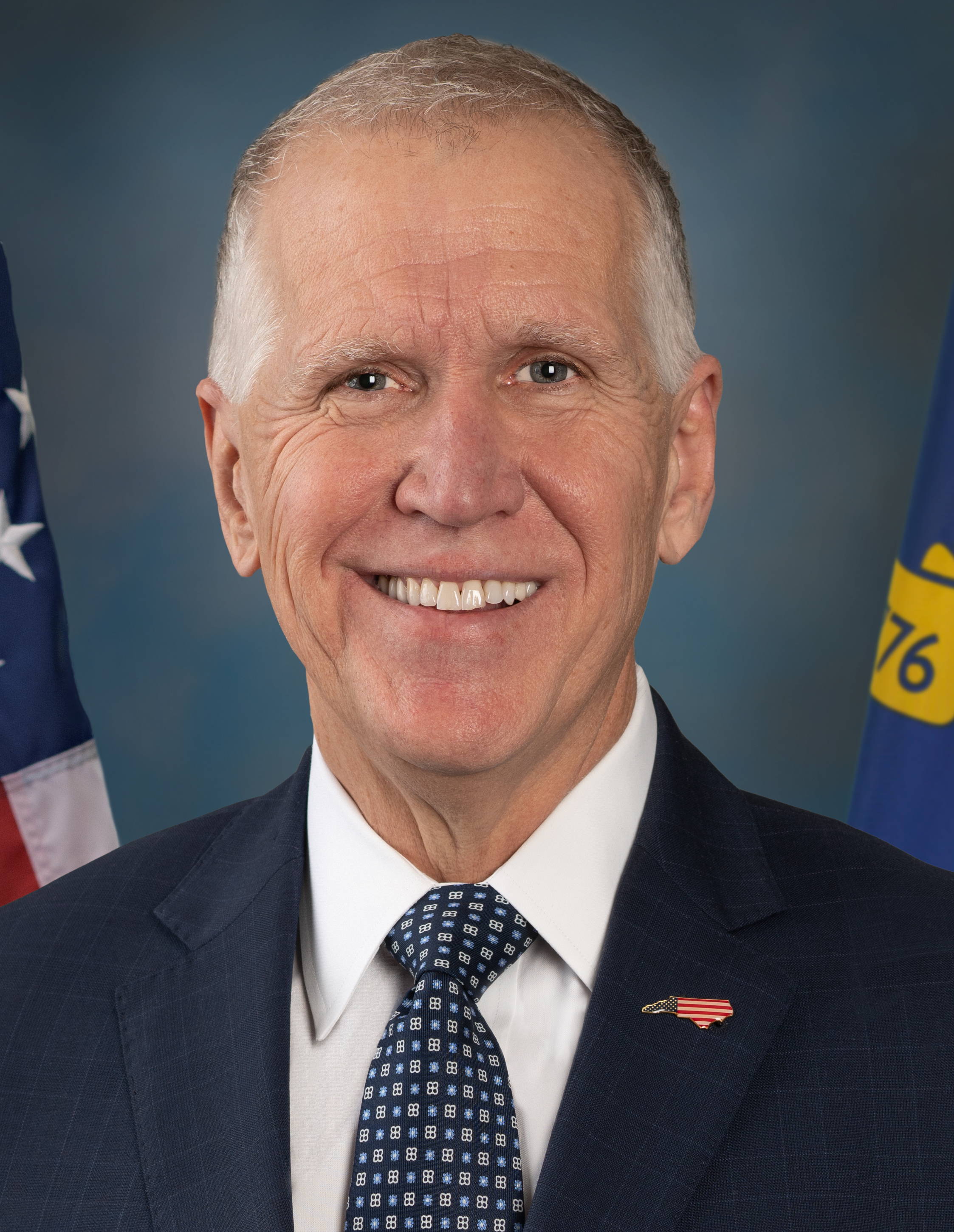

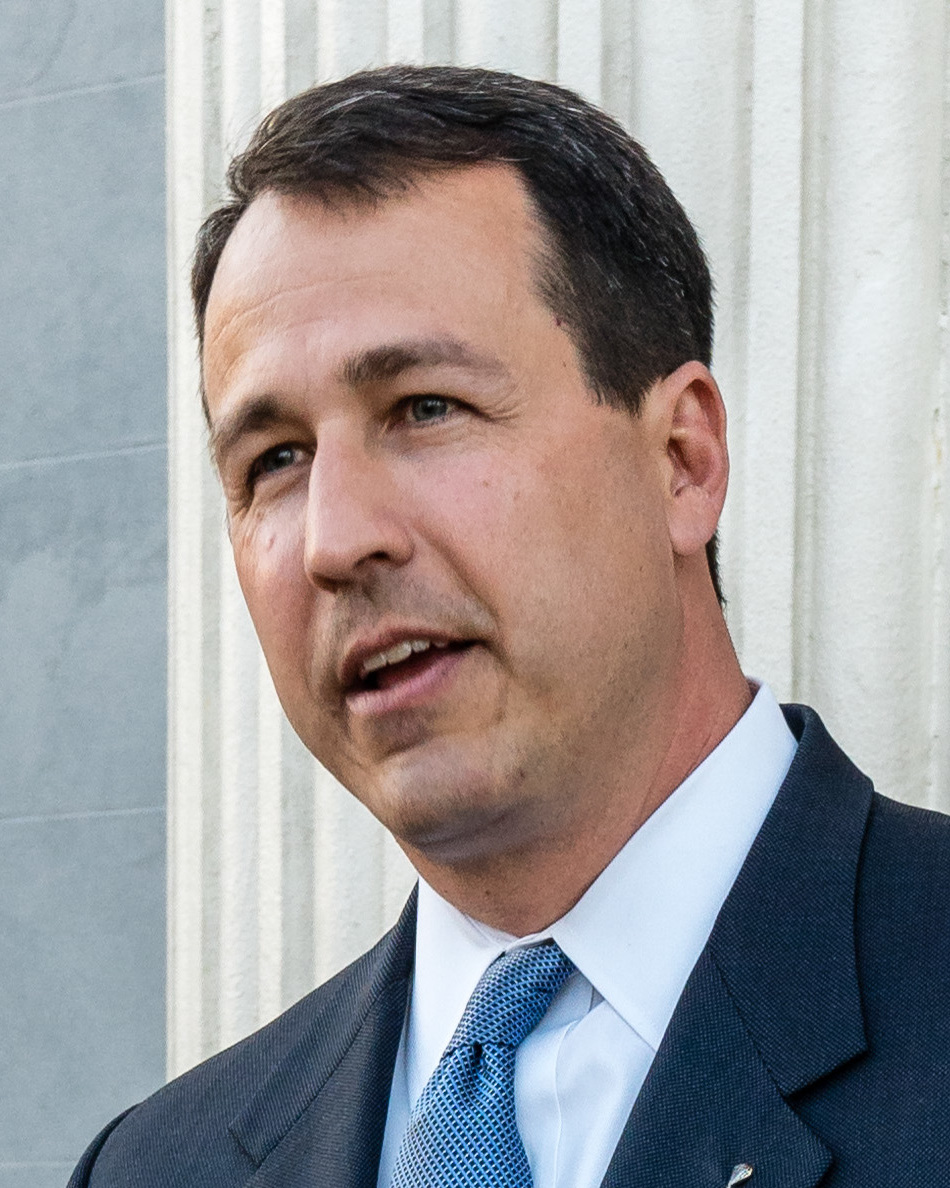
Nominee	Thom Tillis	Cal Cunningham
Party	Republican	Democratic
Popular vote	2,665,598	2,569,965
Percentage	48.69%	46.94%
- County results Tillis: 40–50% 50–60% 60–70% 70–80% Cunningham: 40–50% 50–60% 60–70% 70–80%
U.S. senator before election
Thom Tillis
Republican
Elected U.S. senator
Thom Tillis
Republican

Republican Thom Tillis won a second term in office, defeating Democratic former state senator Cal Cunningham.

Cunningham defeated state senator Erica D. Smith and Mecklenburg County commissioner Trevor Fuller for the Democratic nomination. Tillis defeated three opponents.

The Libertarian Party and the Constitution Party had candidates on the general election ballot.

Despite having grown unpopular among both centrist and conservative Republicans due to his inconsistent support of Trump, and trailing narrowly in polls for almost the entire cycle, Tillis won re-election by nearly 2 points.

North Carolina Republican primary
Party	Candidate	Votes	%
Republican	Thom Tillis (incumbent)	608,943	78.08
Republican	Paul Wright	58,908	7.55
Republican	Larry Holmquist	57,356	7.35
Republican	Sharon Y. Hudson	54,651	7.01
Total votes		779,858	100.00

North Carolina Democratic primary
Party	Candidate	Votes	%
Democratic	Cal Cunningham	717,941	56.93
Democratic	Erica D. Smith	438,969	34.81
Democratic	Trevor M. Fuller	48,168	3.82
Democratic	Steve Swenson	33,741	2.68
Democratic	Atul Goel	22,226	1.76
Total votes		1,261,045	100.00

North Carolina general election
Party	Candidate	Votes	%	±%
Republican	Thom Tillis (incumbent)	2,665,598	48.69%	–0.13
Democratic	Cal Cunningham	2,569,965	46.94%	–0.32
Libertarian	Shannon Bray	171,571	3.13%	–0.61
Constitution	Kevin E. Hayes	67,818	1.24%	N/A
Total votes		5,474,952	100.00%	
Republican hold				

== Oklahoma ==
Oklahoma election
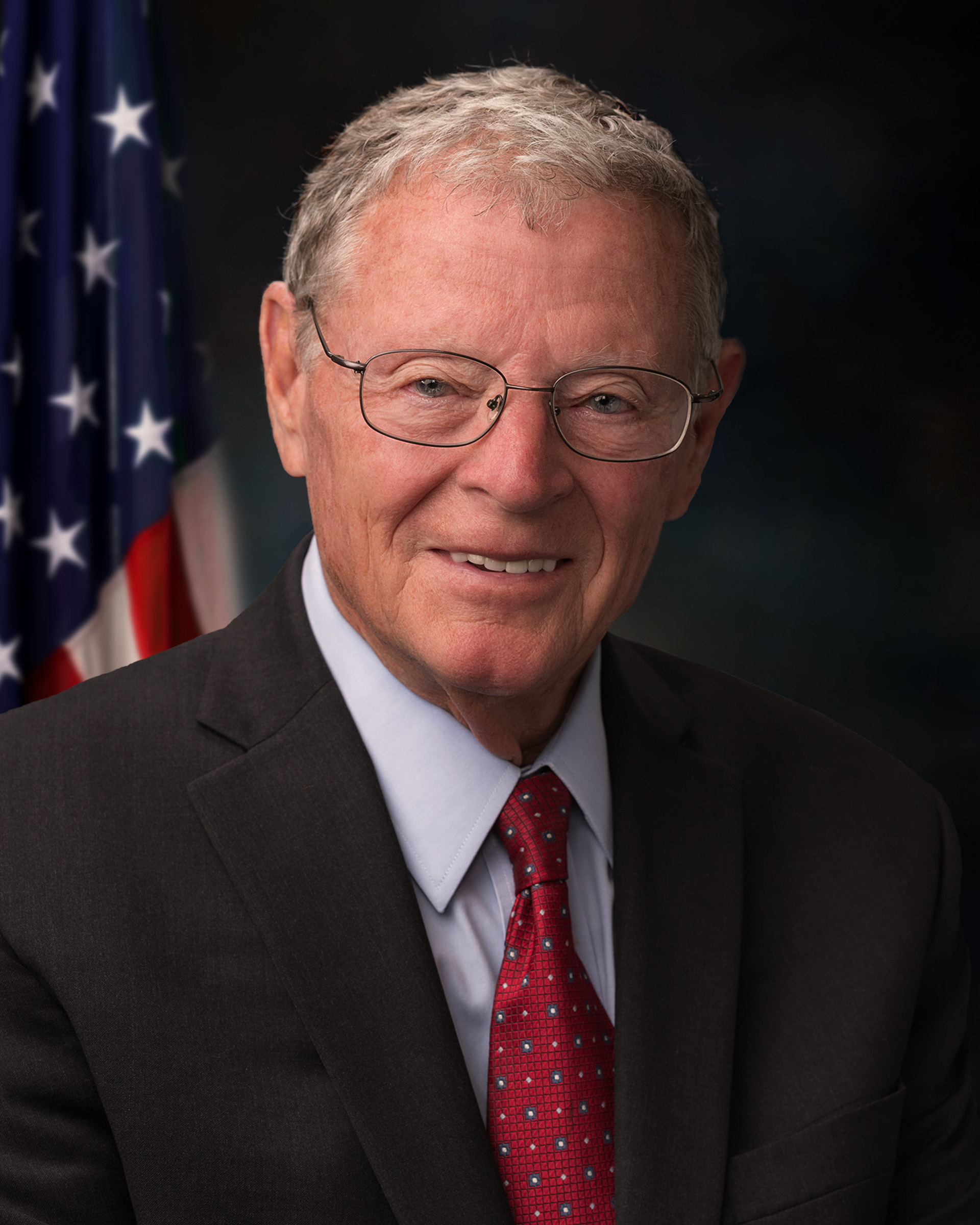

Nominee	Jim Inhofe	Abby Broyles
Party	Republican	Democratic
Popular vote	979,140	509,763
Percentage	62.91%	32.75%
- County results Inhofe: 40–50% 50–60% 60–70% 70–80% 80–90% >90%
U.S. senator before election
Jim Inhofe
Republican
Elected U.S. senator
Jim Inhofe
Republican

Republican Jim Inhofe easily won a fifth term in office, defeating Democrat Abby Broyles by more than 30 percentage points.

Inhofe defeated J.J. Stitt, a farmer and gun shop owner, and Neil Mavis, a former Libertarian Party candidate, for the Republican nomination.

Broyles, an attorney, defeated perennial candidate Sheila Bilyeu and 2018 5th congressional district candidate Elysabeth Britt for the Democratic nomination.

Libertarian candidate Robert Murphy and two Independents also appeared on the general election ballot.

Oklahoma is one of the most solidly Republican states and Inhofe won in a landslide.

Oklahoma Republican primary
Party	Candidate	Votes	%
Republican	Jim Inhofe (incumbent)	277,868	74.05
Republican	J.J. Stitt	57,433	15.31
Republican	John Tompkins	23,563	6.28
Republican	Neil Mavis	16,363	4.36
Total votes		375,227	100.00

Oklahoma Democratic primary
Party	Candidate	Votes	%
Democratic	Abby Broyles	163,921	60.45
Democratic	Elysabeth Britt	45,206	16.67
Democratic	Sheila Bilyeu	32,350	11.93
Democratic	R. O. Joe Cassity, Jr.	29,698	10.95
Total votes		271,175	100.00

Oklahoma general election
Party	Candidate	Votes	%	±%
Republican	Jim Inhofe (incumbent)	979,140	62.91%	–5.10
Democratic	Abby Broyles	509,763	32.75%	+4.20
Libertarian	Robert Murphy	34,435	2.21%	N/A
Independent	Joan Farr	21,652	1.39%	+0.11
Independent	A. D. Nesbit	11,371	0.73%	N/A
Total votes		1,556,361	100.00%	
Republican hold				

== Oregon ==
Oregon election
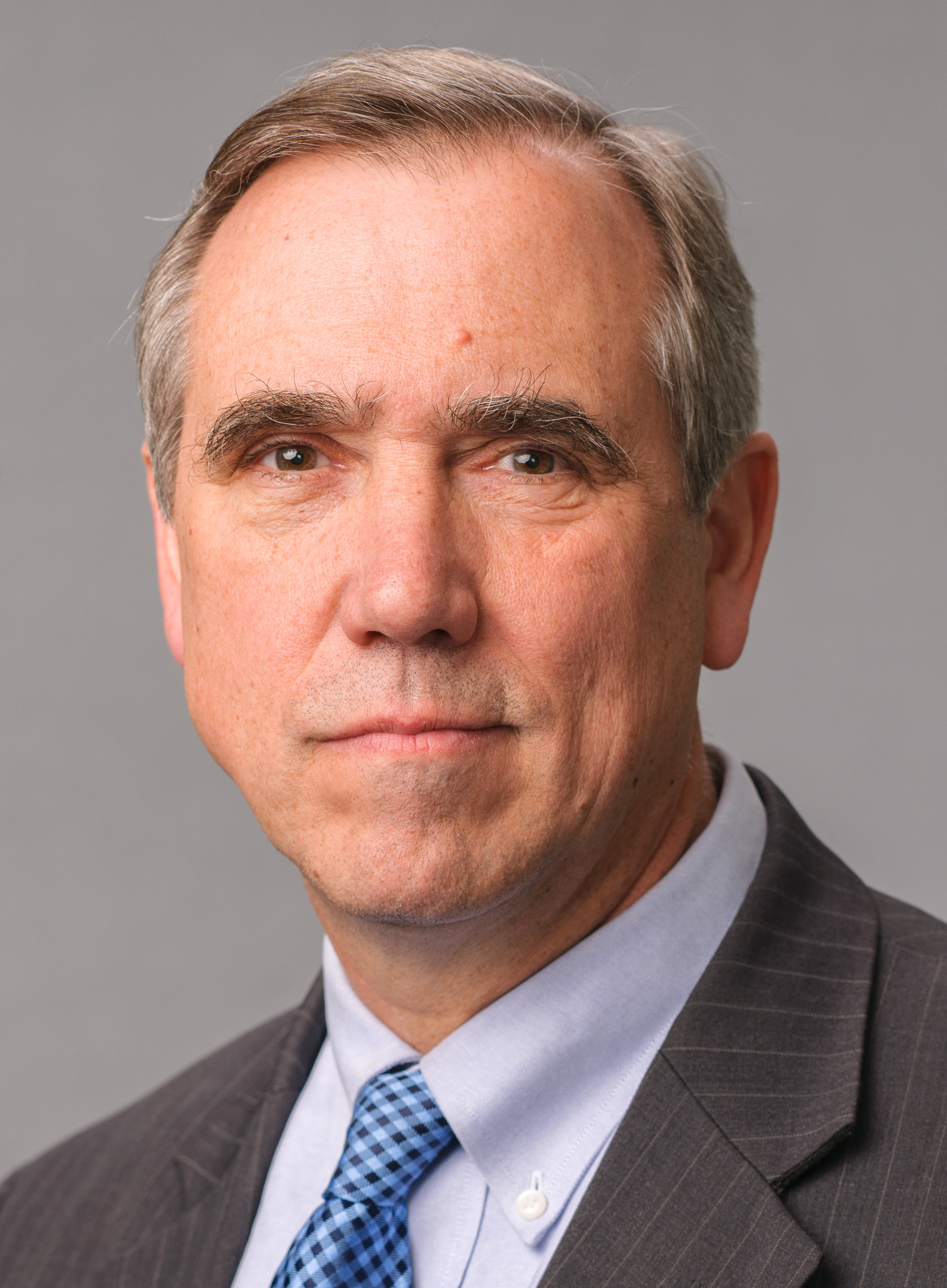

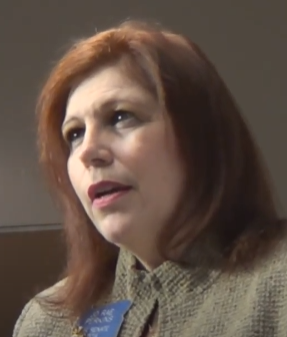
Nominee	Jeff Merkley	Jo Rae Perkins
Party	Democratic	Republican
Popular vote	1,321,047	912,814
Percentage	56.91%	39.32%
- County results Merkley: 40-50% 50-60% 60-70% 70-80% Perkins: 40-50% 50-60% 60-70% 70-80%
U.S. senator before election
Jeff Merkley
Democratic
Elected U.S. senator
Jeff Merkley
Democratic

Democrat Jeff Merkley won a third term in office, defeating Republican Jo Rae Perkins by more than 17 percentage points. Merkley also received the Oregon Independent Party and the Working Families Party nominations.

Perkins, a 2014 U.S. Senate and 2018 U.S. House candidate, defeated three other candidates in the Republican primary with 49.29% of the vote. She is a supporter of QAnon.

Ibrahim Taher was also on the general election ballot, representing the Pacific Green Party and the Oregon Progressive Party. Gary Dye represented the Libertarian Party.

Oregon Democratic primary
Party	Candidate	Votes	%
Democratic	Jeff Merkley (incumbent)	564,878	98.71
Write-in		7,386	1.29
Total votes		572,264	100.00

Oregon Republican primary
Party	Candidate	Votes	%
Republican	Jo Rae Perkins	178,004	49.23
Republican	Paul J. Romero Jr.	109,783	30.36
Republican	Robert Schwartz	40,196	11.12
Republican	John Verbeek	29,382	8.13
Write-in		4,250	1.17
Total votes		361,615	100.00

Oregon general election
Party	Candidate	Votes	%	±%
Democratic	Jeff Merkley (incumbent)	1,321,047	56.91%	+1.18
Republican	Jo Rae Perkins	912,814	39.32%	+2.45
Libertarian	Gary Dye	42,747	1.84%	–1.23
Pacific Green	Ibrahim Taher	42,239	1.82%	–0.40
Write-in		2,402	0.11%	–0.34
Total votes		2,321,249	100.00%	
Democratic hold				

== Rhode Island ==
Rhode Island election
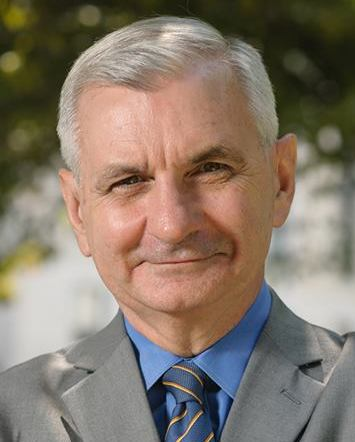

Nominee	Jack Reed	Allen Waters
Party	Democratic	Republican
Popular vote	328,574	164,855
Percentage	66.48%	33.35%
- County results Reed: 50–60% 60–70% 70–80% 80–90% Waters: 50–60%
U.S. senator before election
Jack Reed
Democratic
Elected U.S. senator
Jack Reed
Democratic

Democrat Jack Reed won a fifth term in office, defeating Republican Allen Waters by more than 33 percentage points.

Both Reed and Waters ran unopposed for their respective nominations.

Rhode Island Democratic primary
Party	Candidate	Votes	%
Democratic	Jack Reed (incumbent)	65,859	100.00
Total votes		65,859	100.00

Rhode Island Republican primary
Party	Candidate	Votes	%
Republican	Allen Waters	8,819	100.00
Total votes		8,819	100.00

Rhode Island general election
Party	Candidate	Votes	%	±%
Democratic	Jack Reed (incumbent)	328,574	66.48%	–4.10
Republican	Allen Waters	164,855	33.35%	+4.10
Write-in		833	0.17%	±0.00
Total votes		494,262	100.00%	
Democratic hold				

== South Carolina ==
South Carolina election
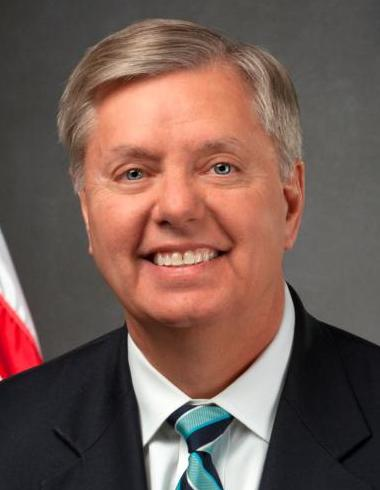

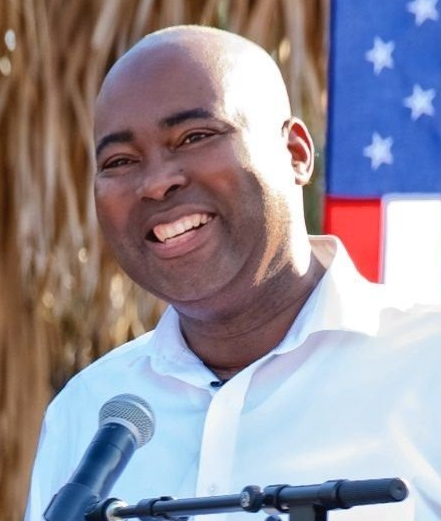
Nominee	Lindsey Graham	Jaime Harrison
Party	Republican	Democratic
Popular vote	1,369,137	1,110,828
Percentage	54.44%	44.17%
- County results Graham: 40–50% 50–60% 60–70% 70–80% Harrison: 50–60% 60–70% 70–80%
U.S. senator before election
Lindsey Graham
Republican
Elected U.S. senator
Lindsey Graham
Republican

Three-term Republican Lindsey Graham won a fourth term in office, defeating Democrat Jaime Harrison by over ten percentage points in a highly publicized race.

Graham defeated three opponents in the June 9 Republican primary.

After his primary opponents dropped out, former South Carolina Democratic Party chairman Jaime Harrison was unopposed for the Democratic nomination.

Bill Bledsoe won the Constitution Party nomination. On October 1, 2020, Bledsoe dropped out of the race and endorsed Graham, but remained on the ballot as required by state law.

Despite the significant Republican lean of the state as a whole, polls indicated that the Senate election was competitive, with summer polling ranging from a tie to a modest advantage for Graham. Graham's popularity had declined as a result of his close embrace of Trump, reversing his outspoken criticism of Trump in the 2016 campaign.

Graham's victory was by a much larger margin than expected, as part of a broader pattern of Republicans overperforming polls in 2020.

South Carolina Republican primary
Party	Candidate	Votes	%
Republican	Lindsey Graham (incumbent)	317,512	67.69
Republican	Michael LaPierre	79,932	17.04
Republican	Joe Reynolds	43,029	9.17
Republican	Dwayne Buckner	28,570	6.09
Total votes		469,043	100.00

South Carolina general election
Party	Candidate	Votes	%	±%
Republican	Lindsey Graham (incumbent)	1,369,137	54.44%	+0.17
Democratic	Jaime Harrison	1,110,828	44.17%	+5.39
Constitution	Bill Bledsoe	32,845	1.30%	N/A
Write-in		2,294	0.09%	–0.29
Total votes		2,515,104	100.00%	
Republican hold				

== South Dakota ==
South Dakota election
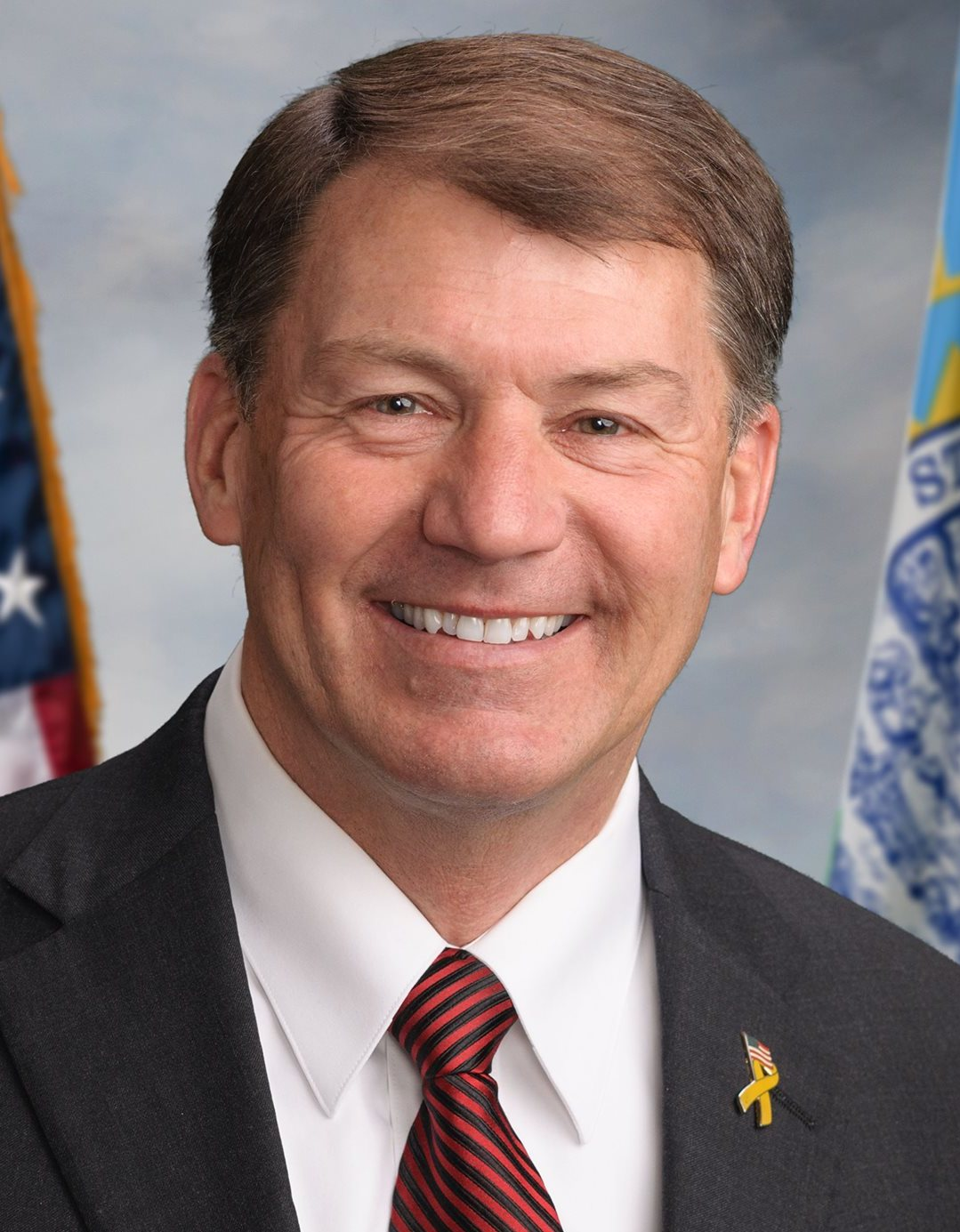

Nominee	Mike Rounds	Dan Ahlers
Party	Republican	Democratic
Popular vote	276,232	143,987
Percentage	65.74%	34.26%
- County results Rounds: 50–60% 60–70% 70–80% 80–90% >90% Ahlers: 50–60% 70–80% 80–90%
U.S. senator before election
Mike Rounds
Republican
Elected U.S. senator
Mike Rounds
Republican

Republican Mike Rounds, former governor of South Dakota, won a second term in office, defeating Democrat Dan Ahlers.

Rounds faced a primary challenge from state representative Scyller Borglum.

Ahlers, a South Dakota state representative, ran unopposed in the Democratic primary.

One independent candidate, Clayton Walker, filed but failed to qualify for the ballot.

South Dakota Republican primary
Party	Candidate	Votes	%
Republican	Mike Rounds (incumbent)	70,365	75.23
Republican	Scyller Borglum	23,164	24.77
Total votes		93,529	100.00

South Dakota general election
Party	Candidate	Votes	%	±%
Republican	Mike Rounds (incumbent)	276,232	65.74%	+15.37
Democratic	Daniel Ahlers	143,987	34.26%	+4.75
Total votes		420,219	100.00%	
Republican hold				

== Tennessee ==
Tennessee election
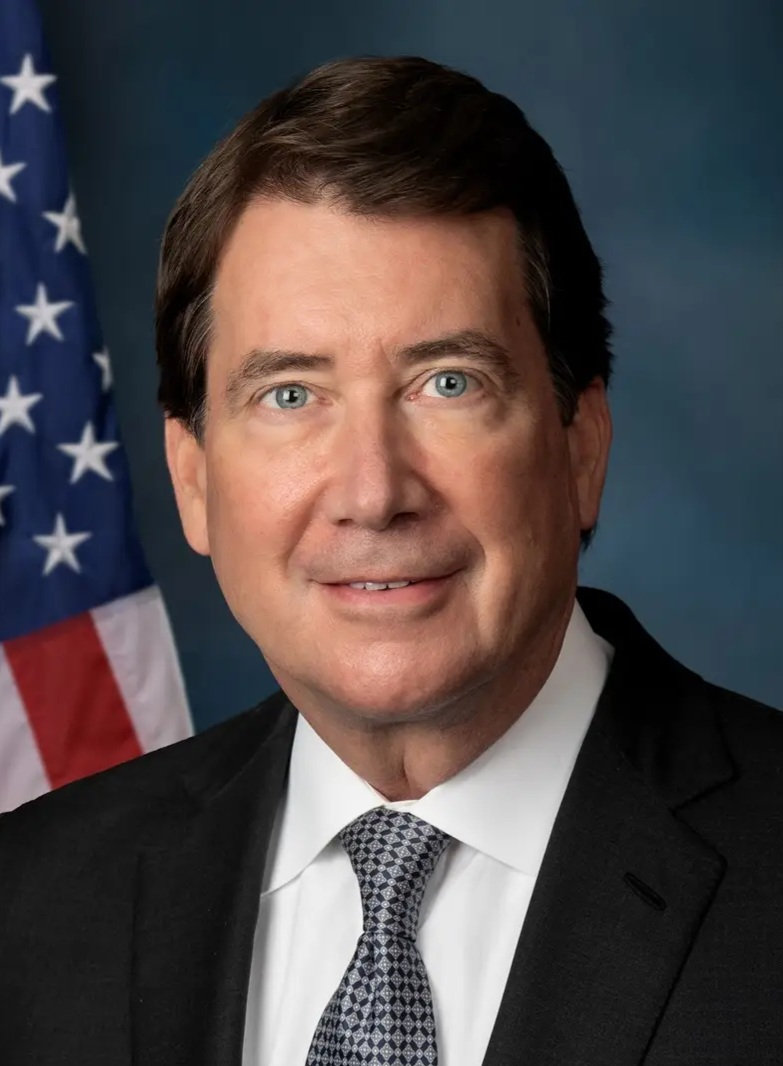

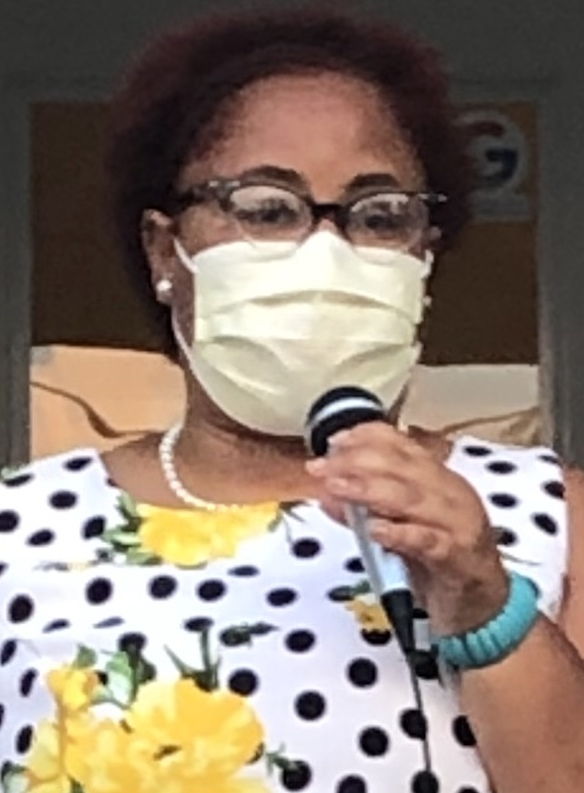
Nominee	Bill Hagerty	Marquita Bradshaw
Party	Republican	Democratic
Popular vote	1,840,926	1,040,691
Percentage	62.20%	35.16%
- County results Hagerty: 50–60% 60–70% 70–80% 80–90% Bradshaw: 50–60% 60–70%
U.S. senator before election
Lamar Alexander
Republican
Elected U.S. senator
Bill Hagerty
Republican

Three-term Republican Lamar Alexander was re-elected in 2014. He announced in December 2018 that he would not seek a fourth term.

Assisted by an endorsement from Trump, former ambassador to Japan Bill Hagerty won the Republican nomination and the seat.

Hagerty defeated orthopedic surgeon Manny Sethi and 13 others in the Republican primary.

Environmental activist Marquita Bradshaw of Memphis defeated James Mackler, an Iraq War veteran and Nashville attorney, in the Democratic primary, a major upset.

Nine independent candidates also appeared on the general election ballot.

Hagerty easily defeated Bradshaw.

Tennessee Republican primary
Party	Candidate	Votes	%
Republican	Bill Hagerty	331,267	50.75
Republican	Manny Sethi	257,223	39.41
Republican	George Flinn, Jr.	22,454	3.44
Republican	Jon Henry	8,104	1.24
Republican	Natisha Brooks	8,072	1.24
Republican	Byron Bush	5,420	0.83
Republican	Clifford Adkins	5,316	0.81
Republican	Terry Dicus	2,279	0.35
Republican	Tom Emerson, Jr.	2,252	0.35
Republican	David Schuster	2,045	0.31
Republican	John Osborne	1,877	0.29
Republican	Roy Dale Cope	1,791	0.27
Republican	Kent Morrell	1,769	0.27
Republican	Aaron Pettigrew	1,622	0.25
Republican	Glen Neal, Jr.	1,233	0.19
Total votes		652,724	100.00

Tennessee Democratic primary
Party	Candidate	Votes	%
Democratic	Marquita Bradshaw	117,962	35.51
Democratic	Robin Kimbrough Hayes	88,492	26.64
Democratic	James Mackler	78,966	23.77
Democratic	Gary G. Davis	30,758	9.26
Democratic	Mark Pickrell	16,045	4.83
Total votes		332,223	100.00

Tennessee general election
Party	Candidate	Votes	%	±%
Republican	Bill Hagerty	1,840,926	62.20%	+0.33
Democratic	Marquita Bradshaw	1,040,691	35.16%	+3.29
Independent	Elizabeth McLeod	16,652	0.56%	N/A
Independent	Yomi Faparusi	10,727	0.36%	N/A
Independent	Stephen Hooper	9,609	0.32%	N/A
Independent	Kacey Morgan (withdrawn)	9,598	0.32%	N/A
Independent	Ronnie Henley	8,478	0.30%	N/A
Independent	Aaron James	7,203	0.29%	N/A
Independent	Eric William Stansberry	6,781	0.23%	N/A
Independent	Dean Hill	4,872	0.16%	N/A
Independent	Jeffrey Grunau	4,160	0.14%	N/A
Write-in		64	0.00%	±0.00
Total votes		2,959,761	100.00%	
Republican hold				

== Texas ==
Texas election
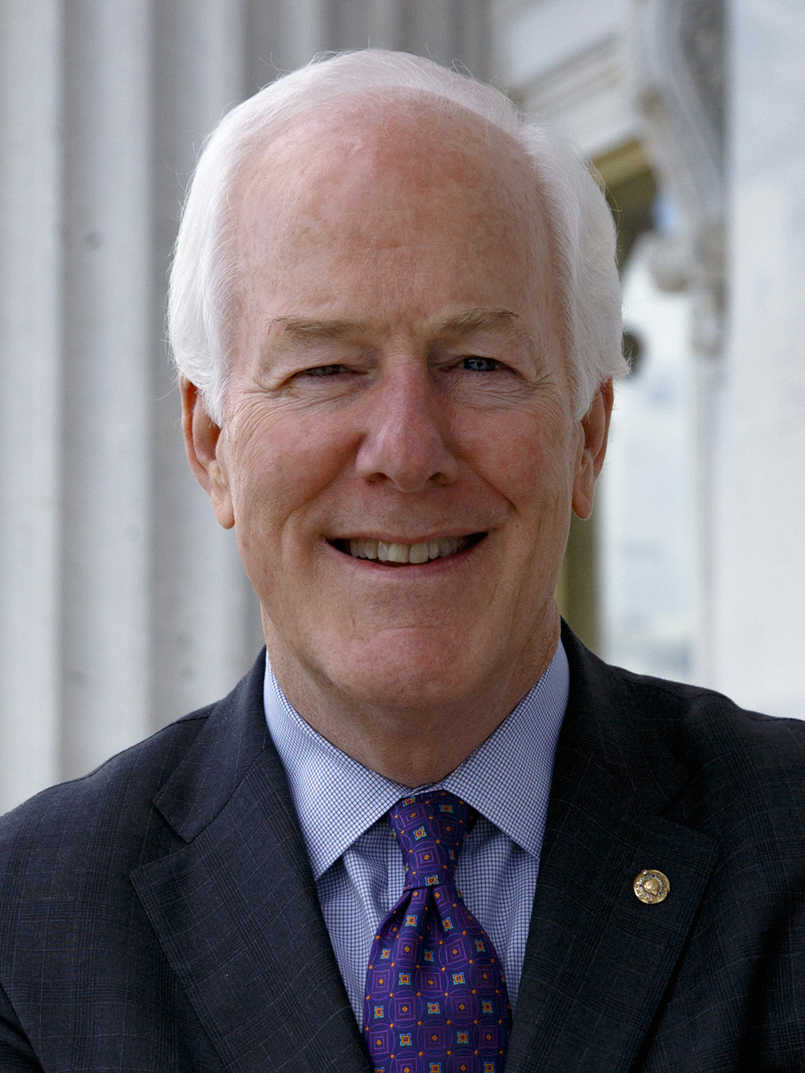

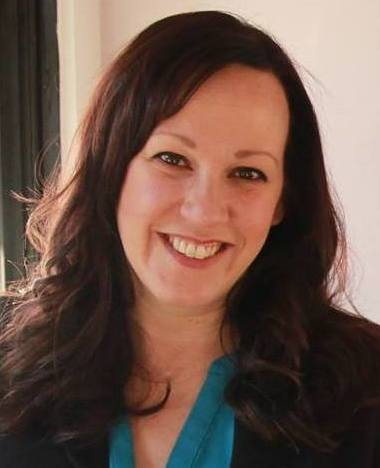
Nominee	John Cornyn	MJ Hegar
Party	Republican	Democratic
Popular vote	5,962,983	4,888,764
Percentage	53.51%	43.87%
- County results Cornyn: 50–60% 60–70% 70–80% 80–90% >90% Hegar: 40–50% 50–60% 60–70%
U.S. senator before election
John Cornyn
Republican
Elected U.S. senator
John Cornyn
Republican

Republican John Cornyn won a fourth term in office, defeating Democrat MJ Hegar by a little less than ten percentage points.

Cornyn defeated four other candidates in the Republican primary, with 76.04% of the vote.

Hegar, an Air Force combat veteran and the 2018 Democratic nominee for Texas's 31st congressional district, defeated runner-up state senator Royce West and 11 other candidates in the Democratic primary. Hegar and West advanced to a primary run-off election on July 14 to decide the nomination, and Hegar prevailed.

The Green and Libertarian Parties also appeared on the general election ballot. Candidates from the Human Rights Party and the People over Politics Party and three independents failed to qualify.

Statewide races in Texas have been growing more competitive in recent years, and polling in August/September showed Cornyn with a lead of 4–10 points over Hegar, with a significant fraction of the electorate still undecided. Cornyn's victory was at the higher end of the polling spectrum.

Texas Republican primary
Party	Candidate	Votes	%
Republican	John Cornyn (incumbent)	1,470,669	76.04
Republican	Dwayne Stovall	231,104	11.95
Republican	Mark Yancey	124,864	6.46
Republican	John Anthony Castro	86,916	4.49
Republican	Virgil Bierschwale	20,494	1.06
Total votes		1,934,047	100.00

Texas Democratic primary
Party	Candidate	Votes	%
Democratic	MJ Hegar	417,160	22.31
Democratic	Royce West	274,074	14.66
Democratic	Cristina Tzintzún Ramirez	246,659	13.19
Democratic	Annie Garcia	191,900	10.27
Democratic	Amanda Edwards	189,624	10.14
Democratic	Chris Bell	159,751	8.55
Democratic	Sema Hernandez	137,892	7.38
Democratic	Michael Cooper	92,463	4.95
Democratic	Victor Hugo Harris	59,710	3.19
Democratic	Adrian Ocegueda	41,566	2.22
Democratic	Jack Daniel Foster Jr.	31,718	1.70
Democratic	D. R. Hunter	26,902	1.44
Total votes		1,869,419	100.00

Texas Democratic primary runoff
Party	Candidate	Votes	%
Democratic	MJ Hegar	502,516	52.24
Democratic	Royce West	459,457	47.76
Total votes		961,973	100.00

Texas general election
Party	Candidate	Votes	%	±%
Republican	John Cornyn (incumbent)	5,962,983	53.51%	–8.05
Democratic	MJ Hegar	4,888,764	43.87%	+9.51
Libertarian	Kerry McKennon	209,722	1.88%	–1.00
Green	David Collins	81,893	0.73%	–0.45
Write-in	Ricardo Turullols-Bonilla	678	0.01%	N/A
Total votes		11,144,040	100.00%	
Republican hold				

== Virginia ==
Virginia election
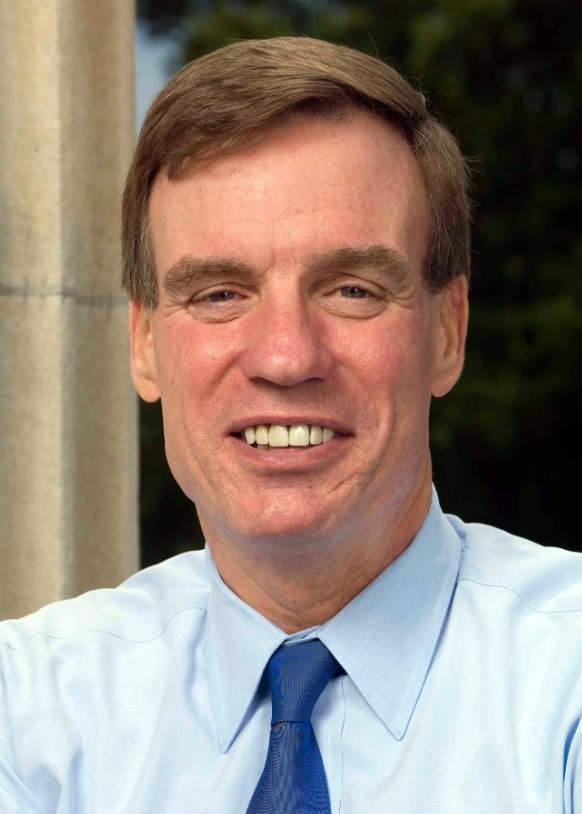

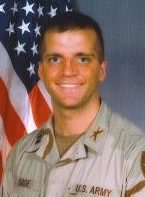
Nominee	Mark Warner	Daniel Gade
Party	Democratic	Republican
Popular vote	2,466,500	1,934,199
Percentage	55.99%	43.91%
- County results Warner: 50–60% 60–70% 70–80% 80–90% Gade: 50–60% 60–70% 70–80%
U.S. senator before election
Mark Warner
Democratic
Elected U.S. senator
Mark Warner
Democratic

Democrat Mark Warner won a third term in office, defeating Republican Daniel Gade.

Warner ran unopposed in the Democratic primary.

Gade, a professor and U.S. Army veteran, defeated teacher Alissa Baldwin and U.S. Army veteran and intelligence officer Thomas Speciale in the Republican primary.

Virginia Republican primary
Party	Candidate	Votes	%
Republican	Daniel Gade	208,754	67.40
Republican	Alissa Baldwin	56,165	18.13
Republican	Thomas Speciale	44,795	14.46
Total votes		309,714	100.00

Virginia general election
Party	Candidate	Votes	%	±%
Democratic	Mark Warner (incumbent)	2,466,500	55.99%	+6.84
Republican	Daniel Gade	1,934,199	43.91%	–4.43
Write-in		4,388	0.10%	+0.02
Total votes		4,405,087	100.00%	
Democratic hold				

== West Virginia ==
West Virginia election
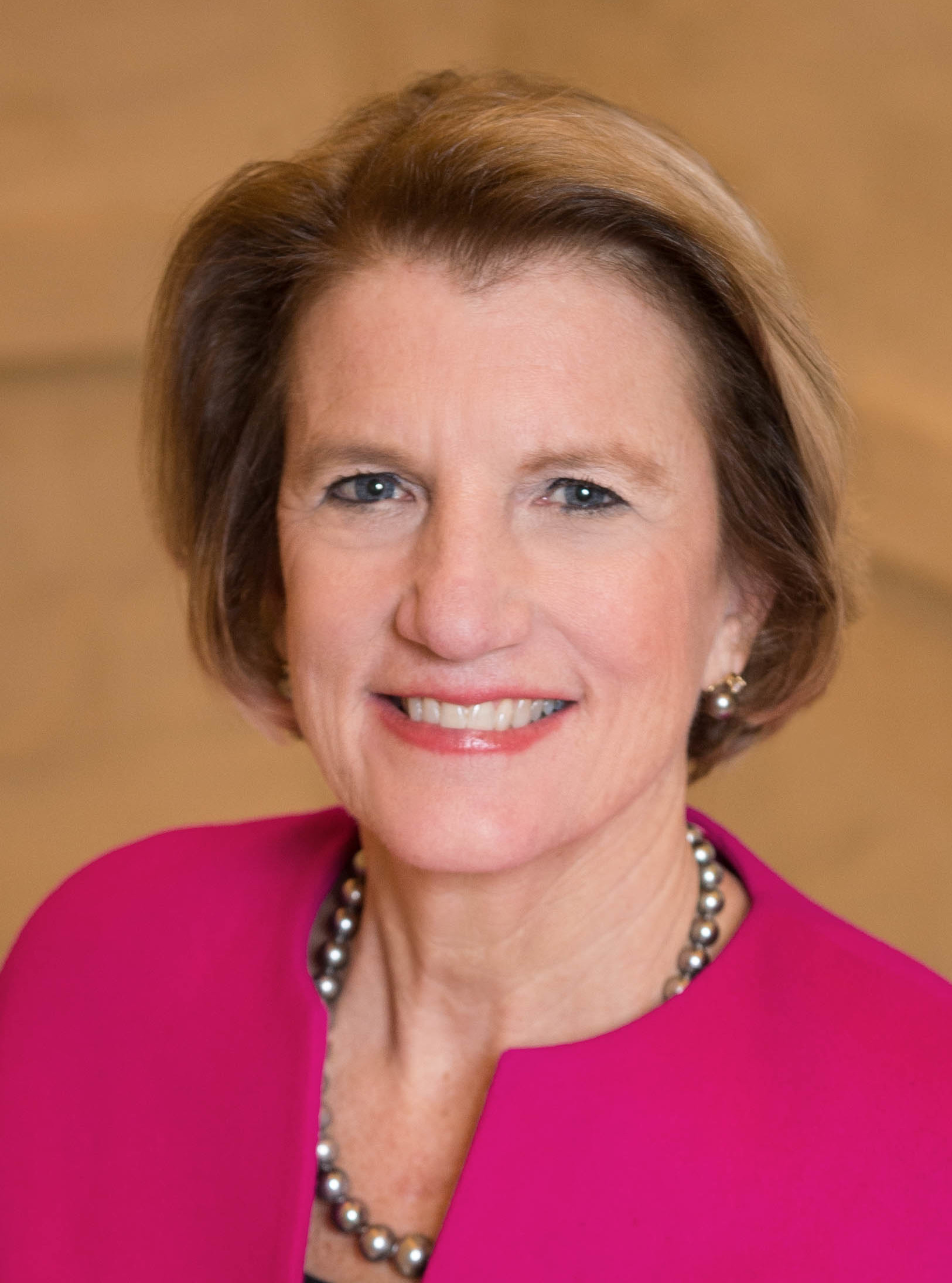

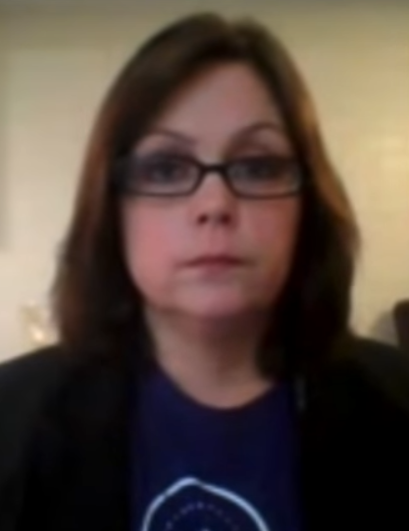
Nominee	Shelley Moore Capito	Paula Jean Swearengin
Party	Republican	Democratic
Popular vote	547,454	210,309
Percentage	70.28%	27.00%
- County results Capito: 50–60% 60–70% 70–80% 80–90%
U.S. senator before election
Shelley Moore Capito
Republican
Elected U.S. senator
Shelley Moore Capito
Republican

Republican Shelley Moore Capito was re-elected to a second term in a landslide, defeating Democrat Paula Jean Swearengin by 43 points.

Capito was unsuccessfully challenged in the Republican primary by farmer Larry Butcher and Allen Whitt, president of the West Virginia Family Policy Council.

Swearengin, an environmental activist and unsuccessful candidate for Senate in 2018, won the Democratic primary, defeating former mayor of South Charleston Richie Robb and former state senator Richard Ojeda, who previously ran for Congress and, briefly, president in 2020.

Libertarian candidate David Moran also appeared on the general election ballot.

West Virginia Republican primary
Party	Candidate	Votes	%
Republican	Shelley Moore Capito (incumbent)	173,847	83.32
Republican	Allen Whitt	20,075	9.62
Republican	Larry Butcher	14,717	7.05
Total votes		208,639	100.00

West Virginia Democratic primary
Party	Candidate	Votes	%
Democratic	Paula Jean Swearengin	72,292	38.39
Democratic	Richard Ojeda	61,954	32.90
Democratic	Richie Robb	54,048	28.70
Total votes		188,294	100.00

West Virginia general election
Party	Candidate	Votes	%	±%
Republican	Shelley Moore Capito (incumbent)	547,454	70.28%	+8.16
Democratic	Paula Jean Swearengin	210,309	27.00%	–7.47
Libertarian	David Moran	21,155	2.72%	+1.09
Total votes		778,918	100.00%	
Republican hold				

== Wyoming ==
Wyoming election
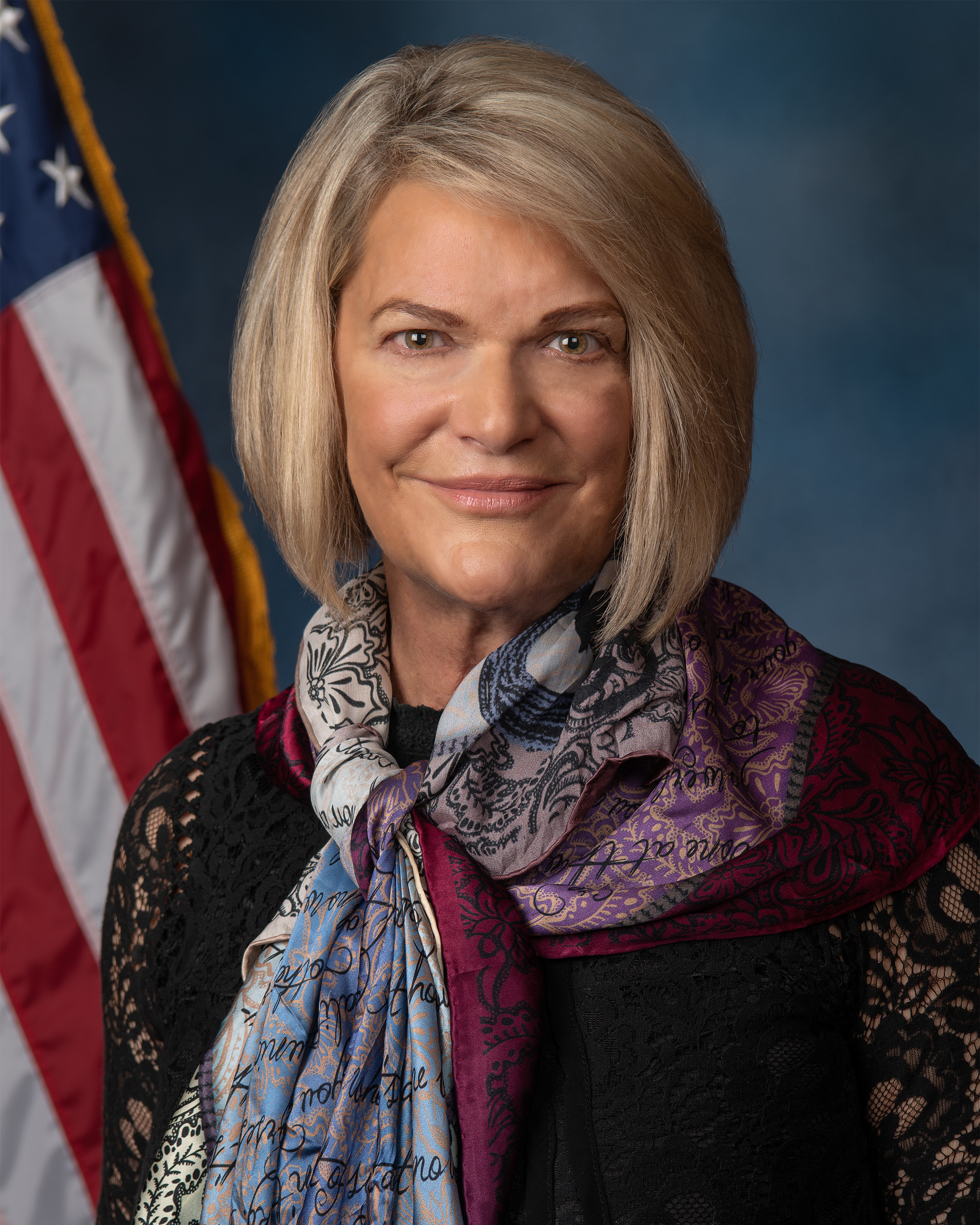

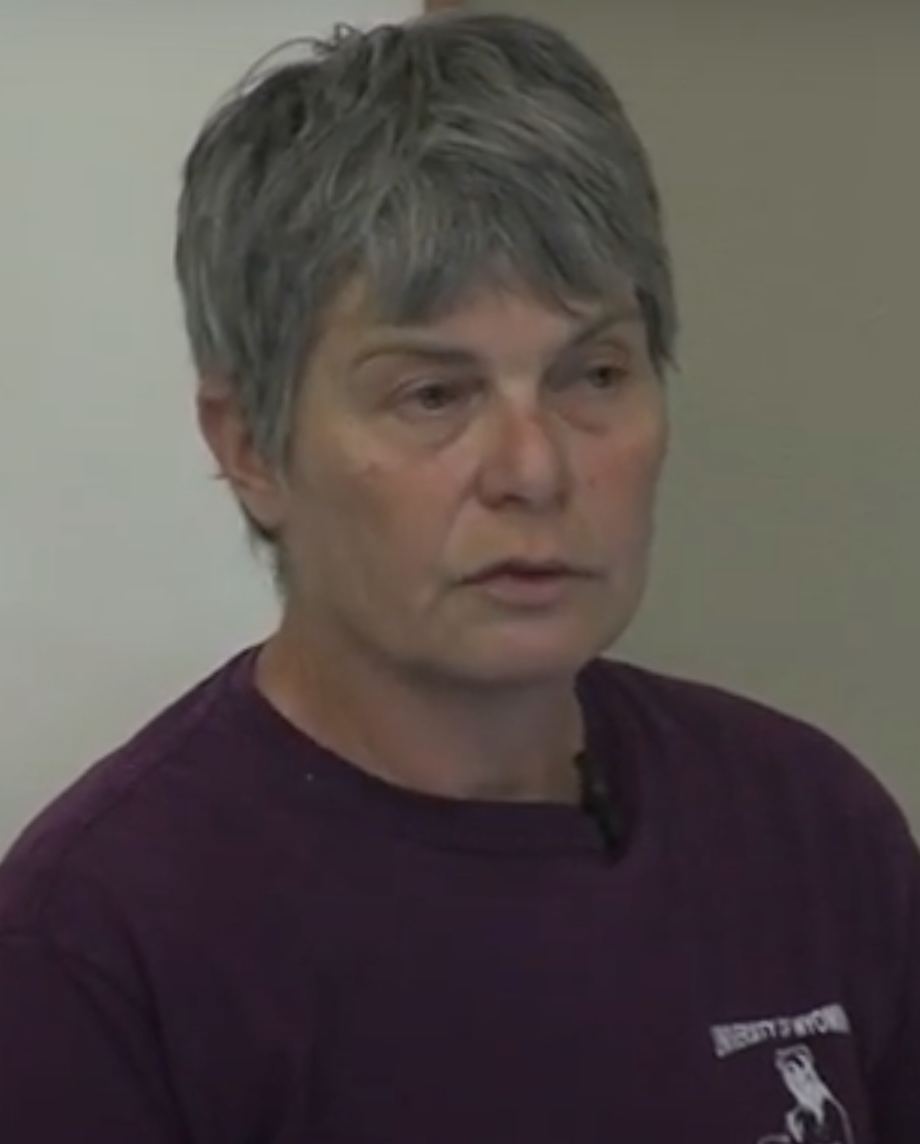
Nominee	Cynthia Lummis	Merav Ben-David
Party	Republican	Democratic
Popular vote	198,100	72,766
Percentage	72.85%	26.76%
- County results Lummis: 50–60% 60–70% 70–80% 80–90% >90% Ben-David: 60–70%
U.S. senator before election
Mike Enzi
Republican
Elected U.S. senator
Cynthia Lummis
Republican

Four-term Republican Mike Enzi announced in May 2019 that he would retire. Republican nominee Cynthia Lummis defeated Democratic nominee Merav Ben-David by more than 46 percentage points.

Lummis won the Republican nomination in a field of nine candidates.

Ben-David, the chair of the Department of Zoology and Physiology at the University of Wyoming, defeated community activists Yana Ludwig and James Debrine, think-tank executive Nathan Wendt, and perennial candidates Rex Wilde and Kenneth R. Casner for the Democratic nomination.

Wyoming Republican primary
Party	Candidate	Votes	%
Republican	Cynthia Lummis	63,511	59.67
Republican	Robert Short	13,473	12.66
Republican	Bryan Miller	10,946	10.28
Republican	Donna Rice	5,881	5.53
Republican	R. Mark Armstrong	3,904	3.67
Republican	Joshua Wheeler	3,763	3.53
Republican	John Holtz	1,820	1.71
Republican	Devon Cade	1,027	0.96
Republican	Michael Kemler	985	0.93
Republican	Star Roselli	627	0.59
Write-in		501	0.47
Total votes		106,438	100.00

Wyoming Democratic primary
Party	Candidate	Votes	%
Democratic	Merav Ben-David	9,584	40.28
Democratic	Yana Ludwig	4,931	20.73
Democratic	Nathan Wendt	4,212	17.70
Democratic	Kenneth Casner	2,139	8.99
Democratic	Rex Wilde	1,888	7.93
Democratic	James DeBrine	865	3.64
Write-in		173	0.73
Total votes		23,792	100.00

Wyoming general election
Party	Candidate	Votes	%	±%
Republican	Cynthia Lummis	198,100	72.85%	+0.66
Democratic	Merav Ben-David	72,766	26.76%	+9.31
Write-in		1,071	0.39%	+0.11
Total votes		271,937	100.00%	
Republican hold				

== See also ==
- 2020 United States elections
- 2020 United States House of Representatives elections
  - List of new members of the 117th United States Congress
- 2020 United States presidential election
- 2020 United States gubernatorial elections
- 2020 United States Shadow Senator election in the District of Columbia
