= Selz (surname) =

Selz and its variant Seltz is a South German, Alsatian and Ashkenazic habitational surname for a person living in the originally Swabian and now French settlement Seltz (German spelling: Selz) and may refer to:

== Selz ==
- Bernard Selz (born 1940), American financier
- Gabrielle Selz (born 1958), Author, Art Critic, Art Appraiser
- Jane Weiller Selz (1912–1989), American golfer
- Marc Selz (born c. 1970), American film director and producer
- Otto Selz (1881–1943), German psychologist
- Peter Selz (1919–2019), German-born American art historian and museum director
- Reason Selz (born 1995), American Engineer

== Seltz ==
- Rollie Seltz (1924–2022), retired American basketball player

== See also ==
- Selzer
- Seltzer (surname)
- Zeltser
