= Selz =

Selz may refer to:

- Selz (surname), a German surname, includes a list of people with this last name
- Selz (river), a tributary to the Rhine in Rhineland-Palatinate, Germany
- Selz, Alsace, the German name of Seltz, a commune in Bas-Rhin, Alsace, France
- Selz Abbey, Alsace, France
- Selz, Italy, a village near Ronchi dei Legionari, also known as Cave di Selz
- Selz or Seltz, Luxembourg, a village near Tandel
- Selz, North Dakota, United States
- Selz, Ukraine, an earlier name of Lymanske
- Seille (Moselle), the French river known in German as Selz

== See also ==
- Rhein-Selz, a municipality in Mainz-Bingen, Rhineland-Palatinate, Germany
- Salz (disambiguation)
- Selzen, a municipality in Rhineland-Palatinate, Germany
- Sulz (disambiguation)
- Sülz (disambiguation)
