= Seltzer (disambiguation) =

Seltzer is carbonated water.

Seltzer may also refer to:

- Hard seltzer, alcoholic drink
- Seltzer (surname)
- Seltzer, Pennsylvania, a census-designated place in Schuylkill County, Pennsylvania, United States

== See also ==
- Alka-Seltzer
- Bromo-Seltzer
- Selters (Lahn), a village in Germany known for its natural mineral springs
- Seltzer bottle
- Selzer
- Setzer
