= Michael Franken =

Retired US Navy officer (born 1957)

Mike Franken
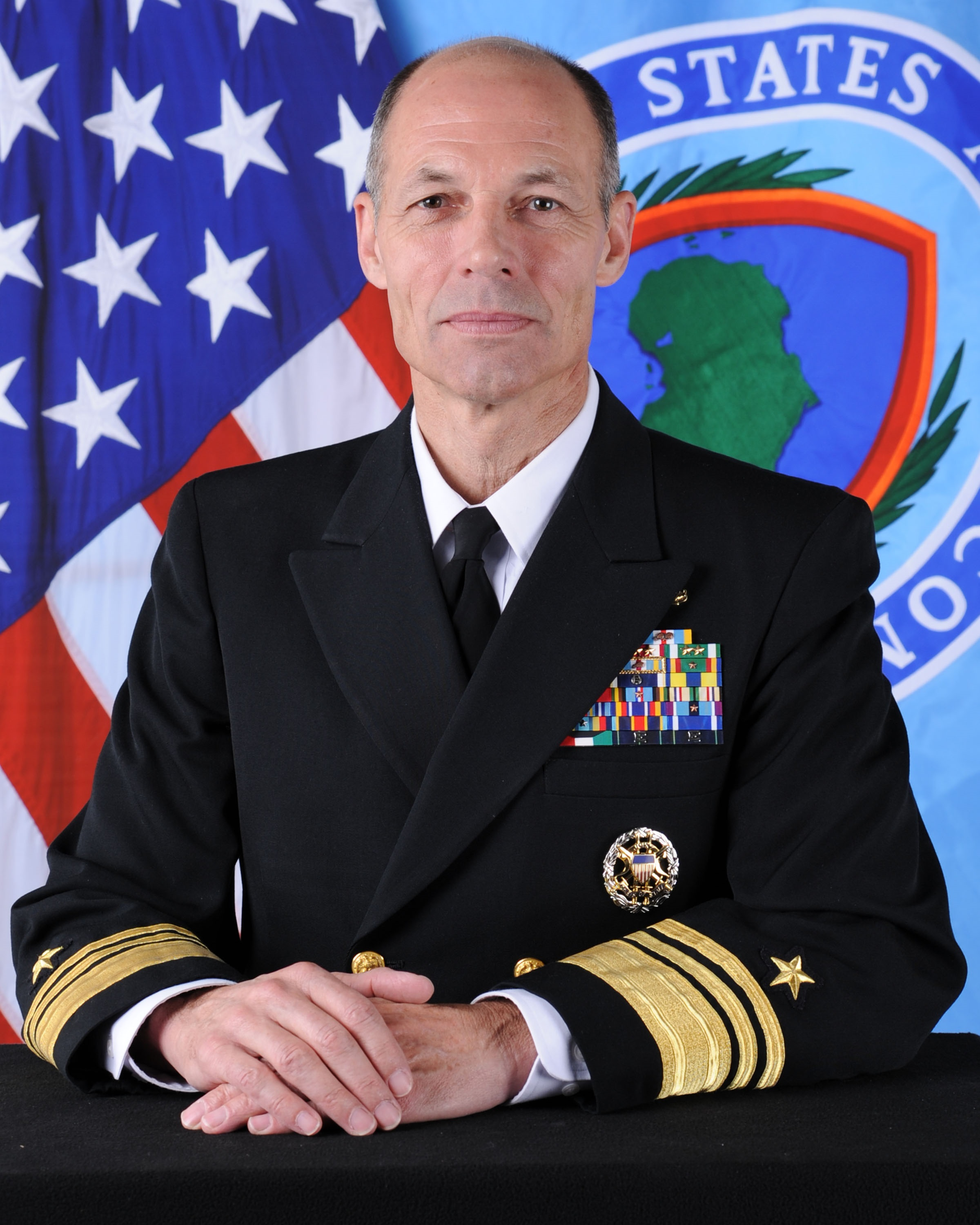
- Franken in 2015

Director of the Defense POW/MIA Accounting Agency
- In office January 15, 2015 – September 5, 2017
- President: Barack Obama; Donald Trump
- Preceded by: Position established
- Succeeded by: Kelly McKeague

Personal details
- Born: Michael Thane Franken; November 8, 1957 (age 68) Sioux Center, Iowa, U.S.
- Party: Democratic
- Spouse: Jordan Franken (m. 1989)
- Children: 2
- Education: University of Nebraska–Lincoln (BS); Naval Postgraduate School (MS)

Military service
- Allegiance: United States
- Branch/service: United States Navy
- Years of service: 1978–2017
- Rank: Vice Admiral
- Commands: Task Group 152.0; Destroyer Squadron 28; USS Winston S. Churchill (DDG 81)
- Battles/wars: Gulf War
- Awards: Defense Distinguished Service Medal; Navy Distinguished Service Medal; Defense Superior Service Medal (3); Legion of Merit (2)

Michael Thane Franken (born November 8, 1957) is an American retired United States Navy vice admiral. His final posting was as deputy director of military operations for the United States Africa Command. Franken was a Democratic candidate in the 2020 United States Senate election in Iowa, but lost the June 2 primary to Theresa Greenfield. Franken was the Democratic nominee for the 2022 United States Senate election in Iowa, which he lost to Republican incumbent Chuck Grassley.

== Early life and education ==
Franken was born in Sioux Center, Iowa. He attended Morningside College and the Naval Science Institute before graduating on an ROTC scholarship from the College of Engineering at the University of Nebraska–Lincoln and entering the United States Navy in 1981. He is a graduate of the Naval Postgraduate School's college of physics, MIT Seminar XXI, the University of Virginia school of executive education, the Brookings Institution's legislative affairs curriculum, and Babson College's business leadership program. His early operational assignments were in guided missile destroyers.

== Navy career ==
Franken was the first commanding officer of USS Winston S. Churchill (DDG 81). He previously served on the USS King (DDG-41), USS Dahlgren (DDG-43) and USS Barry (DDG-52). As commodore, he commanded Destroyer Squadron 28 and Task Group 152.0 for the Eisenhower Strike Group. Franken also served as the United States Africa Command's deputy for military operations, the United States Central Command's flag officer responsible for plans and strategy for three years, the chief of staff at U.S. Third Fleet, and as executive assistant to Commander, Fleet Forces Command.

From 2011 to 2012, Franken commanded the Combined Joint Task Force – Horn of Africa (CJTF-HOA) in Djibouti, Africa, responsible for the U.S. military activity throughout East Africa and in the islands of the Indian Ocean.

In Washington, D.C., he served a fellowship in congressional affairs for the Office of the Secretary of the Navy; as the political-military chair in the Chief of Naval Operations' Executive Panel, in Navy's Plans and Strategy Deep Blue staff; in the Assessments Division in support of Navy's representation in the Joint Requirements Oversight Council and in the Joint Staff's Joint Operations Division overseeing U.S. Pacific Command operations. He presented the worldwide orders book to Secretary Donald Rumsfeld from 2003 to 2005 and was the first military officer to serve as a legislative fellow for Senator Ted Kennedy.

Starting in January 2015, Franken was the first director of the Defense POW/MIA Accounting Agency when it was created through the merger of the Joint POW/MIA Accounting Command, the Defense Prisoner of War/Missing Personnel Office, and parts of the Air Force's Life Sciences Lab. The Defense POW/MIA Accounting agency is an 800-person defense agency which oversees the location and retrieval of the remains of American veterans of foreign wars.

== Senate Campaigns and Electoral History ==
County results Results by county: Greenfield—70–80% Greenfield—60–70% Greenfield—50–60% Greenfield—40–50% Greenfield—<40% Franken—<40%

=== 2020 ===
On August 26, 2019, Franken announced that he would be running for the Democratic Party nomination for United States Senate in Iowa for the seat held by Joni Ernst, a member of the Republican Party.

Franken was one of a number of Democrats who competed in the primary election held on June 2. The winner, Theresa Greenfield, lost to incumbent Ernst in the November 3 general election.

2020 US Senate Democratic primary results
Party	Candidate	Votes	%
Democratic	Theresa Greenfield	132,001	47.71%
Democratic	Michael T. Franken	68,851	24.88%
Democratic	Kimberly Graham	41,554	15.02%
Democratic	Eddie Mauro	30,400	10.99%
Democratic	Cal Woods (withdrawn)	3,372	1.21%
Democratic	Write-In	514	0.19%
Total votes		276,692	100.00%

=== 2022 ===
On October 14, 2021, Franken confirmed that he would be seeking the Democratic Party nomination for United States Senate in Iowa for the seat held by Chuck Grassley, a member of the Republican Party. He defeated former U.S. Representative Abby Finkenauer in the primary election in a major upset. Grassley defeated him 56%–44% in the general election.

2022 United States Senate election in Iowa
Party	Candidate	Votes	%	±%
Republican	Chuck Grassley (incumbent)	681,507	56.0%	−4.09%
Democratic	Michael Franken	533,717	43.9%	+8.24%
Republican hold				

== Personal life ==
Franken was born the youngest of nine children in rural Sioux County, Iowa. His father was a machinist and blacksmith, while his mother was a school teacher. Franken joined the U.S. Navy at the age of 22 at the urging of an older brother.

In 1989, he married his wife Jordan. Together, they have two children. Franken lives in Alexandria, Virginia.

Party political offices
Preceded by Patty Judge	Democratic nominee for U.S. Senator from Iowa (Class 3); 2022	Most recent
