= 2020 United States Senate election in Iowa =

- November 3, 2020
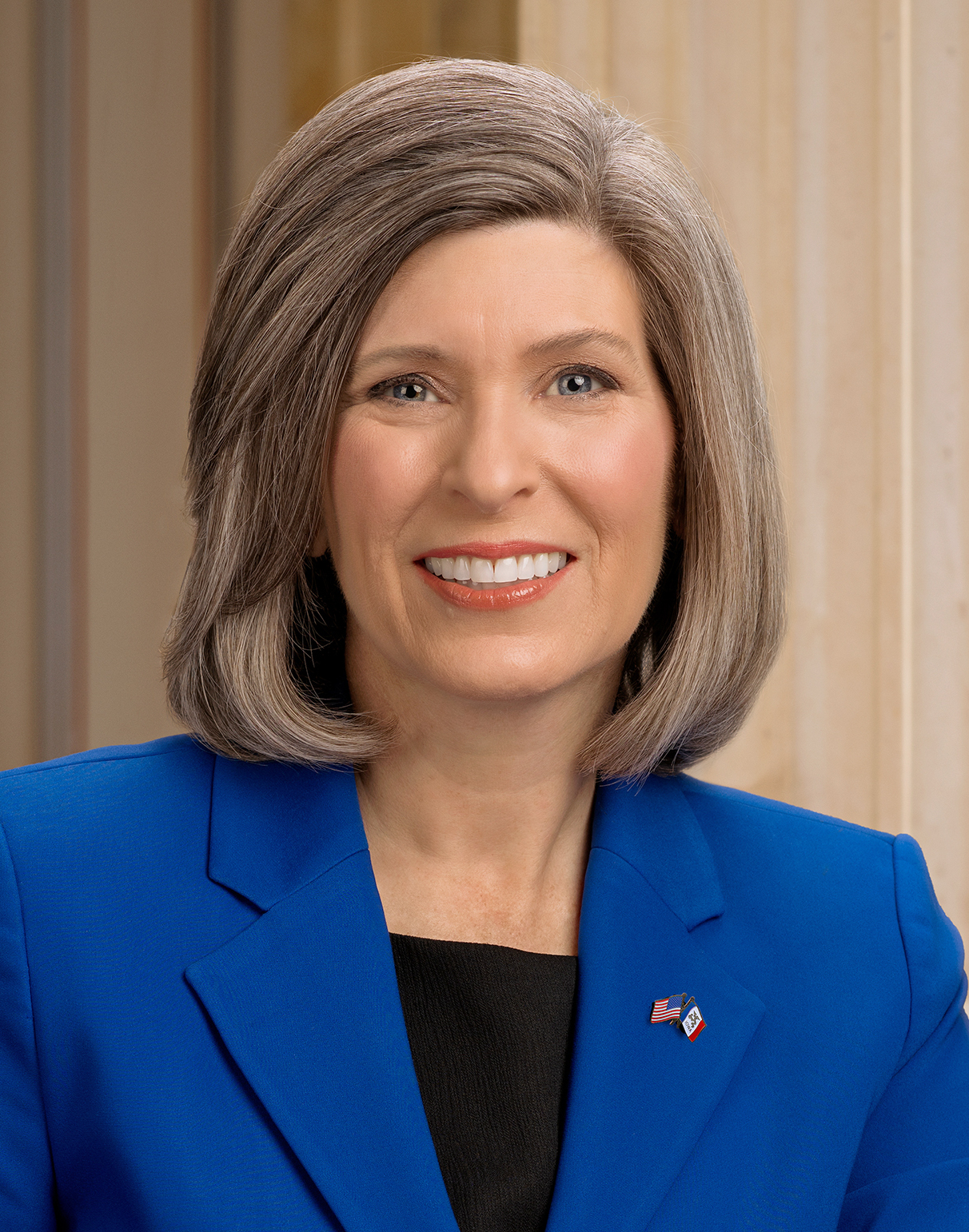

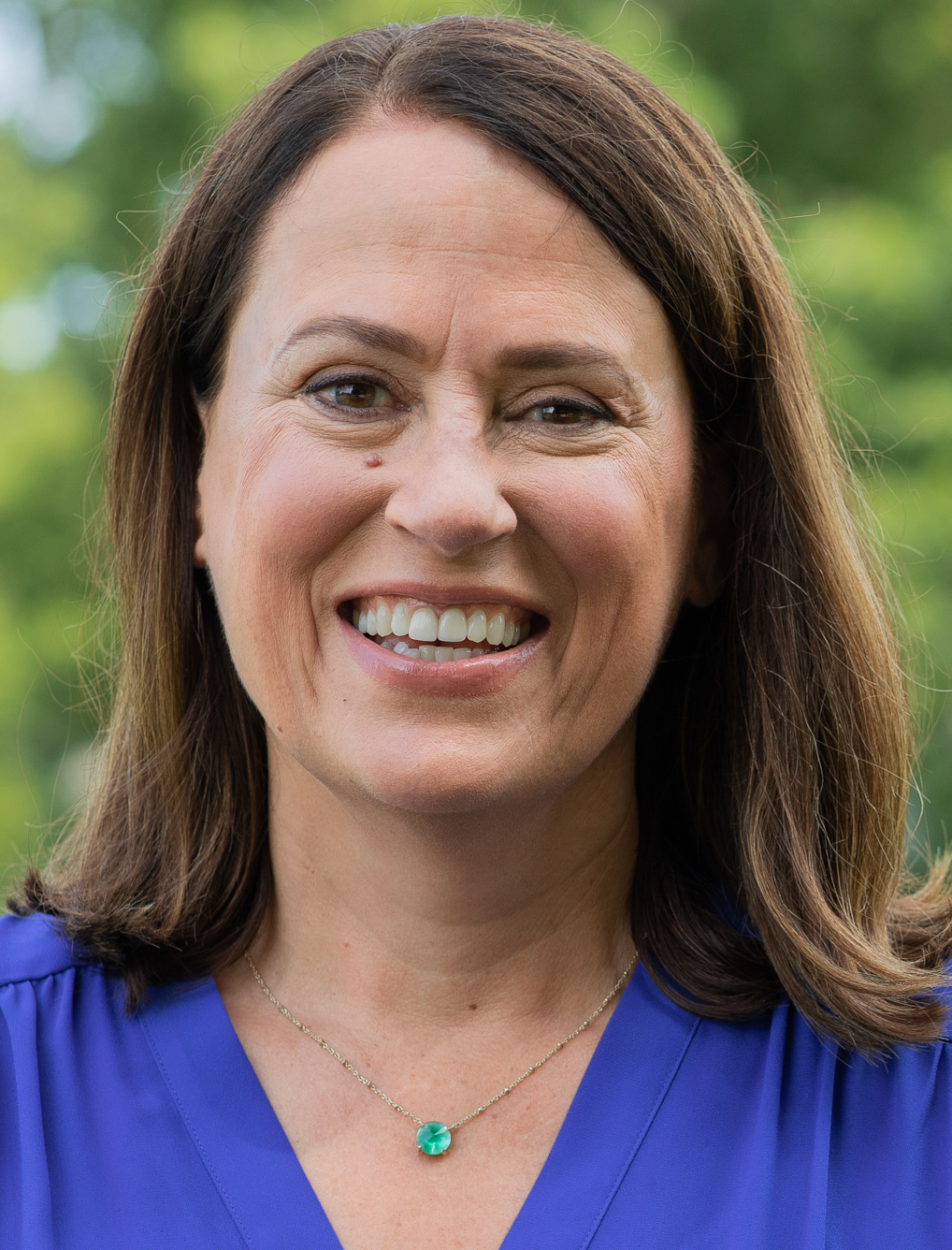
Nominee	Joni Ernst	Theresa Greenfield
Party	Republican	Democratic
Popular vote	864,997	754,859
Percentage	51.74%	45.15%
- Ernst: 40–50% 50–60% 60–70% 70–80% 80–90% >90% Greenfield: 40–50% 50–60% 60–70% 70–80% 80–90% >90% Tie: 40–50%
U.S. senator before election
Joni Ernst
Republican
Elected U.S. Senator
Joni Ernst
Republican

The 2020 United States Senate election in Iowa was held on November 3, 2020, to elect a member of the United States Senate to represent the State of Iowa, concurrently with the 2020 U.S. presidential election, elections to the United States Senate in other states, elections to the United States House of Representatives, and various state and local elections. Primaries were held on June 2. Incumbent Republican Senator Joni Ernst won re-election to a second term, defeating Democratic nominee Theresa Greenfield.

Most experts and pollsters considered this race and the concurrent presidential race as a tossup because of incumbent president Donald Trump's low approval ratings and Ernst's own popularity dropping in polls, partly due to a viral moment in a debate where she did not know the break-even price for soybeans. Despite this, Ernst was reelected by a larger-than-expected 6.6 points, while Trump simultaneously won the state with a bigger yet similarly unexpected margin of victory. Ernst carried an overwhelming majority of the state's counties including many rural ones, while Greenfield carried only eight counties: Polk, Linn, Scott, Johnson, Black Hawk, Story, Cerro Gordo and Jefferson.

== Republican primary ==
=== Candidates ===
==== Nominee ====
- Joni Ernst, incumbent U.S. senator

==== Withdrawn ====
- Paul Rieck

=== Endorsements ===
Joni Ernst

Organizations

- Maggie's List

=== Result ===
Republican primary results
Party	Candidate	Votes	%
Republican	Joni Ernst (incumbent)	226,589	98.64%
Republican	Write-in	3,132	1.36%
Total votes		229,721	100.00%

== Democratic primary ==
On June 2, 2020, Theresa Greenfield won the Democratic primary with 47.71% of the vote, defeating three other major candidates, including Michael Franken, a retired U.S. Navy admiral and former aide to U.S. Senator Ted Kennedy.

=== Candidates ===
==== Nominee ====
- Theresa Greenfield, businesswoman, candidate for Iowa's 3rd congressional district in 2018

==== Eliminated in primary ====
- Michael Franken, retired U.S. Navy admiral and former aide to U.S. Senator Ted Kennedy
- Kimberly Graham, child welfare attorney
- Eddie Mauro, businessman, teacher, candidate for Iowa's 3rd congressional district in 2018

==== Withdrawn ====
- Cal Woods, journalist and U.S. Navy veteran (endorsed Michael T. Franken) (remained on ballot)

==== Declined ====
- Cindy Axne, incumbent U.S. representative for Iowa's 3rd congressional district (running for reelection, endorsed Greenfield)
- Chet Culver, former governor of Iowa
- Deirdre DeJear, nominee for secretary of state of Iowa in 2018
- Abby Finkenauer, incumbent U.S. representative for Iowa's 1st congressional district (running for reelection, endorsed Greenfield)
- Amber Gustafson, candidate for the Iowa Senate in 2018 (endorsed Greenfield)
- Rita Hart, former state senator and nominee for Lieutenant Governor of Iowa in 2018 (running in Iowa's 2nd congressional district)
- Rob Hogg, state senator
- Liz Mathis, state senator
- Rob Sand, Iowa state auditor
- J.D. Scholten, nominee for Iowa's 4th congressional district in 2018 (running in Iowa's 4th congressional district)
- Tom Vilsack, former governor of Iowa and former U.S. secretary of agriculture
- Stacey Walker, Linn County supervisor (endorsed Graham)
- Steve Warnstadt, former state senator and intelligence officer in the Iowa Army National Guard

=== Debates ===
Host network	Date	Link(s)	Participants			
Host network	Date	Link(s)	Theresa Greenfield	Michael T. Franken	Kimberly Graham	Eddie Mauro
Iowa PBS	May 18, 2020		Present	Present	Present	Present

=== Endorsements ===
Michael Franken

Federal officials

- Chuck Hagel, former U.S. secretary of defense (2013–2015) and U.S. senator from Nebraska (1997–2009) (Republican)
Kimberly Graham

Individuals

- Paula Jean Swearengin, Democratic nominee in 2020 West Virginia U.S. Senate race

Organizations

- Association of Professional Flight Attendants
- Brand New Congress
- Sunrise Movement Cedar Rapids Chapter
- Sunrise Movement Dubuque Chapter
- Sunrise Movement University of Iowa Chapter
Theresa Greenfield

Federal officials

- Sherrod Brown, U.S. senator from Ohio
- Abby Finkenauer, U.S. representative (IA-01)
- Gabby Giffords, former U.S. representative (AZ-08) (2007–2012)
- Dave Loebsack, U.S. representative (IA-02)
- Barack Obama, former U.S. president

State officials

- Marti Anderson, state representative
- Tony Bisignano, state senator
- Joseph Bolkcom, state senator
- Robert Dvorsky, former state senator (1995–2019) and state representative (1987–1995)
- Ro Foege, former state representative (1996–2008)
- John Forbes, state representative
- Bruce Hunter, state representative
- Pam Jochum, state senator and former Iowa Senate president (2013–2017)
- Bob Kressig, state representative
- Monica Kurth, state representative
- Jim Lykam, state senator
- Mary Mascher, state representative
- Jo Oldson, state representative
- Sally Pederson, former lieutenant governor (1997–2007)
- Janet Petersen, state senator and Senate minority leader
- Amanda Ragan, state senator
- Joe Riding, former state representative (2013–2015)
- Sharon Steckman, state representative
- Kristin Sunde, state representative
- Zach Wahls, state senator
- Cindy Winckler, state representative

Individuals

- Jon Bauman, Social Security Works PAC president and former Sha Na Na member (1970–1983)
- Andy McGuire, former Iowa Democratic Party chair
- Christie Vilsack, former Iowa First Lady (1997–2007)

Unions

- American Federation of Government Employees
- American Federation of State, County and Municipal Employees Council 61
- International Association of Bridge, Structural, Ornamental and Reinforcing Iron Workers Local 89, 67, 111, 577, 21
- International Brotherhood of Electrical Workers Iowa State Conference
- International Brotherhood of Teamsters Local 238
- United Food and Commercial Workers Local 431

Organizations

- Brady Campaign
- DSCC
- EMILY's List
- End Citizens United
- Feminist Majority PAC
- Giffords
- League of Conservation Voters
- NARAL Pro-Choice America
- Population Connection

=== Polling ===
Poll source	Date(s) administered	Sample size (Note: Key: A – all adults RV – registered voters LV – likely voters V – unclear)	Margin of error	Michael Franken	Kimberly Graham	Theresa Greenfield	Eddie Mauro	Undecided
Public Policy Polling	May 5–6, 2020	849 (V)	–	12%	4%	43%	4%	36%
Emerson College	October 13–16, 2019	317 (LV)	± 5.5%	6%	4%	11%	6%	74%

=== Results ===
County results Results by county: Greenfield—70–80% Greenfield—60–70% Greenfield—50–60% Greenfield—40–50% Greenfield—<40% Franken—<40%

Democratic primary results
Party	Candidate	Votes	%
Democratic	Theresa Greenfield	132,001	47.71%
Democratic	Michael T. Franken	68,851	24.88%
Democratic	Kimberly Graham	41,554	15.02%
Democratic	Eddie Mauro	30,400	10.99%
Democratic	Cal Woods (withdrawn)	3,372	1.21%
Democratic	Write-in	514	0.19%
Total votes		276,692	100.00%

== Other candidates ==
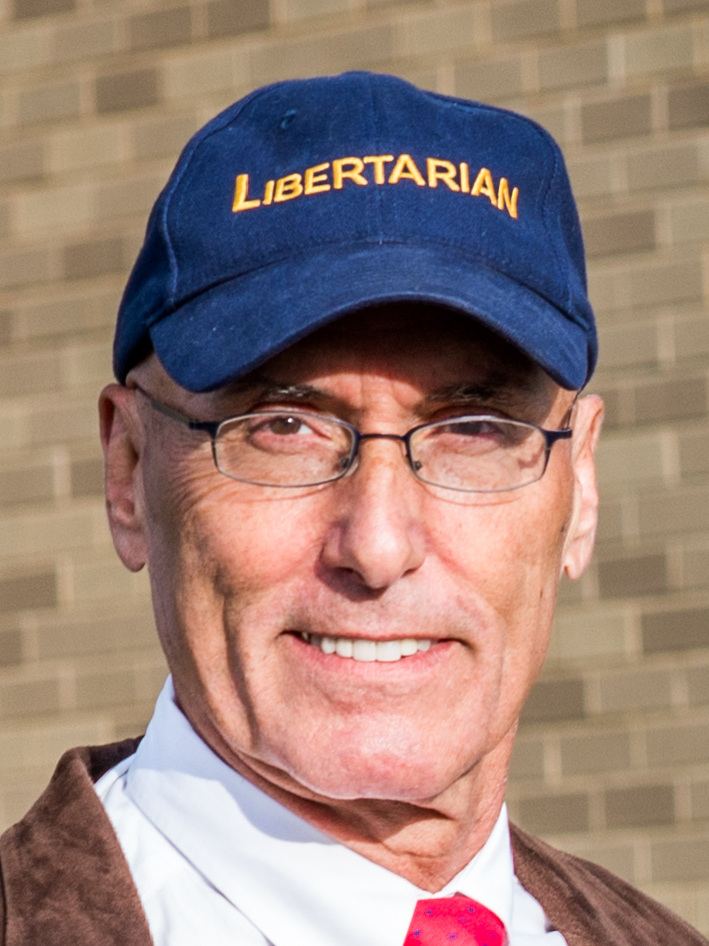
Rick Stewart, the Libertarian nominee

=== Libertarian Party ===
==== Nominee ====
- Rick Stewart, Libertarian nominee for the 2018 Iowa secretary of agriculture election and independent candidate for the 2014 United States Senate election in Iowa

=== Independents ===
==== Declared ====
- Suzanne Herzog, economist and former ER nurse

== General election ==
Major media described the campaign as one of the most likely to decide control of the Senate after the 2020 election. Polls conducted after the primary showed a close contest between Greenfield and Ernst, with neither candidate leading by more than 4 points.

Through June 2020, Greenfield had raised $11.5 million, compared to $14.6 million for Ernst but by September, Greenfield had pulled ahead, raising $40.0 million compared to $21.6 million for Ernst. The race was expected to be the most expensive in the state's history, and the second most expensive Senate race in the United States, after the 2020 United States Senate election in North Carolina, in which Cal Cunningham challenged Thom Tillis.

=== Debate ===
Host	Date & time	Link(s)	Participants	
Host	Date & time	Link(s)	Joni Ernst (R)	Theresa Greenfield (D)
Iowa Press Debates	September 28, 2020		Present	Present

=== Predictions ===
Source	Ranking	As of
The Cook Political Report	Tossup	October 29, 2020
Inside Elections	Tossup	October 28, 2020
Sabato's Crystal Ball	Lean R	November 2, 2020
Politico	Tossup	November 2, 2020
Daily Kos	Tossup	October 30, 2020
RCP	Tossup	October 23, 2020
DDHQ	Tossup	November 3, 2020
538	Tossup	November 2, 2020
Economist	Tossup	November 2, 2020

=== Additional general election endorsements ===
Joni Ernst (R)

Organizations

- Campaign for Working Families
- Huck PAC
Theresa Greenfield (D)

Federal officials

- Joe Biden, 47th vice president of the United States, 2020 Democratic nominee for president
- Kirsten Gillibrand, U.S. senator from New York
- Elizabeth Warren, U.S. senator from Massachusetts

Unions

- National Education Association
- United Auto Workers

Newspapers

- Cedar Rapids Gazette
- Des Moines Register
- Dubuque Telegraph Herald
- Iowa City Press-Citizen
- Quad City Times

Organizations

- Center for Biological Diversity
- Climate Hawks Vote
- Council for a Livable World
- Democracy for America
- Everytown for Gun Safety
- J Street PAC
- National Committee to Preserve Social Security and Medicare
- Natural Resources Defense Council Action Fund

=== Polling ===
==== Graphical summary ====
View source data.

==== Aggregate polling ====
Theresa Greenfield vs. Joni Ernst
Source of poll aggregation	Dates administered	Dates updated	Theresa Greenfield	Joni Ernst	Other/Undecided (Note: Calculated by taking the difference of 100% and all other candidates combined.)	Margin
Real Clear Politics	November 2, 2020	November 3, 2020	45.8%	47.2%	7.0%	Ernst +1.4
270 to Win	November 2, 2020	November 3, 2020	46.6%	47.0%	6.4%	Ernst +0.4

Poll source	Date(s) administered	Sample size	Margin of error	Joni Ernst (R)	Theresa Greenfield (D)	Other	Undecided
Public Policy Polling (D)	November 1–2, 2020	871 (V)	–	47%	48%	–	5%
Change Research (D)	October 29 – November 1, 2020	1,084 (LV)	± 3.2%	47%	48%	3% (Note: Stewart (L) with 2%; "Don't recall" with 1%; Herzog (I) and would not vote with 0%)	1%
Civiqs/Daily Kos	October 29 – November 1, 2020	853 (LV)	± 3.7%	47%	50%	1% (Note: Stewart (L) with 1%; Herzog (I) and "Someone else" with 0%)	1%
Data for Progress (D)	October 27 – November 1, 2020	951 (LV)	± 3.2%	45%	49%	6% (Note: Herzog (I) with 3%; Stewart (L) with 2%; "Other candidate or write-in" with 1%)	–
Emerson College	October 29–31, 2020	604 (LV)	± 3.9%	48% (Note: With voters who lean towards a given candidate)	51%	2% (Note: "Someone else" with 2%)	–
InsiderAdvantage (R) (Note: Poll sponsored by The Center for American Greatness, a pro-Trump organization.)	October 30, 2020	400 (LV)	± 4.9%	51%	45%	2% (Note: Herzog (I) and Stewart (L) with 1%)	3%
Selzer & Co./Des Moines Register	October 26–29, 2020	814 (LV)	± 3.4%	46%	42%	4% (Note: "Refused" with 4%; "Someone else" and "Undecided/do not remember" with 3%; would not vote with 1%)	7%
Quinnipiac University	October 23–27, 2020	1,225 (LV)	± 2.8%	48%	46%	1% (Note: "Someone else" with 1%)	4%
RABA Research	October 21–24, 2020	693 (LV)	± 4%	45%	51%	–	–
Emerson College	October 19–21, 2020	435 (LV)	± 4.7%	51%	46%	3% (Note: "Someone else" with 3%)	–
RMG Research	October 15–21, 2020	800 (LV)	± 3.5%	43% (Note: Standard VI response)	46%	3% (Note: "Someone else" with 3%)	7%
RMG Research	October 15–21, 2020	800 (LV)	± 3.5%	41% (Note: Results generated with high Democratic turnout model)	48%	3%	7%
RMG Research	October 15–21, 2020	800 (LV)	± 3.5%	45% (Note: Results generated with high Republican turnout model)	45%	3%	7%
Siena College/NYT Upshot	October 18–20, 2020	753 (LV)	± 3.9%	45%	44%	6% (Note: Herzog (I) and Stewart (L) with 2%; "Someone else" and would not vote with 1%)	6%
Insider Advantage (R)	October 18–19, 2020	400 (LV)	± 4.9%	43%	48%	5% (Note: Stewart (L) with 5%; Herzog (I) with 0%)	3%
Monmouth University	October 15–19, 2020	501 (RV)	± 4.4%	47%	47%	3% (Note: Herzog (I), "No one" and Stewart (L) with 1%; "Other" with 0%)	2%
Monmouth University	October 15–19, 2020	501 (LV) (Note: With a likely voter turnout model featuring higher turnout than in the 2016 presidential election)	± 4.4%	47%	49%	–	–
Monmouth University	October 15–19, 2020	501 (LV) (Note: With a likely voter turnout model featuring lower turnout than in the 2016 presidential election)	± 4.4%	45%	51%	–	–
Data for Progress (D)	October 8–11, 2020	822 (LV)	± 3.4%	43%	47%	3% (Note: Stewart (L) with 2%; Herzog (I) with 1%; "Other" with 0%)	6%
YouGov/CBS	October 6–9, 2020	1,022 (LV)	± 3.5%	43%	47%	2% (Note: "Someone else" with 2%)	8%
Opinion Insight (R) (Note: Poll sponsored by The American Action Forum, which is a 501 organization which usually supports Republican candidates.)	October 5–8, 2020	800 (LV)	± 3.46%	47%	45%	4% (Note: Would not vote with 1%; "Someone else" with 0%)	4%
Civiqs/Daily Kos	October 3–6, 2020	756 (LV)	± 3.9%	46%	49%	3% (Note: Stewart (L) with 2%; Herzog (I) with 1%; "Someone else" with 0%)	3%
Quinnipiac University	October 1–5, 2020	1,205 (LV)	± 2.8%	45%	50%	1%	4%
Data for Progress (D)	September 23–28, 2020	743 (LV)	± 3.6%	42%	44%	2% (Note: Herzog (I) and Stewart (L) with 1%)	12%
Data for Progress (D)	September 23–28, 2020	743 (LV)	± 3.6%	45% (Note: If the only candidates were Ernst and Greenfield)	46%	–	9%
Hart Research Associates (D) (Note: Poll sponsored by The Human Rights Campaign, which has endorsed Biden prior to this poll's sampling period.)	September 24–27, 2020	400 (LV)	± 4.9%	48%	48%	–	–
RABA Research	September 23–26, 2020	780 (LV)	± 4%	39%	51%	–	–
Monmouth University	September 18–22, 2020	402 (RV)	± 4.9%	47%	47%	1% (Note: Stewart (L) with 1%; Herzog (I), "Other" and "No one" with 0%)	4%
Monmouth University	September 18–22, 2020	402 (LV)	± 4.9%	46%	49%	1% (Note: Stewart (L) with 1; Herzog (I) with 0%)	4%
Monmouth University	September 18–22, 2020	402 (LV)	± 4.9%	47%	48%	1%	4%
Siena College/NYT Upshot	September 16–22, 2020	501 (LV)	± 4.99%	40%	42%	5% (Note: Herzog (I) and Stewart (L) with 2%; would not vote with 1%; "someone else" with 0%)	14%
Selzer/Des Moines Register	September 14–17, 2020	658 (LV)	± 3.8%	42%	45%	5% (Note: "Someone else" with 3%; would not vote with 2%)	7%
Fabrizio Ward (R)/Hart Research Associates (D) (Note: Poll sponsored by AARP.)	August 30 – September 5, 2020	800 (LV)	± 3.5%	50%	45%	1% (Note: Would not vote with 1%)	4%
Opinion Insight (R)	August 30 – September 2, 2020	800 (LV)	± 3.46%	49%	43%	1% (Note: Would not vote with 1%)	7%
Public Policy Polling (D)	August 13–14, 2020	729 (V)	± 4.1%	45%	48%	–	8%
Monmouth University	July 30 – August 3, 2020	401 (RV)	± 4.9%	48%	45%	3% (Note: Stewart (L) with 2%; Herzog (I) with 1%)	3%
Monmouth University	July 30 – August 3, 2020	401 (LV)	± 4.9%	48%	47%	3%	3%
Monmouth University	July 30 – August 3, 2020	401 (LV)	± 4.9%	48%	47%	3% (Note: Stewart (L) with 2%; Herzog (I) with 1%)	2%
Data for Progress (D)	July 24 – August 2, 2020	1,101 (LV)	± 3.2%	43%	45%	11% (Note: "No one" with 11%)	–
RMG Research	July 27–30, 2020	500 (RV)	± 4.5%	36%	40%	–	24%
Spry Strategies (R) (Note: This poll's sponsor is the American Principles Project, a 501 that supports the Republican Party.)	July 11–16, 2020	701 (LV)	± 3.7%	43%	45%	6% (Note: "Another candidate" with 6%)	7%
GQR Research (D) (Note: Poll sponsored by the End Citizens United, which has only supported Democratic candidates who are against the landmark Citizens United Supreme Court ruling.)	June 23–28, 2020	800 (LV)	± 3.5%	47%	49%	–	4%
Selzer/Des Moines Register	June 7–10, 2020	674 (LV)	± 3.8%	43%	46%	–	11%
Civiqs/Daily Kos	June 6–8, 2020	865 (RV)	± 3.8%	45%	48%	–	6%
Public Policy Polling (D) (Note: Poll sponsored by Emily's List, an organization that supports Democratic female candidates.)	June 3–4, 2020	963 (V)	± 3.4%	43%	45%	–	12%
Public Policy Polling (D)	April 30 – May 1, 2020	1,222 (V)	± 2.8%	43%	42%	–	14%
Public Policy Polling (D)	December 13–15, 2019	944 (V)	± 3.4%	47%	41%	–	12%
Emerson College	October 13–16, 2019	888 (RV)	± 3.2%	47%	40%	–	14%
Lake Research Partners (D) (Note: Poll sponsored by the Eddie Mauro campaign)	April 24–29, 2019	500 (LV)	± 4.4%	56%	34%	–	–

Hypothetical polling

with Eddie Mauro

Poll source	Date(s) administered	Sample size	Margin of error	Joni Ernst (R)	Eddie Mauro (D)	Undecided
RABA Research/Eddie Mauro	May 7–9, 2020	632 (LV)	± 3.9%	42%	42%	–
Lake Research Partners (D)	April 24–29, 2019	500 (LV)	± 4.4%	58%	33%	–
Lake Research Partners (D)	April 24–29, 2019	500 (LV)	± 4.4%	49% (Note: Response after pollster addresses respondents with talking points about Ernst and Mauro)	44%	–

with Joni Ernst and generic Democrat

Poll source	Date(s) administered	Sample size	Margin of error	Joni Ernst (R)	Generic Democrat	Undecided
Public Policy Polling	April 29–30, 2019	780 (V)	± 3.5%	48%	44%	–
Public Policy Polling (D) (Note: Poll sponsored by Save My Care, a pro-Affordable Care Act organization)	June 30 – July 1, 2017	784 (V)	± 3.6%	48%	41%	12%

with Joni Ernst and Generic Opponent

Poll source	Date(s) administered	Sample size	Margin of error	Joni Ernst (R)	Generic Opponent	Other	Undecided
Des Moines Register/Selzer & Co.	March 2–5, 2020	667 (LV)	± 3.8%	41%	31%	3% (Note: Would not vote with 3%)	26% (Note: "Would consider voting for someone else" with 20%; "unsure" with 6%)

with generic Republican and generic Democrat

Poll source	Date(s) administered	Sample size	Margin of error	Generic Republican	Generic Democrat	Undecided
Lake Research Partners (D)	April 24–29, 2019	500 (LV)	± 4.4%	45%	41%	–

=== Results ===
State senate district results Ernst: 40–50% 50–60% 60–70% 70–80% Greenfield: 40–50% 50–60% 60–70% 70–80%

2020 United States Senate election in Iowa
Party	Candidate	Votes	%	±%
Republican	Joni Ernst (incumbent)	864,997	51.74%	−0.36%
Democratic	Theresa Greenfield	754,859	45.15%	+1.39%
Libertarian	Rick Stewart	36,961	2.21%	+1.48%
Independent	Suzanne Herzog	13,800	0.83%	N/A
Write-in		1,211	0.07%	–0.03%
Total votes		1,671,828	100.0%	
Republican hold				

==== By county ====
County	Joni Ernst Republican		Theresa Greenfield Democratic		Rick Stewart Libertarian		Suzanne Herzog Independent		Write-in		Margin		Total votes
County	#	%	#	%	#	%	#	%	#	%	#	%	Total votes
Adair	2,809	67.78	1,207	29.13	89	2.15	36	0.87	3	0.07	1,602	38.66	4,144
Adams	1,497	69.34	594	27.51	46	2.13	19	0.88	3	0.14	903	41.82	2,159
Allamakee	4,478	61.04	2,602	35.47	175	2.39	80	1.09	1	0.01	1,876	25.57	7,336
Appanoose	4,189	65.60	1,956	30.63	168	2.63	71	1.11	2	0.03	2,233	34.97	6,386
Audubon	2,188	64.89	1,092	32.38	70	2.08	21	0.62	1	0.03	1,096	32.50	3,372
Benton	8,830	60.93	5,202	35.90	331	2.28	120	0.83	9	0.06	3,628	25.03	14,492
Black Hawk	29,222	44.27	34,963	52.96	1,301	1.97	490	0.74	37	0.06	-5,741	-8.70	66,013
Boone	8,315	54.74	6,316	41.58	385	2.53	167	1.10	7	0.05	1,999	13.16	15,190
Bremer	8,196	56.72	5,911	40.91	254	1.76	84	0.58	5	0.03	2,285	15.81	14,450
Buchanan	6,063	56.64	4,292	40.10	248	2.32	96	0.90	5	0.05	1,771	16.55	10,704
Buena Vista	4,724	59.09	3,022	37.80	166	2.08	75	0.94	7	0.09	1,702	21.29	7,994
Butler	5,291	66.06	2,474	30.89	173	2.16	69	0.86	2	0.02	2,817	35.17	8,009
Calhoun	3,513	67.40	1,531	29.37	129	2.48	32	0.61	7	0.13	1,982	38.03	5,212
Carroll	7,245	64.91	3,580	32.07	230	2.06	96	0.86	11	0.10	3,665	32.83	11,162
Cass	4,725	65.95	2,259	31.53	120	1.67	54	0.75	7	0.10	2,466	34.42	7,165
Cedar	5,935	56.30	4,300	40.79	226	2.14	74	0.70	6	0.06	1,635	15.51	10,541
Cerro Gordo	11,339	48.19	11,534	49.02	430	1.83	211	0.90	16	0.07	-195	-0.83	23,530
Cherokee	4,214	65.59	2,002	31.16	138	2.15	67	1.04	4	0.06	2,212	34.43	6,425
Chickasaw	4,024	61.16	2,324	35.32	159	2.42	71	1.08	2	0.03	1,700	25.84	6,580
Clarke	2,906	63.05	1,520	32.98	119	2.58	60	1.30	4	0.09	1,386	30.07	4,609
Clay	5,716	64.46	2,861	32.26	193	2.18	89	1.00	9	0.10	2,855	32.19	8,868
Clayton	5,845	61.37	3,434	36.06	157	1.65	82	0.86	6	0.06	2,411	25.31	9,524
Clinton	12,559	51.57	10,942	44.93	635	2.61	200	0.82	15	0.06	1,617	6.64	24,351
Crawford	4,424	63.12	2,336	33.33	160	2.28	80	1.14	9	0.13	2,088	29.79	7,009
Dallas	28,727	51.69	25,427	45.75	1,006	1.81	381	0.69	33	0.06	3,300	5.94	55,574
Davis	2,728	67.51	1,167	28.88	112	2.77	32	0.79	2	0.05	1,561	38.63	4,041
Decatur	2,439	65.21	1,165	31.15	90	2.41	43	1.15	3	0.08	1,274	34.06	3,740
Delaware	6,454	64.96	3,235	32.56	172	1.73	71	0.71	4	0.04	3,219	32.40	9,936
Des Moines	9,468	48.27	9,296	47.39	591	3.01	232	1.18	29	0.15	172	0.88	19,616
Dickinson	7,149	63.92	3,791	33.90	174	1.56	66	0.59	4	0.04	3,358	30.03	11,184
Dubuque	26,034	49.05	25,433	47.91	1,148	2.16	428	0.81	37	0.07	601	1.13	53,080
Emmet	2,965	61.81	1,637	34.13	147	3.06	47	0.98	1	0.02	1,328	27.68	4,797
Fayette	5,865	58.06	3,912	38.73	229	2.27	89	0.88	7	0.07	1,953	19.33	10,102
Floyd	4,181	52.45	3,498	43.88	187	2.35	98	1.23	8	0.10	683	8.57	7,972
Franklin	3,270	64.55	1,639	32.35	100	1.97	50	0.99	7	0.14	1,631	32.20	5,066
Fremont	2,563	67.31	1,099	28.86	89	2.34	56	1.47	1	0.03	1,464	38.45	3,808
Greene	3,063	61.36	1,784	35.74	104	2.08	39	0.78	2	0.04	1,279	25.62	4,992
Grundy	4,900	67.90	2,120	29.38	154	2.13	38	0.53	5	0.07	2,780	38.52	7,217
Guthrie	4,103	64.86	2,000	31.62	162	2.56	56	0.89	5	0.08	2,103	33.24	6,326
Hamilton	4,679	59.42	2,913	36.99	190	2.41	84	1.07	9	0.11	1,766	22.43	7,875
Hancock	4,004	65.86	1,881	30.94	130	2.14	60	0.99	5	0.08	2,123	34.92	6,080
Hardin	5,639	63.80	2,920	33.04	195	2.21	84	0.95	1	0.01	2,719	30.76	8,839
Harrison	5,059	63.10	2,574	32.10	253	3.16	118	1.47	14	0.17	2,485	30.99	8,018
Henry	5,875	60.12	3,457	35.38	310	3.17	116	1.19	14	0.14	2,418	24.74	9,772
Howard	2,716	55.36	2,014	41.05	118	2.41	58	1.18	0	0.00	702	14.31	4,906
Humboldt	3,671	69.74	1,443	27.41	108	2.05	40	0.76	2	0.04	2,228	42.33	5,264
Ida	2,757	72.23	964	25.26	66	1.73	28	0.73	2	0.05	1,793	46.97	3,817
Iowa	5,794	60.13	3,541	36.75	205	2.13	84	0.87	11	0.11	2,253	23.38	9,635
Jackson	6,175	56.58	4,249	38.94	366	3.35	118	1.08	5	0.05	1,926	17.65	10,913
Jasper	11,405	56.95	7,905	39.47	531	2.65	167	0.83	18	0.09	3,500	17.48	20,026
Jefferson	4,008	45.50	4,547	51.62	163	1.85	80	0.91	10	0.11	-539	-6.12	8,808
Johnson	23,773	28.77	57,063	69.06	1,382	1.67	373	0.45	42	0.05	-33,290	-40.29	82,633
Jones	6,320	57.97	4,237	38.86	273	2.50	68	0.62	4	0.04	2,083	19.11	10,902
Keokuk	3,565	68.39	1,489	28.56	101	1.94	53	1.02	5	0.10	2,076	39.82	5,213
Kossuth	5,957	66.14	2,799	31.08	193	2.14	57	0.63	0	0.00	3,158	35.07	9,006
Lee	8,489	51.29	7,445	44.98	485	2.93	122	0.74	11	0.07	1,044	6.31	16,552
Linn	53,248	42.10	69,125	54.66	3,188	2.52	815	0.64	90	0.07	-15,877	-12.55	126,466
Louisa	3,259	61.97	1,804	34.30	141	2.68	51	0.97	4	0.08	1,455	27.67	5,259
Lucas	3,105	68.32	1,302	28.65	99	2.18	36	0.79	3	0.07	1,803	39.67	4,545
Lyon	5,522	81.80	1,073	15.89	104	1.54	50	0.74	2	0.03	4,449	65.90	6,751
Madison	6,245	64.25	3,168	32.59	218	2.24	86	0.88	3	0.03	3,077	31.66	9,720
Mahaska	7,860	70.00	2,969	26.44	273	2.43	118	1.05	8	0.07	4,891	43.56	11,228
Marion	12,211	64.06	6,269	32.89	423	2.22	144	0.76	15	0.08	5,942	31.17	19,062
Marshall	9,057	50.68	8,187	45.81	442	2.47	165	0.92	21	0.12	870	4.87	17,872
Mills	5,347	65.54	2,544	31.18	177	2.17	82	1.01	8	0.10	2,803	34.36	8,158
Mitchell	3,347	57.69	2,282	39.33	124	2.14	49	0.84	0	0.00	1,065	18.36	5,802
Monona	3,054	65.47	1,455	31.19	108	2.32	39	0.84	9	0.19	1,599	34.28	4,665
Monroe	2,742	68.40	1,148	28.64	84	2.10	34	0.85	1	0.02	1,594	39.76	4,009
Montgomery	3,633	68.53	1,520	28.67	98	1.85	46	0.87	4	0.08	2,113	39.86	5,301
Muscatine	10,278	50.28	9,381	45.89	570	2.79	199	0.97	13	0.06	897	4.39	20,441
O'Brien	5,675	76.05	1,640	21.98	105	1.41	38	0.51	4	0.05	4,035	54.07	7,462
Osceola	2,525	77.38	657	20.13	49	1.50	31	0.95	1	0.03	1,868	57.25	3,263
Page	5,152	69.27	2,067	27.79	138	1.86	78	1.05	3	0.04	3,085	41.48	7,438
Palo Alto	3,113	63.12	1,677	34.00	106	2.15	36	0.73	0	0.00	1,436	29.12	4,932
Plymouth	10,145	72.26	3,587	25.55	219	1.56	77	0.55	11	0.08	6,558	46.71	14,039
Pocahontas	2,641	69.87	1,003	26.53	91	2.41	39	1.03	6	0.16	1,638	43.33	3,780
Polk	106,443	41.54	142,328	55.54	5,313	2.07	1,985	0.77	188	0.07	-35,885	-14.00	256,257
Pottawattamie	24,720	54.85	18,520	41.10	1,269	2.82	524	1.16	32	0.07	6,200	13.76	45,065
Poweshiek	5,361	53.38	4,381	43.62	202	2.01	91	0.91	8	0.08	980	9.76	10,043
Ringgold	1,870	69.36	732	27.15	75	2.78	16	0.59	3	0.11	1,138	42.21	2,696
Sac	3,849	70.17	1,440	26.25	129	2.35	60	1.09	7	0.13	2,409	43.92	5,485
Scott	42,941	46.88	45,751	49.94	2,139	2.33	709	0.77	66	0.07	-2,810	-3.07	91,606
Shelby	4,489	67.06	1,989	29.71	156	2.33	57	0.85	3	0.04	2,500	37.35	6,694
Sioux	15,785	83.54	2,828	14.97	192	1.02	81	0.43	9	0.05	12,957	68.57	18,895
Story	20,750	41.08	28,216	55.86	1,133	2.24	370	0.73	44	0.09	-7,466	-14.78	50,513
Tama	5,090	56.74	3,588	40.00	205	2.29	79	0.88	8	0.09	1,502	16.74	8,970
Taylor	2,337	72.80	762	23.74	83	2.59	28	0.87	0	0.00	1,575	49.07	3,210
Union	3,820	62.38	2,051	33.49	172	2.81	76	1.24	5	0.08	1,769	28.89	6,124
Van Buren	2,583	68.84	1,065	28.38	75	2.00	28	0.75	1	0.03	1,518	40.46	3,752
Wapello	8,464	55.15	6,344	41.33	394	2.57	132	0.86	14	0.09	2,120	13.81	15,348
Warren	17,276	56.27	12,478	40.64	692	2.25	234	0.76	23	0.07	4,798	15.63	30,703
Washington	6,773	58.12	4,519	38.78	262	2.25	95	0.82	5	0.04	2,254	19.34	11,654
Wayne	2,186	71.55	784	25.66	53	1.73	28	0.92	4	0.13	1,402	45.89	3,055
Webster	10,195	57.81	6,845	38.81	403	2.29	173	0.98	19	0.11	3,350	19.00	17,635
Winnebago	3,336	56.29	2,361	39.84	153	2.58	72	1.21	4	0.07	975	16.45	5,926
Winneshiek	6,039	50.49	5,581	46.66	218	1.82	118	0.99	4	0.03	458	3.83	11,960
Woodbury	24,175	54.27	18,674	41.92	994	2.23	629	1.41	72	0.16	5,501	12.35	44,544
Worth	2,425	55.40	1,803	41.19	98	2.24	46	1.05	5	0.11	622	14.21	4,377
Wright	3,889	62.85	2,063	33.34	158	2.55	76	1.23	2	0.03	1,826	29.51	6,188
Totals	864,997	51.74	754,859	45.15	36,961	2.21	13,800	0.83	1,211	0.07	110,138	6.59	1,671,828

Counties that flipped from Democratic to Republican

- Clinton (largest municipality: Clinton)
- Des Moines (largest municipality: Burlington)
- Dubuque (largest municipality: Dubuque)
- Floyd (largest municipality: Charles City)
- Howard (largest municipality: Cresco)
- Lee (largest municipality: Fort Madison)
- Worth (largest municipality: Northwood)

Counties that flipped from Republican to Democratic

- Scott (largest municipality: Davenport)

==== By congressional district ====
Ernst carried all four congressional districts, including one that elected a Democrat.

District	Joni Ernst Republican		Theresa Greenfield Democratic		Rick Stewart Libertarian		Suzanne Herzog Independent		Write-in		Margin		Total votes	Representative (2020)
District	#	%	#	%	#	%	#	%	#	%	#	%	Total votes	Representative (2020)
1st district	206,559	49.48	197,792	47.72	9,454	2.26	3,231	0.77	267	0.06	8,767	2.10	417,483	Ashley Hinson
2nd district	199,741	49.17	193,588	47.65	9,426	2.32	3,197	0.79	295	0.07	6,153	1.51	406,247	Mariannette Miller-Meeks
3rd district	221,267	48.75	218,756	48.20	9,747	2.15	3,757	0.83	321	0.07	2,511	0.55	453,848	Cindy Axne
4th district	237,430	60.22	144,543	36.66	8,334	2.11	3,615	0.92	328	0.08	92,887	23.56	394,250	Randy Feenstra
Totals	864,997	51.74	754,859	45.15	36,961	2.21	13,800	0.83	1,211	0.07	110,138	6.59	1,671,828	

== See also ==
- 2020 Iowa elections

== Notes ==
Partisan clients

Voter samples
