= Theresa Greenfield =

American politician from Iowa

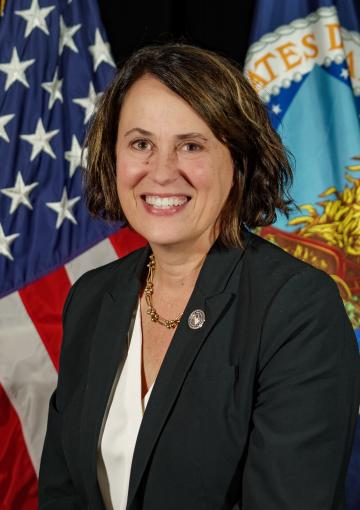
- Official portrait, 2021

Personal details
- Born: October 20, 1963 (age 62) Bricelyn, Minnesota, U.S.
- Party: Democratic
- Children: 4
- Education: Iowa Lakes Community College (attended); Iowa State University (attended); Minnesota State University, Mankato (BA)

Theresa Greenfield (born October 20, 1963) is an American businesswoman, government official, and former political candidate. She was the Democratic nominee for the 2020 United States Senate election in Iowa, losing to incumbent Republican Joni Ernst.

== Early life and education ==
Greenfield was born and raised in Bricelyn, Minnesota, a small city near the Iowa–Minnesota border. She was one of five children. Her parents raised hogs and grew crops on a small farm, and her father was also a crop dusting pilot.

Greenfield took courses at Iowa Lakes Community College and Iowa State University before graduating from Minnesota State University, Mankato in 1987 with a bachelor's degree in design and human development.

== Business career ==
Greenfield worked as an urban planner in Minnesota.

In 2005, Greenfield joined Rottlund Homes, a corporate real estate company based in Minnesota. After being director of real estate in the Minnesota division, she became president of the Iowa division in 2007. According to Greenfield's 2020 campaign, Greenfield was laid off after the company failed following the 2008 financial crisis. From 2012 to 2019, Greenfield was president of the Des Moines–based real estate firm Colby Interests.

In 2025, Greenfield became Executive Director of Invest DSM, a community development organization based in Des Moines.

== Political campaigns ==
=== 2018 U.S. House election ===
In July 2017, Greenfield announced her candidacy for the 2018 Democratic nomination in Iowa's 3rd congressional district. She withdrew from the race in March 2018 after learning her campaign manager had falsified some of the 1,790 required signatures to qualify her for the ballot. Her campaign tried to collect a new set of signatures in the 24 hours before the filing deadline, but was only able to acquire 1,592 valid signatures.

=== 2020 U.S. Senate election ===
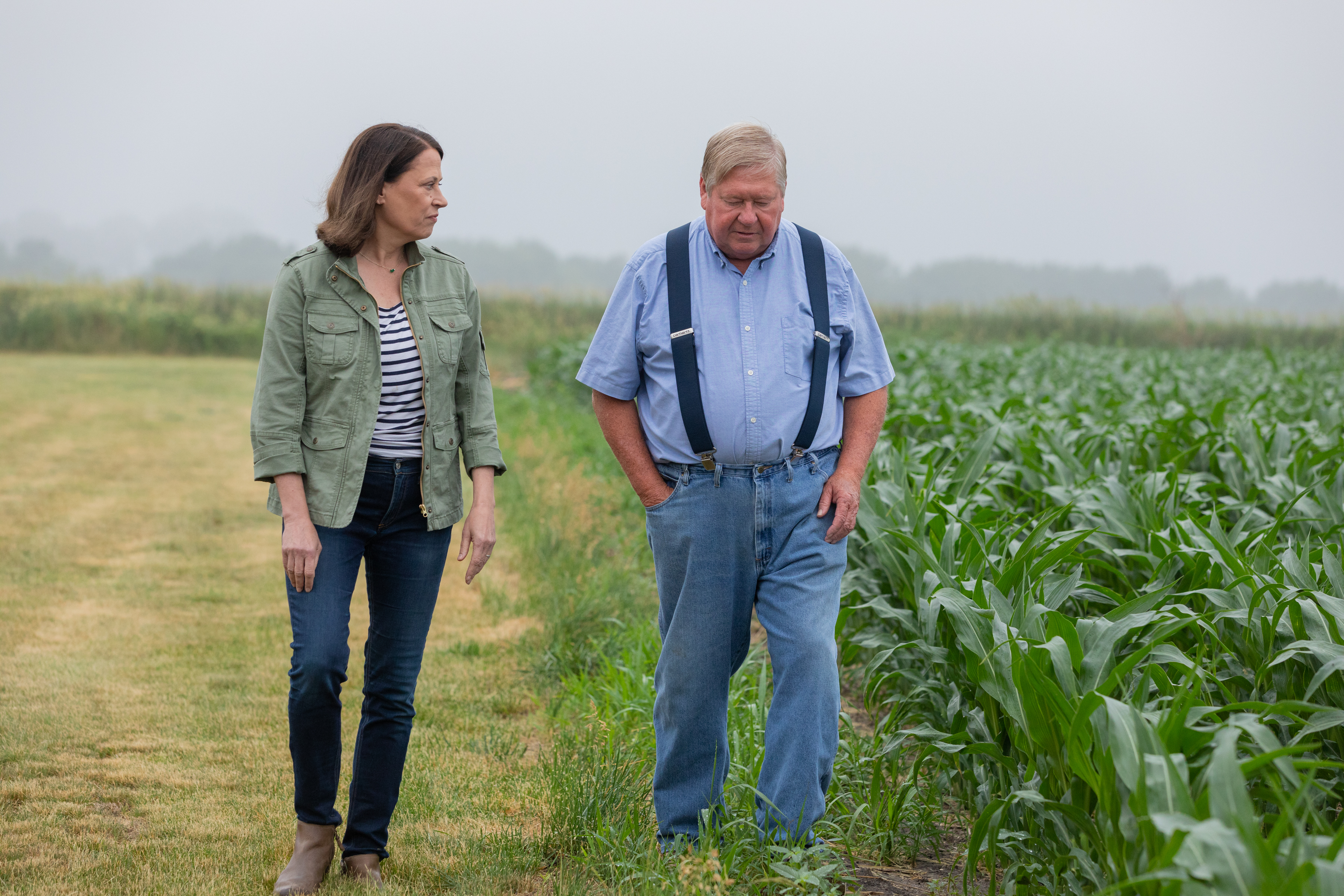
Greenfield campaigning in a cornfield

On June 3, 2019, Greenfield declared her candidacy for the Senate seat held by first-term senator Joni Ernst. On June 2, 2020, she won the Democratic primary with 48% of the vote, defeating three other major candidates, including Michael T. Franken.

Major media described the race as one of the most likely to decide control of the Senate after the 2020 election. The election was considered competitive, and attracted over $240 million in advertising, according to Advertising Analytics.

In the general election on November 3, 2020, Greenfield lost to Ernst, 45% to 52%.

== Department of Agriculture ==
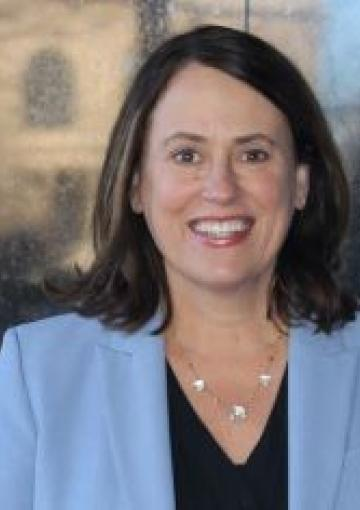
Greenfield's official Department of Agriculture portrait

In 2021, President Joe Biden appointed Greenfield as Iowa director for the U.S. Department of Agriculture's Rural Development program. Greenfield worked under U.S. Secretary of Agriculture Tom Vilsack, a former Governor of Iowa.

== Personal life ==
Greenfield was married to Rodney Wirtjes, who was a journeyman lineworker and a member of the International Brotherhood of Electrical Workers. They married in 1985. They settled in Buffalo Center, Iowa in the 1980s. In 1988, Wirtjes was killed in a work accident. At the time Greenfield was 24 years old, with a one-year-old son, and was pregnant with her second son who was born five months later.

Greenfield later married Steve Miller, with whom she had two more children.

== Electoral history ==
2020 United States Senate election in Iowa, Democratic primary
Party	Candidate	Votes	%
Democratic	Theresa Greenfield	131,985	47.71%
Democratic	Michael T. Franken	68,843	24.88%
Democratic	Kimberly Graham	41,547	15.02%
Democratic	Eddie Mauro	30,396	10.99%
Democratic	Cal Woods (withdrawn)	3,371	1.21%
Democratic	Write-In	512	0.19%
Total votes		276,654	100.0%

United States Senate election in Iowa, 2020
Party	Candidate	Votes	%
Republican	Joni Ernst (incumbent)	864,997	51.8
Democratic	Theresa Greenfield	754,859	45.2
Libertarian	Rick Stewart	36,961	2.2
Independent	Suzanne Herzog	13,800	0.8
Write-in		1,211	0.1
Total votes		1,671,828	100.00%

Party political offices
Preceded by Bruce Braley	Democratic nominee for U.S. Senator from Iowa (Class 2); 2020	Succeeded by Josh Turek
