= Zeltser =

Zeltser or Seltser is a Jewish surname. Notable people with the surname include:

- Mark Zeltser (born 1947), Soviet-born American pianist
- Vladimir Zeltser (1905–1937), Soviet historian

== See also ==
- Seltzer (surname)
- Death of Andrei Zeltser
