= Salz =

Salz is a German word meaning salt and may refer to:

== Places ==
- Salzburg, a city in Austria
- Salzburg (state), Austria
- Salz, Rhineland-Palatinate, municipality in Rhineland-Palatinate, Germany
- Salz, Bavaria, town in the district of Rhön-Grabfeld in Bavaria, Germany
- Salz (Freiensteinau), district of Freiensteinau, Hesse

== People ==
- Anthony Salz (born 1950), British solicitor
- Rich Salz, original author of InterNetNews

== Rivers ==
- Salz (river), small river in Hesse, Germany
- Salz, the occasional German name of the river Sajó in central Slovakia and northeastern Hungary

== See also ==
- Selz (disambiguation)
- Sulz (disambiguation)
