= Sulz =

Sulz may refer to:

== Austria ==
- Sulz, Vorarlberg, a municipality the district of Feldkirch, Vorarlberg
- Sulz im Weinviertel, a town the district of Gänserndorf, Lower Austria

== Germany ==
- Sulz am Neckar, a town in Baden-Württemberg
- Sulz (Altmühl), a river of Bavaria, Germany

== Switzerland ==
- Soulce, a former municipality in the canton of Jura, formerly known as Sulz
- Sulz, Aargau, a former municipality in the canton of Aargau
- Sulz, Lucerne a former municipality in the canton of Lucerne

== Ukraine ==
- Sulz, Ukraine, village in the Mykolaiv Raion within the Mykolaiv Oblast

== See also ==
- Salz (disambiguation)
- Selz (disambiguation)
- Sülz (disambiguation)
