= Selzer =

Selzer is a surname. Notable people with this surname include:

- Ann Selzer, American political pollster
- Clemens Selzer, Austrian track cyclist
- Edward Selzer, American cartoon producer
- Ken Selzer, American politician
- Milton Selzer, American actor
- Peter Selzer, German race walker
- Richard Selzer, American surgeon

== See also ==
- Seltzer (disambiguation)
- Sälzer
- Zeltser, a surname
