= Sülz (disambiguation) =

Sülz is a neighborhood of the city of Cologne, Germany.

Sülz may also refer to:

- Sülz (river), a small river in North Rhine-Westphalia, Germany
- Sülz (Silesia), a village in Silesia

== See also ==
- Sulz (disambiguation)
