= Joni Ernst =

American politician and military officer (born 1970)

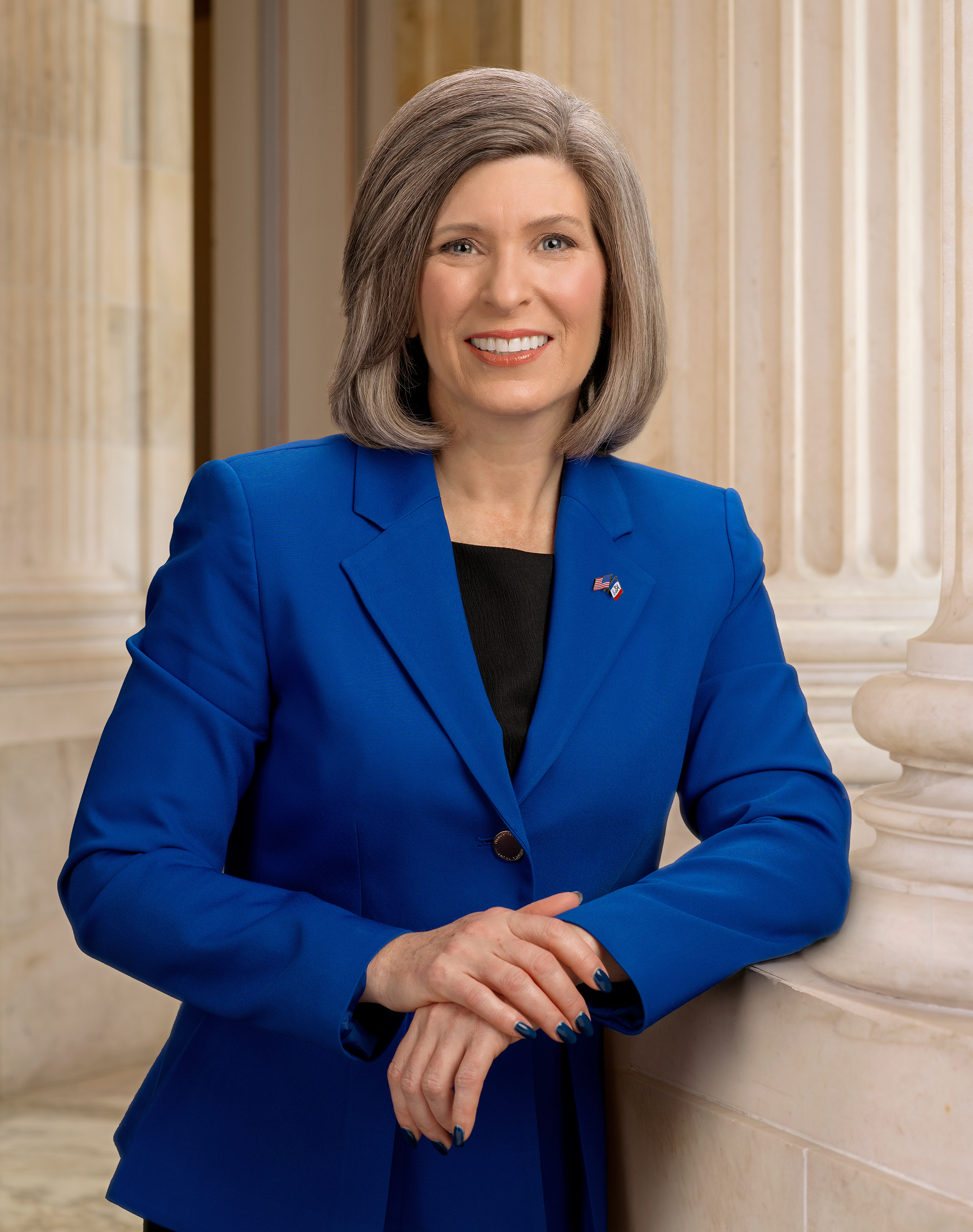
- Official portrait, 2020

Chair of the Senate Small Business Committee
- Incumbent
- Assumed office January 3, 2025
- Preceded by: Jeanne Shaheen

United States Senator from Iowa
- Incumbent
- Assumed office January 3, 2015 Serving with Chuck Grassley
- Preceded by: Tom Harkin
Past Senate positions
Ranking Member of the Senate Small Business Committee
In office January 3, 2023 – January 3, 2025
Preceded by	Rand Paul
Succeeded by	Ed Markey
Chair of the Senate Republican Policy Committee
In office January 3, 2023 – January 3, 2025
Leader	Mitch McConnell
Preceded by	Roy Blunt
Succeeded by	Shelley Moore Capito
Vice Chair of the Senate Republican Conference
In office January 3, 2019 – January 3, 2023
Leader	Mitch McConnell
Preceded by	Roy Blunt
Succeeded by	Shelley Moore Capito

Member of the Iowa Senate from the 12th district
- In office January 5, 2011 – November 28, 2014
- Preceded by: Kim Reynolds
- Succeeded by: Mark Costello

Personal details
- Born: Joni Kay Culver; July 1, 1970 (age 56) Red Oak, Iowa, U.S.
- Party: Republican
- Spouse: Gail Ernst (m. 1992; div. 2019)
- Children: 1
- Education: Iowa State University (BA); Columbus State University (MPA)
- Website: Senate website Campaign website

Military service
- Branch/service: United States Army; Army Reserve
- Years of service: 1992–1993 (reserve); 1993–2015 (guard)
- Rank: Lieutenant Colonel
- Unit: Iowa Army National Guard; 1168th Transportation Company; 185th Combat Sustainment Support Battalion
- Wars: Iraq War
- Awards: Meritorious Service Medal; Army Commendation Medal; Army Achievement Medal
- Ernst's voice Ernst on federal regulations Recorded March 7, 2023

Joni Kay Ernst (née Culver; born July 1, 1970) is an American politician and retired military officer serving since 2015 as the junior United States senator from Iowa. She is a member of the Republican Party.

After graduating from Iowa State University, Ernst joined the United States Army Reserve. She served in the Iowa Army National Guard from 1993 to 2015, retiring as a lieutenant colonel. During the Iraq War, she served as commanding officer of the 1168th Transportation Company in Kuwait and later commanded the 185th Combat Sustainment Support Battalion at Camp Dodge.

Ernst served in the Iowa State Senate from 2011 to 2014 and as auditor of Montgomery County from January 2005 to January 5, 2011. She was elected to the U.S. Senate in 2014 and reelected in 2020. As chair of the Senate Republican Policy Committee from 2023 to 2025, Ernst was the fourth-ranking Republican in the Senate. During her Senate tenure, she has called for reforms to Medicare, Medicaid, and Social Security. During the Trump administration, she expressed concern about Trump's trade war with China, and as a war hawk, criticized some of his foreign policy. While supporting both of Trump's nominees for EPA administrator, she expressed concern over their commitment to the Renewable Fuel Standard.

On September 2, 2025, Ernst announced that she would not seek reelection in 2026. She will be succeeded by Democrat Josh Turek.

== Early life and career ==
Ernst was born Joni Kay Culver in Montgomery County, Iowa, the daughter of Marilyn and Richard Culver. She was valedictorian of her class at Stanton Community School District High School. She earned a Bachelor of Arts degree in psychology from Iowa State University in 1992, and a Master of Public Administration degree from Columbus State University in 1995. In college, she took part in an agricultural exchange to the Soviet Union.

=== Military career ===
Ernst joined Iowa State University's Reserve Officers' Training Corps program when she was 20, and the United States Army Reserve after graduating. She served as a logistics officer and attained the rank of lieutenant colonel in the Iowa National Guard. In 2003–2004, she spent 12 months in Kuwait as commander of the 1168th Transportation Company, during the Iraq War. Near the end of her military career, she served as the commanding officer of the 185th Combat Sustainment Support Battalion at Camp Dodge, the Iowa Army National Guard's largest battalion. Upon her retirement from the military in 2015, Ernst had served 23 years in the Army Reserve and the Army National Guard. Her awards included the Meritorious Service Medal, Army Commendation Medal, Army Achievement Medal, Global War on Terrorism Expeditionary Medal, and Global War on Terrorism Service Medal.

In an interview with Time magazine in 2014, Ernst said she was sexually harassed in the military, saying, "I had comments, passes, things like that" that she was able to stop, and said she would support removing the chain of command from the investigation and prosecution of sexual assault cases.

=== Iowa politics ===
Ernst was elected Montgomery County Auditor in 2004, defeating the incumbent, Connie Magneson. She ran unopposed in 2008 and was reelected with 4,569 votes. She was elected to the Iowa State Senate in a special election in 2011 and reelected in 2012. She represented District 12, in southwestern Iowa.

Upon her election to the U.S. Senate, Ernst resigned from the Iowa State Senate, effective November 28, 2014.

== U.S. Senate ==
=== Elections ===
==== 2014 ====
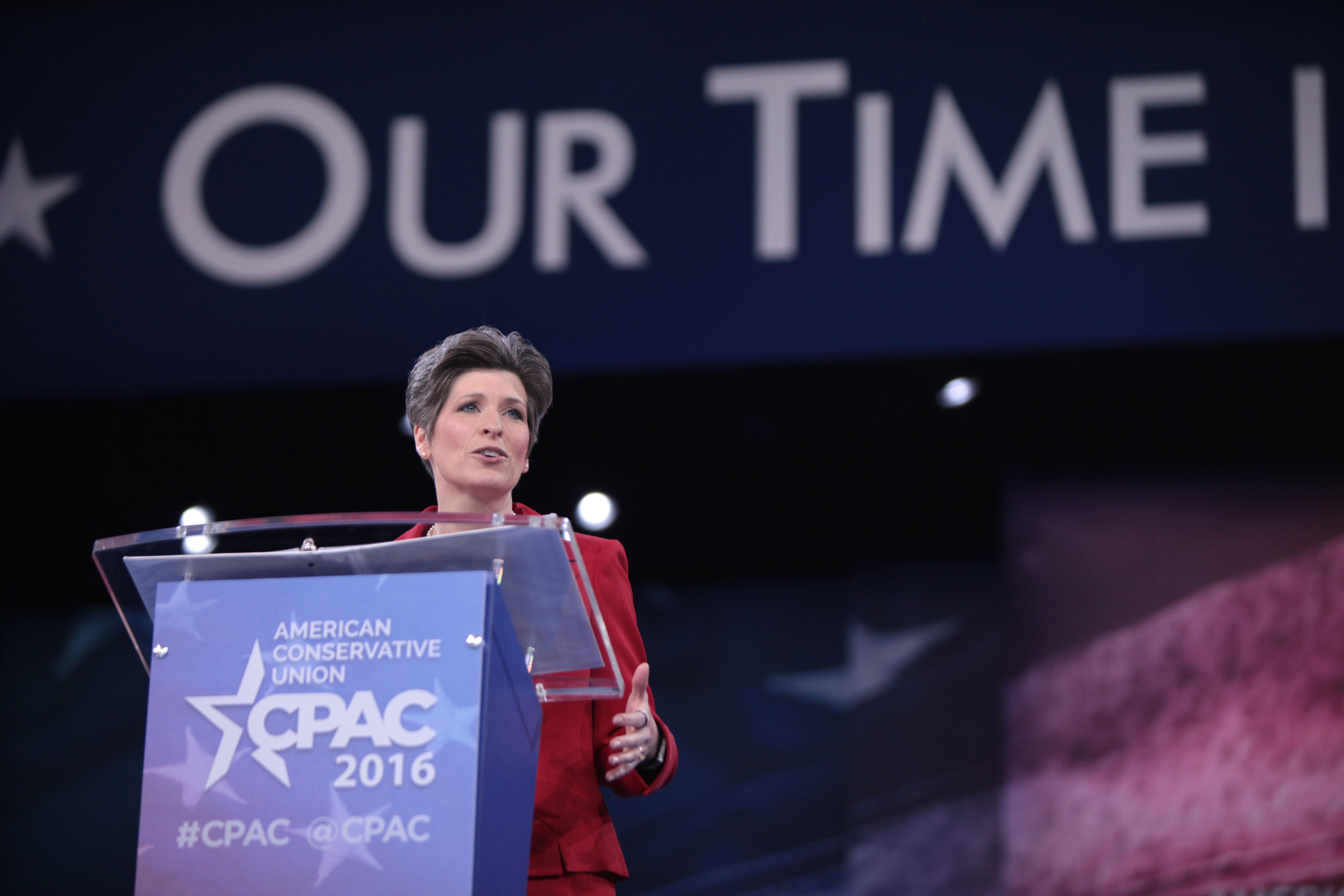
Ernst speaking at the Conservative Political Action Conference

In July 2013, Ernst announced that she would seek the Senate seat held by retiring Democratic Senator Tom Harkin. Iowa Lieutenant Governor Kim Reynolds endorsed her in October 2013. In March 2014, Ernst was endorsed by former Massachusetts Governor Mitt Romney and former Alaska Governor Sarah Palin, to whom she has drawn comparisons. In May 2014, the U.S. Chamber of Commerce, a lobbying group, endorsed her.

Little known at the start of her campaign, Ernst was boosted in the Republican primary by the Koch brothers with "hundreds of thousands of dollars' worth of television ads [...] and tens of thousands of dollars in direct campaign contributions". A Koch-backed group launched an "advertising blitz", including a $257,000 campaign against Ernst's biggest Republican rival, oil executive Mark Jacobs, who had supported a proposal to limit carbon emissions that Koch Industries opposed. Ernst privately credited the Kochs and their allies for having "really started my trajectory" after her primary victory.

Ernst received widespread attention for a campaign advertisement she released in March 2014, in which she made a tongue-in-cheek comparison between her experience castrating pigs and her ability to "cut pork" in Congress. Many found the ad humorous, and it was spoofed by late-night comedians, such as Jimmy Fallon and Stephen Colbert. Before the ad aired, Ernst had struggled to raise money, and two polls of the Republican primary taken in February 2014 had shown her in second place, several points behind Mark Jacobs. After it aired, a Suffolk University poll in early April showed her with a narrow lead and a Loras College poll showed her essentially tied with Jacobs. By May, she was being described in the media as the "strong front-runner".

During the primary, Ernst promoted a conspiracy theory that a United Nations sustainable development plan, Agenda 21, could lead to farmers being forced off their land and made to live in cities, but a few months later she said she did not consider the plan a "threat".

In a May 2014 Des Moines Register interview, Ernst said she was "extremely offended" by comments Jacobs made characterizing her as AWOL due to missing over 100 votes in the legislative session. Previously, in The Gazette, Ernst cited her National Guard duty to rebuff criticism about her missing votes, but The Gazette found that only 12 of the 117 missed votes came on days when she was on duty. The other 105 missed votes represented 57% of the Iowa Senate votes that session. Ernst's spokesman said she had a better than 90% voting record during her Senate career and that she had never claimed Guard service was the only reason she had missed votes.

In July, Ernst delivered the Republican Party's weekly address, criticizing a health care scandal at the Department of Veterans Affairs and calling for a balanced budget and reform of Social Security and Medicare. Later that month, she suspended her campaign while participating in two weeks of National Guard duty.

In endorsing her for the Republican primary nomination, the Des Moines Register wrote: "Ernst is a smart, well-prepared candidate who can wrestle with the details of public policy from a conservative perspective without seeming inflexible." On October 23, Ernst canceled a scheduled meeting with the Des Moines Register's editorial board, citing the paper's negative editorials about her. The editorial board ultimately endorsed Braley, citing Ernst's calls to abolish the EPA, the Department of Education, and the federal minimum wage, as well as her support for partially privatizing Social Security and overturning the Affordable Care Act.

In the 2014 election, Ernst received $17,552,085 in "dark money", which constituted 74% of non-party outside spending in her support; she had a $14 million outside spending advantage over her opponent. In an October 2014 debate, Ernst said she “believe[s] in political free speech” and did not see a need to change campaign finance laws.

Ernst won the election by 94,205 votes. She is the first woman elected to represent Iowa in either house of Congress. She is also the first female combat veteran to serve in the Senate.

==== 2020 ====
Ernst ran for reelection in 2020. She was unopposed in the Republican primary and faced Democratic nominee Theresa Greenfield, a businesswoman and former congressional candidate, in the general election. Ernst was seen as the strong favorite and eventually defeated her opponent, by 110,138 votes.

In December 2019, the Associated Press reported that Ernst's campaign had closely coordinated with a political nonprofit founded by a longtime consultant; such groups are tax-exempt and not required to disclose donors, but cannot make political campaigning their primary purpose and must separate their activities from candidates they support. An Ernst campaign adviser said that any implication they had acted outside the "spirit of the law" was "fake news". After the article's publication, the nonpartisan Campaign Legal Center filed a complaint with the Federal Election Commission.

==== 2026 ====
On September 2, 2025, Ernst announced that she would not seek reelection in 2026.

=== Tenure ===
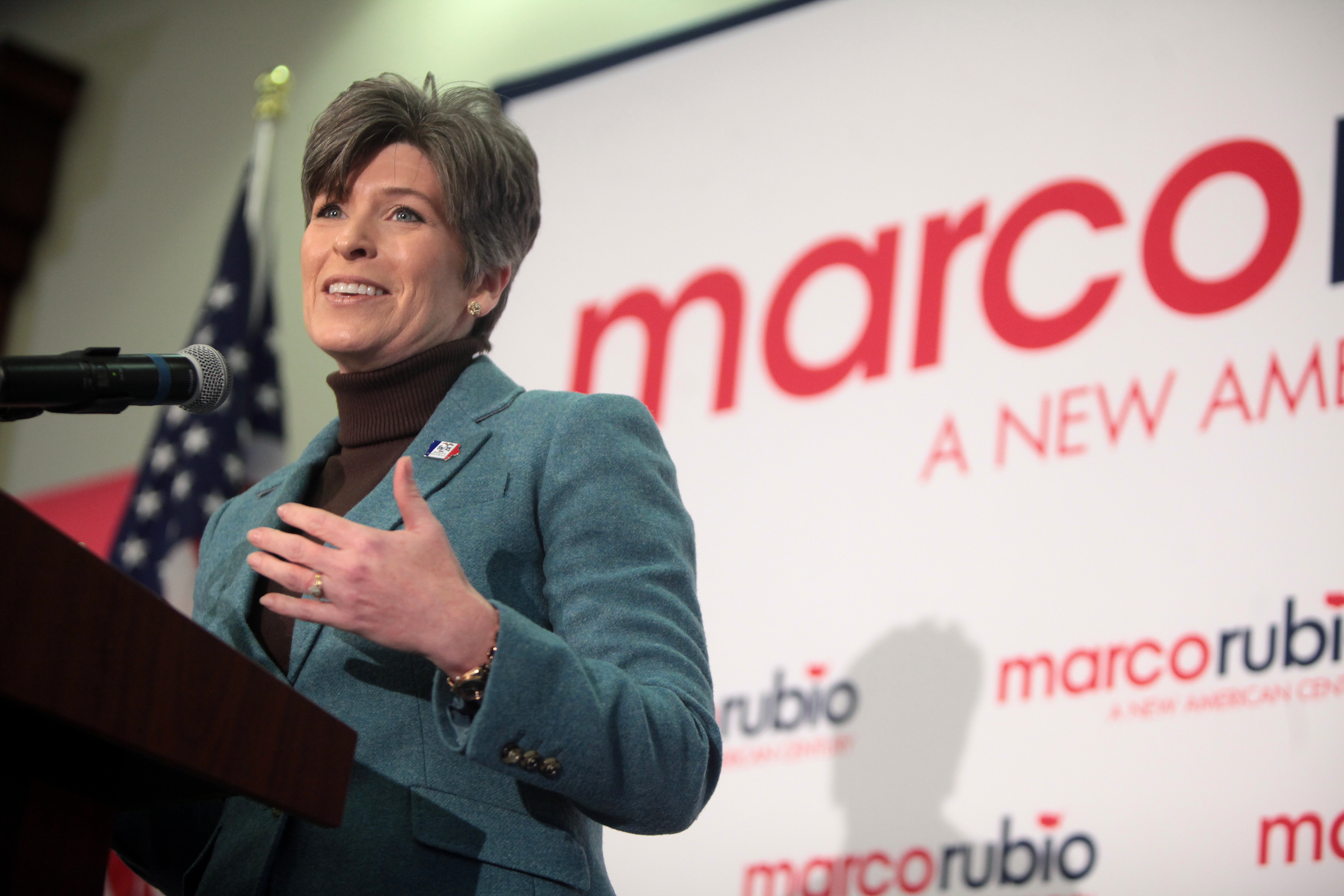
Ernst speaking at a campaign event for Marco Rubio in January 2016

Ernst was sworn into the United States Senate on January 3, 2015, and thus became Iowa's first new U.S. senator since Tom Harkin in 1985. She delivered the official Republican response to the State of the Union on January 20.

In May 2016, Chris Cillizza put Ernst on his short list of possible vice presidential running mates for Donald Trump to become the 45th President of the United States. Other media outlets also mentioned her as a possible benefit to Trump's campaign. On June 16, Ernst said no one had "reached out" to her about a vice-presidential nomination. On July 4, she and Trump met privately. Trump selected Governor Mike Pence of Indiana on July 15.

In 2016, Ernst and other Republican senators introduced "Sarah's Law" in honor of Sarah Root, a 21-year-old student in Omaha who was killed in a street racing crash earlier that year.

In 2017, Ernst asked Secretary of Defense nominee James Mattis whether he would pledge to cut wasteful spending and stop sexual assault in the military, to which Mattis agreed.

In March, after photographs of nude female soldiers were posted on Facebook, Ernst said that this "type of activity creates a culture that leads to sexual assault." At a press conference two weeks later, she asked Congress to pass a law requiring people to immediately report suspected sexual assault at government facilities.

Ernst was elected vice chair of the Senate Republican Conference in November 2018.

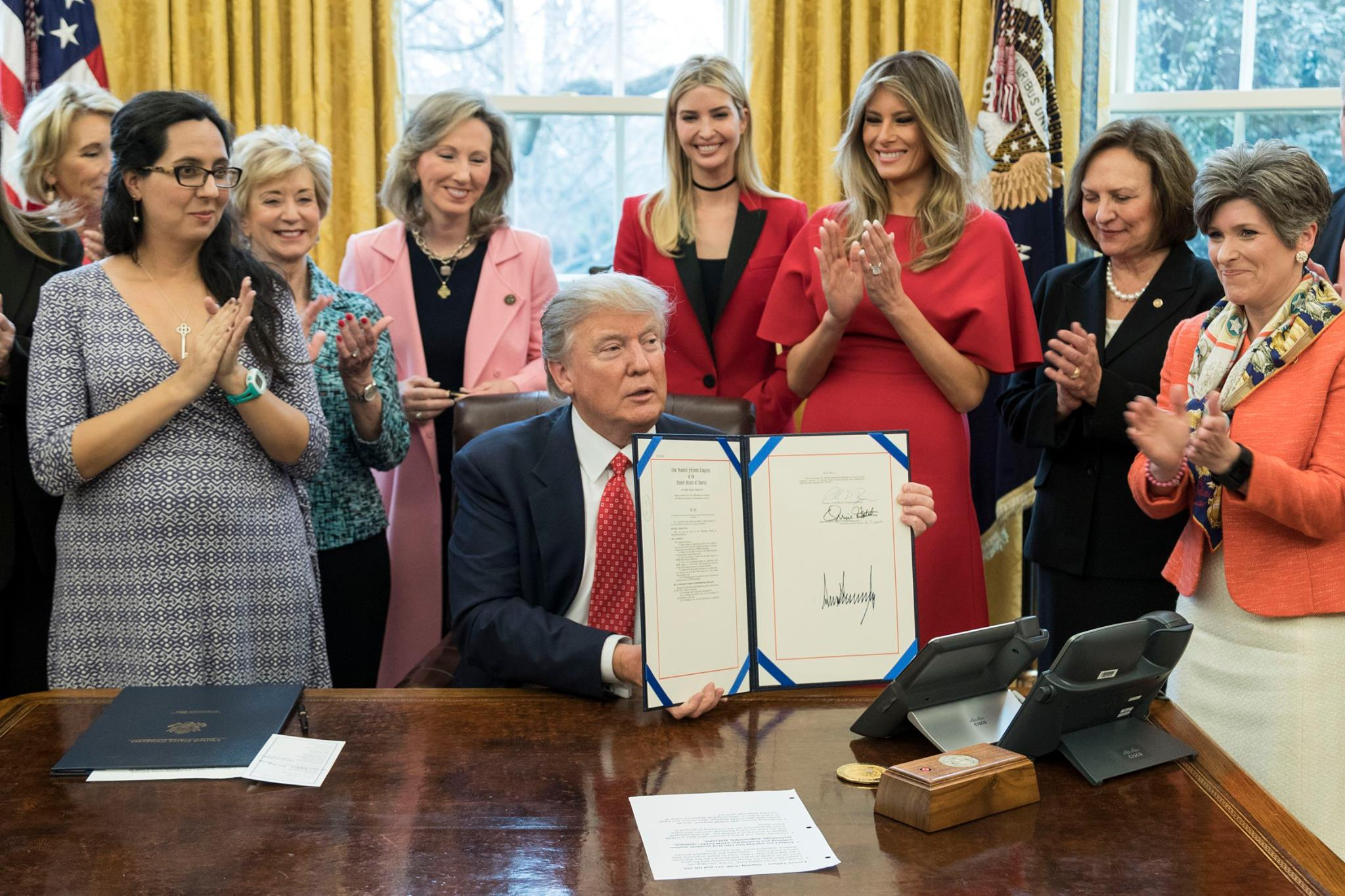
Ernst (far right) at the signing of the INSPIRE Women Act at the White House, 2017

On the initiation of the 116th United States Congress in 2019, Ernst became the first female Republican to be appointed to the Senate Judiciary Committee, along with Marsha Blackburn.

In March 2019, after the Special Counsel Investigation concluded and Attorney General William Barr released an abridged summary of Special Counsel Robert Mueller's report, Ernst called for a release of the report's full findings, saying, "as much of the report that can be made public should be".

In August 2020, when Iowa had the most new COVID-19 infections per capita of any state in the preceding seven days, Ernst repeated a debunked conspiracy theory that the case numbers were greatly inflated and that health care providers might be falsifying them. She later walked back her statements.

After Justice Ruth Bader Ginsburg's death in September 2020, Ernst said she supported Trump nominating a new justice before the November presidential election. Eight months before the 2016 presidential election, Ernst opposed Senate consideration of Barack Obama's Supreme Court nominee Merrick Garland, saying "the American people deserve to have a say" on a decision that would "impact the course of our country for years to come". In 2018, Ernst reiterated that Supreme Court nominees should not be heard during presidential election years, telling the Des Moines Register, "It's precedent set. ... So come 2020, if there's an opening, I'm sure you'll remind me of that."

Ernst was participating in the certification of the 2021 United States Electoral College vote count when Trump supporters stormed the U.S. Capitol. She called the storming "a protest turned anarchy" and, citing that she served in the military to defend the right to peacefully protest, "a complete betrayal of those sacred ideals." When Congress returned to the certification process, Ernst voted to support certification. She opposed impeaching Trump for the attack on the Capitol, choosing to support a peaceful transfer of power and "healing our nation." In response, The Gazette editorial board wrote that Ernst and Grassley "must reckon with why they did the wrong thing for so long" regarding their support of Trump during his presidency.

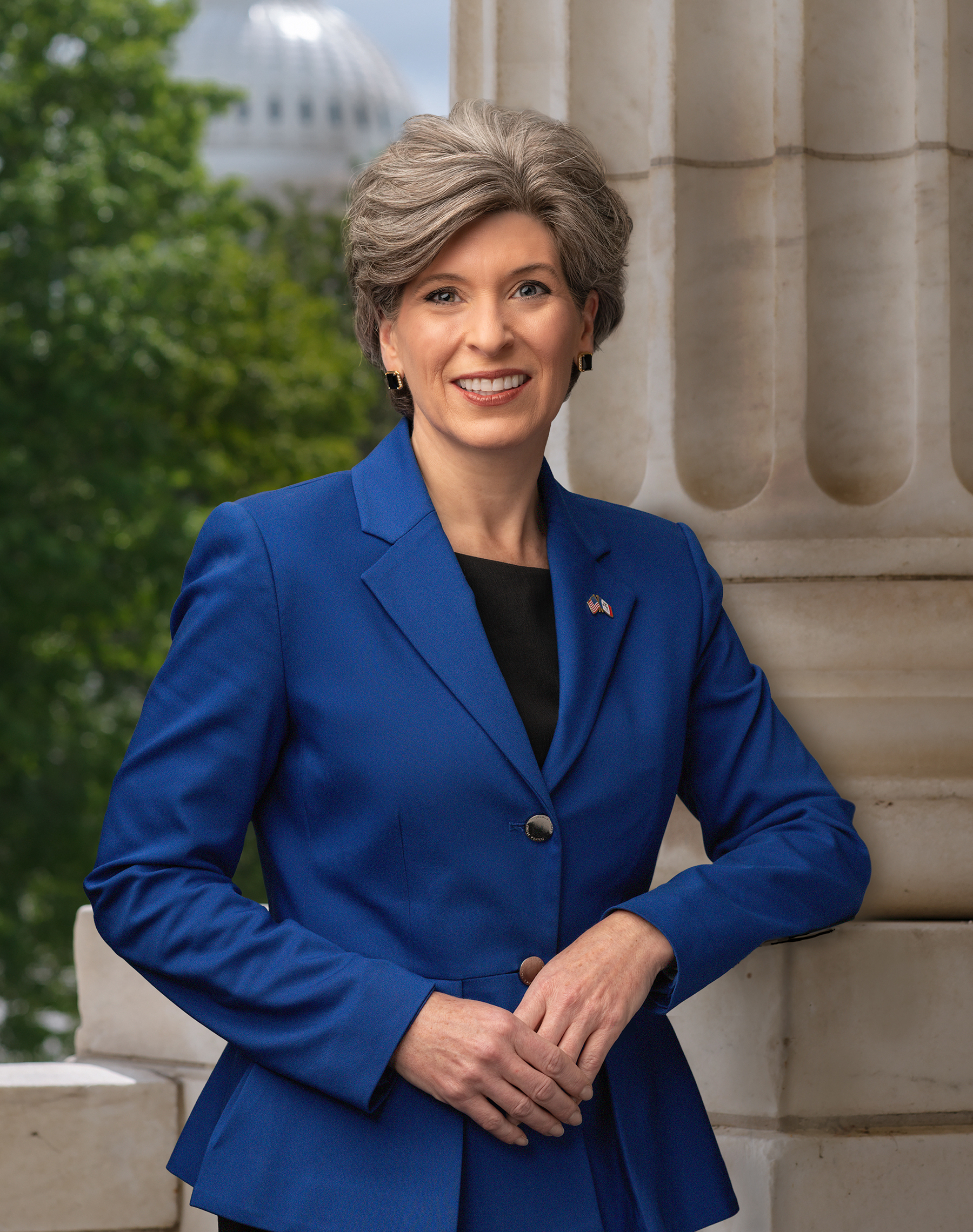
Ernst during the 116th Congress

In a September 2021 Fox News interview, Ernst accused President Joe Biden of overstepping presidential powers and "leading by coercion" with the newly announced "Path Out of the Pandemic" initiative, aimed at mitigating the rising threat of the COVID-19 Delta variant. "Forcing these federal mandates was one way to divert us", she said. "This is a diversion away from 9/11, away from the 20th anniversary and away from the debacle that was his Afghanistan withdrawal". The previous week, Biden had signed an executive order declassifying 9/11 documents that the victims' families had requested for many years; his agenda on September 11, 2021, included visits to three 9/11 crash sites in New York, Pennsylvania, and Virginia.

In March 2024, Ernst announced that she would run for Senate Republican Conference chair in 2025, a position that Senator Tom Cotton was also seeking. Cotton was elected conference chair.

=== Committee assignments ===
- Committee on Armed Services
  - Subcommittee on Airland
  - Subcommittee on Cybersecurity
  - Subcommittee on Emerging Threats and Capabilities (Chair)
- Committee on Agriculture, Nutrition and Forestry
  - Subcommittee on Commodities, Risk Management, and Trade
  - Subcommittee on Food and Nutrition, Specialty Crops, Organics, and Research
  - Subcommittee on Rural Development and Energy
- Committee on Small Business and Entrepreneurship (Chair)

=== Caucus memberships ===
- Congressional Motorcycle Caucus
- Republican Main Street Partnership
- Senate Taiwan Caucus

== Political positions ==
In 2019, Politico called Ernst "a reliable vote for most of Trump's agenda", and as of October 2020, she had voted in line with Donald Trump's positions 91.1% of the time.

=== Abortion ===
Ernst opposes legalized abortion. In 2013, she voted for a fetal personhood amendment in the Iowa Senate and has said that she would support a federal personhood bill. Critics, such as the American College of Obstetricians and Gynecologists, have expressed concern that such an amendment could restrict abortion even in cases of rape or incest, as well as certain forms of birth control, although Ernst has said she supports access to birth control. In January 2020, she petitioned the U.S. Supreme Court to reconsider Roe v. Wade, the landmark ruling that found abortion bans are unconstitutional.

In 2017, Ernst introduced legislation allowing states to block Planned Parenthood from receiving Title X grants or reimbursements for treating Medicaid patients, although Planned Parenthood clinics provide multiple family planning services and the funding does not go to abortions except in rare circumstances. Ernst supported the 2022 Supreme Court decision Dobbs v. Jackson Women's Health Organization that overturned Roe v. Wade, calling it a science-based decision.

=== Agriculture ===
In 2025, Ernst introduced the Food Security and Farm Protection Act, an updated version of the King Amendment and Ending Agricultural Trade Suppression (EATS) Act that seeks to prohibit state and local governments from imposing production standards on agricultural goods sold in interstate commerce. The bill was introduced in response to California's Proposition 12, which established minimum space requirements for livestock producers selling pork, veal, and egg products in California. Ernst argued that such regulations impose unfair burdens on out-of-state producers. Opponents warned the legislation would undermine efforts to regulate food safety, animal welfare, and public health. The proposal is expected to be a significant issue in the 2025 farm bill negotiations.

=== Barack Obama ===
In 2014, when asked about President Barack Obama's recess appointments, Ernst called Obama a "dictator" who should be "removed from office" or face "impeachment". She said, "He is running amok. He is not following our Constitution." Later in 2014, Ernst criticized Obama's handling of the Ebola outbreak.

=== Donald Trump ===
During the first Donald Trump administration, Ernst expressed concern about Trump's trade war with China, and as a war hawk, criticized some of his foreign policy.

In February 2020, Ernst voted to acquit Trump on both articles of impeachment (abuse of power and obstruction of Congress). She argued that Trump had learned his lesson, and that he would not ask a foreign leader to investigate his rivals again without going through the proper channels. At the same time, she suggested that Joe Biden could be impeached if he becomes president over his actions in Ukraine.

In May 2020, Ernst praised Trump's response to the COVID-19 pandemic, saying, "he was right on it from day one". On May 28, 2021, she voted against creating an independent commission to investigate the 2021 United States Capitol attack.

After Trump took office as president for the second time in January 2025, the Department of Government Efficiency (DOGE) sought access to the sensitive systems of several U.S. government bodies, prompting multiple legal challenges. In February 2025, Ernst expressed her support for DOGE's actions, saying, "There’s a lot of disruption, but I would argue that that disruption was needed to be able to go in and scrutinize the record, scrutinize expenditures to fully understand what’s going on."

=== Economic policy ===
Ernst opposes a federal minimum wage and has said that states should have sole authority to set their minimum wages. She voted against a minimum wage increase in the state Senate. In response to a Congressional Budget Office report projecting that increasing the minimum wage to $10.10 per hour would lift 900,000 people out of poverty but cost 500,000 people their jobs, Ernst said, "government-mandated wage increases are not the solution."

Ernst has proposed eliminating the Internal Revenue Service. In the state Senate, she worked on legislation that reduced property taxes. In 2014, she said she supports a "fairer, flatter, and simpler" federal tax code, a reduction in discretionary spending and spending on social programs, and a constitutional amendment requiring a balanced federal budget. In 2017, she voted for the Tax Cuts and Jobs Act.

Ernst has expressed support for the partial privatization of Social Security accounts for young workers while making clear that "we have to keep our promises to seniors".

In May 2018, Ernst was one of nine Republican senators to introduce a rescission package meant to fulfill Trump's wish to curb previously approved spending by $15.4 billion as part of an attempt to roll out the legislation to ensure it reached the Senate floor within a 45-day window.

=== Education ===
Ernst supports eliminating the U.S. Department of Education, saying she "believe[s] our children are better educated when it's coming from the state." While states handle almost all education policy decisions, the Department of Education conducts nationwide research, monitors for discrimination, and distributes student financial aid through loans and grants. In 2014, Ernst claimed, inaccurately, that 94% of employees at the Department of Education had been deemed “nonessential” and argued funding would be better spent at the state and local level. PolitiFact calculated that hypothetically reassigning all employees to non-federal positions would increase state and local education staffing by “4/100ths of 1 percent”. In February 2017, Ernst voted to confirm Betsy DeVos as Education Secretary, saying they shared a belief that those "closest" to students know what is best for them.

=== Environment ===
Ernst rejects the scientific consensus on climate change and has said that any governmental regulation to address it should be "very small." In a 2014 debate, she said, "I don't know the science behind climate change. I can't say one way or another what is the direct impact from whether it's manmade or not." In 2018, after the release of the Fourth National Climate Assessment, detailing the impact of climate change, Ernst said that "our climate always changes and we see those ebb and flows through time".

In her 2014 Senate campaign, Ernst won support from the Koch brothers and affiliated groups, who helped propel her ahead of a primary opponent who backed a proposal to limit carbon emissions. In 2014, she said she is "adamantly opposed" to cap-and-trade, a market-based approach to reducing carbon emissions. She supported Trump's 2017 decision to withdraw from the Paris climate accords.

Ernst has called for eliminating the Environmental Protection Agency. In 2014, she criticized the impact of the Clean Water Act on farms and businesses and said she would have voted against the 2014 U.S. Farm Bill.

After voting to confirm Trump nominee Scott Pruitt as Administrator of the Environmental Protection Agency, Ernst said in 2018 that he had lied to her about upholding the Renewable Fuel Standard, which mandates a minimum proportion of ethanol that must be mixed with fuel, while calling Pruitt "about as swampy as you get". In February 2019, Ernst voted to confirm Trump's new nominee for EPA administrator, Andrew Wheeler. In June 2019, she said she had asked Trump and Wheeler to limit the issuing of RFS waivers, saying they were being handed out "like candy" without congressional oversight.

=== Foreign policy ===
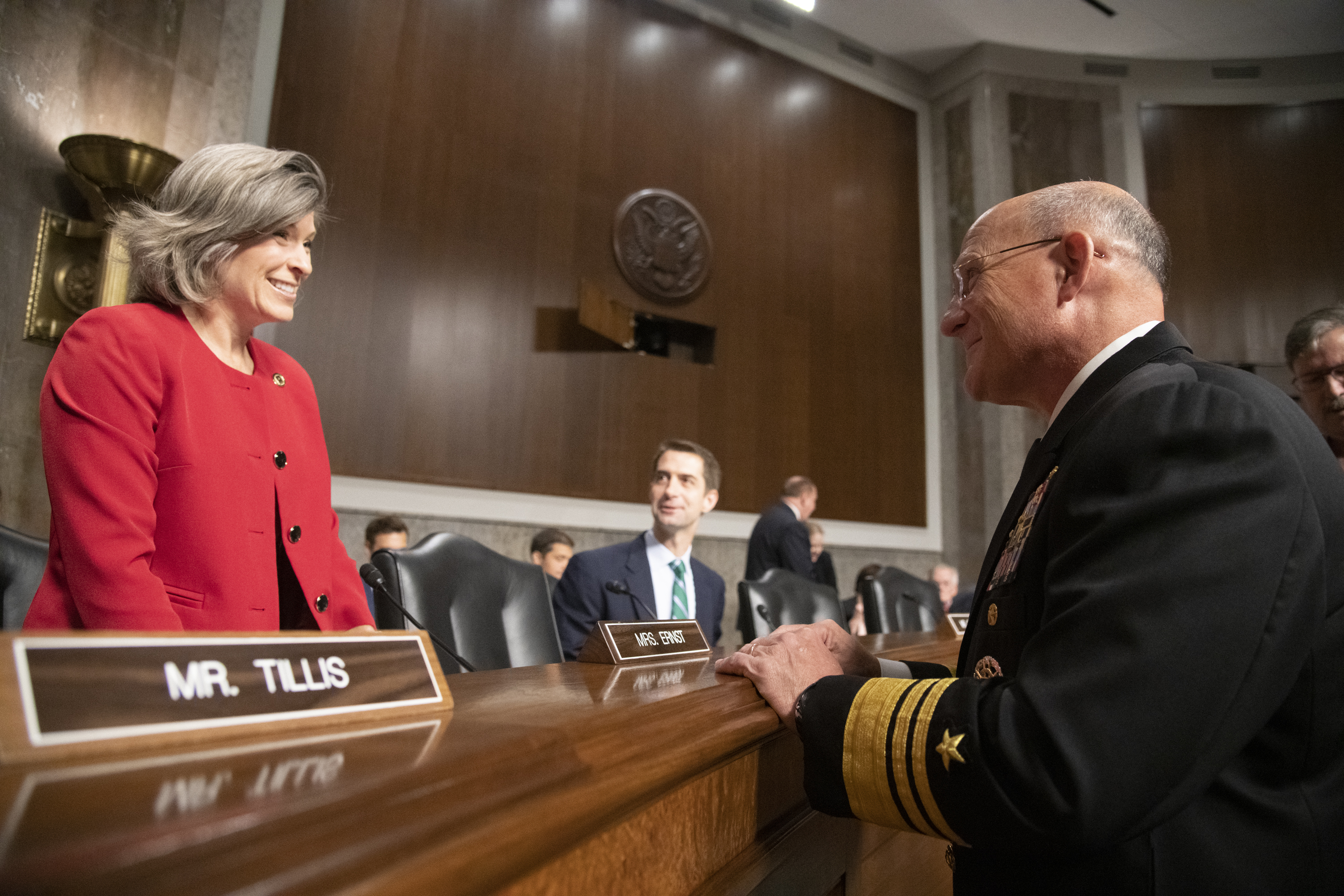
Ernst speaking to Navy Vice Admiral Michael M. Gilday during an Armed Services Committee hearing in 2019

==== Afghanistan ====
In October 2015, Ernst said that Obama lacked "a clear coherent strategy in Afghanistan" amid the rise of Taliban forces and ISIS. In August 2021, she called the U.S. troop withdrawal from Afghanistan "rapid and haphazard" and "shameful", chiding the Biden administration for removing troops before guaranteeing the safety of the U.S. embassy.

==== Iran ====
Ernst opposed the Iran deal negotiated by the Obama administration. In January 2020, she expressed support for the US military's assassination of Iranian major general Qasem Soleimani by drone strike at Baghdad International Airport.

In March 2026, shortly after the start of the Iran war, Ernst said: "I truly do believe that what we are engaging in in this operation will bring us greater safety in the long run. It hurts today. It hurts significantly today. But what we are trying to do is pave a way for peace in the future." She added that congressional Democrats' attempts to rein in the president's war powers were emboldening Iran, and that the US could "bring Iran to its knees." After the 2026 midterm elections, in which Democrats retook the House and Senate, Ernst said, "We saw Iowans absolutely reject the war in Iran and the cost that it's causing on American families and their pocketbooks."

==== Iraq ====
Of the Iraq War and weapons of mass destruction, she said, "We don't know that there were weapons on the ground when we went in. However, I do have reason to believe there were weapons of mass destruction in Iraq. That was the intelligence that was operated on. I have reason to believe there was weapons of mass destruction. My husband served in Saudi Arabia as an Army Central Command sergeant major for a year and that's a hot-button topic in that area." After criticism from Iowa Democrats and some commentators, Ernst then issued a statement that she had not meant to suggest that Iraq had WMD at the time of invasion, but rather that Iraq had used WMDs in the past, and that her point was that "we don't know exactly what happened to those weapons."

When asked whether she supports the limited airstrikes conducted in Iraq in August 2014, Ernst said, "What I can say is what I would have supported is leaving additional troops in Iraq longer and perhaps we wouldn't have this situation today."

==== Israel ====
In October 2023, days after the beginning of the Gaza war, Ernst led a congressional delegation to meetings with Prime Minister of Israel Benjamin Netanyahu, other Israeli leaders, and American civilians in Israel. She said the meetings were meant to "reassure the leadership in Israel as well as a number of American families that were there that we stand shoulder to shoulder with Israel".

In July 2024, before Netanyahu gave a speech to Congress, Ernst led a Republican press conference "demanding action from this waffling White House" and called for U.S. sanctions and weapons to help Israel defeat Hamas. She also criticized Vice President Kamala Harris for not attending the speech, calling her absence "a disgrace" and asking what duties Harris would neglect if elected president.

Ernst met with Netanyahu at his Jerusalem office in August 2025 and again in January 2026.

==== Korean conflict ====
In June 2018, Ernst questioned Trump's decision to suspend joint military exercises with South Korea. In July, she advocated that the United States continue the exercises in case talks between the US and North Korea did not continue.

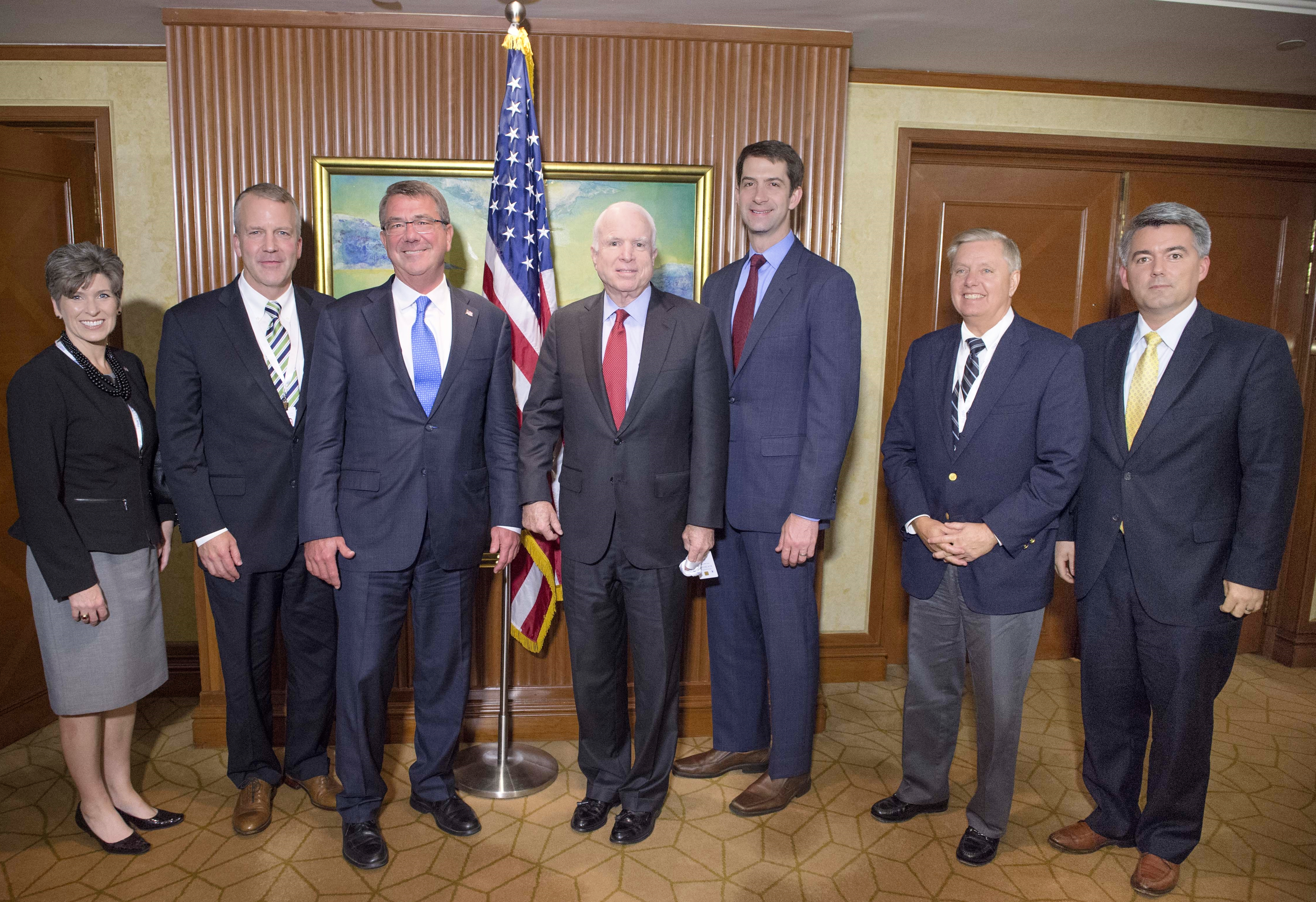
Ernst with Republican Senators and Defense Secretary Ash Carter at the 2016 International Institute for Strategic Studies Asia Security Summit in Singapore

==== Russia ====
In 2017, Ernst called Russia's behavior, including its annexation of Crimea and interference in U.S. elections, "totally unacceptable" and said Trump should "show strength against Vladimir Putin". The next year, she urged caution if the U.S. worked with Russia to "put a lid on Iran", saying that Russia would never be "a true friend or ally" to the U.S. She cited North Korea as another case where caution should be maintained when cooperating to make the world "a safer place". After the 2018 Russia-United States summit later that month, Ernst expressed hope that Trump had "delivered a strong message" that Russia would be punished for its annexation of Ukraine, support of Bashar al-Assad, and "aggressive actions in U.S. domestic policy", and that Trump had discussed Russia's actions in the Balkans.

In February 2024, Ernst and Grassley broke with most Senate Republicans to vote for a $95 billion foreign aid bill that included $60 billion to support Ukraine. Ernst said that Congress was "equipping America to push back against our adversaries' aggression" and that the bill was "critical to reversing President Biden's weakness on the world stage that has abandoned our partners, emboldened authoritarians, and put American lives at risk."

==== Syrian civil war ====
In 2015, Ernst said the U.S. should halt the admission of Syrian refugees, saying the United States needs a "thorough vetting process".

In 2018, after missile strikes against Syria, Ernst said that she would be "uncomfortable" if Trump wanted to commit more American troops there, saying it was secondary to fighting ISIS. After Trump announced the withdrawal of troops from Syria, Ernst was one of six senators to sign a letter expressing concern, calling the move a "premature and costly mistake" that would "embolden ISIS, Bashar al Assad, Iran, and Russia."

In 2019, Ernst was one of six senators to sign a bipartisan letter to Trump calling on him to "urge Turkey to end their offensive and find a way to a peaceful resolution while supporting our Kurdish partners to ensure regional stability" and arguing that leaving Syria without installing protections for American allies endangered both them and the US.

==== Yemen ====
In March 2018, Ernst voted to table a resolution spearheaded by Bernie Sanders, Chris Murphy, and Mike Lee that would have required Trump to withdraw American troops either in or influencing Yemen within the next 30 days unless they were combating Al-Qaeda.

In November 2018, following the murder of Saudi journalist Jamal Khashoggi, Ernst said that Saudi Arabia was a "great strategic partner" but that Congress should consider a legislative response due to the United States' commitment to human rights and the rule of law. She added that Trump should become involved "if there are indicators coming from those intelligence agencies". In December, Ernst warned that a resolution withdrawing U.S. support for the Saudi Arabia-led intervention in Yemen could complicate peace talks in Yemen and that, although Saudi Arabia should be punished for Khashoggi's death, "those consequences are I see as right now are separate from the discussion of the Saudis and their actions in Yemen engaging the Houthis".

=== Gun policy ===
Ernst supports open carry legislation, which allows guns to be carried openly in public. In 2019, she was one of 31 Republican cosponsors of a bill to grant those with concealed carry privileges in their home state the right to carry concealed weapons in other states with concealed carry laws.

In a 2014 debate, speaking about the Santa Barbara shooting, Ernst said, "Just because of a horrible, horrible tragedy, I don't believe we should be infringing upon people's Second Amendment rights." After the 2018 Stoneman Douglas High School shooting, she said that mental illness was the "root cause" of many mass shootings. She later cosponsored a bill to require federal authorities to inform states within a day if a person failing a background check attempted to buy a firearm.

In 2017, amid bipartisan momentum for bump stock restrictions, Ernst was one of 10 Republican senators to sign a letter requesting that the Bureau of Alcohol, Tobacco, Firearms and Explosives review a decision that bump stocks fall outside the purview of existing gun regulations.

According to data from OpenSecrets, the NRA spent $3,124,273 in support of Ernst between 2014 and 2018, mostly attacking candidates running against her.

=== Health care ===
Ernst opposes the Affordable Care Act. The Campaign for Liberty reported that in 2012 Ernst had answered "Yes" to a survey question asking whether she would support legislation that would "nullify ObamaCare and authorize state and local law enforcement to arrest federal officials attempting to implement [it]." She voted for all three versions of a bill to repeal the ACA in 2017. In 2018, Ernst was one of 10 Republican senators to cosponsor a bill intended to guarantee coverage for people with preexisting conditions, though it would have allowed insurers to exclude coverage for the conditions themselves.

Ernst has expressed support for reforming Medicare and Medicaid and endorsed a partial privatization of both programs in a 2011 Iowa Senate vote. A CBO report found that the plan would increase medical costs for Medicare beneficiaries 61% by 2022, compared with 27% under the existing structure. In 2013, she said there was a "generation of people that rely on the government to provide absolutely everything for them" and that removing them from government programs such as the Affordable Care Act "is going to be very painful".

Ernst has questioned the legitimacy of how hospitals are reporting COVID-19 deaths.

In August 2022, Ernst voted against capping the price of insulin at $35. She has said that she has two diabetic family members.

On May 30, 2025, in response to a constituent at a town hall meeting who told her people would die as a result of Medicaid and SNAP cuts in the 2025 budget reconciliation bill, Ernst said: "Well, we are all going to die. For heaven's sakes, folks". In response to subsequent backlash, she posted an Instagram apology video wherein she walked around a graveyard and said, "I made an incorrect assumption that everyone in the auditorium understood that yes, we are all going to perish from this Earth. So I apologize. And I'm really, really glad that I did not have to bring up the subject of the tooth fairy as well". She added, "For those that would like to see eternal and everlasting life, I encourage you to embrace my lord and savior, Jesus Christ". Senate Minority Leader Chuck Schumer mockingly called the One Big Beautiful Bill Act the "We're All Going to Die Act", alluding to these comments.

=== Immigration ===
In June 2018, Ernst and Democratic senators Kirsten Gillibrand and Patrick Leahy wrote Defense Secretary James Mattis a letter saying they were "deeply troubled" by the decision to send 21 Judge Advocate General's Corps to prosecute immigration cases on the southern border, calling it an "inappropriate misapplication of military personnel" and urging Mattis to retain the military lawyers within the military justice system.

In July 2018, Ernst was one of 31 Republican senators to submit a resolution endorsing Immigration and Customs Enforcement (ICE), saying its abolition would allow "dangerous criminal aliens" and members of the MS-13 gang to remain in the U.S.

Amid the 2018–19 United States federal government shutdown that resulted after Trump demanded $5.7 billion for a border wall, Ernst said she would "tend to agree that not all areas of our border need a physical barrier" if they are monitored by technology or Border Patrol agents and it was possible to respond in a "timely manner".

=== Internet ===
Ernst opposes net neutrality, which prevents internet service providers from blocking or slowing down certain content, and voted against reinstating it after an FCC ruling in 2018.

In May 2020, Ernst voted for an amendment co-sponsored by Senators Steve Daines and Ron Wyden that would have required federal intelligence and law enforcement agencies to obtain federal court warrants when collecting web search engine data from American citizens, nationals, or residents under the Foreign Intelligence Surveillance Act (FISA).

=== LGBTQ rights ===
In a 2014 debate, Ernst said she believes that same-sex marriage is a state's rights issue, but that she would support a federal ban were one proposed. In the Iowa Senate, she co-sponsored a bill to amend the state constitution to define marriage as between one man and one woman.

In 2017, she announced her opposition to Trump's ban on transgender people serving in the armed forces. At the same time, she announced her opposition to government funding of gender-reassignment surgeries.

Ernst was one of 12 Republican senators to vote for the Respect for Marriage Act, which passed the Senate on November 29, 2022.

=== Nullification ===
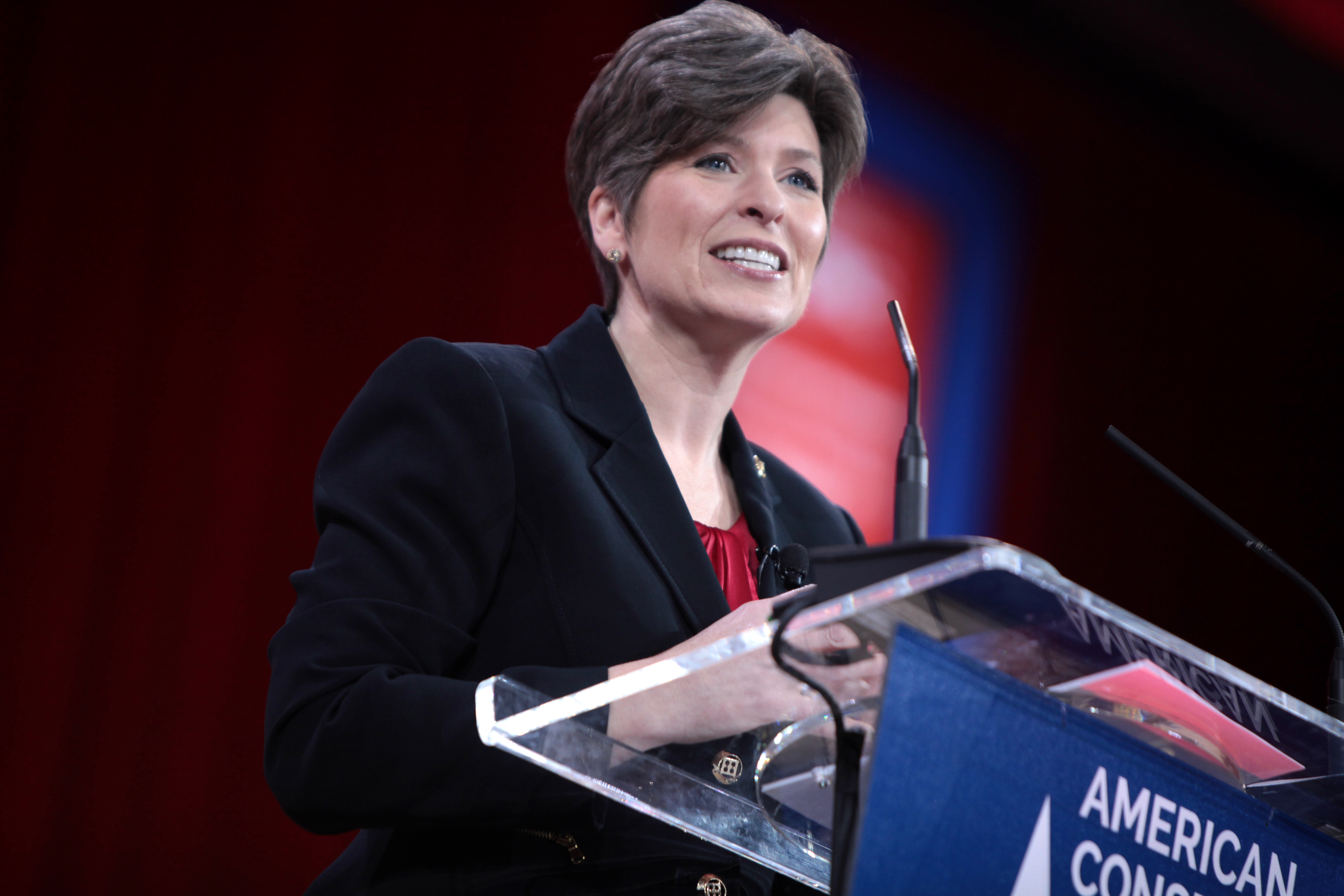
Ernst speaking at the 2015 Conservative Political Action Conference

As a state senator, Ernst co-sponsored a resolution urging the "nullification" of EPA rules on emissions standards and another expressing the Iowa General Assembly's "refusal to recognize" federal laws "which conflict with the Second Amendment". In 2012, she answered "Yes" to a survey asking whether she would support legislation "nullify[ing] Obamacare and authoriz[ing] state and local law enforcement to arrest federal officials attempting to implement [it]."

In 2013, Ernst said Congress should not pass laws "that the states would consider nullifying", referring to what she called "200-plus years of federal legislators going against the Tenth Amendment's states' rights." Courts have consistently ruled that nullification is unconstitutional. During her 2014 Senate campaign, Ernst's spokespeople argued that she did not support nullification, and that "her comments on it were about encouraging Iowans to send her to Washington to pass good laws."

=== Relationship with Steve King ===
Ernst's relationship with Steve King, a Republican House Representative known for his racist rhetoric and support for far-right politicians, has been criticized. In 2016, when King faced a primary challenge for his House seat, Ernst endorsed him, saying he "stands strong for life and liberty." In 2017, when King attracted criticism for saying "we can't restore our civilization with somebody else's babies" and for supporting European far-right politicians, Ernst said she did not condone King's behavior but would not ask for his resignation. In 2017, The Des Moines Register wrote a scathing editorial against King, which criticized Ernst for endorsing him in the past and not condemning him. In 2018, Ernst appeared with King at a rally in his district after King had endorsed a Canadian politician with neo-Nazi ties.

In 2019, amid extensive criticism of King by Republican politicians after King made controversial remarks about white supremacy, Ernst rebuked him. The New York Times wrote that Ernst's belated distancing from King might harm her 2020 reelection effort, as she previously "had spent years embracing Mr. King." Art Cullen, editor of The Storm Lake Times, criticized the timing of Ernst's response, which came after it started to look possible that King would lose his seat, writing "the hypocrisy is epic and comic." The Des Moines Register's editorial board questioned why it took national condemnation for Ernst to rebuke King. Ernst did not make an endorsement in King's 2020 Republican primary race, which he lost.

=== Trade ===
In 2018, as Trump imposed tariffs as part of his trade policy and other countries responded in kind, Ernst said she was willing to give him some leeway but worried about the impact on farmers. In May 2019, amid a trade war between the United States and China, Ernst said she did not like tariffs but that the "president's way of negotiating ... brings people to the table." She said that Iowa farmers are "disappointed" but that they recognize "that China is the one that is forcing this."

In January 2018, Ernst was one of 36 Republican senators to sign a letter to Trump requesting he preserve and modernize the North American Free Trade Agreement. In August 2018, she warned that failure to finish trade deals would "reflect negatively upon our Republican candidates" and advocated completing NAFTA and continuing to work with the European Union. In 2019, Ernst accused House Speaker Nancy Pelosi of "slow-walking" the passage of the USMCA trade agreement but believed there was enough support to ratify it.

== Personal life ==
In 1992, Ernst (then Joni Culver) married Gail Ernst. The Ernsts have one child. On August 27, 2018, Ernst announced that she and her husband were in the process of obtaining a divorce. In a sworn affidavit, Ernst said she had declined Trump's offer to be his vice-presidential running mate because "it wasn't the right thing for me or my family." The divorce was finalized in January 2019, with Joni Ernst alleging that Gail had verbally and mentally abused her and on one occasion physically assaulted her. The Ernsts accused each other of infidelity; both denied the respective accusations.

In her first interview after her divorce, Ernst revealed that she had been raped in college.

Ernst is a lifetime member of the Montgomery County Republican Women, Veterans of Foreign Wars Post 2265, Montgomery County Court of Honor, Altrusa, PEO and Chapter HB, the National Rifle Association of America. Her church is Mamrelund Lutheran Church in Stanton, Iowa, of the Evangelical Lutheran Church in America (ELCA) denomination.

On June 13, 2018, federal judge Linda Reade sentenced Joseph Dierks, of Waterloo, Iowa, to six years in prison for threatening "to kill or otherwise harm" Ernst on Twitter. The sentence, which exceeds sentencing guidelines, was imposed on Dierks for disparaging comments he made about Reade and threats against the case prosecutor and his children, and against black corrections officers while awaiting trial.

In May 2020, she published her memoir, Daughter of the Heartland: My Ode to the Country That Raised Me.

In March 2025, ProPublica reported that, according to multiple sources, Ernst had romantic relationships with a "legislative affairs official" for the Navy in 2019 and "the general who oversaw" the Air Force's "lobbying before Congress" at some point before the Inspector General for the Air Force completed a report on that general's behavior in 2023; these relationships raised conflict of interest questions about Ernst, who was serving on the Armed Services Committee at the time. Ernst's spokesperson called reports about her alleged romantic relationships with military officials "gossip by the fake news media", adding that any indication otherwise was a "slanderous lie—full stop".

== Electoral history ==
2004 Montgomery County Auditor General Election
Party	Candidate	Votes	%
Republican	Joni Ernst	3,661	68.55%
Independent	Connie Magneson (incumbent)	1,680	31.45%
Total votes		5,341	100%

2011 Special Election for Senate District 48
Party	Candidate	Votes	%
Republican	Joni Ernst	4,990	67.45%
Democratic	Ruby Smith	2,407	32.53%
Total votes		7,398	100%

Iowa State Senate 12th district Republican primary, 2012
Party	Candidate	Votes	%
Republican	Joni Ernst	5,611	99.68%
Write-in		18	0.32%
Total votes		5,629	100%

Iowa State Senate 12th district general election, 2012
Party	Candidate	Votes	%
Republican	Joni Ernst	22,205	99.06%
Write-in		210	0.93%
Total votes		22,415	100%

U.S. Senate Republican primary election in Iowa, 2014
Party	Candidate	Votes	%
Republican	Joni Ernst	88,535	56.12%
Republican	Sam Clovis	28,418	18.01%
Republican	Mark Jacobs	26,523	16.81%
Republican	Matt Whitaker	11,884	7.53%
Republican	Scott Schaben	2,233	1.42%
Write-in		155	0.10%
Total votes		157,748	100%

U.S. Senate general election in Iowa, 2014
Party	Candidate	Votes	%
Republican	Joni Ernst	588,575	52.10%
Democratic	Bruce Braley	494,370	43.76%
independent (politician)	Rick Stewart	26,815	2.37%
Libertarian	Douglas Butzier	8,232	0.73%
Term Limits	Bob Quast	5,873	0.52%
independent (politician)	Ruth Smith	4,724	0.41%
Write-in		1,111	0.10%
Total votes		1,129,700	100%

U.S. Senate Republican primary election in Iowa, 2020
Party	Candidate	Votes	%
Republican	Joni Ernst (incumbent)	226,589	98.63%
Write-in		3,132	1.36%
Total votes		229,721	100%

U.S. Senate general election in Iowa, 2020
Party	Candidate	Votes	%
Republican	Joni Ernst (incumbent)	864,997	51.74%
Democratic	Theresa Greenfield	754,859	45.15%
Libertarian	Rick Stewart	36,961	2.21%
independent (politician)	Suzanne Herzog	13,800	0.83%
Write-in		1,211	0.07%
Total votes		1,671,828	100%

== See also ==
- Women in the United States Senate

Party political offices
Preceded by Christopher Reed (2008)	Republican nominee for U.S. Senator from Iowa (Class 2); 2014, 2020	Succeeded by Ashley Hinson
Preceded by Cathy McMorris Rodgers	Response to the State of the Union address 2015	Succeeded by Nikki Haley
Preceded by Chris Christie	Keynote Speaker of the Republican National Convention; 2016	no subsequent
Preceded by Roy Blunt	Vice Chair of the Senate Republican Conference; 2019–2023	Succeeded by Shelley Moore Capito
Preceded by Roy Blunt	Chair of the Senate Republican Policy Committee; 2023–2025	Succeeded by Shelley Moore Capito
U.S. Senate
Preceded by Tom Harkin	U.S. Senator (Class 2) from Iowa; 2015–present Served alongside: Chuck Grassley	Incumbent
Preceded by Rand Paul	Ranking Member of the Senate Small Business Committee; 2023–2025	Succeeded by Ed Markey
Preceded by Jeanne Shaheen	Chair of the Senate Small Business Committee; 2025–present	Incumbent
U.S. order of precedence (ceremonial)
Preceded by Gary Peters	Order of precedence of the United States as United States Senator	Succeeded by Shelley Moore Capito
Preceded by Thom Tillis	United States senators by seniority 54th	Succeeded by Dan Sullivan
