= Salzer =

Salzer, otherwise Saltzer and Sälzer, is a German surname meaning "salter". Notable people with this surname include the following:

- Bernhard Sälzer (1940–1993), German MEP
- Bruno Sälzer (born 1957), German CEO of Escada, international luxury fashion group
- Else Rambausek-Salzer (1907–1994), Austrian actress and singer
- Felix Salzer (1904–1986), Austrian-American music theorist and musicologist
- František Salzer (1902–1974), Czech actor and director
- Friedrich Salzer (1827–1876), German landscape painter
- Jerry Saltzer (born 1939), American computer scientist
- Lisel Salzer (1906–2005), Austrian-born American painter
- Monika Salzer (born 1948) Austrian psychotherapist, Protestant theologian and pastor, columnist, and author
- Otto Salzer (1874–1944), German racing car driver
- Robert Samuel Salzer (1919–1988), Vice Admiral of the United States Navy
