= Vladimir Zeltser =

Soviet historian (1905-1937)

Vladimir Zel'manovich Zel'tser (Russian: Владимир Зельманович Зельцер; 8 April 1905, Voznesensk, Kherson Governorate - 10 August 1937, Magadan), was a Soviet historian, a specialist in the history of the AUCP(b), Candidate of Historical Sciences (1929), a member of the Komsomol in 1921-1928, a member of the AUCP(b) since 1927.

Born in the city of Voznesensk, Kherson Governorate, in the family of the plant manager. He studied at the Mykolaiv Commercial School (August 1914-June 1920) and the Mykolaiv Vocational School (1920-1921). In April 1922-May 1925 — a teacher of history and economics of the Mykolaiv Soviet Party School. In May 1925 and February 1926, a research associate and member of the Bureau of the Istpart Mykolaiv Branch; at the same time in June 1925-February 1926 — deputy head of the Political Education Department of the Nikolaev Regional Committee of the LCSYU. In February 1926-September 1929 — graduate student of the Institute of History of the Russian Association of Social Sciences Research Institutes; simultaneously from September 1926 — a teacher of history of the AUCP(b) and Leninism of the Ethnographic Faculty of the First Moscow State University, teacher of Russian history at the Working University at 2 Moscow State University, at the Political Enlightenment Institute and the Evening Pedagogical Institute at the Academy of Communist Education N. K. Krupskaya. From July 1929 to 1931, he was an assistant professor, head of the USSR history department at the Nizhny Novgorod Pedagogical Institute; at the same time, from February 1930, he was an associate professor at the Nizhny Novgorod Communist Higher Education Institution. From 1932 he lived in Moscow: a lecturer at Moscow State University, a senior fellow at the Institute of History of the Communist Academy, editor-consultant of the publishing house and the editorial board of the “History of Plants” of the Communist Academy. He was arrested on 5 March 1935. By a decree of the Special Council of the NKVD of the USSR, on 9 May 1935, he was sentenced to 3 years of a forced labor camp; from 16 June 1936 he was serving at the mine «Tayezhnyy» of the Sevvostlag. He was arrested on 2 May 1937. NKVD troika of the Dalstroy on 10 September 1937 sentenced him to capital punishment. He was rehabilitated by the Presidium of the Magadan Regional Court on 23 May 1957.

== Books ==
- Дореформенная экономика : Формирование промышленного капитализма и подготовка реформ (Pre-Reform Economy: The Formation of Industrial Capitalism and the Preparation of Reforms) / В. Зельцер, А. Гайсинович. - [Харьков] : Пролетарий, 1930. - 158 с.; 19 см. - (Библиотечка по истории народов СССР/ Под ред. М. Мебеля, В. Н. Нежского и С. Пионтковского).
- Христианский социализм на Западе : (Исторический очерк) (Christian Socialism in the West: (Historical Essay))/ В. Зельцер; Центр. совет Союза воинствующих безбожников СССР. - Москва : Безбожник, 1930 (Л. : гос. тип. им. Евг. Соколовой). - 78 с.;
