= Setzer =

Setzer is a German and Jewish occupational surname. In Middle High German setzen meant to set prices and referred to a market inspector or a tax official. In Yiddish setser referred to a typesetter (German: Schriftsetzer). Notable people with the surname include:

- Arlene Setzer, American politician
- Brian Setzer (born 1959), American guitarist and songwriter
- Dennis Setzer, American race car driver
- Franz Xaver Setzer, actually Franz Anton Adolf (1886–1939), Austrian photographer
- Henry Setzer, American politician
- Matthew Setzer, American musician, composer, and music technologist
- Mitchell S. Setzer, American politician

== See also ==
- Setzer Gabbiani, character in the video game Final Fantasy VI
