= Gabrielle Selz =

American author, art critic, and appraiser (born 1958)

- Born: July 26, 1958 (age 68); Claremont, California, U.S.
- Education: Bachelor's degree in Art History (University of California, Santa Cruz); Master's degree in Writing (City College of New York)
- Occupations: Author, Art Critic, Art Appraiser
- Notable work: Unstill Life: A Daughter’s Memoir of Art and Life in the Age of Abstraction; Light on Fire: The Art and Life of Sam Francis
- Parents: Peter Selz (father); Thalia Selz (mother)
- Awards: Moth Story Slam winner; NYFA Fellowship in Nonfiction, 2009; Best Memoir of the Year, American Society of Journalists and Authors; Silver Medal in Nonfiction, California Book Awards, 2022
- Website: www.selzfineartappraisals.com

Gabrielle Selz (born July 26, 1958) is an American author, art critic, and appraiser specializing in art. Selz is noted for her contributions to the understanding and appreciation of modern and contemporary art, as well as for her published works on art history and personal memoirs.

== Early life and education ==
Selz was born in Claremont, California, and grew up immersed in the vibrant cultural and artistic milieu of Westbeth Artists Community, where she was exposed to numerous artists and intellectuals. Her father, Peter Selz, significantly influenced the art world as the Chief Curator of Painting and Sculpture at the Museum of Modern Art in New York during the 1960s and later as the Founding Director of the Berkeley Art Museum and Pacific Film Archive.

She pursued her academic interests in art history, obtaining her bachelor's degree from the University of California, Santa Cruz, in 1980. Furthering her education, Selz earned a master's degree in writing from the City College of New York in 2014. Throughout her career, Selz has contributed essays and reviews to publications such as The New Yorker, The New York Times, the Los Angeles Times, and Artforum. She has also been recognized as a Moth Story Slam winner and received the New York Foundation for the Arts Fellowship in Nonfiction in 2009.

== Career ==
=== Publications ===
Gabrielle Selz has made contributions to the literary world through her exploration of art history and personal memoirs.

==== Unstill Life: A Daughter’s Memoir of Art and Life in the Age of Abstraction ====
Selz's literary debut, Unstill Life (W.W. Norton, 2014), delves into her unique upbringing among some of the 20th century's most prominent artists and intellectuals. This memoir explores the complexities of her family life, set against the backdrop of the Age of Abstraction. The narrative interweaves personal anecdotes with significant art historical events, offering readers a rare glimpse into the intimate dynamics of a family deeply embedded in the art world. The book was critically acclaimed, earning the title of Best Memoir of the Year from the American Society of Journalists and Authors and recognized as one of the best books of 2014 by the San Francisco Chronicle.

==== Light on Fire: The Art and Life of Sam Francis ====
In 2021, Selz published Light on Fire: The Art and Life of Sam Francis (University of California Press), the first comprehensive biography of the abstract expressionist Sam Francis. Drawing from a wealth of primary sources, including personal interviews and Francis's own writings, Selz presents a meticulously researched account of Francis's life and work. The book illuminates Francis's pivotal role in the development of post-war American art and his profound impact on the global art scene. It was awarded the silver medal in Nonfiction at the California Book Awards in 2022, highlighting its significant contribution to art historical scholarship.

=== Selz Fine Art ===
In addition to her writing, Selz founded Selz Fine Art in 2019. Selz is accredited by the American Society of Appraisers.

== Personal life ==
Selz has been married and divorced twice, first to painter David Geiser, followed by a second marriage to Bogdan Mync, with whom she shares a son.
