= Peter Selz =

German-born American art historian (1919–2019)

- Born: Peter Howard Selz; March 27, 1919; Munich, People's State of Bavaria, Germany
- Died: June 21, 2019 (aged 100); Albany, California, U.S.
- Education: University of Chicago, École du Louvre
- Occupations: Art historian, Museum director, Curator
- Known for: Specialization in German Expressionism, innovative art exhibitions

Peter Howard Selz (March 27, 1919 – June 21, 2019) was a German-born American art historian and museum director and curator who specialized in German Expressionism.

== Biography ==
Peter Selz was born in Munich of Jewish parents. In 1936, aged 17, he fled Nazi Germany because his parents wanted to send him to study in the United States. His family managed to escape Germany just before the Night of Broken Glass, with the help of some nuns, whom his optometrist father had treated for free. He spent one year at Columbia University and discovered that he was distantly related to Alfred Stieglitz, who became his mentor. After serving in World War II he received an A.M. from the University of Chicago on the GI Bill in 1949. He received several Fulbright scholarships in the following years to study at the University of Paris and École du Louvre as well as the Musées Royaux d'Art et d'Histoire; at the same time, Selz was teaching at the University of Chicago and also chaired the education department at the Institute of Design at the Illinois Institute of Technology in Chicago. In 1955 he moved to Pomona College to chair the art department and serve as director of the school's art gallery.

In 1958, Selz became the curator of department of painting and sculpture exhibitions at the Museum of Modern Art in New York. His first exhibition at the Modern was the influential "New Images of Man" in 1959, which included paintings by Karel Appel, Francis Bacon, Richard Diebenkorn, Jean Dubuffet, Leon Golub, Balcomb Greene, Willem de Kooning, Rico Lebrun, James McGarrell, Jan Müller, Nathan Oliveira, and Jackson Pollock and sculpture by Dubuffet, Kenneth Armitage, Leonard Baskin, Reg Butler, Cosmo Campoli, César, Eduardo Paolozzi, Germaine Richier, Theodore Roszak, H.C. Westermann, and Fritz Wotruba. In 1961, he invited Mark Rothko to show panels commissioned by Phillip Johnson for the Four Seasons Restaurant in the Seagram Building. Rothko withdrew from the commission and the panels became the basis for the MoMA exhibit. Subsequent major exhibitions curated by Selz included Jean Tinguely's kinetic, self-destroying sculpture "Homage to New York"; the first Rodin retrospective in the United States; and a comprehensive 1965 exhibition of work by Alberto Giacometti.

Selz served as Professor of Art History at the University of California, Berkeley from 1965 to 1988; at the same time, he served as the founding director of the Berkeley Art Museum from 1965 to 1973. Selz brought an unorthodox and irreverent approach to his selection of artists. His daughter Gabrielle Selz said in a 2014 interview that while he "came out to Berkeley just as Pop and Conceptual Art were ascending on the East Coast," Selz turned away from these popular movements and instead "identified with the irreverence of styles like Funk art," seeking to highlight the work of "ceramic artists like Peter Voulkos [who] were barely considered fine artists then" or Nathan Oliveira, "a figurative artist who did not follow the prevailing east coast trends."

In 1976, Selz served as project director for Christo’s Running Fence, a 24.5-mile long fabric fence installed in the Marin County hills.

Selz's life and his contribution to art history has been chronicled in two books: Unstill Life: A Memoir of Art and Love in the Age of Abstraction by Gabrielle Selz, and Peter Selz: Sketches of a Life in Art by Paul Karlstrom and Ann Karlstrom.

Selz died in Albany, California, on June 21, 2019, at the age of 100.

== Selected bibliography ==
- German Expressionist Painting. Berkeley, CA: University of California Press, 1957
- Emil Nolde. New York: Museum of Modern Art/Doubleday, 1963
- Alberto Giacometti. New York: Museum of Modern Art, New York/Art Institute of Chicago/Doubleday, 1965
- Directions in Kinetic Sculpture. Berkeley: University Art Museum [and] the Committee for Arts and Lectures, University of California, 1966 (with George Rickey)
- Theories of Modern Art: a Source Book by Artists and Critics. Berkeley: University of California Press, 1968 (with Hershel B. Chipp and Joshua Taylor)
- Ferdinand Hodler. Berkeley: University Art Museum, 1972 (with Jura Brüschweiler, Phyllis Hattis, and Eva Wyler)
- Art in a Turbulent Era. Ann Arbor, MI: UMI Press, 1985
- Art in Our Times: A Pictorial History. New York: Abrams, 1981
- Beyond the Mainstream: Essays on Modern and Contemporary Art. New York: Cambridge University Press, 1997.
