= Seltzer (surname) =

Seltzer is a surname. Notable people with the surname include:

- Aaron Seltzer (born 1974), with Jason Friedberg, screenwriter and director of parody films
- David Seltzer (born 1940), American screenwriter, producer, and director
- H. Jack Seltzer (1922–2011), American politician
- Jerry Seltzer (born 1932), second and final owner of the original Roller Derby league
- Leo Seltzer (1903–1978), who co-created the sport of roller derby
- Margaret Seltzer (born 1975), American writer
- Nachman Seltzer (born 1978), Orthodox Jewish writer
- Olaf C. Seltzer (1877–1957), Danish-born American painter
- Stan Seltzer, piano player in the Stan Seltzer Trio
- Thomas Seltzer, translator and editor of Russian stories
- Happy-Tom, born Thomas Seltzer, bassist and main songwriter in the band Turbonegro
- Walter Seltzer (born 1914), film producer
- Wendy Seltzer, American lawyer
